= Hof Aza Regional Council =

Former Israeli Regional Council

Coordinates: 31°21′17.91″N 34°16′28.39″E

- Regional council
- 1979–2005
- Flag Coat of arms

- Location in Israel
- Capital: Neve Dekalim
- Population
  - 2005: 8,900
- History
  - Established: May 1979
  - Disestablishment: August 2005
- Today part of: The Gaza Strip

The Hof Aza Regional Council (Hebrew: מועצה אזורית חוף עזה, "Gaza Coast Regional Council") was a regional council of Israel until 2005 when its residents were evicted from their homes and the area was liquidated as part of Israel's unilateral disengagement plan. The seat was in Neve Dekalim. The public buildings of the regional council and adjacent strip mall in Neve Dekalim were not destroyed and the Palestinian Al-Aqsa University opened a campus on the site shortly after the Israeli evacuation.

== Settlements ==
The Hof Aza Regional Council included twenty-one civilian Israeli settlements:

- Bedolah
- Bnei Atzmon (Atzmona)
- Dugit
- Elei Sinai
- Gadid
- Gan Or
- Ganei Tal
- Katif
- Kerem Atzmona
- Kfar Darom
- Kfar Yam
- Morag
- Neveh Dekalim
- Netzarim
- Netzer Hazani
- Nisanit
- Pe'at Sade
- Rafiah Yam
- Shirat Hayam
- Slav
- Tel Katifa
