= List of Palestinian rocket attacks on Israel in 2001 =

The following is a list of Palestinian rocket and mortar attacks on Israel in 2001. Almost all of the incidents were mortar attacks, as the Qassam rocket was first launched on July 10 of the year, and first used against civilian targets in October and November, when four rockets were fired on Sderot in Israel and various Gush Katif settlements in the Gaza Strip.

In 2001, Israel maintained a military and civilian presence in the Gaza Strip. This list includes attacks on Israel proper and on Israeli civilian communities in the Gaza Strip, but not on Israeli military targets in the territory. Israel withdrew completely from the territory in 2005.

== January ==
January 30
Palestinians fired a mortar shell at a house in Netzarim in the Gaza Strip. This was the first time Palestinians had used a ballistic weapon against a Jewish settlement. The shell penetrated the house's roof but was stopped by a concrete ceiling. The family members living in the house were on the ground floor at the time, and there were no injuries.

== February ==
February 10
During the night, Palestinians fired a mortar shell at a house in the town of Netzarim. There were no injuries. Israeli settlers began to set up new bomb shelters and stockpile food amid fears that the attacks were heralding an all-out war.

February 15
Palestinians fired two mortar shells at Netzarim. No injuries were reported.

February 22
In the evening, Palestinians fired four mortar shells at the towns of Dugit and Elei Sinai in the Gaza Strip. Israel responded the following day by destroying two Palestinian police stations.

== March ==
March 4
Palestinians fired what appeared to be mortar shells at Netzarim. No injuries were reported.

March 8
In the evening, Palestinians fired two mortar shells at Netzarim. There were no injuries, but residents were instructed to enter bomb shelters.

March 17
Shortly after midnight, Palestinians in Khan Yunis fired an anti-tank missile at the Neve Dekalim industrial zone in the Gaza Strip.

March 18
In the evening, Palestinians fired three mortar shells from the Gaza Strip at the Israeli farming community of Nahal Oz, wounding a soldier. This was the first Palestinian ballistic attack on Israel proper in the Second Intifada.

March 21
In the evening, Palestinian Authority Force 17 fighters fired two mortar shells at the town of Morag in the Gaza Strip and three mortar shells at Netzarim. Israel responded by firing mortars at a nearby Palestinian police post, killing an officer.

March 26
In the evening, Palestinians fired three mortar shells at Morag. No injuries were reported.

== April ==
April 3
Palestinians fired three mortar shells into the village of Atzmona in the Gaza Strip. The shrapnel from one of the mortars sprayed a 10-month-old baby and his mother, critically wounding the baby and lightly wounding the mother. A group calling itself "Hezbollah-Palestine" claimed responsibility. Israel responded with airstrikes on several Palestinian Authority police buildings.

April 6
Palestinians fired mortars on three unspecified Israeli settlements and one communal farm in Israel. There were no injuries. Israel responded with airstrikes on two Palestinian police stations.

April 7
On the eve of Passover, Palestinians fired a mortar shell at Elei Sinai. There were no injuries.

April 8
Late in the first day of Passover, Palestinians fired five mortar shells at Nahal Oz and an adjacent IDF post. Israel responded by shelling Palestinian security headquarters at Beit Lahiya in the northern Gaza Strip.

April 9
In the afternoon of the second day of Passover, Palestinians fired a mortar shell at Atzmona. A school in the community was damaged, but there were no injuries.

April 10
On the third day of Passover, Palestinians fired two mortar shells at the town of Katif in the Gaza Strip, causing no injuries. Israel responded by rocketing the Palestinian Naval Police headquarters in Gaza City and a military intelligence building in Deir el-Balah, killing a police doctor. Later in the day, Palestinians fired additional mortars at Nisanit. Israel responded by firing on a Palestinian police station in the northern Gaza Strip.

April 11
In the evening of the fourth day of Passover, Palestinians fired mortars shells at the towns of Nisanit and Kfar Darom in the Gaza Strip and at Kibbutz Netiv HaAsara in Israel.

April 15
After dark, Palestinians fired four mortar shells at the towns of Netzer Hazani and Katif in the Gaza Strip, causing no injuries.

April 16
Palestinians fired four mortar shells on the city of Sderot in Israel, causing no injuries or damage. Hamas claimed responsibility for the attack. Israel responded by seizing Palestinian-controlled areas in the Gaza Strip and rocketing Palestinian military installations, killing a Palestinian policeman.

April 17
Palestinians fired six mortar shells at Neve Dekalim.

April 18
In the morning, Palestinians fired mortars at Nisanit. Hamas claimed responsibility, saying the attack was "dedicated" to the families of Syrian soldiers killed in a radar position in Lebanon. After nightfall, Palestinians fired five additional mortars at the village of Nir Am in Israel and at Kfar Darom.

April 19
In the afternoon, Palestinians fired two mortar shells which landed between Atzmona and Morag. There were no injuries. Israel did not respond to the attack.

April 24
After a respite of several days from mortar attacks, in the early evening Palestinians in Khan Yunis fired three mortar shells at the town of Gadid in the Gaza Strip. There were no injuries but a hothouse was damaged.

April 28
Palestinians fired five mortars at the village of Netzer Hazani in the Gaza Strip, hitting a recreation center and wounding six civilian youths, one seriously. A previously unknown group called The Four Martyrs, which claimed affiliation with Fatah, took responsibility for the attack, saying it was a retaliation for a recent blast in the Gaza Strip in which four Fatah activists were killed. Fatah itself disavowed the attack and denied knowledge of the group. Israel did not respond to the attack.

April 30
Palestinians in Khan Yunis fired two mortars at Gadid.

== May ==
May 4
Palestinians fired two mortar shells on Kfar Aza.

May 6
Late in the day, Palestinians fired a mortar shell at Netzarim.

May 7
Palestinians fired four mortar shells on Kfar Aza. No injuries or damage were reported. Israel responded by destroying a Palestinian police post.

May 9
In the morning, Palestinians fired two mortar shells on Nisanit.

May 11
Palestinians fired six mortar shells at unspecified Israeli settlements and towns.

May 15
In the morning, Hamas militants were firing mortars at Kfar Aza when they were killed by IDF tank fire. After nightfall, Palestinians a mortar shell from Deir el-Ballah that hit the roof of a house in Kfar Darom, causing damage but no injuries. Two others mortars landed inside Israel near Kibbutz Nir Am.

May 17
Palestinians fired three mortar shells at two Jewish communities. One landed inside Israel, near Nir Am, and another landed at the entrance to Netzarim. In the evening, a third shell exploded in the backyard of a family home in Netzer Hazani, damaging the house. The family was not in the home at the time because they were visiting their son, who was wounded in the April 28 youth club shelling. Islamic Jihad claimed responsibility for the attacks on Nir Am and Netzer Hazani.

May 18
After daybreak, Palestinians fired a mortar shell at Gadid, which exploded among the community's greenhouses.

May 19
Palestinians fired seven mortar shells at Gadid.

May 22
Palestinians fired three mortar shells into Israel, all of which exploded in open areas. No injuries or damage were reported.

May 24
In the morning, Palestinians fired two mortar shells on Netzarim. There were no injuries.

May 26
After nightfall, Palestinians in Khan Yunis fired a mortar shell into Neve Dekalim.

May 30
In the morning, Palestinians fired two mortar shells at Rafiah Yam.

== June ==
June 1
Early in the day, Palestinians fired four mortar shells that exploded near greenhouses in the Israeli settlement of Slav in the Gaza Strip.

June 3
After nightfall, Palestinians fired two mortar shells toward Kfar Darom. There were no injuries.

June 7
After nightfall, Palestinians fired four mortar shells at Ganei Tal. There were no injuries.

June 8
Palestinians fired two mortar shells on Atzmona and Rafiah Yam. There were no injuries or damage. Israel responded by firing two anti-tank shells on a Palestinian Force 17 position.

June 10
Palestinians fired eight mortar shells at two unspecified Gaza Strip settlements.

June 12
Palestinians fired three mortar shells at Morag. There were no injuries.

June 13
In the evening, several hours after a ceasefire went into effect, Palestinians fired a mortar shell at Atzmona.

June 14
With the ceasefire still in effect, Palestinians fired five mortar shells at Morag after nightfall. Fatah claimed responsibility.

June 18
After nightfall, Palestinians fired four mortar shells at the Neve Dekalim industrial area.

June 19
Palestinians fired five mortar shells at Moshav Katif. There were no injuries.

June 21
Palestinians fired a 120mm mortar shell at an unspecified village in Israel, breaking car windows. It was the first time that this large shell type had been used.

June 29
Palestinians fired a mortar shell at Netzarim.

== July ==
July 4
Palestinians fired a mortar shell on an unspecified settlement.

July 6
Palestinians fired a mortar shell toward Gadid.

July 10
Palestinians fired a mortar shell on an unspecified farming community in Israel. There were no injuries.

July 17
Early in the morning, Palestinians fired two mortar shells at Morag and Netzer Hazani.
Palestinians in Beit Jalla in the West Bank fired two mortar shells at the Gilo neighborhood of East Jerusalem. This was the first attack of its type in the area, though numerous shooting attacks from Beit Jalla had taken place previously.

July 18
Palestinians fired two mortar shells at Kibbutz Nahal Oz in Israel.

July 27
In the evening, Palestinians fired mortar shells at Gadid. Israel responded by destroying a Palestinian munitions factory.

July 30
Palestinians fired a mortar shell at Kfar Darom, wounding a 9-year-old girl.

July 31
Palestinians fired rwo mortar shells at Netzarim and at least one mortar at Rafiah Yam. In the evening, Palestinians fired two mortar shells at Atzmona. There were no injuries.
