= Kfar Yam =

Former Israeli settlement in the Gaza Strip

Kfar Yam: כְּפַר יָם (Hebrew)
- Former Israeli settlement
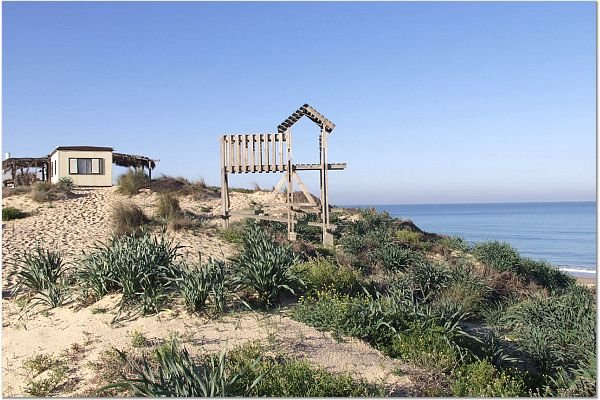

- Location within the Gaza Strip
- Coordinates: 31°21′09″N 34°15′31″E
- Country: Palestine
- Founded: 1983; 43 years ago

Kfar Yam (Hebrew: כְּפַר יָם, lit. 'Sea Village'), sometimes spelled Kefar Yam or Kfar Hayam in English, was a small non-religious community established in 1983 and populated by four families. It was part of the Gush Katif bloc of Gaza Strip Israeli Settlements that were evacuated and abandoned in the 2005 Israeli disengagement from the Gaza Strip.

== Location ==
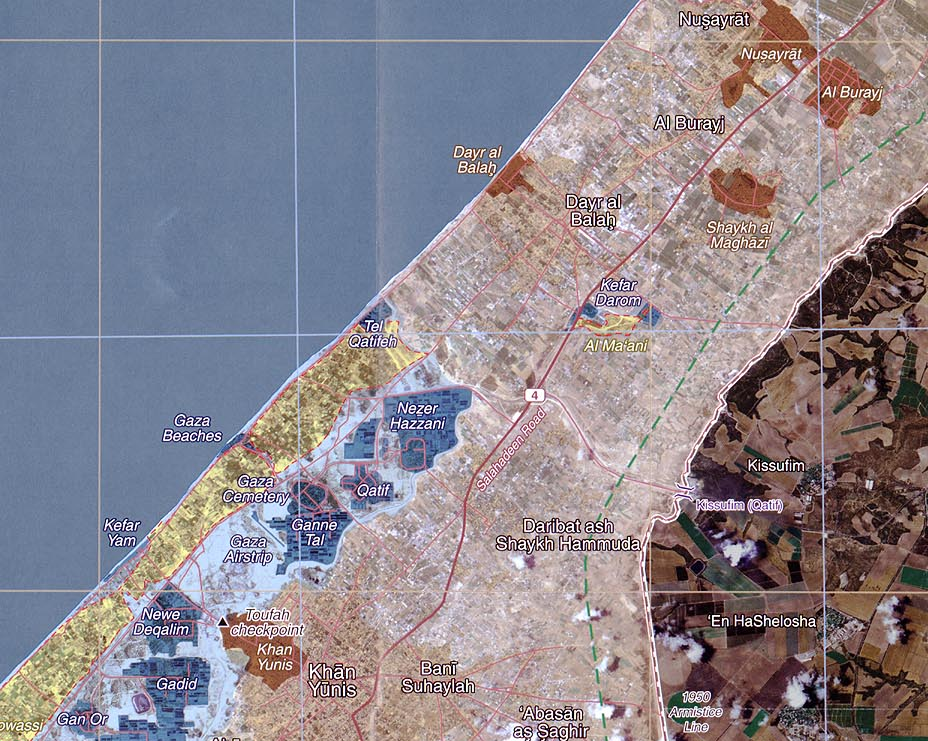
Map of the Gaza Strip in May 2005, showing Kfar Yam (labelled "Kefar Yam") in the lower left

Kfar Yam was located among the Gush Katif settlements on the coast of the Gaza Strip, roughly 4 kilometres (2.5 mi) northwest of Khan Yunis. It was near the settlements of Shirat HaYam to the northeast and Gan Or to the south. Neve Dekalim, to the southeast, was the nearest town-sized Israeli settlement, and the Tofah checkpoint separated the Gush Katif settlement area from Khan Yunis.

The buildings of the settlement were located on the sand dunes directly overlooking the seashore. In 2005, there was also a short-lived Israeli outpost located nearby. It was called "Sea Song" and had an area of about 5 dunams.

== History ==
Kfar Yam was established on public land which had been a holiday village for officers of the occupying Egyptian Army in the 1960s. In 1964, 15 cabins were built on the land by the Khan Yunis municipality, and the leaseholder rights were given to two Palestinians from Khan Yunis.

In 1971, the Israeli government took over authority of the land from the Khan Yunis municipality and began demanding rent from the Palestinians who had been living there. According to the Palestinian Centre for Human Rights (PCHR), one Israeli settler took over five of the cabins and established Kfar Yam as an informal settlement with an area of about 40 dunams. Then in 1983, after Israel withdrew from the Sinai Peninsula as a result of the Egypt–Israel peace treaty, the Israeli authorities refused to renew the lease and evicted the Palestinian residents, saying that the area had been leased out to the Israeli Regional Settlements Council. The residents challenged their eviction in court, but were unsuccessful. Originally, the Gaza coast Regional Council, which was overseeing Israeli settlement in the area, wanted to use the cabins for tourism purposes, but Israeli military officials objected, citing security concerns. Ultimately, the settlement was approved after Israeli General Moshe Bar-Kochva intervened, directing the military officials to come up with plans to develop the settlement.

After the initial establishment, a handful of other additional settlers came to Kfar Yam. When describing early living conditions there, former residents have said that they did not have electricity and had inconsistent access to running water. New arrivals would sometimes decide to renovate the old buildings, or would build new ones to live in.

In the 1990s, there were a number of disputes and clashes between the Israeli residents of Kfar Yam and the Palestinian residents of the surrounding Al-Mawasi area.

In the months before the disengagement and removal of the Israeli settlers, there were some attempts at organized, militiant resistance to the disengagement, some of which was led by right-wing activist and military historian Aryeh Yitzhaki, who lived in Kfar Yam at the time. On 18 August 2005, the day of the removal, Yitzhaki led a group of about 40 protesters (including his family, a handful of other residents, and a group of boys) in a standoff with police. According to Ynet, there were "at least four" of them were armed and standing on the roof, having barricaded themselves in. Yitzhaki was among them and made verbal threats toward the police, saying that they were armed and would shoot if the police stormed the compound. After hours of negotiation with police, the group agreed to surrender and was evacuated.

== Population ==
According to the Palestinian Centre for Human Rights (PCHR), the official population of the settlement was 10 as of 1997, but the PCHR disputed this number, claiming that the site was really only occupied by one settler named Amos. As of 2005, there were two families who lived in Kfar Yam; these families were evacuated on 18 August 2005.

== Legacy and impact ==
After the evacuation, some of the buildings were demolished, and others only partially demolished. A December 2005 environmental assessment found asbestos in some of the debris and in the roofing of a partially demolished building, but did not note any other environmental pollutants.

There is a street named for Kfar Yam in the Israeli city of Netivot.

== See also ==
- Al-Mawasi, Rafah
- Hof Aza Regional Council
- Israeli outpost
- List of ghost towns by country
- List of Israeli settlements
- List of villages depopulated during the Arab–Israeli conflict
