= Katif =

Katif, Qatif or Qateef (Hebrew: קָטִיף; Arabic: قطيف) may refer to the following:

- Qatif, a region in Saudi Arabia
- Katif (moshav), a former Israeli moshav in the Gaza Strip
- Gush Katif, the largest former Israeli settlement bloc in the Gaza Strip
