= Sheikh Khalifa City =

Coordinates: 31°18′24.51″N 34°17′08.74″E

Sheikh Khalifa City (Arabic: مدينة الشيخ خليفة) in the southwestern Gaza Strip, is the site named after United Arab Emirates President Khalifa bin Zayed Al Nahyan who finances the construction of a major housing programme of 3,000 apartments.

This area of land was once an Israeli settlement known as Morag, in the Gush Katif settlement bloc. The settlement was leveled in 2005 following the residents' eviction as part of Israel's unilateral disengagement plan.
