= Tel Katifa =

Former Israeli settlement in the Gaza Strip

Tel Katifa: תל קטיפא (Hebrew)
- Former Israeli settlement
- Location within the Gaza Strip
- Coordinates: 31°24′15″N 34°18′57″E
- Country: Israel
- Founded: 1992

Tel Katifa (Hebrew: תל קטיפא) was a small Israeli settlement located in the northeast end of the Gush Katif settlement bloc of the Gaza Strip, and evacuated in Israel's disengagement of 2005.

== History ==
Tel Katifa was named after the adjacent archaeological site from the Canaanite period.

Tel Katifa was founded in May 1992 on the Mediterranean coast by second generation Gush Katif single farmers. The residents understood that they would need to attract families in order for the settlement to develop properly and in 1998, several from Ganei Tal, Katif, and Neve Dekalim answered the call. Until that, living conditions had been rudimentary. The singles had been living in trailers, electricity was provided by a generator that did not work all day because of the high cost of operation. Water pressure was low and when the greenhouses were being irrigated, there was no water for personal use. Permanent homes were built, along with a nursery and a mikveh.

== Geography ==
The Palestinian village of Deir el-Balah lied on the northern edge of the settlement. A natural pond was located in the heart of the settlement, water from which was used to irrigate a small greenhouse farm.

A small army outpost with a few dozen Israeli soldiers guarded the location by manning the main gate, a watchtower that stood above the settlement, and a tank that stood watch during the night.

== Culture ==
The 20 or so families lived in either houses or trailers and were composed of a mix of secular and orthodox Jews who lived together in tight community with activities for all ages. The expression 'living together in harmony' was used often.

== Unilateral disengagement ==
Residents of Tel Katifa were evicted on August 17, 2005, by the Israeli Army and Israeli Police who reported that 156 people were removed from the site. The houses were destroyed and the area was abandoned.
