= Kerem Atzmona =

Former Israeli settlement in the Gaza Strip

Kerem Atzmona: כרם עצמונה (Hebrew)
- Former Israeli settlement
- Location within the Gaza Strip
- Coordinates: 31°18′52″N 34°16′03″E
- Country: Israel
- Founded: 2001

Kerem Atzmona (Hebrew: כרם עצמונה) was an unauthorized Israeli outpost in the Gush Katif settlement bloc, located in the south-west edge of the Gaza Strip, and evacuated as part of Israel's unilateral disengagement plan of 2005.

== History ==
Karem Atzmona founded on Tu Bishvat in 2001, was located adjacent to the settlement of Bnei Atzmon. The settlement was never legally recognized by the Israeli government, and was legally classified as a neighborhood of Bnei Atzmon.

The history of Kerem Atzmona starts prior to the outbreak of the Second Intifada. Between the settlements of Morag and Bnei Atzmon, within Gush Katif, lied several thousand dunams of unused land that until a decade earlier had been a vineyard (kerem in Hebrew translates to vineyard) of Bnei Atzmon. In the summer of 2000, second generation children of Bnei Atzmon decided to hold a summer camp on the plateau which is sixty meters above sea level. A few months later in the fall, before the Jewish holiday of Rosh Hashana (and before the October 2000 riots), two families decided to move to the site and live in a trailer. The following spring, more families decided to move to the location and took up residence in additional trailers that were installed on the site.

At the beginning of this venture, financial and logistical support came from the community of Bnei Atzmon, but eventually the residents themselves became independent and took administrative control of that neighborhood-turned-settlement. Along with the living quarters, a synagogue, a mikveh for men, and a children's playground were built. Plans for adding a nursery were already finalized, and a master plan for an expansion along with permanent housing was in development at the time of evacuation.

The 20 families of Kerem Atzmon were evicted on 17 August 2005 by the Israeli Army and Police. The trailers and other structures were destroyed on 19 August.
