= Murder of the Hatuel family =

2004 shooting in the Gaza Strip

Killing of Tali Hatuel and her four daughters
- Part of the Second Intifada
- The attack site
- Location: 31°22′41″N 34°21′27″E; Kissufim Crossing
- Date: May 2, 2004; 22 years ago 12:40 pm (UTC+3)
- Attack type: Shooting attack
- Weapon: Automatic rifles
- Deaths: An 8 months pregnant mother and her 4 children (5) (+ 2 attackers)
- Perpetrators: Islamic Jihad and Popular Resistance Committees claimed responsibility
- Assailants: Ibrahim Hammad, Faisal Abu Maj'ra
- No. of participants: 2

The murder of the Hatuel family was a shooting attack on May 2, 2004, in which Palestinian militants killed Tali Hatuel, a Jewish settler, who was eight months pregnant, and her four daughters, aged two to eleven. The attack took place near the Kissufim Crossing near their home in Gush Katif bloc of Israeli settlements in the Gaza Strip during the Second Intifada. After shooting at the vehicle in which Hatuel was driving with her daughters, witnesses said the militants approached the vehicle and shot the occupants repeatedly at close range.

An alliance of Islamic Jihad and the Popular Resistance Committees claimed responsibility for the attack, stating that it was carried out in reprisal for the assassinations of Hamas leaders Sheikh Ahmad Yassin and Abdelaziz Rantisi by the Israeli army some weeks earlier.

The attack shocked the Israeli public, and was classified by Amnesty International as a crime against humanity. On June 6, 2007, the IDF arrested Jihad Salah Saliman Abu Dahar, a Palestinian member of Islamic Jihad from the Khan Yunis area, who according to Shin Bet officials admitted to several acts of violence, including the attack on Hatuel and her daughters.

== Background ==
In 1992 David and Tali Hatuel, a Jewish Israeli couple, moved from Ofakim, in southern Israel, to the Israeli settlement Katif located in the Gush Katif bloc in the Gaza Strip. David Hatuel was familiar with Gush Katif having studied in a yeshiva there. After three years the couple left for 18 months but returned once they had completed their studies. Tali worked as a social worker with the Gaza Coast Regional Council. Her work included counseling Israelis whose relatives had been killed in the conflict. David worked as a school principal in Ashkelon. They had four daughters and Tali was eight months pregnant with a son when she was killed.

== The attack ==
On Sunday, May 2, 2004, Hatuel picked up her three oldest daughters from school and drove with them and their 2-year-old sister in the family station wagon towards her husband's workplace in Ashkelon to campaign against Israel's unilateral disengagement plan. Likud party members were voting that day in a legally non-binding, advisory referendum being conducted across Israel and in Jewish settlements in the Palestinian territories on Ariel Sharon's disengagement proposal. While traveling in the vicinity of the Kissufim Crossing at 12:40 pm, two armed Palestinian militants, who had prepared an ambush near the highway, opened fire at the car, causing the car to spin off the road. The attackers, who were armed with automatic rifles, then approached the vehicle and fired their weapons from close range at Hatuel and her daughters repeatedly. The gunmen also opened fire on an Israeli civilian from Ohad in southern Israel traveling in a separate car. He managed to reverse and drive away injured. A CNN film crew working near Gush Katif who had come under fire by the militants earlier had attempted to warn and stop Israeli civilian vehicles leaving Gush Katif, among them Hatuel and her four daughters who drove past the armored CNN car.

Twenty minutes before the attack, the Israel Defense Forces (IDF) had received information about a possible attack and were strengthening forces in the area. The IDF killed both of the gunmen, identified as Ibrahim Mohammad Hammad (22), and Faisal Abu Naqira (26), reportedly from the Rafah refugee camp. A sniper stationed close by killed one of the men and soldiers sent to the scene charged the other attacker and shot him. Two soldiers from the Givati Brigade who were in a vehicle behind the Hatuel car were also injured during the battle. An explosive device was set off near the attack site but it did not result in any injuries. The Popular Resistance Committees and Islamic Jihad claimed responsibility for the attack, stating that it was carried out in reprisals for the assassinations of Hamas leaders Sheikh Ahmad Yassin and Abdelaziz Rantisi by the Israeli army earlier the same year and reportedly described it as "heroic".

== Aftermath ==
Tali Hatuel and her children were the first settlers in Gaza to be killed since 2002 and the attack "provoked extreme tension in Gaza". The deaths brought the total number of people killed in the Second Intifada to 3,958 at that time, 905 Israelis and 2,983 Palestinians.

Following the attack, Israeli helicopters fired three missiles at a tower-block in the Rimal neighbourhood of Gaza City that housed a radio station with links to Hamas which the IDF alleged had been broadcasting "incitement". The attack on the building, which also contained apartments, businesses, and the two main Palestinian newspapers, al-Ayyam and al-Quds, collapsed part of the roof, cut off the building's electricity and wounded seven people. Hours later, an Israeli air strike on a car in the West Bank city of Nablus killed four people described as members of the al-Aqsa Martyrs' Brigades by Palestinian sources. The IDF described them as "senior terrorists" who had been responsible for several attacks against Israeli civilians and soldiers.

On May 9, 2004, a week after the attack, two gunmen reportedly dressed in women's clothing, opened fire on about 200 to 300 people attending a heavily guarded memorial service on the Kissufim road in the southern Gaza Strip for Tali Hatuel and her daughters. Mourners had to take cover behind vehicles during the 20 to 30 minute exchange of fire. The gunmen opened fire on the attendees from about 300 meters away. David Hatuel was not present having been stopped on the way by soldiers once the shooting started. No Israelis were injured in the attack. The body of one gunman killed by the Israel Defense Forces was recovered after a search of the area but the IDF said that they believed a second gunman was also killed. Islamic Jihad claimed responsibility for the attack. After the attack, the chairman of the Gaza Coast Regional Council said "The IDF needs to open a corridor of one kilometer on either side of the road". Settlers in the area had complained that the IDF had not demolished Palestinian homes next to the Kissufim road where the attack took place.

The following day, on May 10, 2004, IDF troops shot dead a 22-year-old local Palestinian when Israeli bulldozers razed a row of homes and a four-storey block of flats was demolished in the Khan Yunis refugee camp a few hundred meters from where the attack took place. Palestinian sources, international aid organizations and media sources variously reported that 75 Palestinians or 50 families were left homeless by the action. By May 10, according to the UN Relief and Works Agency for Palestine Refugees, 1,100 Palestinians had been made homeless by Israeli military raids in Gaza in what they described as "one of the most intense periods of destruction for years" and "illegal collective punishment" for the killing of Tali Hatuel and children. The IDF described the figures as "highly exaggerated" and said they only demolished buildings that they had confirmed had been used by militants to attack Israeli targets.

Near the end of May, during Operation Rainbow, the Israeli army demolished a building across the street from the home of Ibrahim Hammad, one of the perpetrators of the attack on the Hatuel family. According to a neighbor, residents had already left the area on the assumption that Hammad's house would be demolished. According to Human Rights Watch, Hammad's house was not harmed but a house across the street belonging to Mahmoud Abu Arab was bulldozed instead. Abu Arab submitted a claim for compensation from the Israeli authorities.

On September 25, 2005, the Israeli Air Force killed the organizer of the attack, Sheikh Khalil, in a targeted assassination, described by Islamic Jihad as one of its "most senior commanders in Palestine." Khalil, who had survived several previous assassination attempts, died when an Israeli helicopter gunship fired a missile at his car in the Gaza Strip. His deputy was also killed and four others were injured. Israel military officials stated that Khalil had orchestrated several attacks on Israelis.

On June 6, 2007, the IDF arrested Jihad Salah Saliman Abu Dahar, a member of Islamic Jihad from the Khan Yunis area, who according to Shin Bet officials admitted to involvement in violence, including the Hatuel murder. Abu Dahar reportedly admitted to carrying out surveillance of the attack site and IDF patrols in the weeks prior to the murders and on May 2, 2004, he notified his commanders when IDF patrols were absent.

On May 9, 2023, Jihad Ghanem, a top official in the Islamic Jihad military council and one of the orchestrators of the attack on the Hatuel family, was killed during an Israeli airstrike in Gaza City.

== Reactions ==
Ariel Sharon, Prime Minister of Israel at the time, condemned the attack as a "brutal crime against civilians and children." In Damascus, Ramadan Shallah, the leader of Palestinian Islamic Jihad said killing of Israeli women and children was permissible "because they decided spontaneously to go live in a war zone". The attack was strongly condemned by Amnesty International as a deliberate attack against civilians and therefore a crime against humanity as defined by the Rome Statute of the International Criminal Court. The commissioner general of the United Nations agency for Palestinian refugees (UNRWA) condemned the killings of Tali Hatuel and her children but accused the Israel authorities of carrying out reprisal demolitions of Palestinian homes in some areas as a form of collective punishment forbidden by international law.

== Commemoration ==
The funeral, held in Ashkelon the same day as the attack, was attended by thousands of mourners including Moshe Katsav, the President of Israel at the time.

On June 16, 2004, Ben-Gurion University in the Negev awarded Tali Hatuel a posthumous Masters of Arts degree in Social Work, and granted her husband a Masters of Arts in Jewish Philosophy.

On July 25, 2004, Hatuel's husband David was given a place of prominence near the Western Wall in the human chain from the Gaza Strip to Jerusalem protesting against Israel's withdrawal from Gaza in which over 130,000 Israelis took part.

On August 22, 2005, the day Katif was evacuated, David Hatuel addressed the settlers, defining the day as one of destruction and expulsion, thanking his fellow residents for their support after the murder of his wife and children, adding: "We are going through a crisis, an unfathomable hardship; but we will not despair and we will not fall." In December of the same year, he married Limor Shem-Tov, an occupational therapist, stating: "I have two options, either to collapse or to continue living. I have chosen life! My new home is an addition and not a replacement of the home that was destroyed. I am like a tree whose branches were cut off and now they are growing again." He and Shem-Tov had three sons and a daughter.
