= Gush Katif Airport =

Former airport in Gaza Strip, Palestine

Gush Katif Airport مطار غوش قطيف
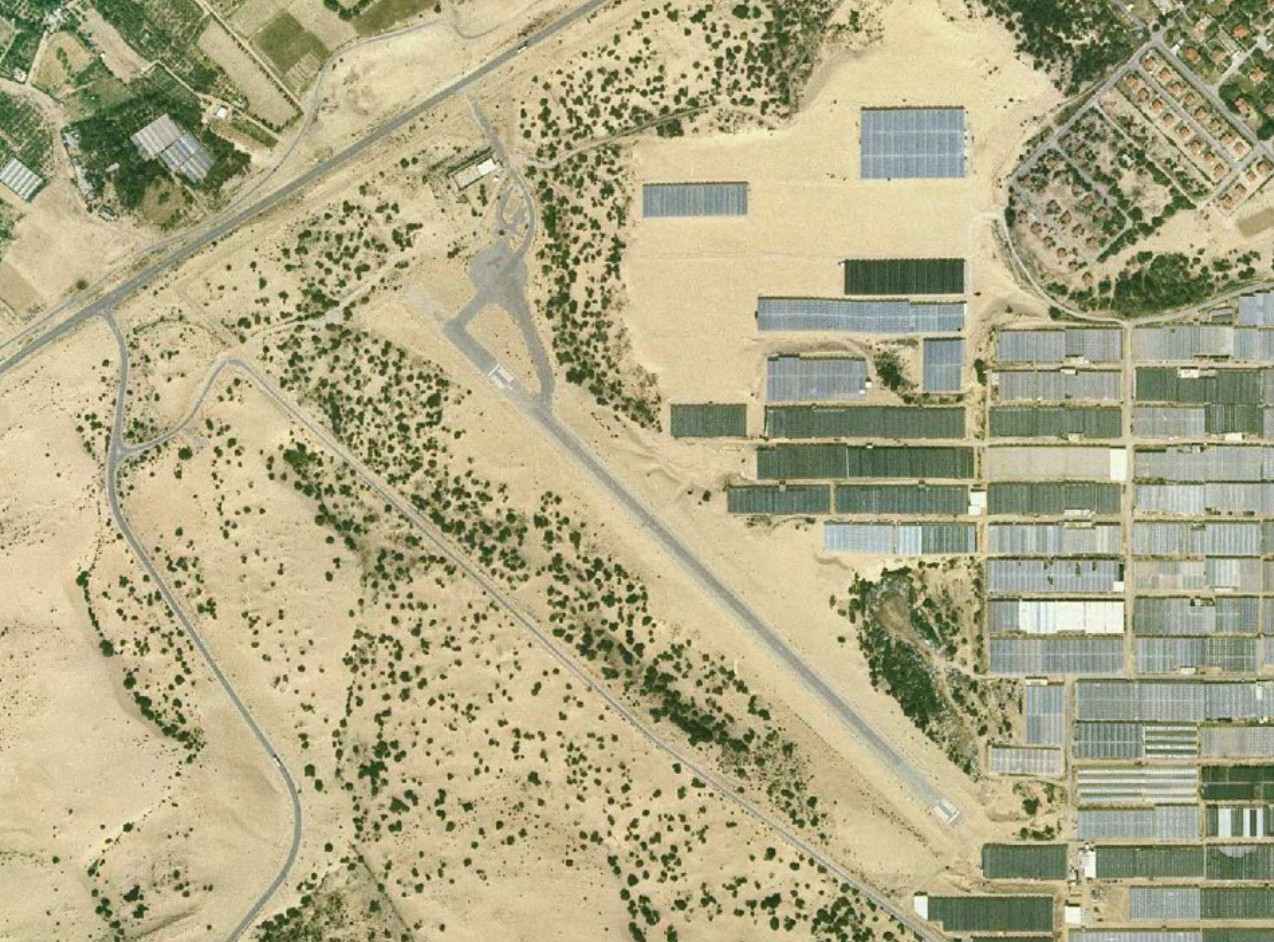
- 2004 satellite image showing runway.
- IATA: GHK; ICAO: LLAZ

Summary
- Owner: None
- Operator: None
- Serves: Gaza Strip
- Location: Khan Yunis, Gaza Strip, Palestine
- Elevation AMSL: 107 ft (33 m)
- Coordinates: 31°22′03″N 34°17′41″E
- Interactive map of Gush Katif Airport

Runways
Direction	Length		Surface
Direction	m	ft	Surface
13/31	800	2,625	Asphalt
- Abandoned and overbuilt following evacuation of the Gush Katif area in 2004

Gush Katif Airport (IATA: GHK, ICAO: LLAZ) (Arabic: مطار غوش قطيف, romanized: Maṭār Ghūsh Qaṭīf) is a small abandoned airfield in Gaza Strip, approximately three kilometres (2 mi) north of the town of Khan Yunis, and adjacent to the UNRWA Khan Yunis refugee camp. It was located immediately west of the former Israeli village of Ganei Tal, and named after the former Israeli area of Gush Katif. Following the destruction of the Yasser Arafat International Airport, it was briefly the only usable runway in the Gaza Strip before it was abandoned in 2004 and overbuilt by 2015. A small sand strip covers the runway.

== History ==
The airstrip should not be confused with RAF Gaza, which was in the vicinity of the present day Karni Crossing.

After the 1948 Arab–Israeli War, 35,000 refugees took shelter in a camp to the south of the present day airfield. This has become the UNRWA Khan Younis camp.

As part of the unilateral disengagement of Israel from Gaza, Israeli settlers were evicted from the Gush Katif area in 2005. In 2004, the airfield was in a good state of repair. The runway was kept clear, and runway markings were maintained. Following the handover to the Palestinian authorities along with the rest of Gush Katif, the airstrip was no longer maintained. It became partially covered by sand and reduced from a width of 23 m (75 ft) to approximately 9 m (30 ft) of usable tarmac, and the 69 m (225 ft) overrun and backtracking loop at the northwest end became blocked with sand.

In 2010, the main 800 m (2,625 ft) runway was still sufficiently clear to be used, due to its use as an access road for the Khan Younis refugee camp.

By 2014, aerial imagery made it clear that the expansion of the Khan Younis refugee camp, which included the construction of a sewage treatment plant on the former runway threshold, made the airport entirely unusable.
