= Gan Or =

Former Israeli settlement in the Gaza Strip

Gan Or: גַּן אוֹר (Hebrew)
- Former Israeli settlement
- Etymology: Garden of Light
- Location within the Gaza Strip
- Coordinates: 31°20′12″N 34°15′34″E
- Country: Israel
- Affiliation: HaPoel HaMizrahi
- Founded: 1983
- Founder: Graduates of Bnei Akiva and hesder yeshivas

Gan Or (Hebrew: גַּן אוֹר, lit. Garden of Light) was an Israeli settlement located in the Gush Katif settlement bloc and evacuated in Israel's disengagement of 2005. On the day of its evacuation 52 families, over 320 people, lived there.

== History ==
Gan Or was founded in 1980 as an Orthodox moshav by a group of former members of the Bnei Akiva Mizrahi youth group and the Hesder yeshiva program at Netzarim and moved to its current location in 1983. Prior to evacuation, the community, over 50 families, had built a synagogue and adjacent events hall. Most residents earned their living from cultivating vegetables and leafy greens in greenhouses. The community operated kindergartens and daycare centers. School-age children studied in Neve Dekalim at the regional “Ne’ot Katif” school. The Tohar Girls College, which was founded in 2000 and offered combined religious studies and academic courses at the Open University and at Bar-Ilan University's campus at nearby Ashkelon, has been relocated.

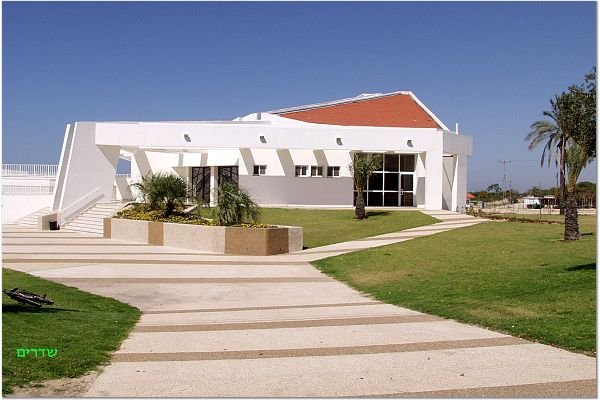
Gan Or Synagogue

== Unilateral disengagement ==
Gan Or was officially evacuated on August 18, 2005 by the Israeli Army and Israeli Police, though most of the residents had left earlier. A majority of the families moved to the temporary refuge of Nitzan to which several hundred evacuated families from Gush Katif were relocated.
