= Bedolah =

Former Israeli settlement in the Gaza Strip

Bedolah: בְּדֹלַח, בדולח (Hebrew)
- Former Israeli settlement
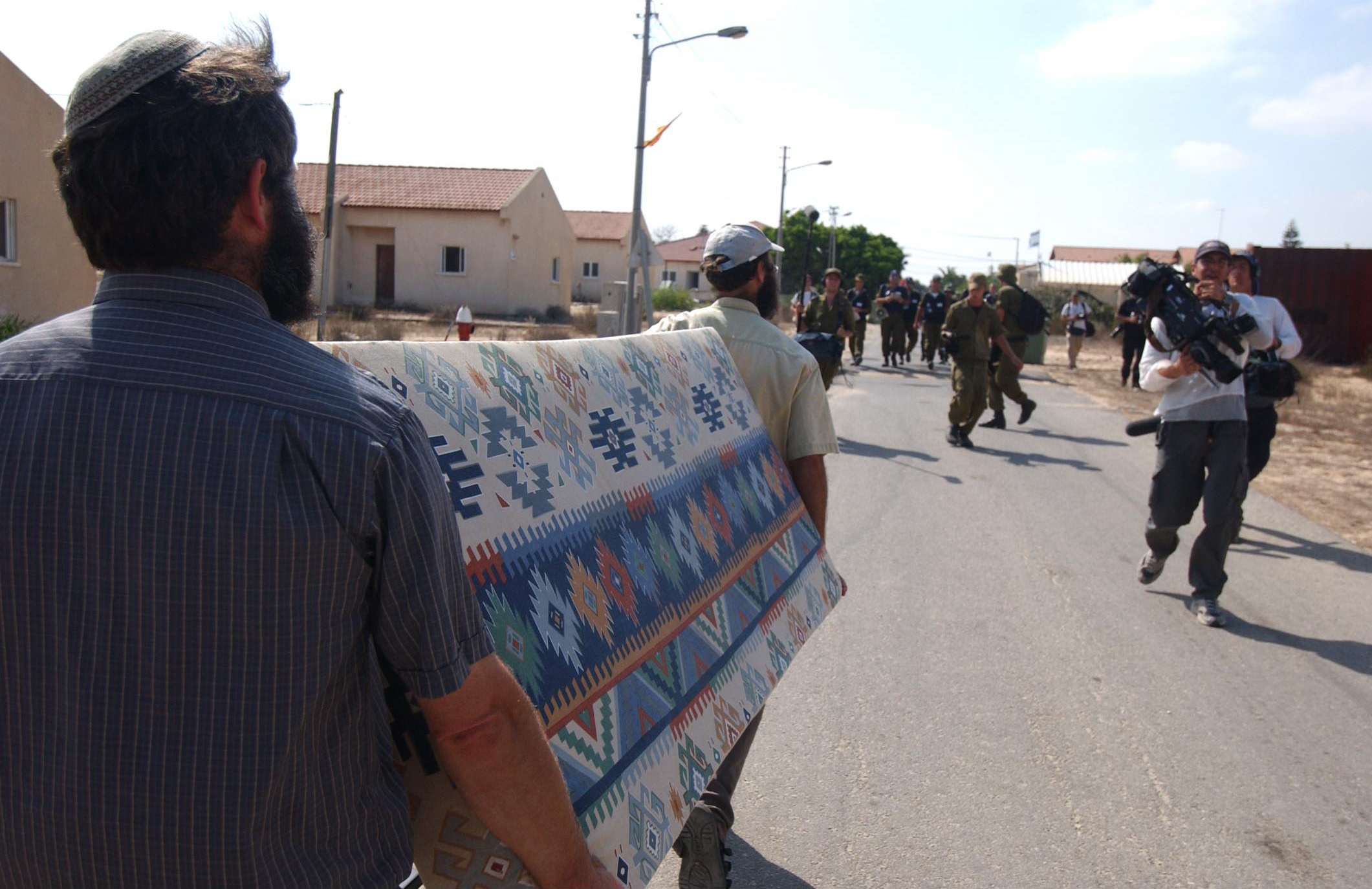
- Evacuation of Bedolach, 2005
- Etymology: Crystal
- Location within the Gaza Strip
- Coordinates: 31°19′46″N 34°15′21″E
- Country: Israel
- Founded: 1986
- Founder: Orthodox Jews

Bedolah (Hebrew: בְּדֹלַח, lit. 'Crystal') was an Israeli settlement and army base in the Gush Katif settlement bloc, located in the southwest edge of the Gaza Strip. Home to 220 religious Jews, its inhabitants were evicted, its houses demolished, and its land surrendered to the Palestinian National Authority as part of Israel's disengagement of 2005.

== History ==
Bedolah was founded as a paramilitary Nahal settlement in 1979, and handed over to civilians in 1986 as an Orthodox agricultural settlement. It was home to 33 settlement's families and a population of 220. Most residents were from a group of children of the Moshavim from the Western Negev and the Tel Mond area. The settlement has also absorbed a group of immigrant families from France.

Its main industry was hothouse crops such as vegetables and flowers.

The residents of Bedolah were forcibly evicted from their homes on August 17, 2005, by the 'blue' brigade composed mostly of Israeli Air Force personnel.
