= Pe'at Sadeh =

Former Israeli settlement in the Gaza Strip

Pe'at Sadeh: פְּאַת שָׂדֶה (Hebrew)
- Former Israeli settlement
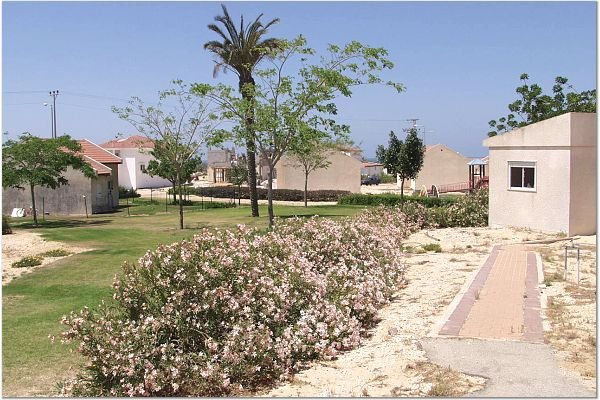

- Location within the Gaza Strip
- Coordinates: 31°19′29″N 34°14′27″E
- Country: Israel
- Founded: 1989, 1993 (latest location)

Pe'at Sadeh (Hebrew: פְּאַת שָׂדֶה, lit. Mouth Field) was an Israeli settlement in the Gaza Strip that existed until 2005.

== History ==
Pe'at Sadeh was originally established in 1989 by a group of families on the 'Slav' Israel Defense Forces base in the southern end of Gush Katif and moved to its later site on an adjacent hill in 1993. It was one of the few partially secular settlements in the primarily Orthodox Gush Katif settlement bloc.

Its name is a reference to Pe'a (Hebrew: פאה), a form of Jewish charity in which the corner of a field, vineyard or orchard is left unharvested for the poor to come and take what they need. Sadeh is Hebrew for field.

As part of Israel's plan to unilaterally disengage from the Gaza Strip, the residents signed a consentual evacuation agreement with the Israel Defense Forces in late 2004. The settlement's residents conducted a farewell ceremony on 9 August 2005, after which they were evicted over several days while the settlement's structures were destroyed. The residents subsequently relocated to Mavki'im.
