= Nisanit =

Former Israeli settlement in the Gaza Strip

Nisanit: נִיסָנִית (Hebrew)
- Former Israeli settlement
- Location within the Gaza Strip
- Coordinates: 31°33′43″N 34°31′54″E
- Country: Israel
- Founded: 1993

Nisanit (Hebrew: נִיסָנִית) was the largest Israeli settlement in the northern tip of the Gaza Strip in a mini-settlement bloc including Elei Sinai and Dugit. While Nisanit was under the municipal authority of the Hof Aza Regional Council it was not physically in the Gush Katif bloc where the bulk of the 'Gush Katif' settlements were located. During the Gaza war, the site came under full operational control of the Israel Defense Forces and is currently used as a military outpost.

== History ==
The village was established as a Nahal military outpost in 1980 and demilitarized when turned over for civilian residential purposes in 1984 to 15 pioneer families. In 1993, its status was changed to "urban community". Nisanit also served as a satellite municipal branch of the regional council for the three northern Gaza Strip settlements. The name of the town is the Hebrew translation of the hawksbeard flower which is widespread in the area's sand dunes in spring.

Nisanit, which numbered about 300 families (around 900 people), was one of the few "mixed" Gaza Strip settlements with Orthodox and non-religious Jews living together.

== Unilateral disengagement ==
Nisanit's residents were evicted on 21 August 2005 by Israeli Army and Israeli Police personnel as part of the unilateral disengagement plan. The houses were destroyed and the area was abandoned.

== Drive to rebuild ==
On July 26, 2007, some 500 activists, including former residents, attempted to return to the ruins as a beginning to rebuilding the community. Police attempted to stop the march before it reached the Gaza border but did not succeed though several arrests were made. Organizers vowed to continue plans for a future return to Nisanit.

== 2023 Gaza war ==
The site of Nisanit was captured by the IDF following the invasion of its ground forces into the Gaza Strip on October 27, 2023. Their entry into Nisanit was part of a pincer move to surround Gaza City, located to the south of Nisanit.
