= Slav (Israeli settlement) =

Former Israeli settlement in the Gaza Strip

Slav: שְׂלָו, שליו (Hebrew)
- Former Israeli settlement
- Location within the Gaza Strip
- Coordinates: 31°19′19″N 34°14′18″E
- Country: Israel
- Founded: 1980

Slav (Hebrew: שְׂלָו, lit. 'quail') was an Israeli settlement in the Gush Katif settlement bloc, located in the south-west edge of the Gaza Strip that existed until 2005.

== History ==
Slav was founded as a paramilitary Nahal settlement in 1980. The settlement was named after the bird that the Israelites ate in the desert during the Exodus from Egypt.

In 1982, with the signing of the Israel-Egypt Peace Treaty and subsequent withdrawal from the Sinai Peninsula, Slav became a transit camp of former residents evicted from Sinai and temporary home to the Midreshet Hadarom girls' seminary. At the beginning of the 90's, the location was divided into a military base and a residential civilian area with several families. In 2001, a small group of people including staff and students of the nearby 'Otzem' pre-military preparatory school in Bnei Atzmon moved to settle the village and strengthen its numbers.

The residents of Slav were evicted by the Israel Defense Forces on 20 August 2005, as part of Israel's unilateral disengagement plan. The houses were destroyed by 24 August and the area was abandoned.
