= Gadid =

Former Israeli settlement in the Gaza Strip

Gadid: גָּדִיד (Hebrew)
- Former Israeli settlement
- Location within the Gaza Strip
- Coordinates: 31°20′39″N 34°16′38″E
- Country: Israel
- Founded: 1982
- Founder: Orthodox Jews

Gadid (Hebrew: גָּדִיד) was an Israeli settlement and Moshav located in the middle of the Gush Katif settlement bloc whose residents were expelled in Israel's disengagement of 2005. The origin of the name Gadid comes from the term used in the bible to describe the harvest of dates in the area.

== History ==
Gadid was founded in 1982 as an Orthodox moshav by a group of 22 families, mostly new immigrants from France, as well as families from the Bnei Akiva Mizrachi youth group. Most residents earned their living from hothouse crops such as leafy vegetables, tomatoes, flowers, and herbs. A unique characteristic of Gadid was that each family's agricultural land was adjacent to its home. The village also housed an absorption center (built in 1999) for new immigrants from France. A cottage industry for herbal remedies was one of the most prominent local initiatives and operated by the Barbei family.

The residents of Gadid was forcibly evicted from their homes on August 19, 2005, by the Israeli Army and Israeli Police, and their homes were razed soon after. On the day of its residents' expulsion it was home to about sixty families, including over 310 people.
