= Rafiah Yam =

Former Israeli settlement in the Gaza Strip

Rafiah Yam: רָפִיחַ יָם (Hebrew)
- Former Israeli settlement
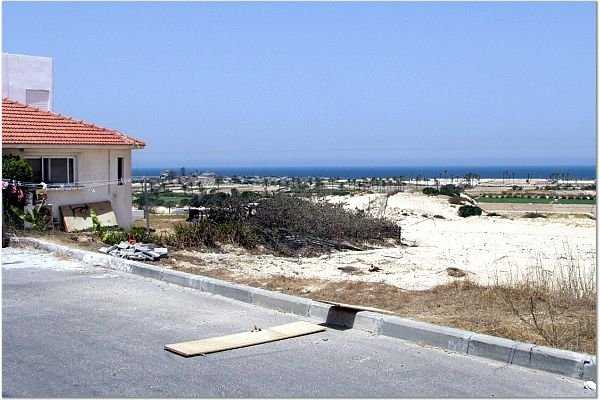

- Location within the Gaza Strip
- Coordinates: 31°19′0″N 34°13′44″E
- Country: Israel
- Founded: 1984, 1991 (latest location)

Rafiah Yam (Hebrew: רָפִיחַ יָם) was an Israeli settlement in the Gaza Strip that existed until 2005.

== History ==
Rafiah Yam was originally established in 1984 as a mixed orthodox-secular community in the southern end of the Gush Katif settlement bloc, only 200 metres from the Egyptian border and close to the Palestinian city of Rafah. The residents originally lived in caravans, but moved to permanent housing in a nearby location in 1991.

Residents of the settlement worked mainly in agriculture. Being one of the few non-Orthodox settlements, the community children were bused each day to school in the nearby Eshkol region outside the Gaza Strip.

The 30 families, including at least 150 people, of Rafiah Yam were forcibly evicted from their homes by the Israel Defense Forces and Israeli Police as part of the Israel's unilateral disengagement plan, in August 2005. Their houses and other structures were destroyed and the area was abandoned.
