= Katif (Israeli settlement) =

Former Israeli settlement in the Gaza Strip

Katif: קָטִיף (Hebrew)
- Former Israeli settlement
- Location within the Gaza Strip
- Coordinates: 31°22′31″N 34°18′46″E
- Country: Israel
- Founded: 1985
- Founder: Bnei Akiva graduates

Katif (Hebrew: קָטִיף) was an Israeli settlement in the Gush Katif bloc in the Gaza Strip, about 1 km north of the Palestinian refugee camp of Deir al-Balah Camp.

== History ==
Katif was founded as a moshav in 1977 by Orthodox Jews. The name is derived from the archeological site nearby, Tel Katifa.

Katif was founded as a paramilitary Nahal settlement in 1973, and handed over to civilians in 1977. Some 70 families, or 330 people, including 220 children, lived in the moshav. A religious elementary school and a high school located there served many of the other settlements in the region. The economy was based on a plastics factory, a fabric factory, and agriculture, including a nursery and a dairy farm.

Like all the Israeli settlements in the Gaza Strip, Katif was evacuated as part of the unilateral disengagement plan, decided on by the Israeli government in 2004.

After their eviction, most of the families (forty-five) chose to move to a temporary refugee camp adjacent to Amatzia, a previously non-religious moshav of thirty-five families, and start planning their permanent settlement in the area.
