= Ganei Tal (Israeli settlement) =

Former Israeli settlement in the Gaza Strip

Ganei Tal: גַּנֵּי טַל (Hebrew)
- Former Israeli settlement
- Etymology: Gardens of Dew
- Location within the Gaza Strip
- Coordinates: 31°22′25″N 34°18′06″E
- Country: Israel
- Council: Hof Aza
- Founded: 1979
- Founder: Bnei Akiva graduates

Ganei Tal (Hebrew: גַּנֵּי טַל, lit. 'Gardens of Dew') was an Israeli settlement in the south of the Gaza Strip, located in the Gush Katif settlement bloc. It was under the jurisdiction of Hof Aza Regional Council.

== History ==
Ganei Tal was established as a moshav in 1979 with a primarily agricultural purpose; exporting geraniums and tomatoes to Europe. It had a population of some 75 families, or 500 people.

Lined with stucco buildings and greenhouses, it sat next to the Palestinian city of Khan Yunis, which was the source of many rocket attacks against the settlement.

== Unilateral disengagement ==
The residents of Ganei Tal were forcibly evicted from their homes on 17 August 2005 as part of the unilateral disengagement plan, decided on by the Israeli government in 2004. Their houses were destroyed once the evictions were complete. A new village called Ganei Tal was later established in central Israel by the former settlers.

== Palestinian plans ==
In 2007, Hamas announced plans to build a "media city" on the site.
