= Morag (Israeli settlement) =

Former Israeli settlement in the Gaza Strip

Morag: מוֹרַג (Hebrew)
- Former Israeli settlement
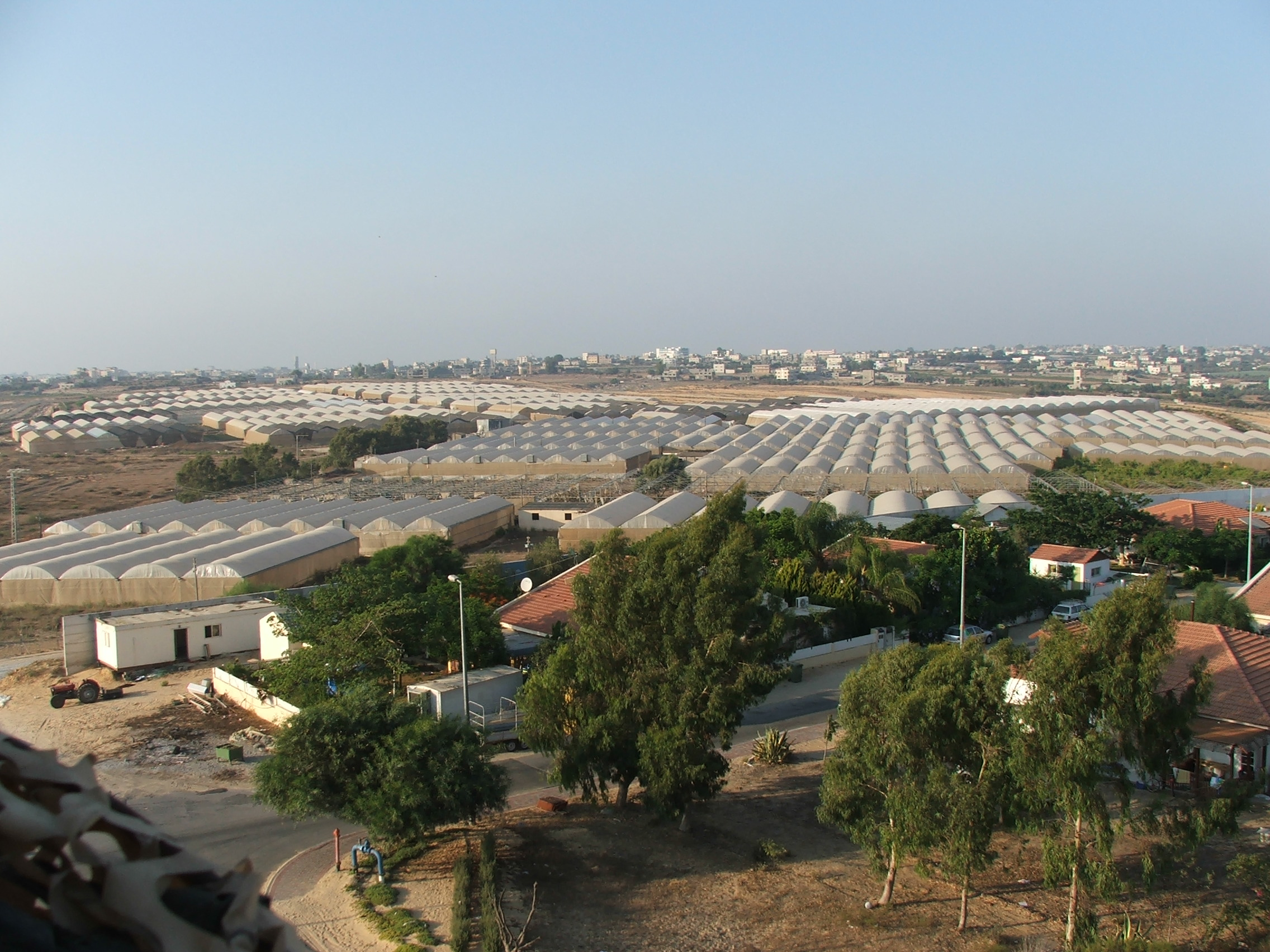
- Hothouses in Morag
- Etymology: Flail
- Location within the Gaza Strip
- Coordinates: 31°18′30″N 34°17′17″E
- Country: Israel
- Affiliation: HaPoel HaMizrahi
- Founded: 1983

Morag (Hebrew: מוֹרַג, lit. 'Flail') was an Israeli settlement organized as a moshav in the Gush Katif settlement bloc. in the south-west edge of the Gaza Strip. It was evacuated as part of Israel's unilateral disengagement plan of 2005.

== History ==
Morag was the southernmost settlement in Gush Katif. It was first established on 29 May 1972, as a secular pioneer Nahal military outpost, and demilitarized when turned over to residential purposes in 1982. It later became a religious agricultural worker cooperative, whose residents earned their living growing flowers and vegetables in hothouses. At the time of the evacuation, there were about forty families including about 200 people.

== Unilateral disengagement ==
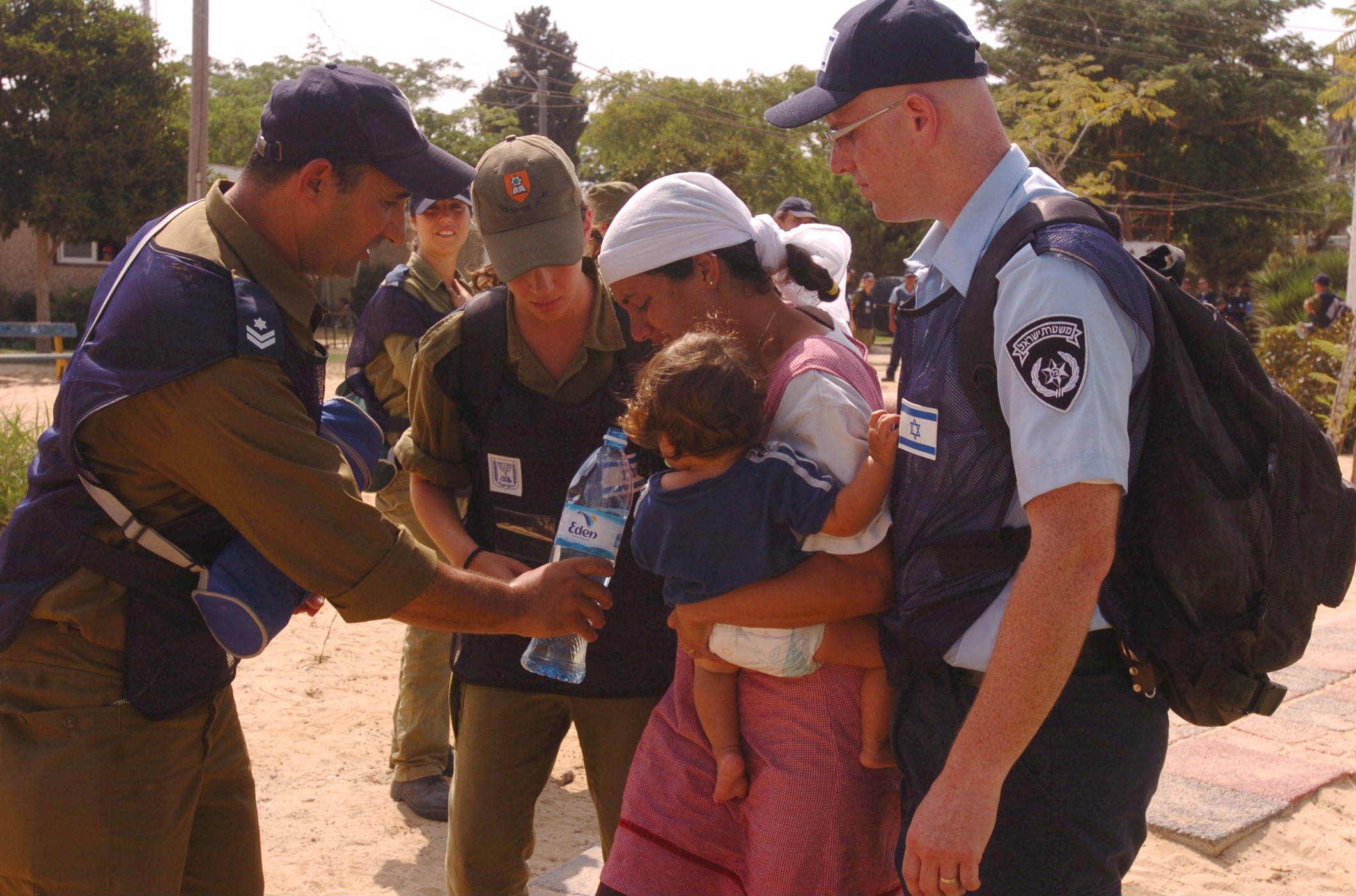
IDF and police personnel evacuating Morag residents

Sixteen families of Morag were evicted on August 17, 2005, by the Israel Defense Forces (IDF) and Israeli Police. Others had left earlier following the government orders.

== Palestinian plans ==
On the ruins of the former village, a Palestinian locality has been announced called Sheikh Khalifa City. The site is named after United Arab Emirates President Khalifa bin Zayed Al Nahyan due to his funding of the project.

== Gaza War ==
On 2 April 2025, Prime Minister Benjamin Netanyahu announced the creation of the Morag Corridor on the site of this settlement, following the resumption of combat between Israel and Hamas in the Gaza Strip after the breakdown of the ceasefire implemented in January 2025.
