= Bnei Akiva =

Largest religious Zionist youth movement in the world

World Bnei Akiva בני עקיבא העולמית
- World Bnei Akiva logo

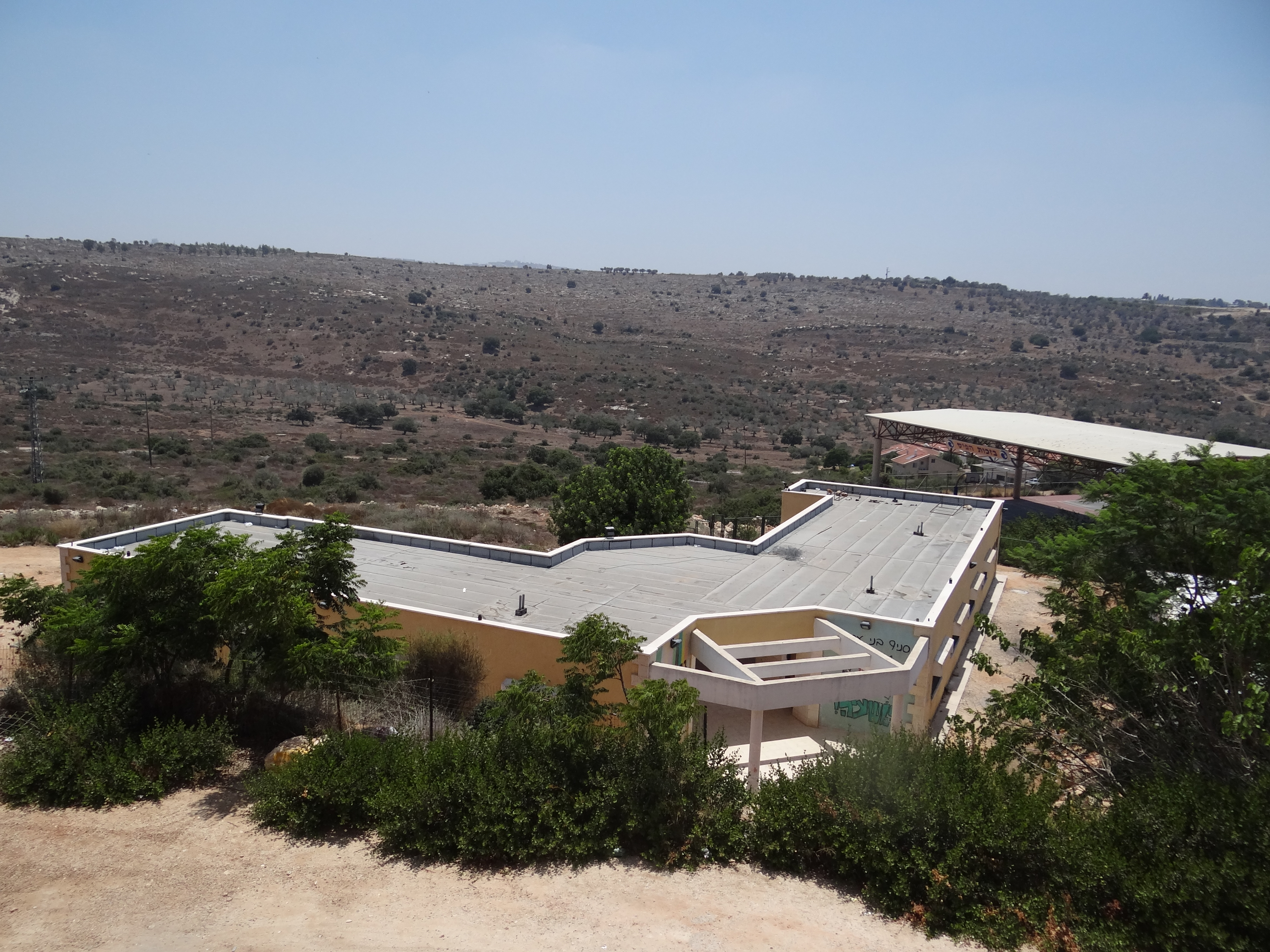
- Bnei Akiva building in Hoshaya, Israel
- Formation: May 28, 1929; 97 years ago
- Type: Jewish Youth Movement
- Legal status: Non-profit organization
- Purpose: Educational
- Headquarters: Jerusalem, Israel
- Location: 54 King George Street, Jerusalem, Israel
- Coordinates: 31°46.892′N 35°12.988′E
- Region served: Worldwide
- Members: ~125,000
- Secretary General: Yigal Klein
- Parent organization: Hapoel HaMizrachi
- Staff: 25 (2016)
- Website: www.worldbneiakiva.org

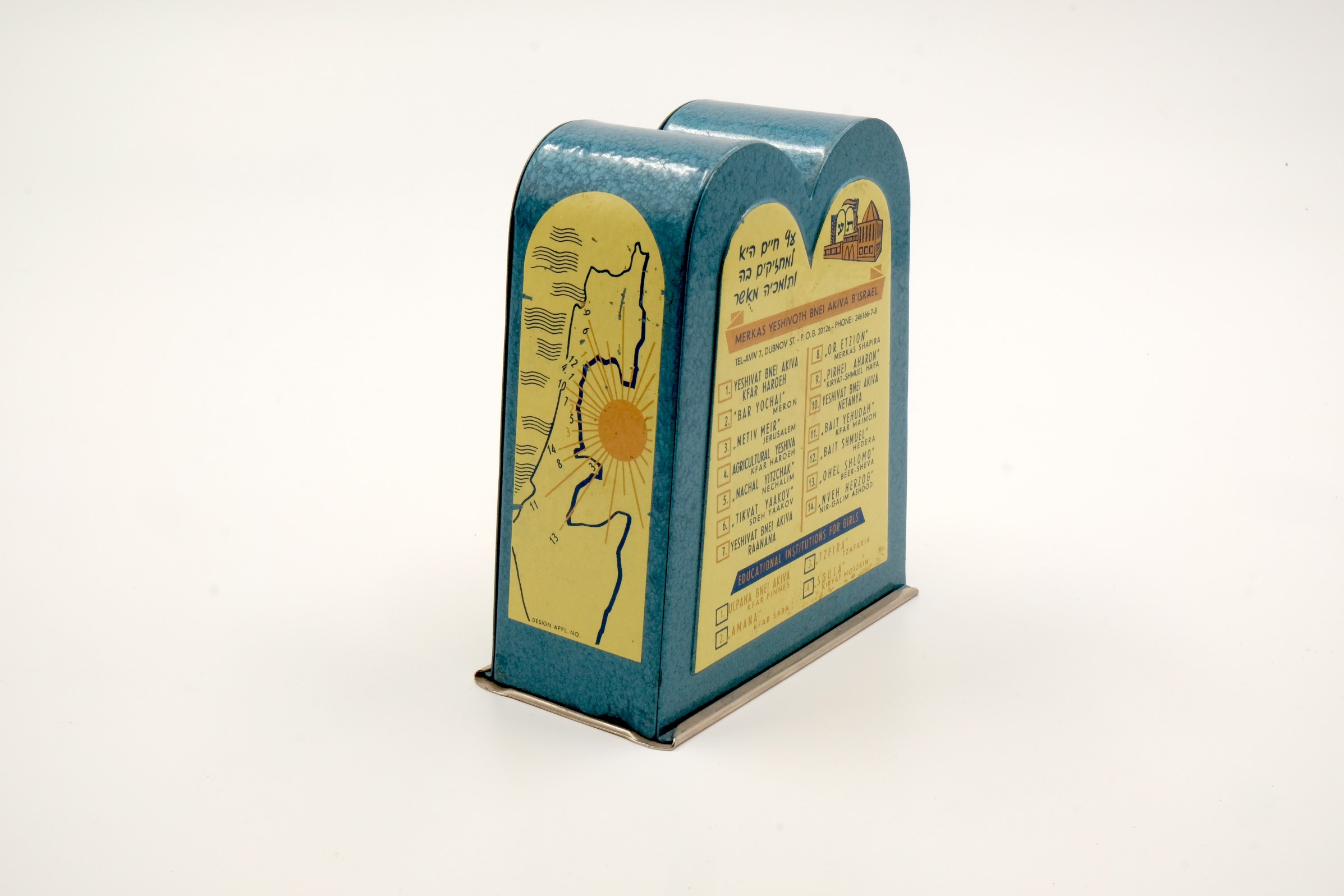
Donation box of the Merkas Yeshivot Bnei Akiva B'Israel, 1960-70s, Tel Aviv, in the collection of the Jewish Museum of Switzerland.

Bnei Akiva (Hebrew: בְּנֵי עֲקִיבָא, /bneɪ əkivə/, "Children of Akiva") is the largest religious Zionist youth movement in the world, with over 125,000 members in 42 countries. It was first established in Mandatory Palestine in 1929, advocating the values of Torah and labor.

Bnei Akiva in Israel is the central youth movement of the religious Zionist public in Israel and the third-largest youth movement in Israel. As of 2026, the movement's Secretary-General in Israel is Yigal Klein, replacing Yair Shagal.

== History ==
Bnei Akiva was established on Lag BaOmer 1929 as the youth wing of the Mizrachi movement. Concurrent with the establishment of the movement in pre-independence Israel, organizations of religious youth operated in the Diaspora. In 1958, the Israeli and Diaspora groups merged to form the modern World Bnei Akiva, which operates both in and out of Israel for Diaspora youth, along with Bnei Akiva Israel, which operates in Israel for Israeli youth.

== Ideology ==
Bnei Akiva's objectives are to educate Jewish youth with values of Torah and work, to provide stimulating experiential and informal opportunities for encountering Judaism, and to encourage Jewish continuity and leadership. Bnei Akiva's twin ideals of Torah and Avodah translate to religious commitment and work on the land of Israel. Bnei Akiva believes in emigration to the land of Israel (Aliya) as a central commandment of Judaism, and maintains that the future of the Jewish people is tied to the state of Israel. In the organization's early years, Avodah was understood as meaning agricultural work, as reflected in the symbolism of the movement's emblem. In more recent years, there has been a shift in ideology towards a broader definition of working for the development of the country. Members are encouraged to spend a year in Israel on organized learning and touring programs to broaden their knowledge of Israel and develop their leadership skills.

Similarly, the original socialist aims of Bnei Akiva are less actively pursued. Until the 1980s many Bnei Akiva members joined religious Kibbutzim in groups based on mutual army service or Aliyah. Since the 1990s, Bnei Akiva members now typically settle in development towns and settlements.

Bnei Akiva actively promotes moving to the state of Israel in a process called Aliyah (literally meaning "to go up"), but the way in which this occurs has changed over the years. Until the 1990s, chanichim (trainees, disciples) were encouraged to make Aliyah in garinim (kernels, small groups) intended to bolster existing communities. These were almost always directed to a Kibbutz Hadati, and fierce debates took place as to whether any other form of Aliyah was a valid expression of the movement's ideals. Today the push for Aliyah is more general, with no specific communities or framework in mind. The focus is more on coming to Israel and contributing positively to society in any way.

== Organizational framework ==
In Israel, Bnei Akiva is affiliated with the Religious Kibbutz Movement. It is run by a National Secretariat (Hanhala Artzit). Outside Israel, local branches of Bnei Akiva are under the Bnei Akiva Olami (Worldwide) organization. In every country, Bnei Akiva operates a network of Shabbat groups (svivot), summer camps (machanot), leadership seminars, Shabbatonim, and other activities. They also operate gap year courses in Israel which are available to worldwide members.

Each age group from third grade to eighth grade has a section common to all scouts of the youth movement in Israel and around the world.

=== Activity Structure ===
The movement accepts members from 3rd grade for a preparation month, and after this month, they become an integral part of the movement. Each age group, from 3rd to 8th grade, has a tribal name shared by all members in Israel and around the world within the same age group. The tribe's name changes at the end of the last Sabbath of the movement's organizational month.

==== The tribal names ====
- Zra'im/Preparation (3rd/4th grade)
- Nevatim (4th grade)
- Nitzanim (5th grade)
- Ma'alot (6th grade)
- Ma'apilim (7th grade)
- HaRo'eh (8th grade).
- A new name (9th grade). Upon receiving the new name, members transition from Chevraya Aleph ("Company One") to the next stage, Chevraya Bet ("Company Two").

=== Camp Moshava ===
Bnei Akiva of the United States and Canada sponsors summer camps, known as Camp Moshava. The first Moshava, in Hightstown, New Jersey, was established in 1936. The largest camp is located in Texas Township, Pennsylvania, with 1,500 campers and 400 counselors.

== Symbols of Bnei Akiva ==
=== Emblem ===
Bnei Akiva's emblem displays wheat and farming tools (such as scythe and pitchfork), symbolizing the agricultural perspective of the ideology. It also shows the Tablets of Stone, displaying two letters of the Hebrew alphabet that stand for Torah VeAvoda, which means "Torah and work". The two perspectives of Torah and Avoda are tied together by the ribbon which displays the text "Bnei Akiva" on it.

=== Mifkad ===
Bnei Akiva branches all over the world start or end their meetings with mifkad, forming the letter Heth (Hebrew: ח, a rectangle missing one of its smaller sides) using the participants. The mifkad is the assembly where announcements are made, members are counted and the ideology is reaffirmed. With slight variations, the text of mifkad is the same all over the world, following a basic structure.

== Notable alumni ==
For a partial list of the movement's notable alumni see: Bnei Akiva Alumni

== See also ==
- History of Zionism
- National Religious Party
- Orthodox Judaism
