= Bnei Atzmon =

Former Israeli settlement in the Sinai Peninsula and Gaza Strip

Bnei Atzmon: בְּנֵי עַצְמוֹן (Hebrew)
- Former Israeli settlement
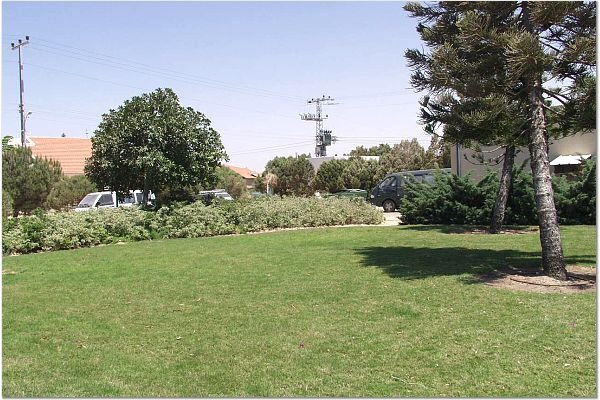
- Etymology: Sons of Atzmon
- Location within the Gaza Strip
- Coordinates: 31°19′18″N 34°15′06″E
- Country: Israel
- Founded: 1978
- Founder: Orthodox Jews

Bnei Atzmon (Hebrew: בְּנֵי עַצְמוֹן) was an Israeli settlement previously in the Sinai Peninsula, later moved to the Gaza Strip before being destroyed in 2005.

== History ==
Bnei Atzmon was founded in 1979 in the Yamit region of the Sinai Peninsula as a response to the Camp David Accords, which promoted trading territory for peace.

In 1982, the settlement was relocated to the Gush Katif region of the Gaza Strip about three kilometres north of Rafah after the signing of the Israel-Egypt Peace Treaty and the subsequent eviction of all Jews living in Sinai and surrender of all land there. The settlement in Sinai was originally named Atzmona, but since that location was evacuated and Israeli law forbids renaming a new location with that of a previously existing legal entity, Bnei Atzmon (Sons of Atzmon, named after the Biblical border point of Israel (Numbers 34:4-5)), became the officially registered name. Nonetheless, it is more often referred to as Atzmona. The moshav's mostly Orthodox Jewish was associated with the Amana settlement organization.

On March 7, 2002, a terrorist from Hamas killed 5 Israeli civilians aged 18 and injured 23 others.

It was destroyed in 2005 by the Israeli government as part of the Israeli disengagement from Gaza.

== Education ==
The Regional Talmud Torah School for nearby children was located in Bnei Atzmon, as well as the prestigious religious pre-army Mechina, Otzem, with 150 students under the leadership of the Rabbi Rafi Peretz. On the settlement was a branch of the Ariel youth organization.

== Economy ==
Several local industries provided employment for residents areas including the "Atzmona nursery" for house plants, which was the second largest in Israel and a factory producing cleaning materials.

In the cooperative settlement, there was area of more than 50,000 dunams (50 km^{2}) of field crops in the Besor area, 12 dunams (12,000 m^{2}) of turkey coops, a barn, and a building company.

== Evacuation ==
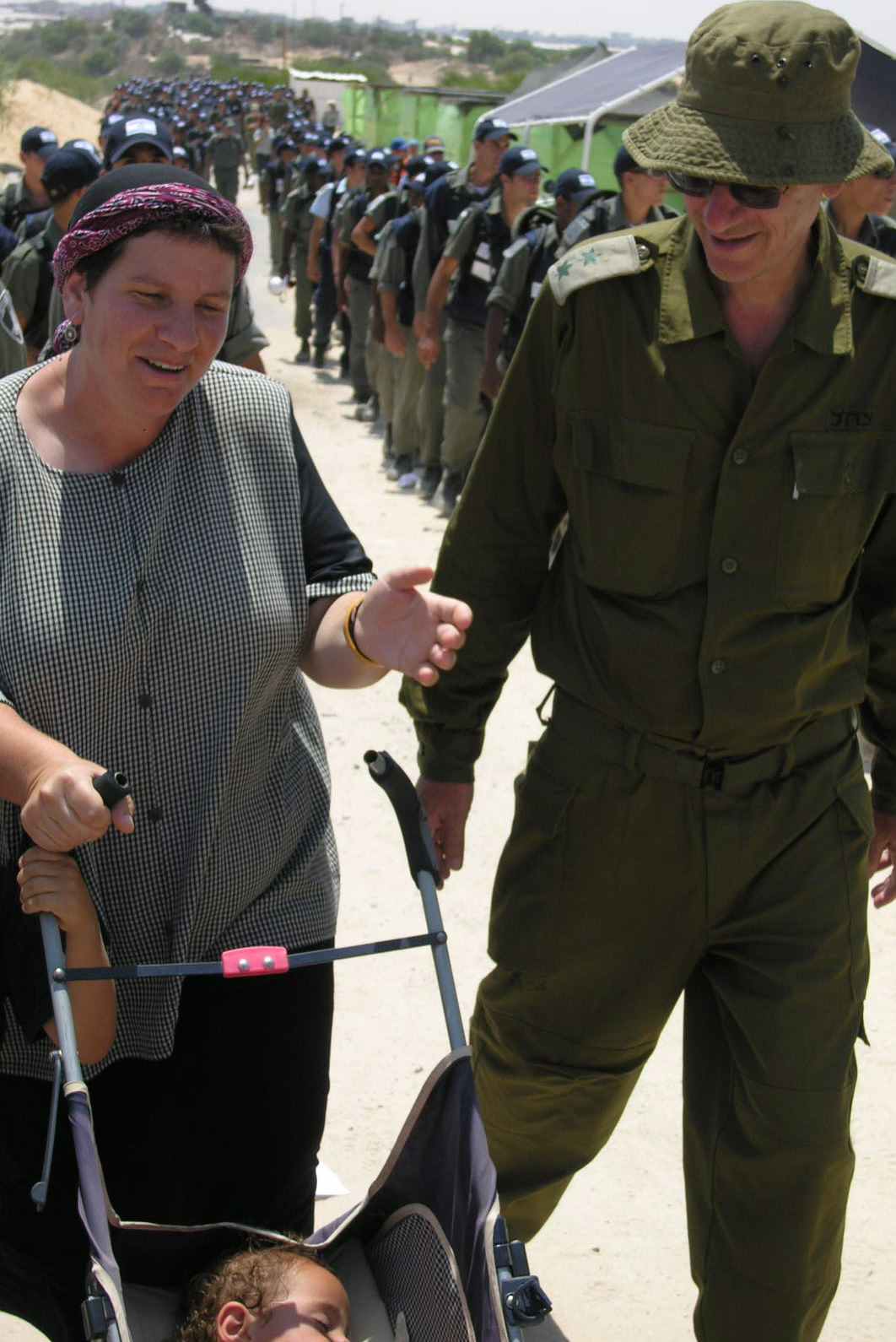
Residents of Bnei Atzmon during evacuation

It was home to about 90 families, including just under 600 people, at the time of its destruction as a result of Israel's unilateral disengagement plan on August 17, 2005. While some form of opposition had been expected from residents in this nationalistic settlement, the actual expulsion was carried out without active or even passive resistance. The pre-army preparatory program was also pulled without resistance, with the participation of several senior army officers who had been invited especially for this "pull-out."

Many of the residents from the settlement resettled in the new moshav Naveh.
