= Neve Dekalim =

Israeli settlement in the Gaza Strip (1983–2005)

Neve Dekalim: נְוֵה דְּקָלִים (Hebrew)
- Former Israeli settlement
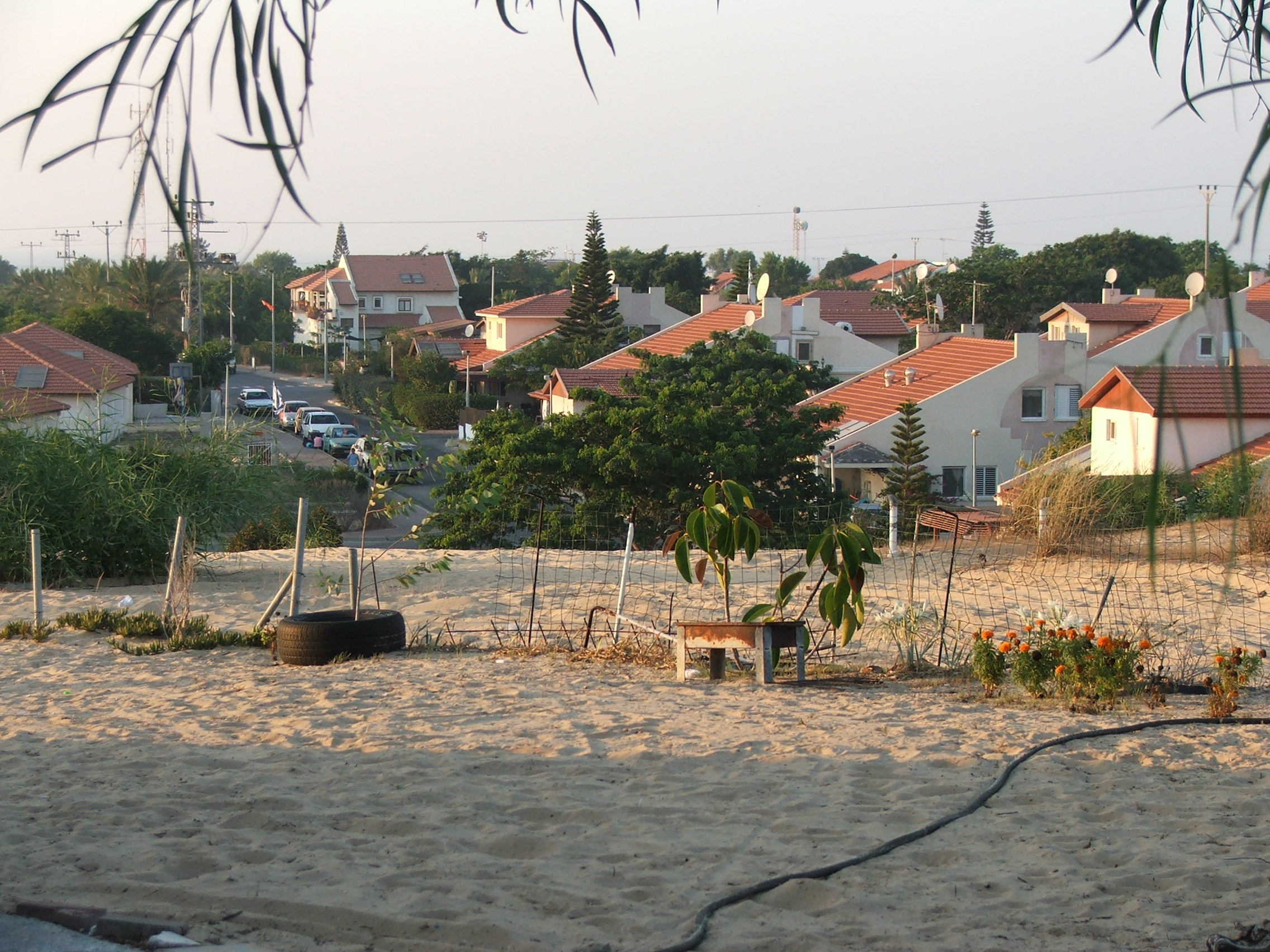
- Etymology: Oasis of Palms
- Location within State of Palestine
- Coordinates: 31°21′24″N 34°16′30″E
- Country: Israel (de facto)
- Council: Hof Aza Regional Council
- Region: Gaza Strip
- Founded: 1983
- Population (2001): 2,600

Neve Dekalim (Hebrew: נְוֵה דְּקָלִים, lit. 'Oasis of Palms') was an Israeli settlement in the Gaza Strip. Comprising a part of Gush Katif, it was founded in 1983, shortly after Israel withdrew from the Sinai Peninsula to fulfill the Egypt–Israel peace treaty. It served as a regional centre for the Gush Katif settlement bloc and was the seat of the defunct Hof Aza Regional Council. The settlement was located in between the Mediterranean Sea and the Khan Yunis refugee camp. In August 2005, Neve Dekalim was dismantled by the Israeli government in pursuit of the Disengagement Plan Implementation Law, which had been approved by the Knesset six months earlier.

== History ==
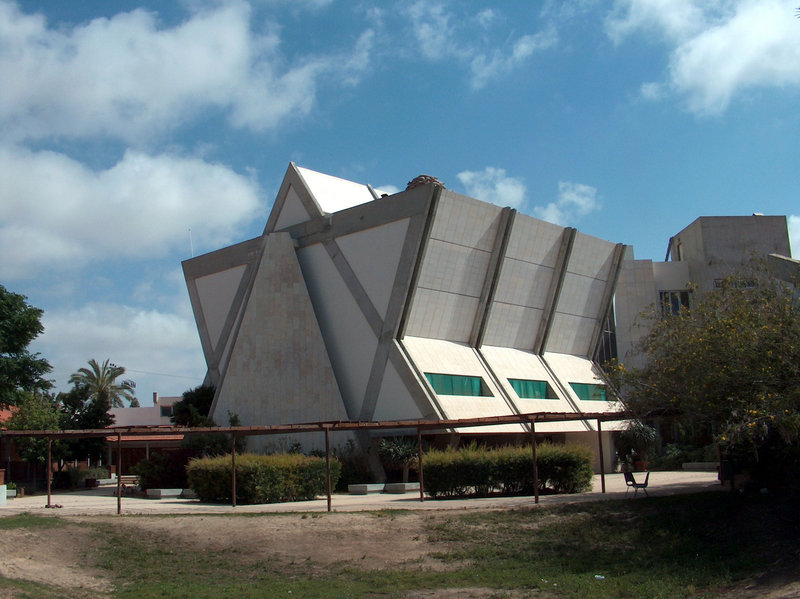
Synagogue in Neve Dekalim, 2005

The population consisted of about 520 families (2,600 people), mainly Orthodox Jews. It was the largest Israeli settlement in the Gaza Strip and a commercial centre for the region. The industrial zone of Gush Katif was located in Neve Dekalim.

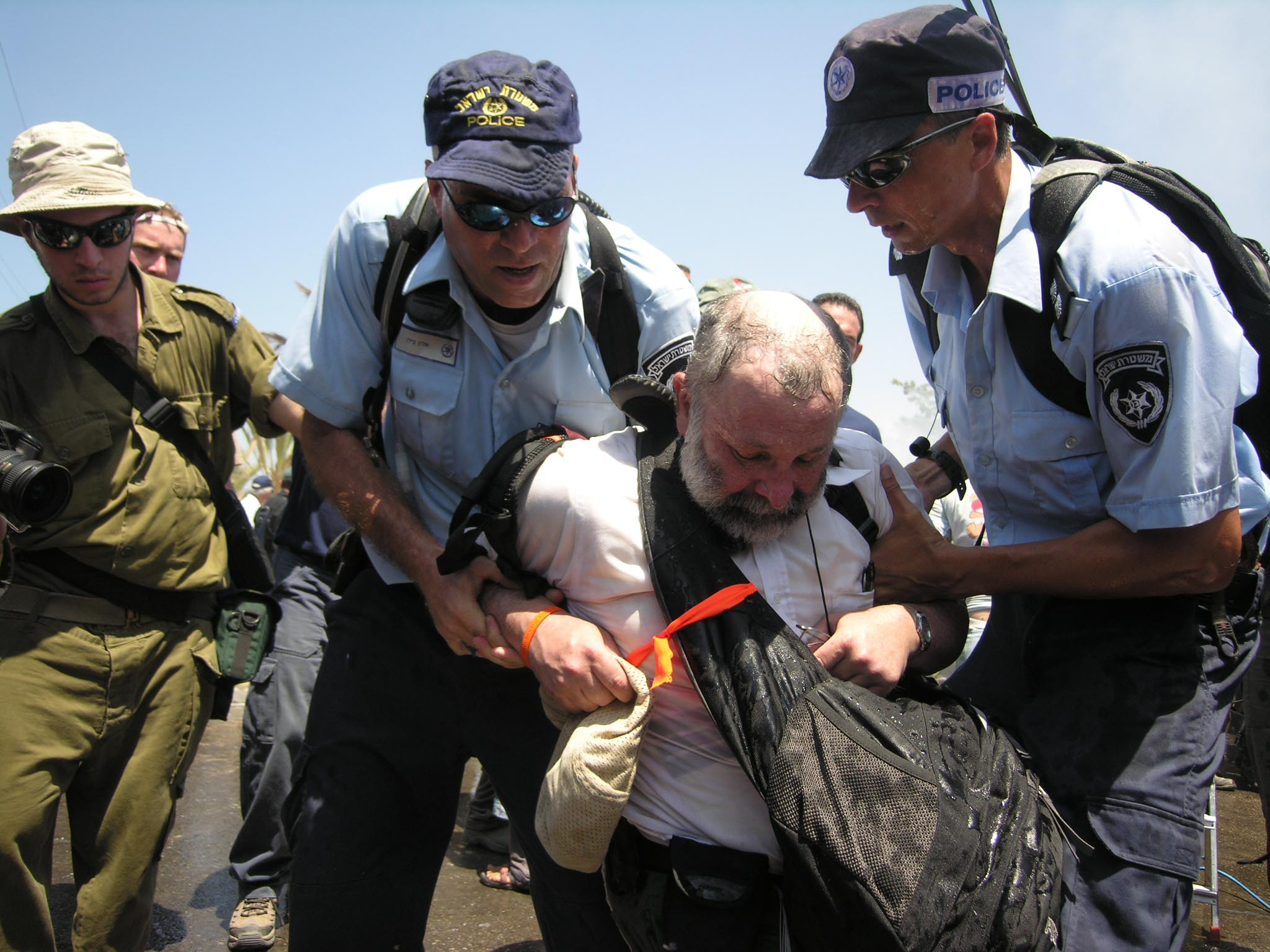
Israeli authorities forcibly evicting Neve Dekalim residents as part of Israel's disengagement from the Gaza Strip, 2005

During the Second Intifada, some 6,000 mortars and Qassam rockets were fired at Neve Dekalim by Palestinian militants. In July 2005, shortly before the Israeli disengagement plan was implemented, two Neve Daklim residents were injured by Palestinian mortar strikes.

== Dismantling ==
The evacuation of Neve Dekalim began on 15 August, as part of the Israeli disengagement plan, and was completed on 18 August. The residents were given 48 hours to leave. Those who refused to leave voluntarily barricaded themselves in the settlement's synagogue, but were forcibly removed by the Israel Defense Forces and the Israel Police.

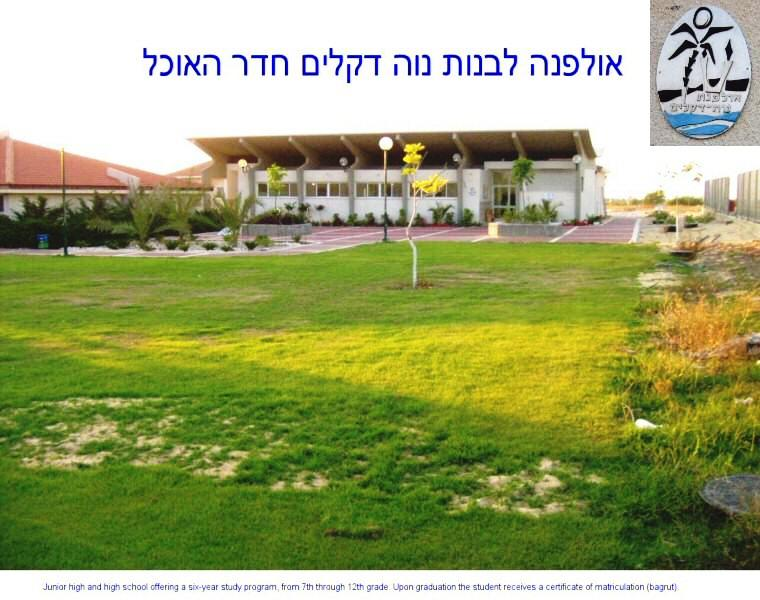
Girls' school in Neve Dekalim, 2005

The homes were bulldozed by Israel after the residents were evacuated, leaving only the greenhouses, which were part of a transaction in which private American citizens bought them for the Palestinians. Despite the presence of Palestinian security guards, dozens of these greenhouses were looted by local looters.

Marching through the abandoned town in a "victory parade," Hamas gunmen fired in the air and trampled an Israeli flag.

It was the largest Israeli settlement in the Gaza Strip. Signs posted in Arabic state that it is a "closed military zone."

In 2010, the site of Neve Dekalim was mostly sand and rubble, with Palestinian trucks removing the last remnants of Israeli homes for use as construction material. In Israel, former residents of the settlement established a new village, Bnei Dekalim.

== In popular culture ==
Neve Dekalim is featured in the movie Disengagement by Amos Gitai. Grains Of Sand: The Fall Of Neve Dekalim by Shifra Shomron, a former resident of Neve Dekalim, is a semi-autobiographical novel about an Israeli family evacuated from Gush Katif.
