= Shikhin =

- שִׁיחִין (Hebrew)
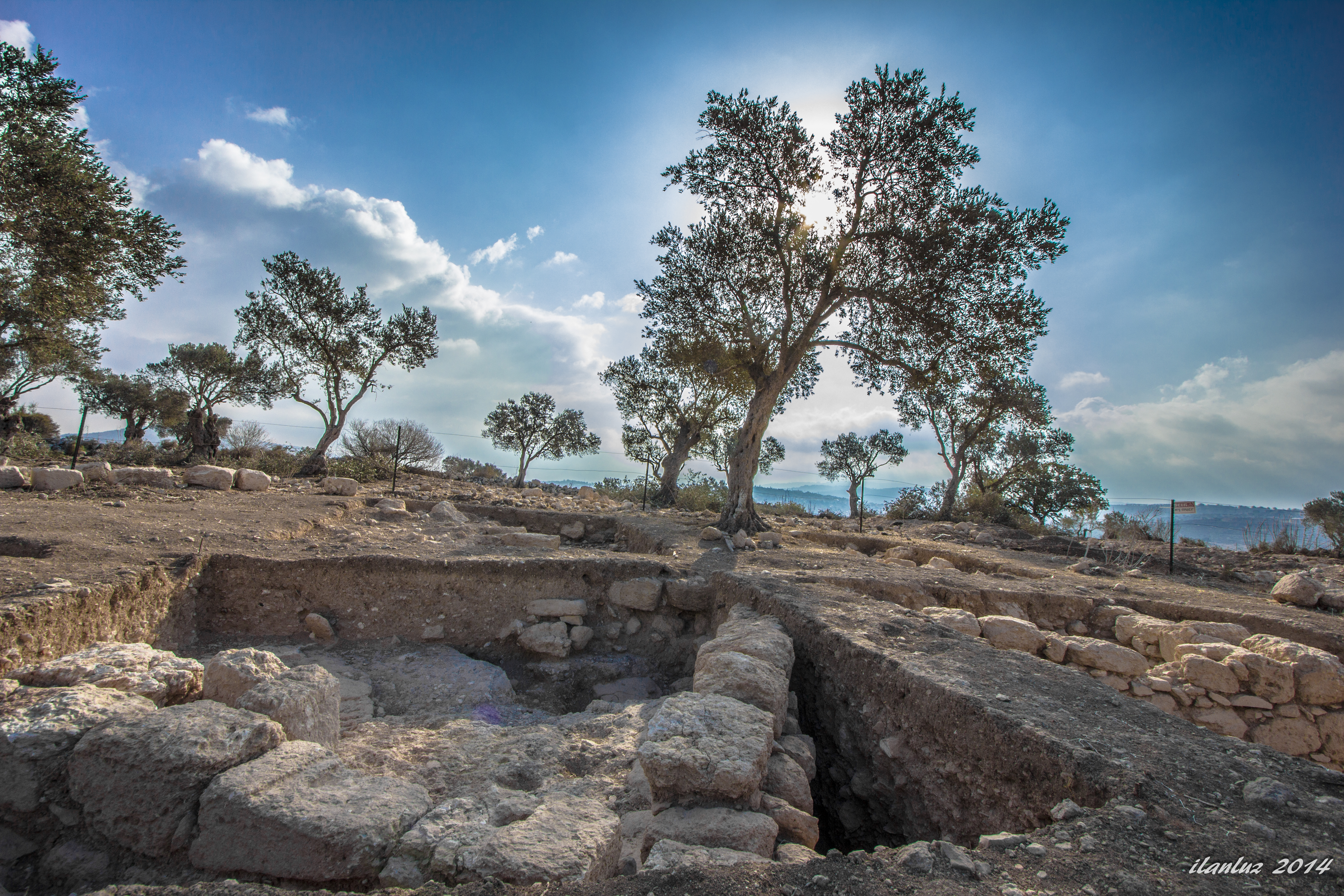
- Excavations in Shikhin

- Location within Israel
- 32°46′08″N 35°16′23.9″E
- Type: In ruins
- Periods: Roman Period
- Cultures: Jewish
- Location: Hoshaya, Israel
- Region: Galilee

Shikhin (Hebrew: שִׁיחִין, variant spelling שׁוּחִין), known in Greek as Asochis, was an ancient Jewish village in Galilee which was abandoned in the fourth century CE. It was situated right next to the regional capital, Sepphoris, and its ruins have been discovered about 8 kilometres (5.0 mi) northwest of Nazareth. As of May 2012, the site is under excavation. So far, evidence of extensive pottery work and a synagogue have been uncovered.

== Location ==
Shikhin is located in central Galilee next to the ancient city of Sepphoris, near the modern-day Moshav Tzippori, within Zippori National Park and about 5 miles (8.0 km) northwest of Nazareth.

== History ==
First-century historian Josephus refers to Shikhin as Asochis (Greek: Ἀσωχίς). He described the village as one of the first Jewish settlements formed in Galilee. He dated it to the Hasmonaean Dynasty (140-63 BCE). The Talmud describes the village as being home to many potters. The village was abandoned in the fourth century CE when the buildings were dismantled and the stones reused elsewhere. The Plain of Asochis lay nearby, identified today as Beit Netofa Valley (Sahel el-Buttauf in Arabic), an area south of Kfar Manda, but due north of Sepphoris.

The Jerusalem Talmud, when making note of the former wealth of the village, writes:

There were three cities whose tax ledgers were carried by wagon unto Jerusalem: Cabul, Asochis, and Migdal of the dyers, and all three of them were destroyed. Cabul because of a schism, Asochis because of sorcery, and Migdal of the dyers because of lechery.

== Significance ==
=== Origin of ancient Galileans ===
Josephus mentions in the same context Shikhin and nearby Sepphoris. In 2013, Aviam noted that Shikhin is one of the two earliest Galilean settlement names attested from the Second Temple period, and he expressed the hope that the digs will help clarify the unsolved question regarding the identity of the Galileans. After the Assyrian destruction of Israel in the 8th century BCE, there is hardly any historical evidence concerning the history and population of the Galilee, until the second century BCE redevelopment of the region under the Hasmoneans. The Galileans of the Hellenistic period might have been remnants from the First Temple period, immigrants from Judea, or converts to Judaism.

=== Time of Talmud and early Christianity ===
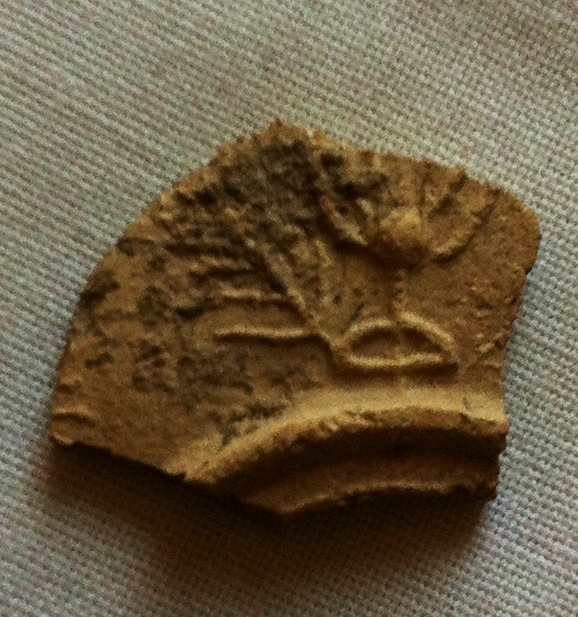
An oil lamp fragment found at Shikhin, decorated with menorah and lulav

Strange said he believes the site will further lend understanding of Galilean Jewish village life and the economy during the period of time when the Talmud was written and Christianity was establishing itself.

=== Pottery production centre ===
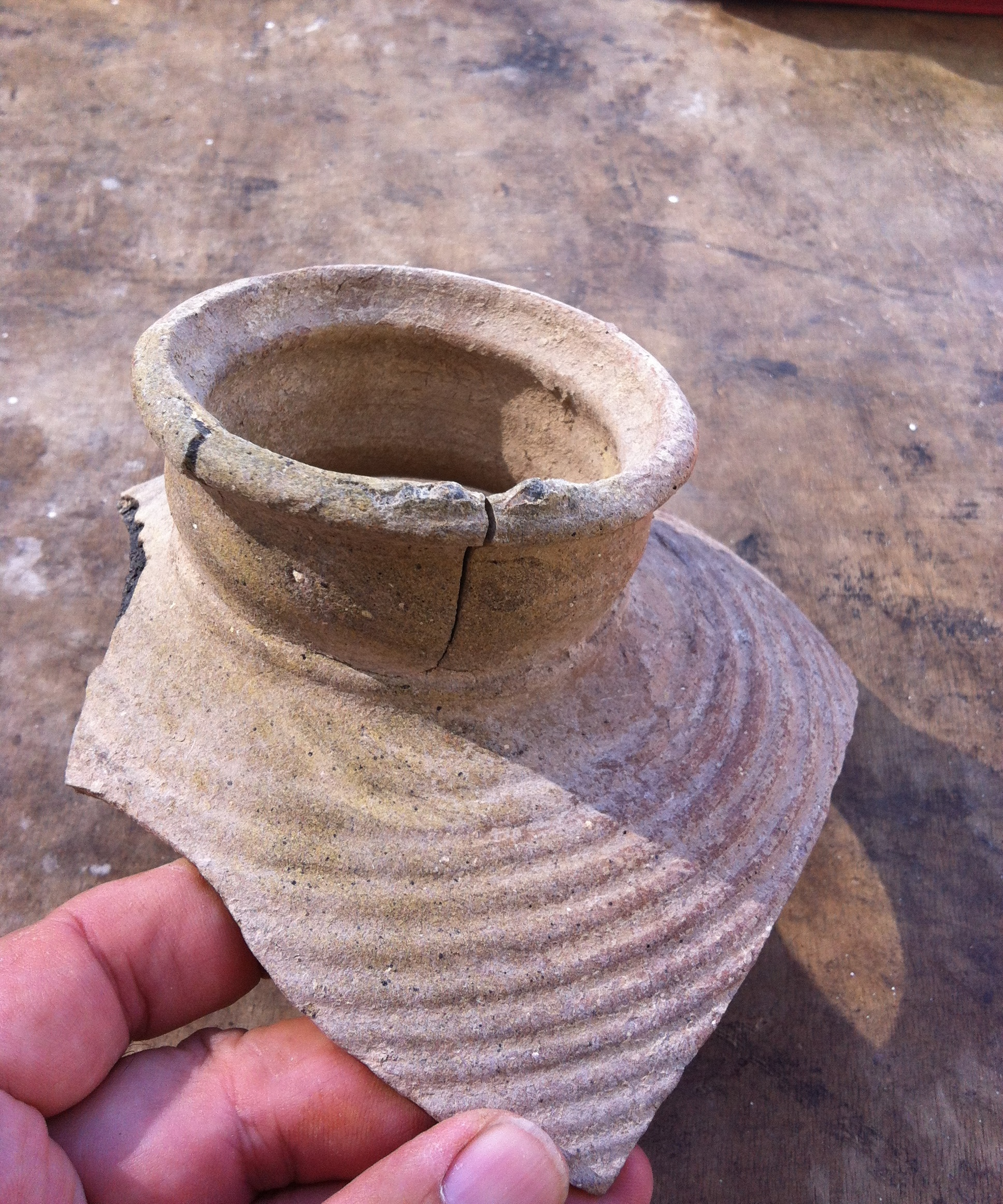
Shikhin jug that was damaged in a furnace

Being a village located in close proximity to a large city - Sepphoris, capital of Galilee - and given that both ancient sources and archaeological finds attest to Shikhin's importance as a major centre for pottery production, the archaeologists hope to learn about the "relationship and the sociological connection" between village and city.

Seven molds used to make oil lamps, the most ever found in a village in Israel, were recovered from the site. According to Aviam, this is strong evidence that "the production of oil lamps was very important" to Shikhin.

Shikhin was a major pottery production centre in Roman Galilee, specialized in jars, flasks (Note: small or medium-sized narrow-necked containers used for oil, wine, etc) and kraters, although it seems that no cooking ware was produced there, unlike in Kefar Hanania, the leading regional production centre during the entire Roman period. At the end of that period and the transition to the Early Byzantine period, material culture changed substantially and, in the mid-fourth century, wares from both centres suffer a pronounced decline. In tannaitic and amoraic and literature, written in the first five centuries CE, Kefar Hananya and Kefar Shikhin still are used as archetypal places where pottery was made with "black clay" (Bava Metzia 6, 3).

== History of archaeological research ==
An archaeological survey of an area less than 1.5 km north of Sepphoris, that led to the identification of Shikhin, took place in 1988, and a second one was undertaken in 2011. In 2012, excavation got underway led by James Riley Strange of Samford University, Mordechai Aviam of Kinneret College and David Fiensy of Kentucky Christian University.

== Archaeological findings ==
The village expanded over three low hilltops, with a general north-south orientation and over a distance of little over one kilometre. The hill of Jebel Qat lays outside and to the east of the village, and there archaeologists found a cave used as hideaway, signs of quarrying, and of olive and/or wine industry.

In August 2013, the team announced that it had uncovered evidence of an ancient synagogue and houses. They also found evidence of pottery production in the area.

Three sarcophagi, largely unadorned except for some non-figurative stone relief, have been uncovered on neighbouring Jebel Qat, near one of a number tombs discovered around the village.

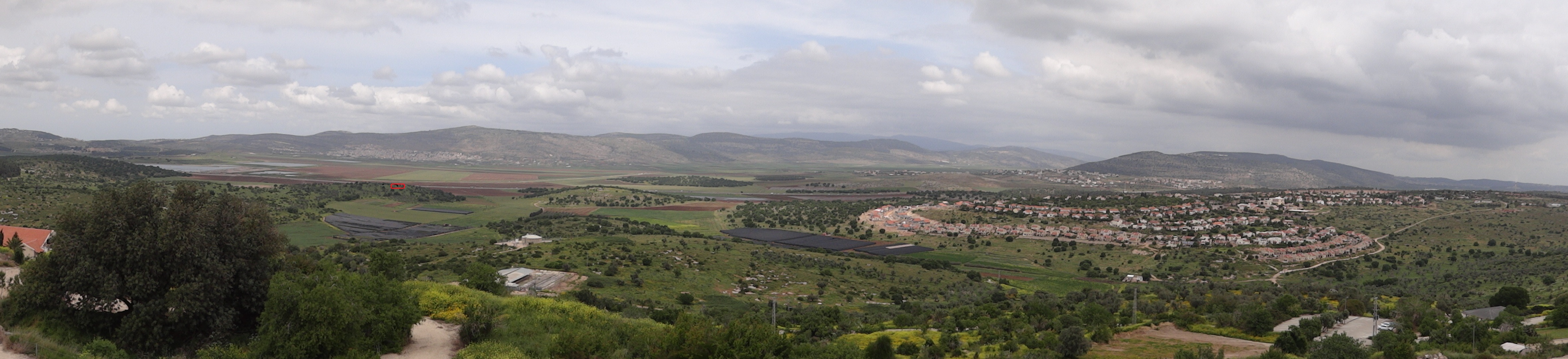
View from Tzippori of Beit Netofa Valley. Shikhin is located along the left-hand edge of the photographs is highlighted in red. On the right hand side of the picture is Hoshaya.

== See also ==
- Kefar Hanania, village where most of Galilee's cooking ware was produced between 1st century BCE – 5th century CE

== Bibliography ==
- Leibner, Uzi (2009). Settlement and History in Hellenistic, Roman, and Byzantine Galilee. Texts and Studies in Ancient Judaism. Vol. 127. Tübingen: Mohr Siebeck. pp. 8, 49, 132. ISBN 978-3-16-149871-8.
