= Nazareth Subdistrict, Mandatory Palestine =

Administrative division of British Palestine (1920–1948)

Nazareth Subdistrict قضاء الناصرة נפת נצרת
- Subdistrict of Mandatory Palestine
- 1920–1948
- Capital: Nazareth
- Demonym: nasrawi (male) nasrawiyah (female) (ar)
- Area
  - 1945: 497.5 km^{2} (192.1 sq mi)
- Population
  - 1931: 28,592
  - 1945: 46,100
- History
  - Established: 1920
  - Disestablished: 1948
| Preceded by | Succeeded by |
| Acre Sanjak | Jezreel Subdistrict |
- Today part of: Israel

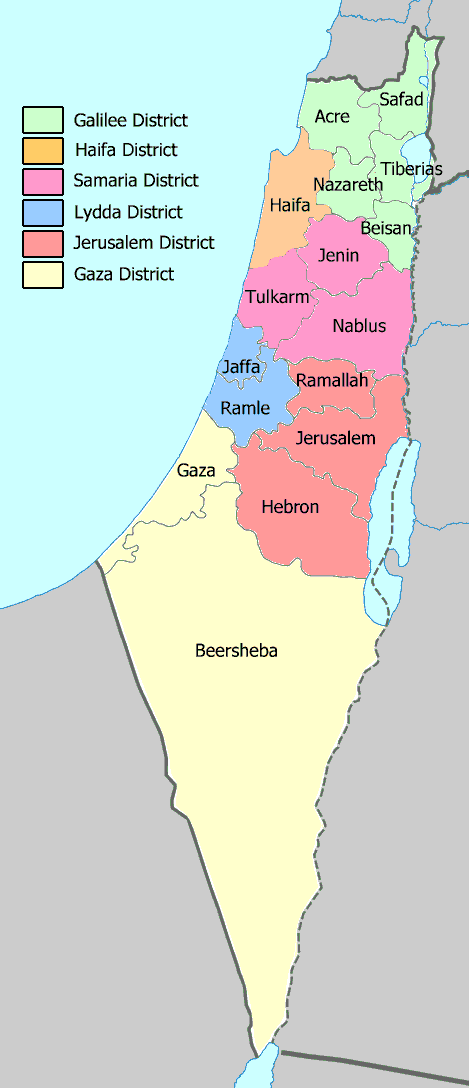
Subdistricts grouped by districts in 1945. Galilee District with Nazareth Subdistrict in green.

The Nazareth Subdistrict was one of the subdistricts of Mandatory Palestine. It was located around the city of Nazareth. After the 1948 Arab-Israeli War, the district disintegrated; having fallen entirely within modern-day Israel, it was merged with the Beisan Subdistrict into the Jezreel Subdistrict.

== Towns and villages ==
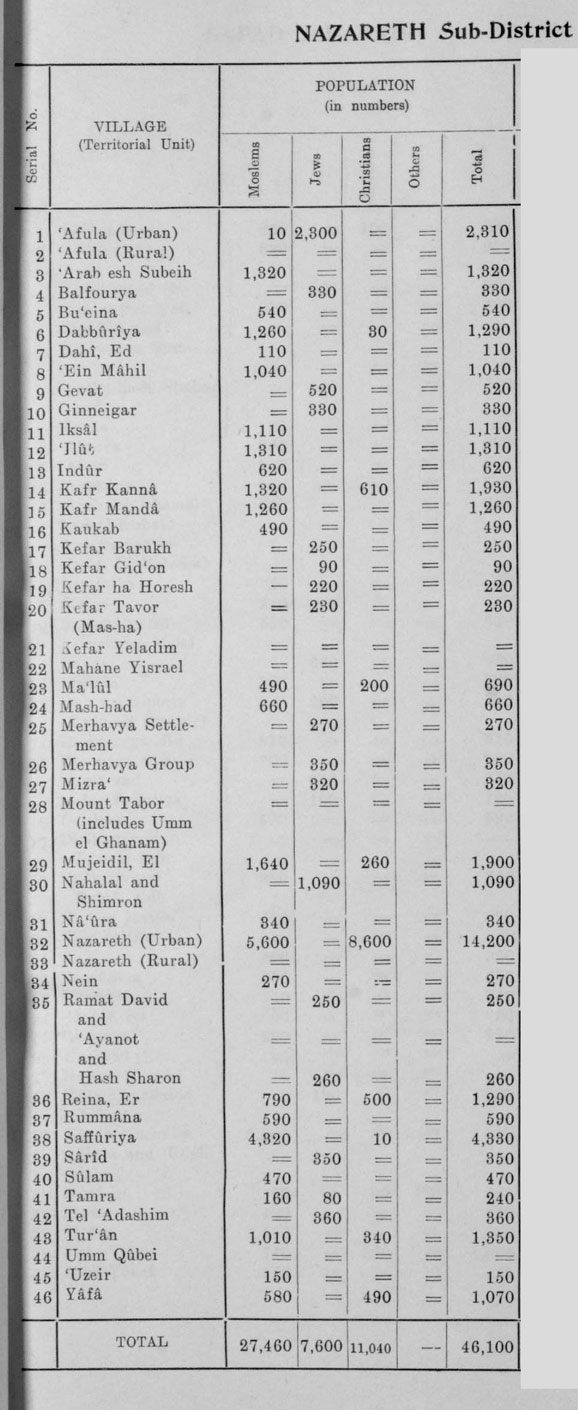
Official population statistics for the sub-district, from Village Statistics, 1945.

(current localities in parentheses)

Nazareth Sub-District – Population by Village
| Village | Muslims | Jews | Christians | Others | Total |
|---|---|---|---|---|---|
| 'Afula (Urban) | 10 | 2,300 | | | 2,310 |
| 'Afula (Rural) | | | | | |
| 'Arah es Subeih | 1,320 | | | | 1,320 |
| Balfourya | | 330 | | | 330 |
| Bu'eina | 540 | | | | 540 |
| Daburiyya | 1,260 | | 30 | | 1,290 |
| Dahi (Ed) | 110 | | | | 110 |
| 'Ein Mahil | 1,040 | | | | 1,040 |
| Gevat | | 520 | | | 520 |
| Ginneigar | | 330 | | | 330 |
| Iksal | 1,110 | | | | 1,110 |
| Ijzim | 1,310 | | | | 1,310 |
| Indur | 620 | | | | 620 |
| Kafr Kanna | 1,320 | | 610 | | 1,930 |
| Kafr Manda | 1,260 | | | | 1,260 |
| Kaukab | 490 | | | | 490 |
| Kefar Barukh | | 250 | | | 250 |
| Kefar Gid‘on | | 90 | | | 90 |
| Kefar ha Horesh | | 220 | | | 220 |
| Kefar Tavor (Mash-ha) | | 230 | | | 230 |
| Kefar Yeladim | | | | | |
| Mahane Yisrael | | | | | |
| Ma‘lul | 490 | | 200 | | 690 |
| Mash-had | 660 | | | | 660 |
| Merhavia Settlement | | 270 | | | 270 |
| Merhavia Group | | 350 | | | 350 |
| Mizra‘ | | 320 | | | 320 |
| Mount Tabor (includes Umm el Ghanam) | | | | | |
| Mujeidil (El) | 1,640 | | 260 | | 1,900 |
| Nahalal and Shimron | | 1,090 | | | 1,090 |
| Na‘ura | 340 | | | | 340 |
| Nazareth (Urban) | 5,600 | | 8,600 | | 14,200 |
| Nazareth (Rural) | | | | | |
| Nein | 270 | | | | 270 |
| Ramat David | | 250 | | | 250 |
| 'Ayanot | | | | | |
| Hash Sharon | | 260 | | | 260 |
| Reina (Er) | 790 | | 500 | | 1,290 |
| Rummana | 590 | | | | 590 |
| Saffuriya | 4,320 | | 10 | | 4,330 |
| Sarid | | 350 | | | 350 |
| Sulam | 470 | | | | 470 |
| Tamra | 160 | 80 | | | 240 |
| Tel ‘Adashim | | 360 | | | 360 |
| Tur‘an | 1,010 | | 340 | | 1,350 |
| Umm Qubei | | | | | |
| ‘Uzeir | 150 | | | | 150 |
| Yafa | 580 | | 490 | | 1,070 |
| TOTAL | 27,460 | 7,600 | 11,040 | — | 46,100 |

=== Depopulated towns and villages ===
- al-Mujaydil (Migdal HaEmek, Yifat)
- Indur
- Ma'alul (Kfar HaHoresh, Migdal HaEmek, Timrat)
- Saffuriyya (HaSolelim, Heftziba, Sde Nahum, Tzippori)
