= Al-Burini =

Syrian historian, poet and Shafi'i jurist (1556-1615)

- Born: July 1556; Saffuriya, near Nazareth, Galilee
- Died: June 11, 1615 (aged 58); Damascus
- Occupations: Historian, Poet, Shafi'i Jurist
- Notable work: Tarajim al-A'yan min Abna al-Zaman, al-Rihlat al-Tarabulusiyya, al-Rihlat al-Halabiyya

Badr al-Din al-Hasan ibn Muhammad al-Dimashqi al-Saffuri al-Burini (July 1556-11 June 1615), commonly known as al-Hasan al-Burini, was a Damascus-based Ottoman Arab historian and poet and Shafi'i jurist.

== Life ==
Al-Burini was born in mid-July 1556 in the village of Saffuriya near Nazareth in the Galilee, hence his nisba (epithet) "al-Saffuri". His father Muhammad was originally from the village of Burin near Nablus hence the nisba "al-Burini". At the age of 10 he moved to Damascus with his father.

Al-Burini learned the Qur'an at the Manjak Mosque in the Midan neighborhood in his adolescence. Afterward, he received an education in Arabic grammar, qanun (secular law) and arithmetic from Damascene ulema (religious scholars) at the Madrasa al-Umariyya in the Salihiyya neighborhood. His studies there were interrupted by a famine, which prompted him to relocate to Jerusalem from 1567 to 1571. In Jerusalem he was taught by Muhammad ibn Abi al-Lutf. He moved back to Damascus in 1571, settling in the Sufi lodge of Samisatiyya where he expanded his education to literature, fiqh (jurisprudence), tafsir (Qur'anic interpretations), and hadith. By 1580 he had mastered Persian, as taught to him by Persian author Hafiz Husayn al-Karbala'i (d. 1588) in Aleppo or Damascus. Later in life, he also learned Turkish.

After completing his studies, al-Burini became the head of the Shafi'i fiqh in the Umayyad Mosque in 1580. About the same time he began making sermons at the Sultan Mosque and became a lecturer in a number of Damascus madrasas. He was known by his students for his eloquence, charisma and literary knowledge, while the historians and religious scholars of the period lauded al-Burini for the same qualities, as well as his interest in history and philology. The governors and judges of Damascus trusted and appreciated al-Burini, considering him an accomplished Shafi’i jurist with independent judgements. He served as the kadi (Islamic head judge) of the Ottoman Hajj pilgrimage caravan from Damascus to Mecca in 1611. On 11 June 1615 he died in Damascus and was buried in the cemetery of Bab al-Faradis.

== Literary works ==
One of al-Burini's main bodies of work was Tarajim al-A'yan min Abna al-Zaman, a collection of 205 biographies of notable contemporary scholars, rulers and artisans, completed in 1614 after ten years. Fadl Allah ibn Muhibb Allah edited and published the work in 1667 with a supplement. The work was republished in Damascus in 1959.

Al-Burini often traveled to different parts of Syria, penning two works about his trips to Tripoli in 1599/1600 and Aleppo in al-Rihlat al-Tarabulusiyya and al-Rihlat al-Halabiyya, respectively. During his visits to Tripoli and its Akkar countryside he was hosted by the chieftain and governor Yusuf Sayfa Pasha.

His poetry is mostly found in a diwan located in Istanbul. His epistle to As'ad ibn Muiin al-Din al-Tibrizi al-Dimashqi is located in Gotha, his Marathi poems for the Sufi Muhammad ibn Abi'l-Barakat al-Qadiri is preserved in Berlin and number of his poems are held in the British Museum in London.

He penned a commentary on the diwan of Ibn al-Farid in 1591 and a commentary on the latter's al-Ta’iyya al-Sughra in 1593.

== Bibliography ==
- Abu-Husayn, Abdul-Rahim (1985). Provincial Leaderships in Syria, 1575-1650. Beirut: American University of Beirut. ISBN 9780815660729.
- Brockelmann, C. (1960). "Al-Burini". In Gibb, H. A. R.; Kramers, J. H.; Lévi-Provençal, E.; Schacht, J.; Lewis, B. & Pellat, Ch. (eds.). The Encyclopaedia of Islam, Second Edition. Volume I: A–B. Leiden: E. J. Brill. p. 1333. OCLC 495469456.
- Mullazadih, Muhammad Hani (2013). "Al-Burini, Hasan ibn Muhammad Dimashqi Saffuri". In Adel, G.H.; Elmi, Mohammad Jafar; Taromi-Rad, Hassan (eds.). Historians of the Islamic World: Selected Entries from Encyclopedia of the World of Islam. London: EWI Press. pp. 45–48. ISBN 978-1-908433-12-1.
