= Boaz Ellis =

Israeli foil fencer

Personal information
- Native name: בועז אליס
- Born: October 15, 1981 (age 44) Tzippori, Israel

Fencing career
- Sport: Fencing
- Country: Israel
- Weapon: foil
- Hand: left

Boaz Ellis (Hebrew: בועז אליס; born October 15, 1981) is an Israeli foil fencer. He is a 5-time Israeli national champion, and a 3-time NCAA champion.

== Biography ==
Ellis was born in Tzippori, a moshav in Israel, and is Jewish. He attended Chaklai Nahalal High School, where he competed in association football (soccer), and in track as a sprinter.

== Fencing career ==
Ellis is a 5-time Israeli national champion. He joined the Israeli national fencing team at the age of 16. Ellis won the silver medal at the World Cup in 2000 and 2001.

In 2003 Ellis enrolled at the Ohio State University, where he majored in finance. He began competing under head coach Vladimir Nazlymov. Ellis won his first 34 bouts, and finished with a 37–1 record.

Ellis won the NCAA 2004 championship by defeating Yale sophomore Cory Werk. Ellis' performance also helped Ohio State win the team NCAA title that year. He repeated as NCAA champion in foil in 2005, after an 18–4 season. Ellis repeated again in 2006, his junior year, after a 20–1 season. He and teammate Adam Crompton (sabre) became the first Ohio State athletes since diver Lou Vitucci to win three individual NCAA championships. He was the first NCAA foil fencer to win three individual NCAA titles since 1963. He was a three-time All-American, two-time Academic All-Big Ten, and three-time Ohio State University Scholar-Athlete.

He was inducted into the Ohio State Athletics Hall of Fame in 2014.

== See also ==
- List of select Jewish fencers
- List of NCAA fencing champions

| Preceded by Non Panchan | NCAA Foil Champion; 2004, 2005, 2006 | Succeeded by Andras Horanyi |
