= Hoshaya =

Place in Northern Israel

Hoshaya: הוֹשַׁעְיָה (Hebrew)
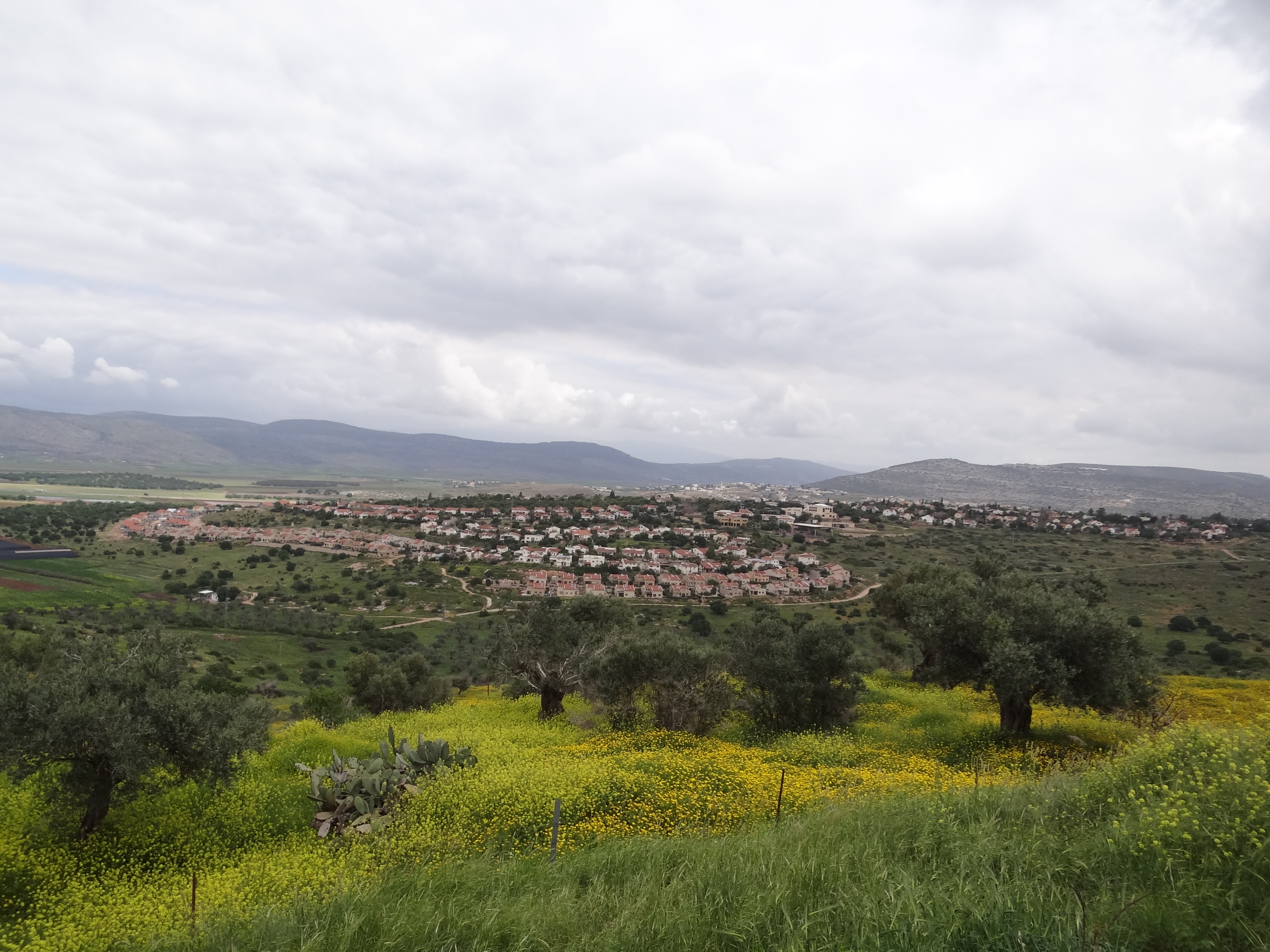

- Location within Jezreel Valley region of Israel Location within Israel
- Coordinates: 32°45′30″N 35°17′36″E
- Country: Israel
- District: Northern
- Subdistrict: Jezreel
- Council: Jezreel Valley
- Affiliation: Hapoel HaMizrachi
- Founded: 1980
- Founder: Nahal
- Population (2024): 2,014
- Website: www.hoshaya.org.il

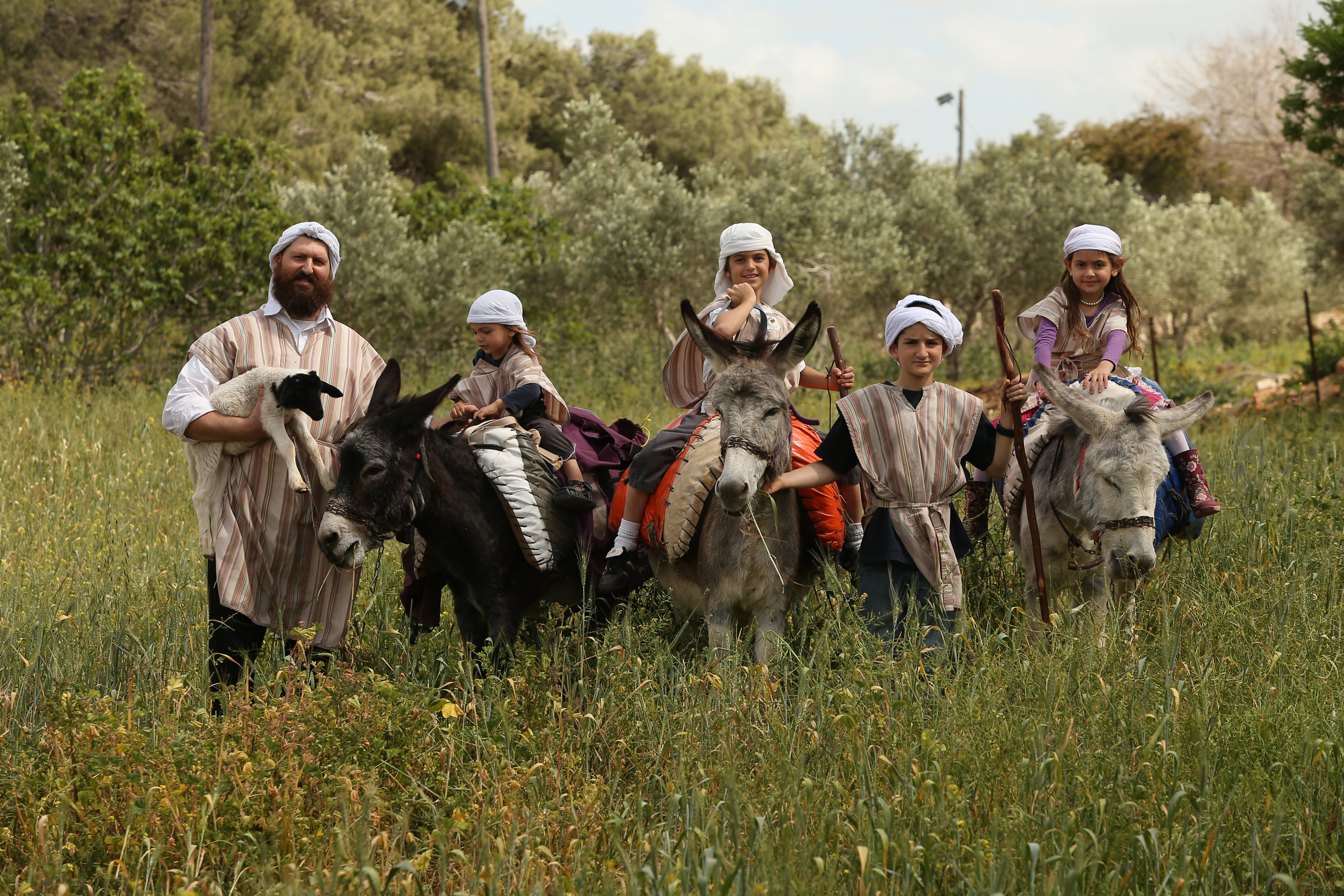
Visitors in Kfar Kedem

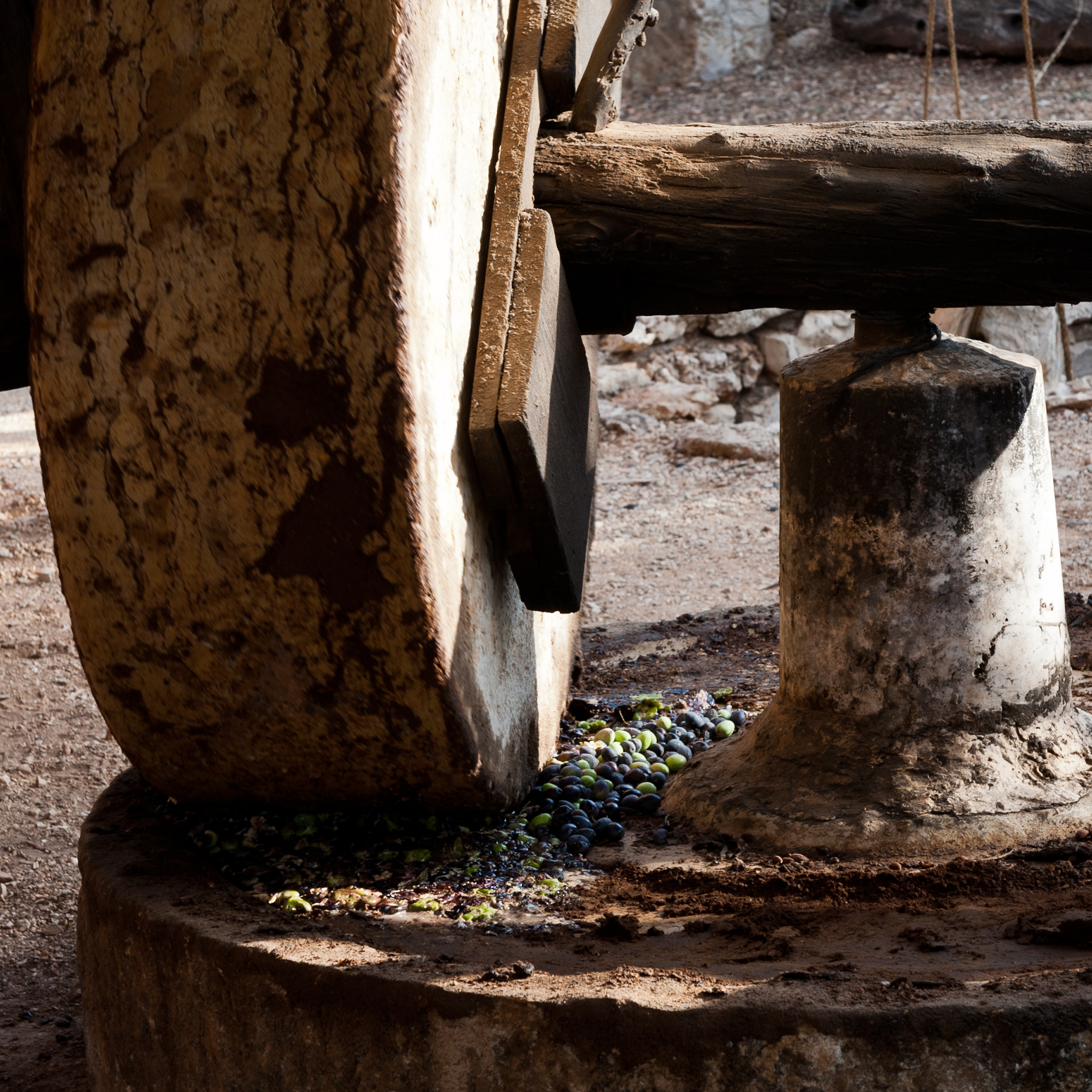
Ancient Olive Press

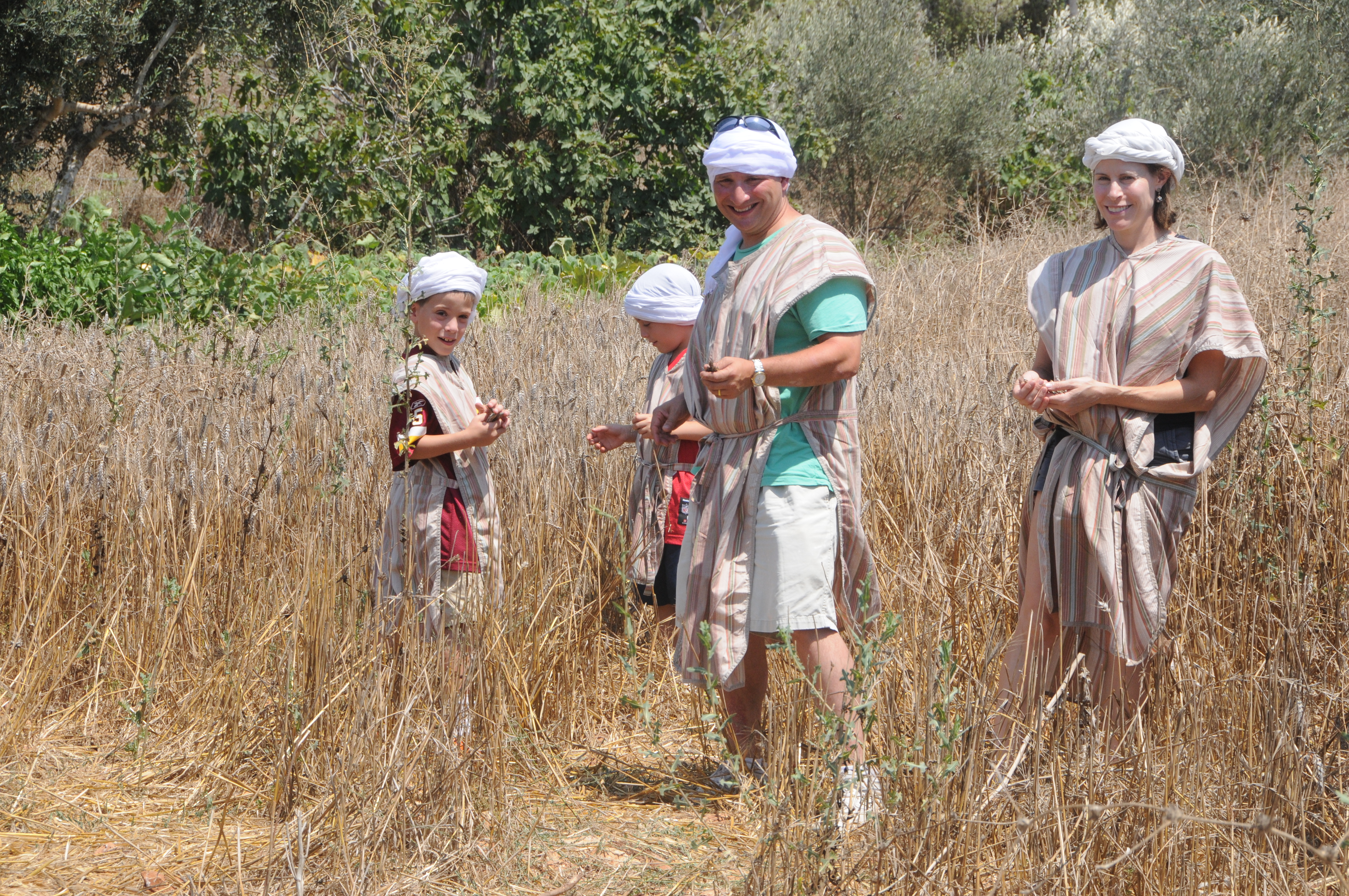
Bread Basket

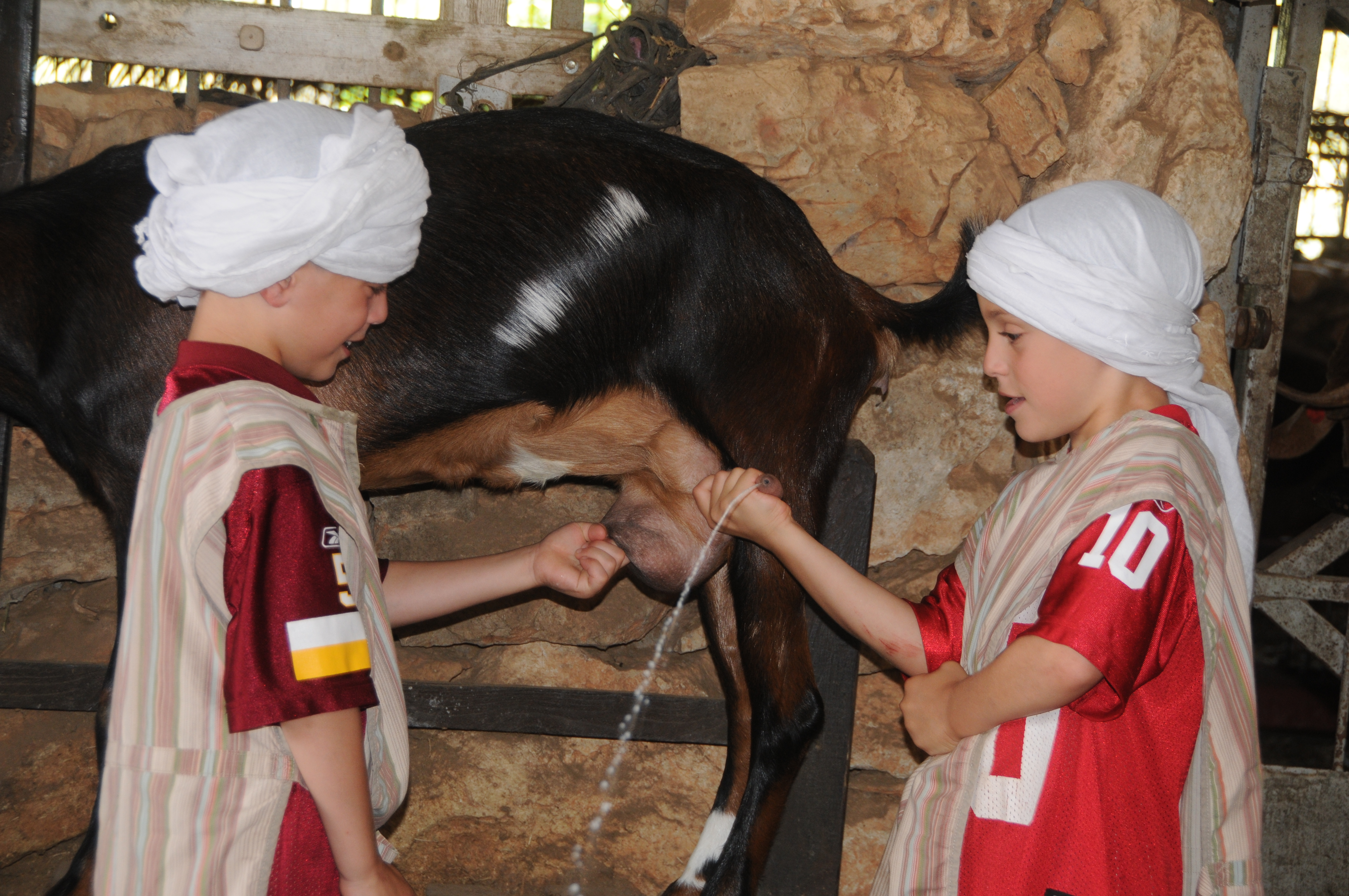
Greener Pastures

Hoshaya (Hebrew: הוֹשַׁעְיָה) is a national-religious community in northern Israel. Located to the south-east of Shefa-'Amr, on Route 77 between Hamovil Interchange and the Golani Interchange, three kilometers from the Beit Rimon Interchange, it falls under the jurisdiction of Jezreel Valley Regional Council. In 2024, it had a population of 2,014.

== Etymology ==
The village is named after Rabbi Hoshaya (or Oshaya), a scholar in the Amoraic Period of the Talmud who lived in nearby Sepphoris.

== History ==
Hoshaya was founded in 1981 on land near the former Palestinian town of Saffuriya, which was a Jewish town in classical antiquity and was later depopulated during the 1948 Arab–Israeli War. It was established as a Nahal settlement, originally planned for soldiers from moshavim in the Galilee, and later inhabited by soldiers of the religious Nahal Youth Aliyah, as part of the "Lookouts in the Galilee" plan. Three years later, it was re-purposed for a civilian population, and ten families moved into caravans on the site, with some of the original Nahal soldiers remaining.

The Hoshaya community lives according to Orthodox Judaism, with the addition of many religious activities for women: Torah reading by women for women, reading of the Scroll of Esther on Purim by women for women, reading of the Book of Ruth on Shavuot.

The founders of the village stressed volunteering and community activity. In 2000, they founded a soup kitchen to prepare and deliver meals for the needy in nearby communities.

All the streets in Hoshaya are named after the former Israeli settlements in Gush Katif: Gan Or, Morag, Shirat Hayam, Pe'at Sadeh, Dugit, Katif, Bedolah, Gadid, Ganei Tal, Elei Sinai.

As of 2024 there is an elementary school "Nativ" (with students from nearby communities, including Tefahot, Kalanit, and Kfar Hananya), Kfar Kedem, a theme park portraying an ancient Galilee village, and a boutique hotel. Maccabi and Clalit medical clinics are active in Hoshaya.

== Notable residents ==
- Elazar Stern
