= Tzippori =

Moshav in northern Israel

Tzippori: ציפורי (Hebrew)
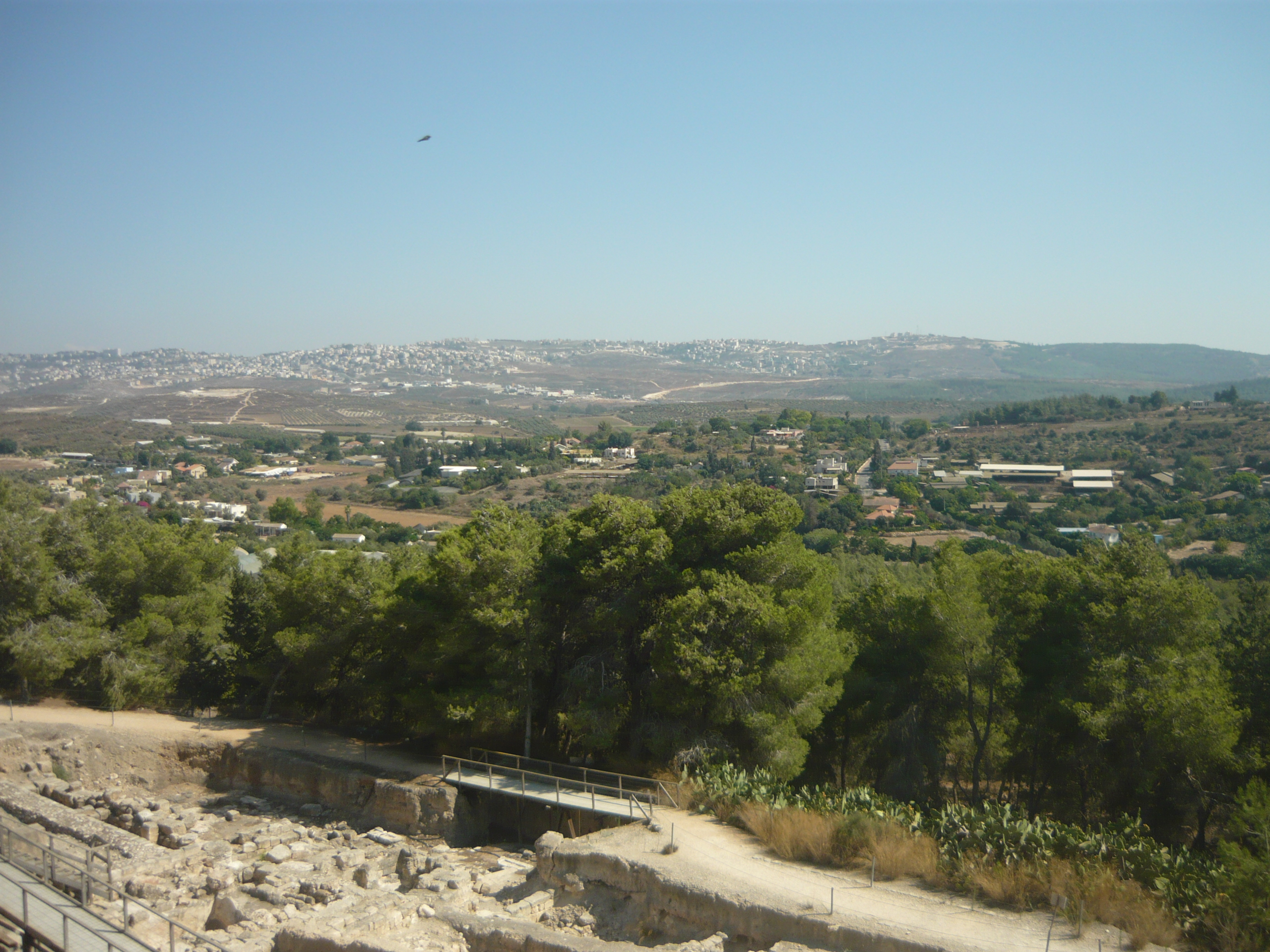

- Location within Jezreel Valley region of Israel Location within Israel
- Coordinates: 32°44′44″N 35°16′43″E
- Country: Israel
- District: Northern
- Subdistrict: Jezreel
- Council: Jezreel Valley
- Affiliation: Moshavim Movement
- Founded: 1949
- Founder: Turkish Jews
- Population (2024): 1,002

Tzippori (Hebrew: ציפורי) is a moshav in northern Israel, in the Lower Galilee. The moshav is within the jurisdiction of the Jezreel Valley Regional Council. The moshav was founded on the land of the depopulated Palestinian village of Saffuriya.

== History ==
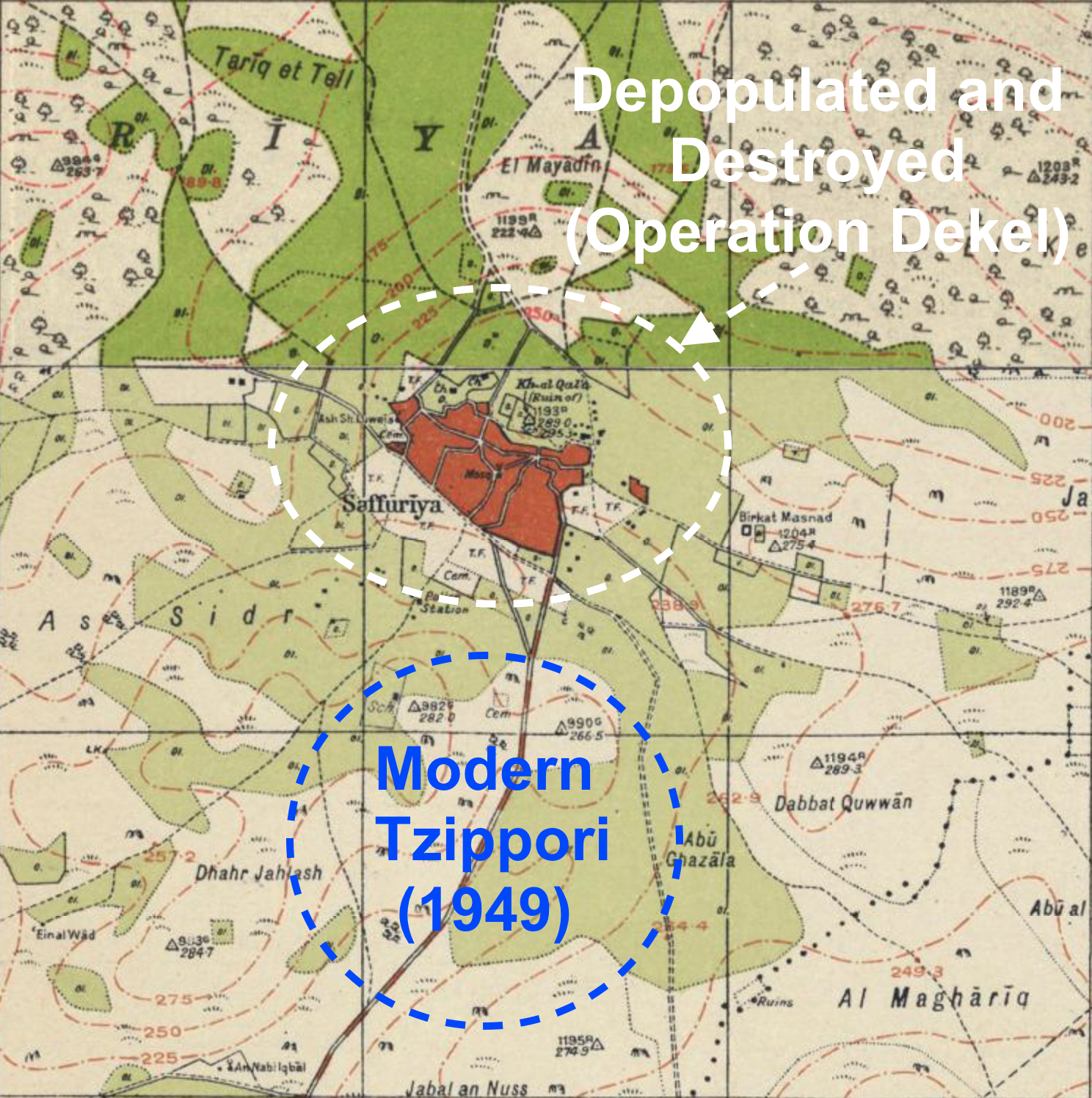
1940s Survey of Palestine map showing the location of Tzippori, on the land of the Palestinian village of Saffuriya.

The moshav was established in 1949 on land of the Palestinian village of Saffuriya, that had been depopulated during the 1948 Arab-Israeli War.. It was named after the ancient Jewish city of Sepphoris, upon whose site Saffuriya had occupied, and is now an archaeological park.

== Landmarks ==
Nahal Tzippori runs nearby. An Ottoman mill known as Monks Mill is one of eight such structures built on the riverbanks, which continued to operate until the mid 20th century.

== Notable residents ==
- Boaz Ellis, fencer
- Amir Segal, poet
