= Bnei Netzarim =

Moshav in southern Israel

Bnei Netzarim: בני נצרים (Hebrew)
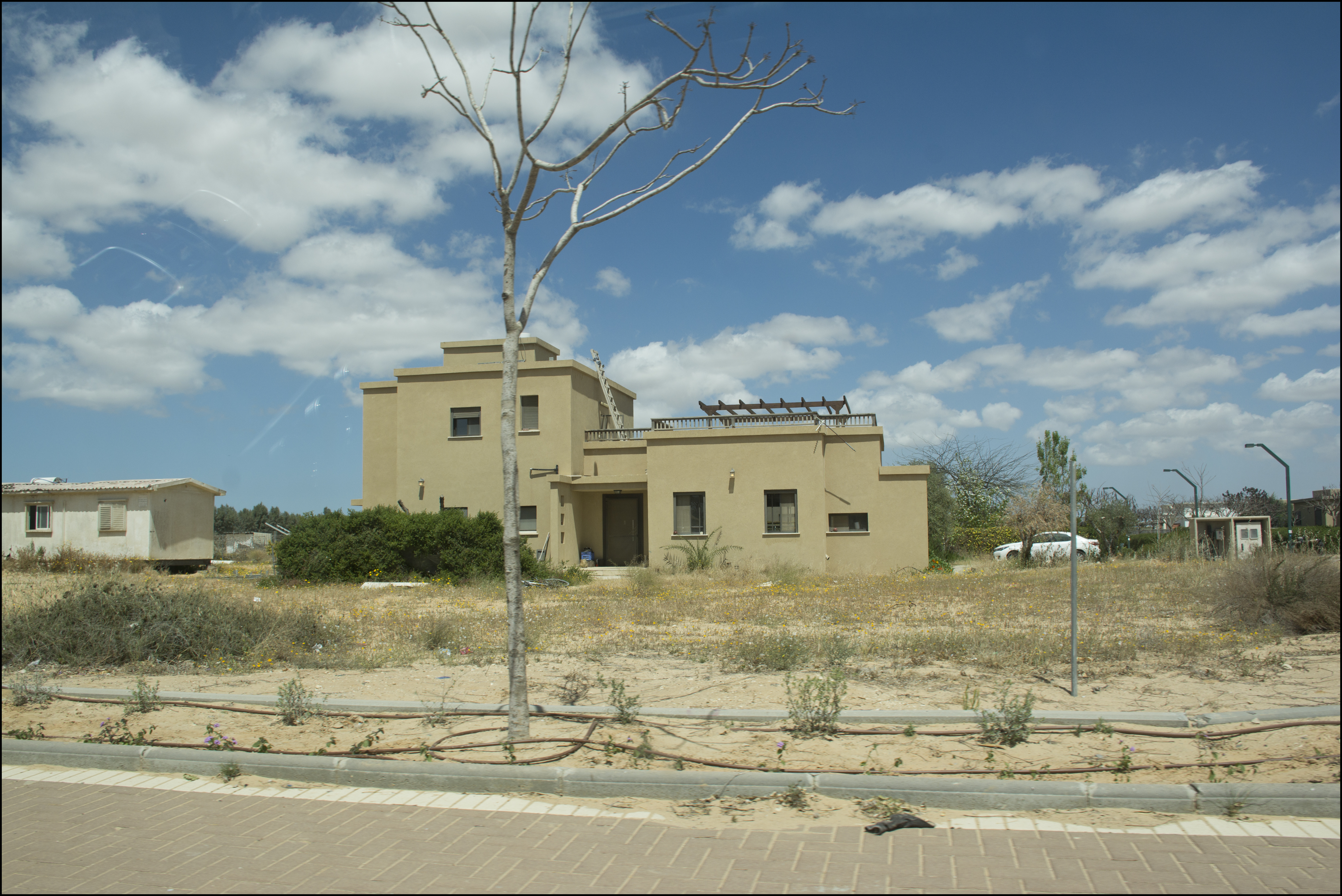
- Etymology: Sons of Netzarim
- Location within Northern Negev region of Israel Location within Israel
- Coordinates: 31°8′37″N 34°18′59″E
- Country: Israel
- District: Southern
- Subdistrict: Beersheba
- Council: Eshkol
- Affiliation: Amana
- Founded: 2010
- Founder: Gush Katif evacuees
- Population (2024): 1,152

Bnei Netzarim (Hebrew: בני נצרים, lit. 'Sons of Netzarim') is a moshav in southern Israel. Located in the Negev desert, near the Egyptian border, it falls under the jurisdiction of Eshkol Regional Council. In 2024 it had a population of 1,152.

== History ==
Bnei Netzarim was founded by settlers from Israeli settlements in the Gaza Strip removed during Israel's 2005 disengagement plan, primarily Netzarim. Some of Netzarim's residents were settled in Yevul following the disengagement and decided to found a new village in the same region.

The first residents started home construction in 2008, and the moshav was officially founded and recognized in 2010.

== Gallery ==
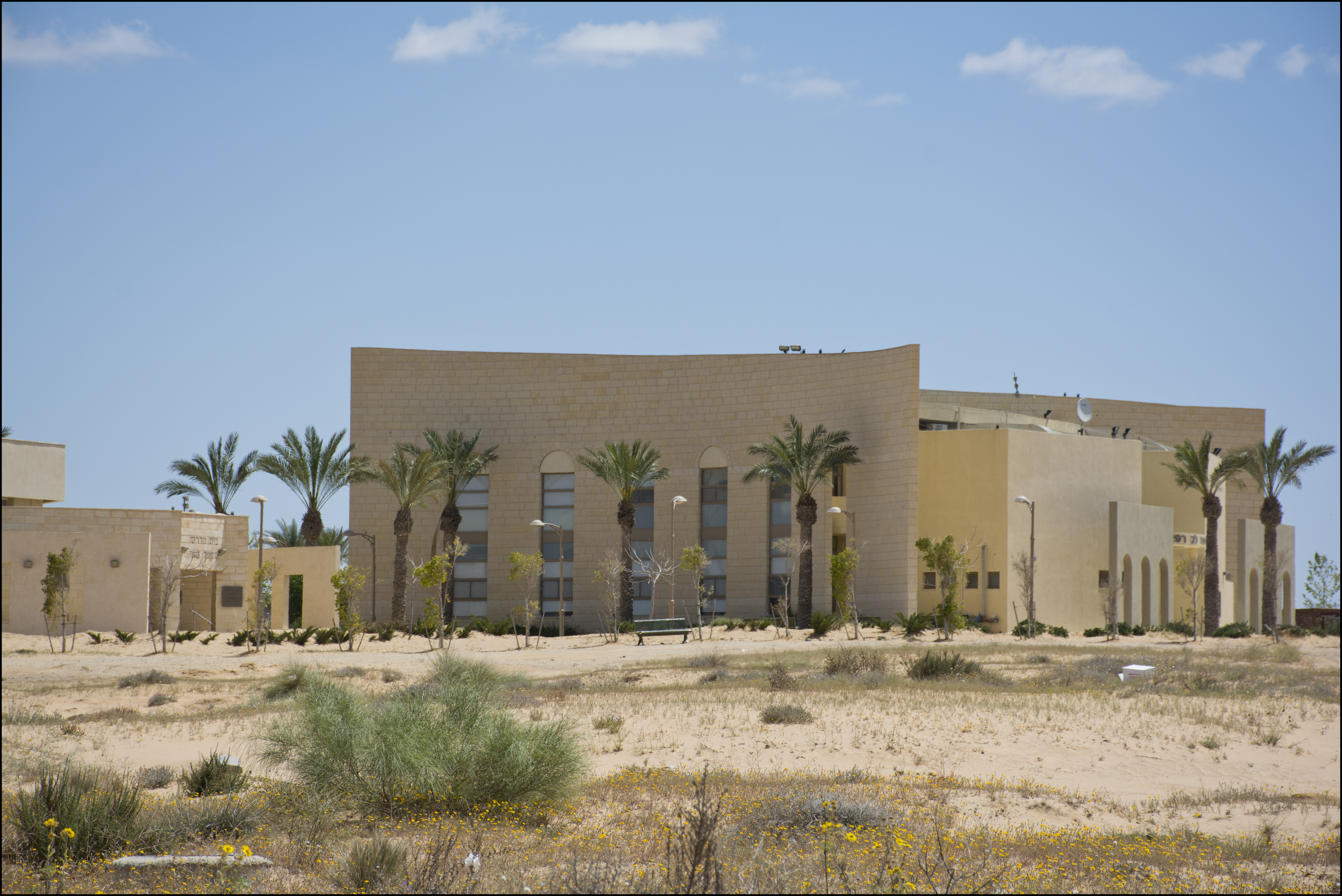
Main synagogue

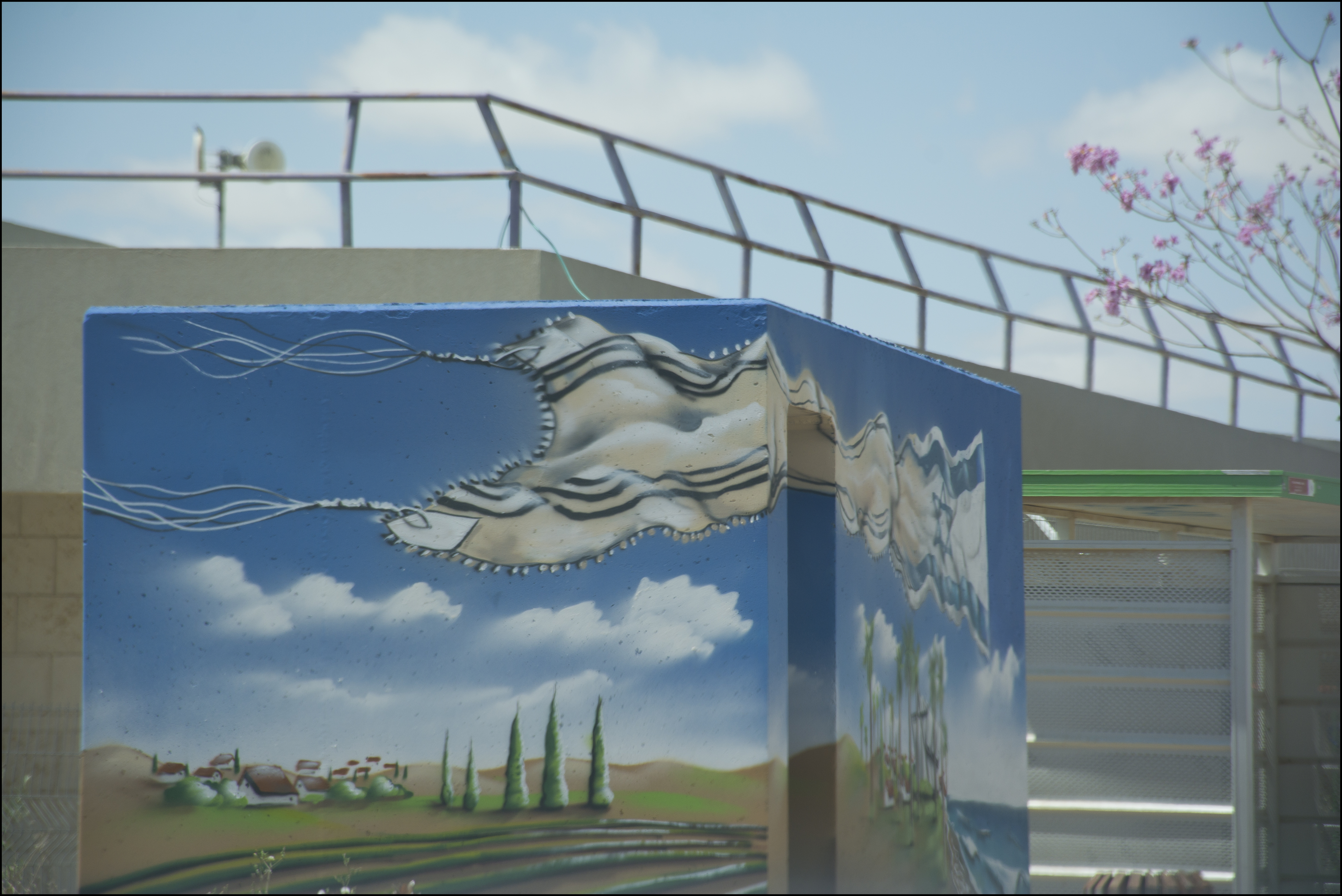
Decorated bomb shelter

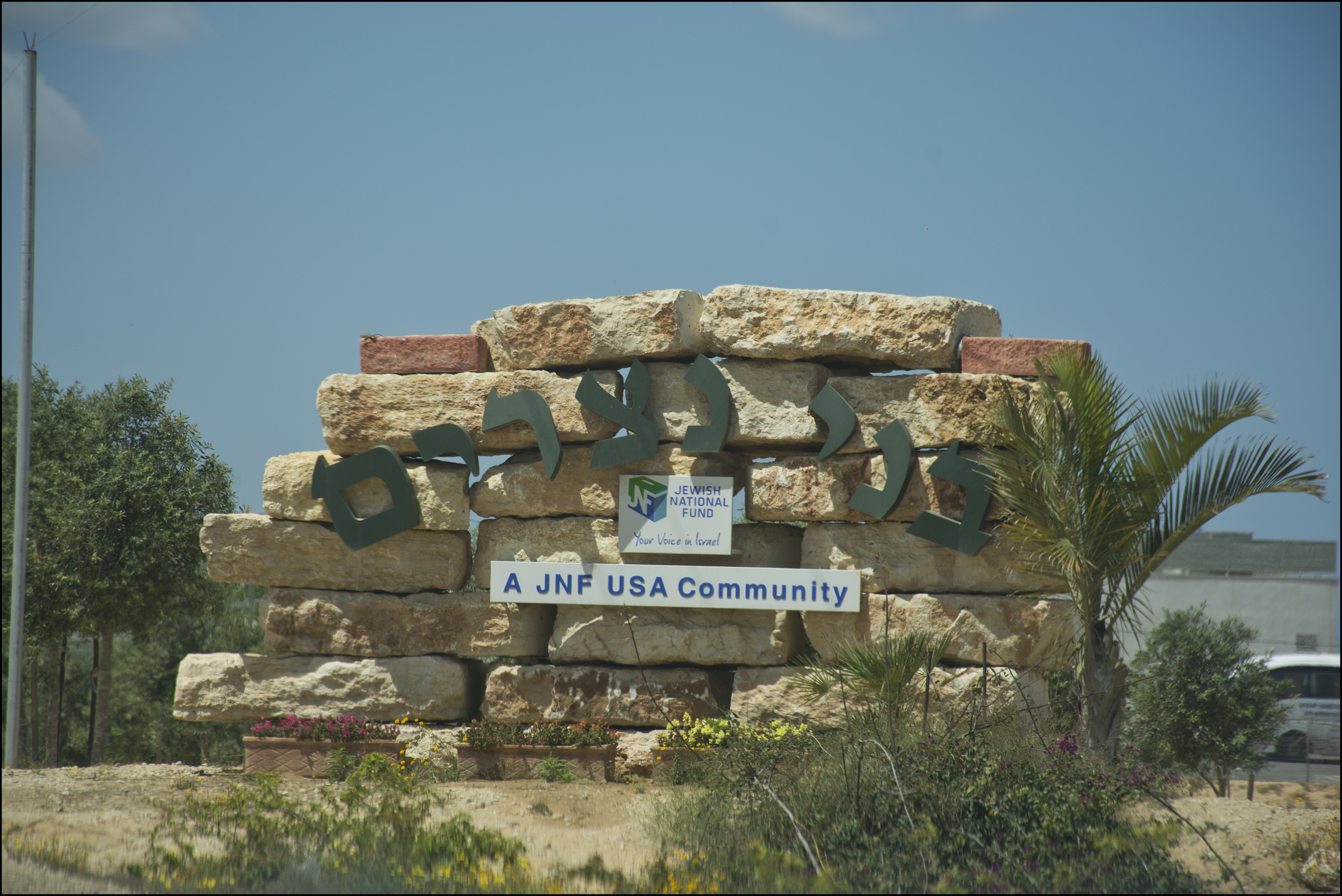
Entrnce to Bnei Netzarim
