= Ariel (Israeli settlement) =

Illegal Israeli settlement in the West Bank

Coordinates: 32°6′22″N 35°11′16″E

Ariel: אֲרִיאֵל; أريئيل
- City (from 1998)

Hebrew transcription(s)
  - ISO 259: ʔariˀel
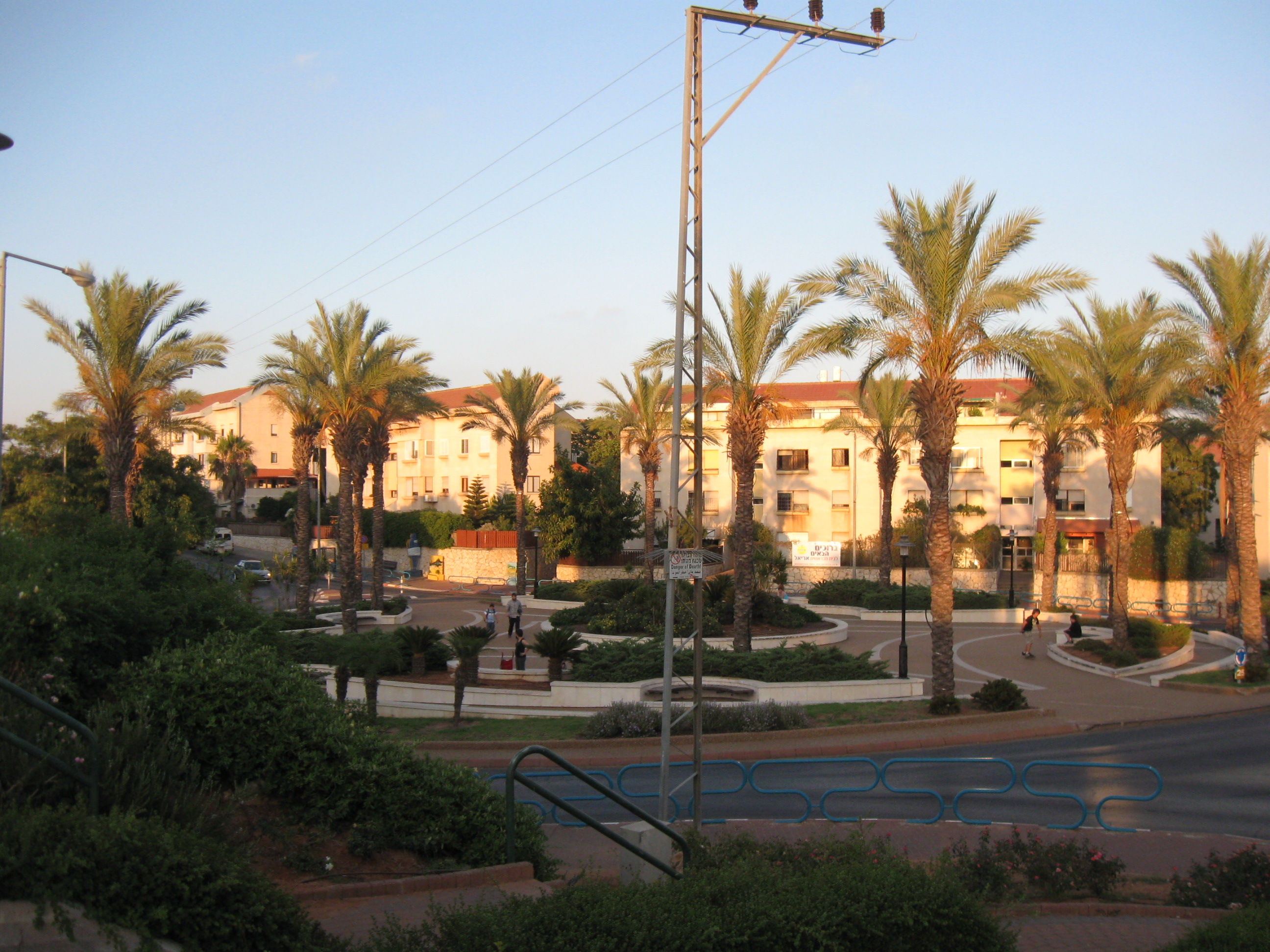

- Interactive map of Ariel
- Location of Ariel Ariel (the West Bank)
- Region: West Bank
- District: Judea and Samaria Area
- Founded: 1978

Government
  - Mayor: Yair Chetboun

Area
  - Total: 14,677 dunams (14.677 km^{2}; 5.667 sq mi)

Population (2024)
  - Total: 22,191
  - Density: 1,512.0/km^{2} (3,916.0/sq mi)
- Name meaning: Lion of God

Ariel (Hebrew: אֲרִיאֵל; Arabic: أريئيل) is an Israeli settlement organized as a city council in the central West Bank, part of the Israeli-occupied territories, approximately 20 kilometres (12 mi) east of the Green Line and 34 kilometres (21 mi) west of the Jordan border. Ariel was first established in 1978 and its population was 22,191 in 2024, composed of veteran and young Israelis, English-speaking immigrants, and immigrants from the former Soviet Union, with an additional influx of above 10,000 students from Ariel University. It is the fifth largest Israeli settlement in the West Bank, after Modi'in Illit, Beitar Illit, Ma'ale Adumim, and Givat Ze'ev.

The international community considers Israeli settlements in the West Bank illegal under international law, but the Israeli government disputes this.

Ariel's jurisdiction spans 14,677 dunams (1,467.7 hectares), and borders the Palestinian towns and villages Salfit, Marda and Iskaka. According to B'Tselem, within Ariel's municipal area there are several enclaves of privately owned Palestinian land, whose owners are not allowed access to them.

== Etymology ==
Ariel (pronounced Ari'el), literally translates to 'Lion of God'. In Hebrew, Ari (Lion) is also a synonym for bravery and courage; it also serves as the symbol of the Tribe of Judah. The city is named after Jerusalem, as 'Ariel' appears in the Hebrew Bible as one of the names for Jerusalem and the Temple of Jerusalem (Isaiah 29:1–8).

== History ==
Ariel was founded in 1978 on land that was seized for military needs and on land that was declared state land, including cultivated farmland of Palestinian villages in the district and on rocky land the villagers used for grazing their flocks. At the beginning of 1978, a group of Israelis formed in order to create a settlement in the hills of the northern part of the West Bank made a formal request to the government to be given land to build a new community and were given three options by the army; the area near the 'lone tree' which would later become Barkan, the area which would later become Kfar Tapuach, and a hill near Kifl Hares that was known to the local Arabs as 'Jabel Mawat', the hill of death, because of inhospitable terrain. The leader of this group, Ron Nachman, chose the latter because of its strategic location on a possible Jordanian invasion route towards Israel's main population centre of Tel Aviv. In the spring of 1978, some of the group's men erected tents on the chosen hilltop, and in August 1978, a total of forty families came to live in the settlement.

The original members of the group had gone through a screening process in order to put together a mix of skilled adults as well as young families that would be prepared psychologically to withstand starting a new settlement from scratch with little infrastructure and modern comforts. There were no paved roads or paths. Water was supplied periodically by a tanker truck. Electricity was provided by a generator since no electrical network existed in that area. Tents were replaced by prefabricated concrete blocks which served as living quarters, schools, and an infirmary. On September 1, 1978, the school year was officially opened.

From 1978 to 1988, Ariel continued to develop, and established itself as the urban center for the nearby Israeli settlements. In 1980, the prefabricated homes were replaced with permanent housing. The College of Judea and Samaria, which would later become the Ariel University Center of Samaria, and eventually Ariel University, was founded in 1982. Three elementary schools, a community center, a sports hall, and a synagogue were built. In May 1982, Ariel was connected to the national power grid.

During the mass immigration of Jews from the Soviet Union that began in 1989 and continued throughout the 1990s, Ariel, which had a population of 8,000 in 1990, experienced a population boom. Unlike in Israel proper, apartments in Ariel were plentiful and cheap, which proved attractive to the immigrants. Some 6,000 Soviet immigrants moved to Ariel, almost doubling its population.

In 2005, the residents of Netzarim, a former Israeli settlement in the Gaza Strip which had been evacuated, found temporary housing in the dormitories of the Ariel University Center of Samaria. At the beginning of the academic year, about one-third chose to settle permanently in Ariel, while the rest moved to Yevul. In 2007, the city began receiving immigrants from English-speaking countries such as the United States, United Kingdom, Canada, and South Africa in significant numbers. Both religious and secular Jews reside in Ariel. The city has sixteen synagogues.

Nachman, a central figure in the Likud party, presided over Ariel from 1978 until his death in January 2013, at first as head of the local council and as mayor from 1985, when the settlement was officially recognized as a city. Nachman was succeeded as mayor in 2013 by Eliyahu Shaviro, who served as mayor until 2024, when Yoni Chetboun was elected as mayor.

On 15 November 2022, three Israelis were murdered during an attack near Ariel.

On 4 August 2025, US House Speaker Mike Johnson and US Ambassador Mike Huckabee visited Ariel where they were hosted by Mayor Yair Chetboun. They expressed support for this city, and to date were the highest ranking foreign government officials to visit Israeli communities in the West Bank.

== Geography ==
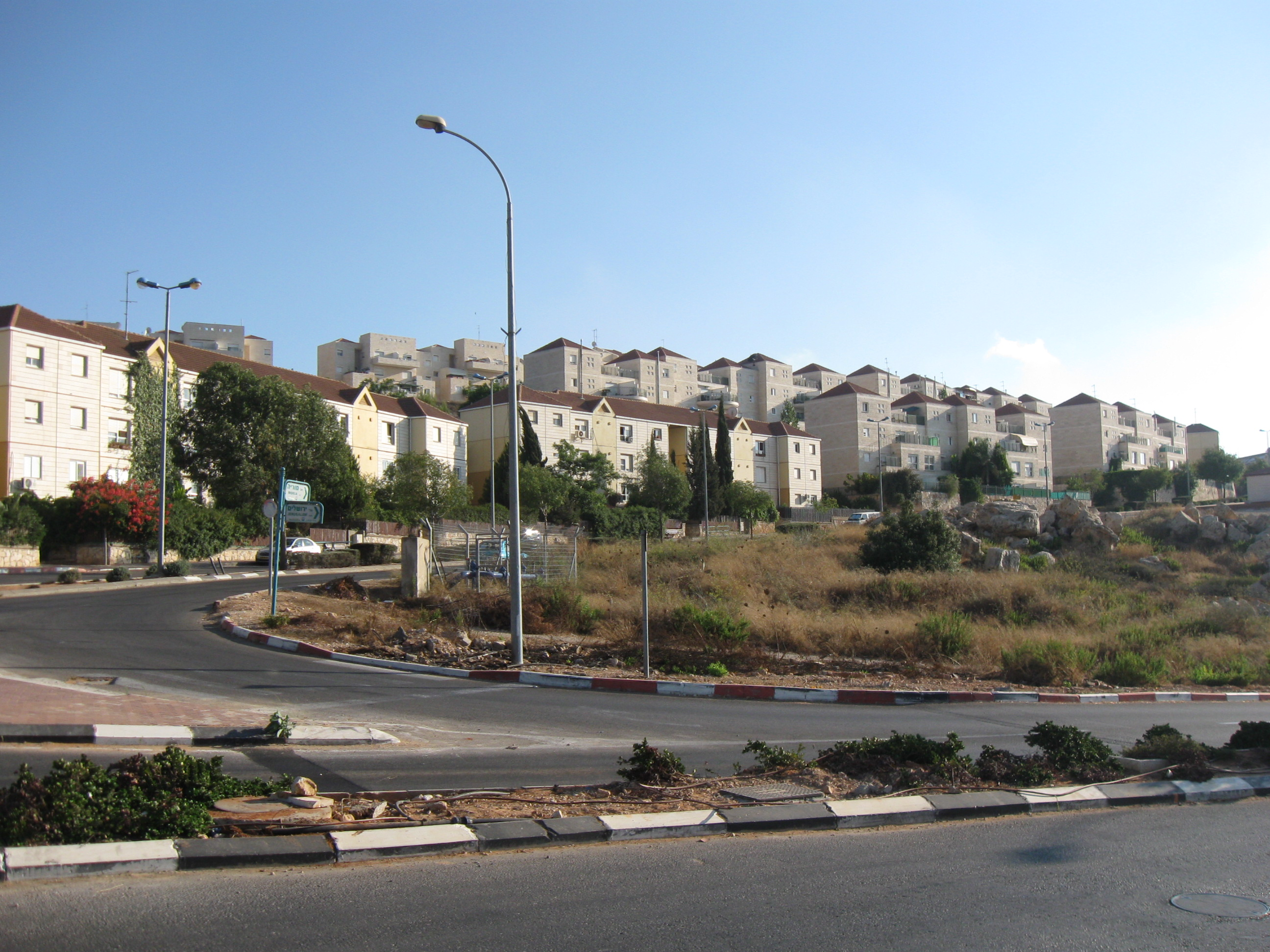
A neighborhood in Ariel

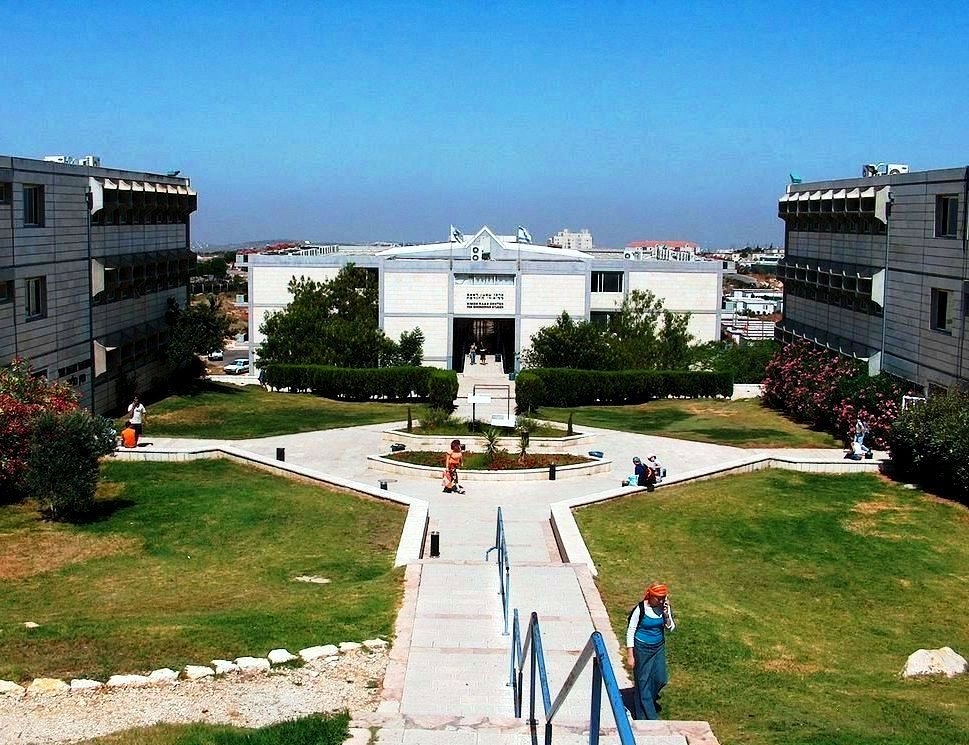
Ariel University

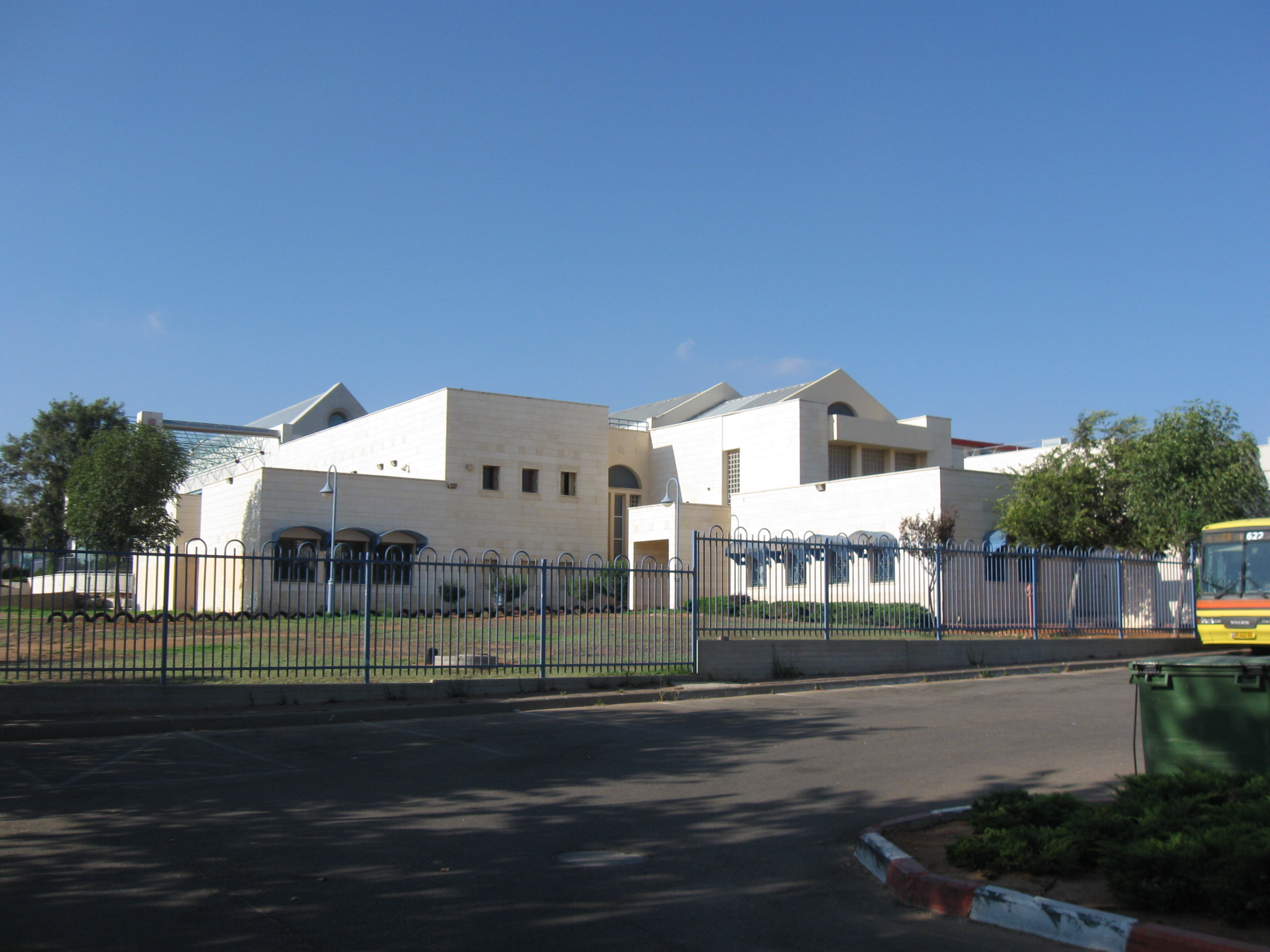
ORT Educational Center Yovaley-Ariel

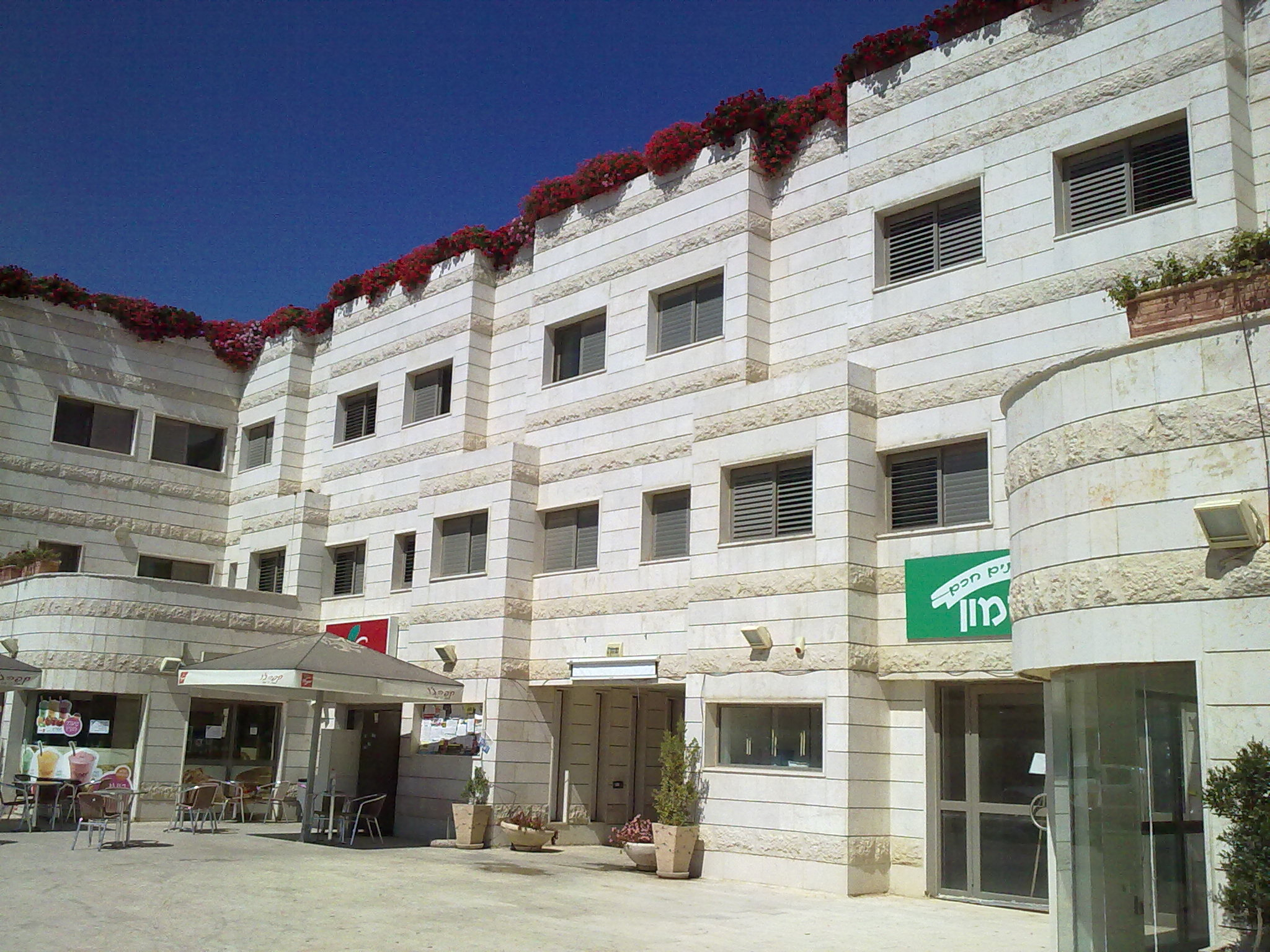
Students dormitory of University Center

Ariel is situated between 17 and 22 kilometres (10 1/2 and 13 1/2 miles) east of the Green Line, and 34 km (21 mi) west of the Jordan River, Jordan's western border. Ariel is adjacent to the Palestinian Authority town of Salfit and southwest of Nablus. It is approximately 30 km (20 mi) east of Petah Tikva, and 42 km (26 mi) east of Tel Aviv to which it is connected by the Highway 5 and 60 km (37 mi) northwest of Jerusalem, to which it is connected by Highway 60.

Ariel's jurisdiction spans 14,677 dunams (1,467.7 hectares), and borders the Palestinian towns and villages Salfit, Marda and Iskaka. Ariel's municipal area contains several enclaves of privately owned Palestinian land, whose owners are not allowed access to them. The central water pumping station in Salfit has been polluted several times by overflow from the wastewater in Ariel.

Just south of Ariel's Rova Dalet neighborhood is the archaeological site of Khirbat ash-Shajara.

== Economy ==
The city has several shopping centres and two industrial zones (divided into light and heavy industry), a library. In July 2008, Israel approved the construction of 27 new factories, which were expected to be completed by September 2009.

== Israeli-Palestinian conflict ==
=== Status under international law ===
Like all Israeli settlements in the Israeli-occupied territories, Ariel is considered illegal under international law, though Israel disputes this. A series of Israeli governments has insisted that Ariel be included within Israel's future borders under any future peace treaty. The Israeli Ministry of the Interior gave the municipality of Ariel the status of a city council in 1998. In January 2010, Prime Minister Benjamin Netanyahu, accompanied by leading figures in his governing coalition, declared Ariel the "capital of Samaria", and "an integral part of Israel". In December 2010, thirty-five MKs petitioned the government to annex Ariel to Israel. Palestinian representatives have opposed the incorporation of Ariel into Israel in any future settlement, arguing that the Ariel 'finger' would interrupt the territorial integrity of a Palestinian state and includes a major aquifer. Ariel's future is thus not clear: "as well as an obstacle to an Israeli-Palestinian agreement, it could also serve as a crucial trade-off for negotiators hammering out a final deal." McDonald's Israel, the local subsidiary of the international fast food chain, turned down an offer to open a restaurant in Ariel in June 2013, citing its declared policy not to open any branches in West Bank settlements across the Green Line.

In August 2025, U.S. House Speaker Mike Johnson, one of the highest-ranking American officials ever to visit an Israeli settlement in the West Bank, traveled to Ariel, where he delivered a speech at a celebratory event attended by Ariel Mayor Yair Chetboun and other West Bank settlement leaders. During his remarks, Johnson declared that the "mountains of Judea and Samaria" belong to the Jewish people "by right."

=== West Bank barrier ===
The Israeli West Bank barrier was originally planned to extend out from the Israeli border to Ariel. Under American political pressure, the "finger", as the extension of the fence to include Ariel is often called, was not built. Instead, Ariel has a security fence surrounding it on only three sides.

=== First Intifada ===
In mid-1989, during the First Intifada, the settlement came under controversy after the mayor ordered all Palestinians working in the settlement to wear visible badges identifying them as "foreign workers." The order was criticised across the political spectrum in Israel, including Likud MK Ehud Olmert who called it "insensitive and unwise" and Ratz MK Yossi Sarid who said he was "disgusted," with some commentators comparing the order to the yellow badges imposed by Nazi Germany on Jews. The settlement's mayor criticised the comparisons to Nazi Germany, saying that "only a warped mind, ignorance and stupidity" could compare the situation to "the security needs of every settlement in Judea, Samaria and Israel." However, the settlement subsequently reversed the order.

== Education and culture ==
Ariel is home to the Ariel University, founded in 1982 as the College of Judea and Samaria. In 2010, the university had a student population of 11,500, both Israeli and Palestinian. In 2007, it changed its name to Ariel University Center of Samaria, a change that was officially recognized in 2010. In 2012, it received accreditation as a research university.

The state-funded Ariel Center for the Performing Arts opened on November 8, 2010, with a performance of Piaf by the Beersheba Theater company. These performances were boycotted by sixty Israeli actors, writers, and directors, including Joshua Sobol, who refuse to perform in settlements. Prime Minister Benjamin Netanyahu, Culture Minister Limor Livnat and the leader of the Kadima Party Tzipi Livni condemned the boycott and proposed cutting government funding those participating in it. The boycott was supported by 150 academics including Amos Oz, David Grossman and A. B. Yehoshua, It was opposed by Amnon Shamosh, who suggested that the boycott plays into the hands of right-wing extremists by linking art and politics. 150 U.S. actors supported the boycott. However, five Israeli actors later withdrew from the boycott, indicating that they changed their mind or thought the letter they were signing called for a discussion on the issue rather than outright boycott.

== Voting Patterns ==
In the 2022 election, 62 percent of voters in Ariel voted for the parties of the right-wing coalition led by Benjamin Netanyahu, while 34 percent voted for the parties of the center-left coalition led by Yair Lapid and 0.2 percent voted for the Arab parties.

In the 2026 election, 57 percent of voters in Ariel voted for the parties of the right-wing coalition led by Benjamin Netanyahu, while 34 percent voted for the parties of the center-left coalition led by Gadi Eisenkot and 0.2 percent voted for the Arab parties. An additional 3.8 percent voted for the Reservists, and 3.1 percent voted for Amcha Yisrael. Voter turnout increased 22 percent from the 2022 election.

== International relations ==
=== Twin towns/ Sister cities ===
Ariel is twinned with:

- Heredia, Costa Rica
- Mobile, Alabama, United States
- Ceadîr-Lunga, Moldova
- Divjakë, Albania
