= Khirbat ash-Shajara =

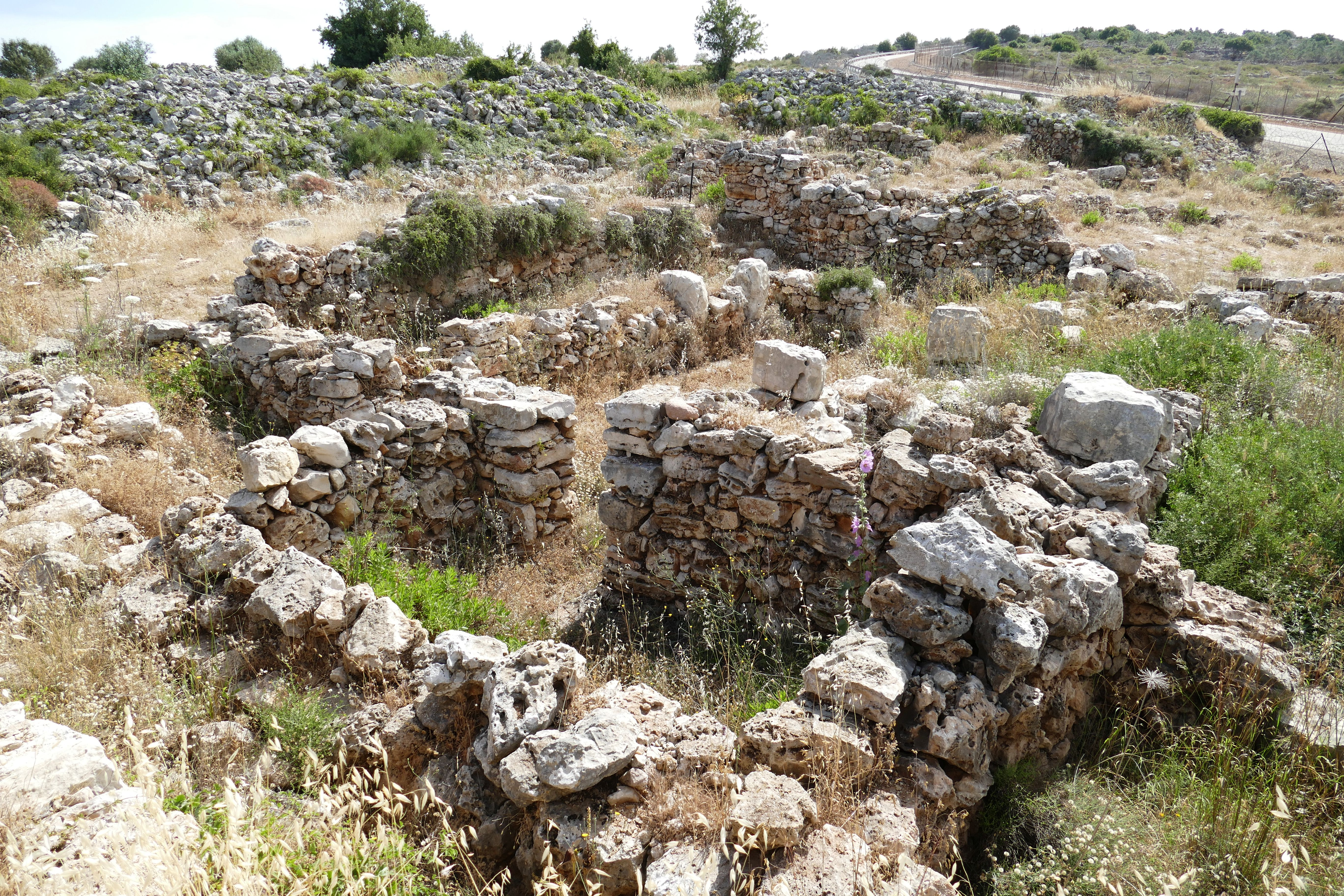
- Remains of structures unearthed at Khirbat ash-Shajara

- Shown in the West Bank
- 32°5′45″N 35°11′3″E
- Periods: Iron Age I, Iron Age II
- Location: Salfit Governorate, West Bank
- Region: Southwestern Samaria, West Bank

Khirbat ash-Shajara is an archaeological site in Samaria, West Bank. It is situated between the Palestinian city of Salfit and the Israeli settlement and city of Ariel. The West Bank barrier runs south of the site, placing it in the Israeli side. The site covers about 10 dunams and today is covered by heaps of stones, piled by modern farmers, reaching up to 3-4 meters above the surrounding terrain.

In the late 19th century the site was visited by members of the Palestine Exploration Fund, who reported traces of antiquities. In the 1980s the site was studied by Israeli archaeologists as part of the Southern Samaria Survey (Site 16-16/76/01). Sherds of pottery vessels were found, about one-fifth dated to the Iron Age I (12–10 centuries BCE) and four-fifths to the Iron Age II (10–6 centuries BCE), when Samaria was part of the Kingdom of Israel. Some 100 meters west of the site, is another ruin with no name (Site 16-16/76/02), where finds are mostly dated to the Iron Age II and one sherd to the Hellenistic period (332–63 BCE).

South of Khirbat ash-Shajara lies a site called Khirbat Murad, where earlier remains dated to the Middle Bronze Age (20th-15th centuries BCE) were found.

In 2006 a team from the Israeli Staff Officer of Archaeology excavated the site.

The establishment of the West Bank barrier has disconnected the site from some of Salfit’s agricultural lands. Some inhabitants have protested the restriction of their access to agricultural lands located within the site and its environments.
