= Martyr Yasser Arafat Governmental Hospital =

Hospital in Salfit, West Bank, Palestine

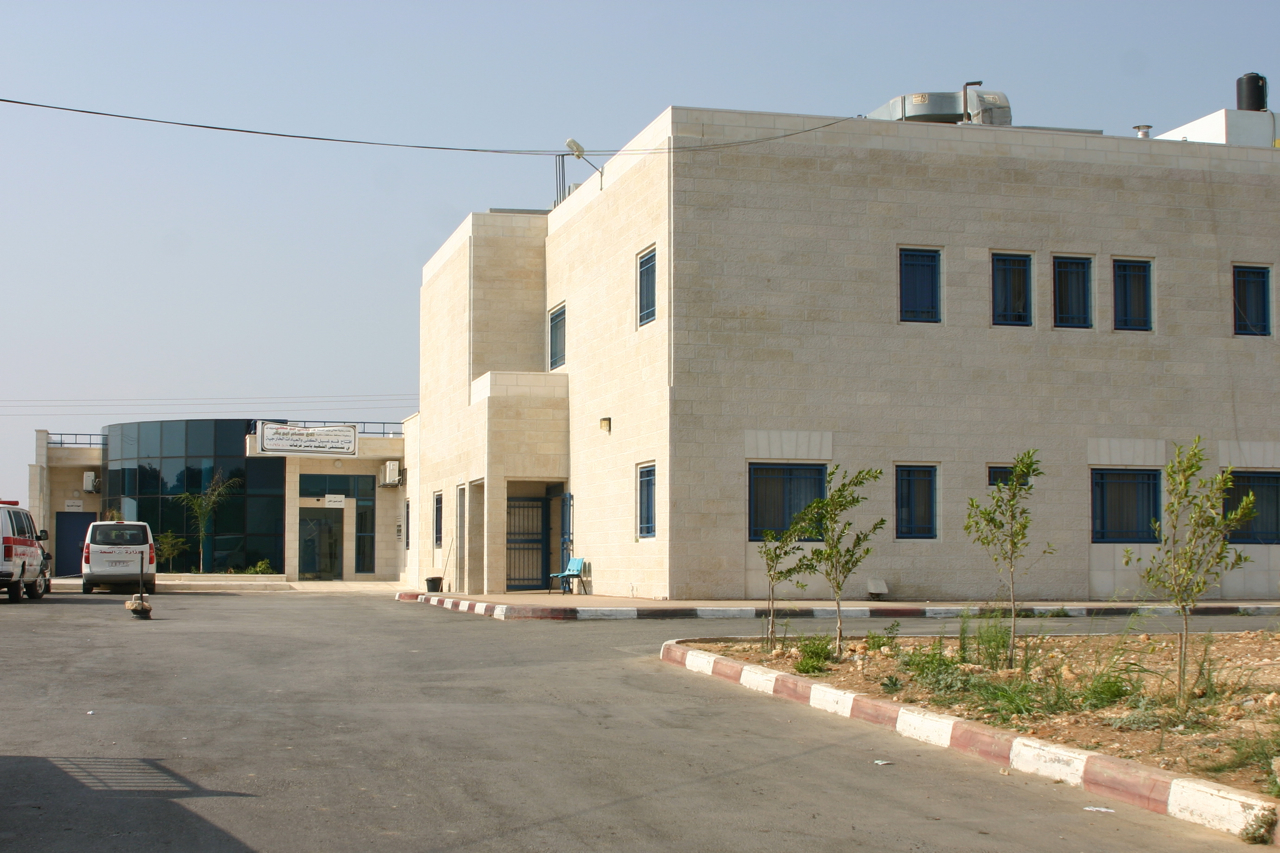

Geography
- Location: Salfit, Salfit Governorate, West Bank, Palestine
- Coordinates: 32°4′25″N 35°10′24″E

Services
- Emergency department: Yes
- Beds: 50

History
- Founded: 2006

Martyr Yasser Arafat Governmental Hospital or Salfit Governmental Hospital is a government hospital in the Salfit city, West Bank, Palestine. Followed by the Palestinian Ministry of Health. It was built in 2004 and was opened in 2006 and has 50 medical beds. It employs 200 staff, including doctors, nurses, pharmacists, physiotherapists, laboratory technicians, radiologists and others.

== History ==
In 1974, a health center was built in Salfit, providing primary health care services in addition to emergency and maternity services, and its staff numbered 40.In 1982, the Israeli occupation reduced the number of its staff, and reduced its area to a quarter, and the Casablanca Center for the mentally disabled was established. Later, during the first Palestinian Intifada, the Israeli occupation closed the entire center.
