= Ron Nachman =

Israeli politician (1942–2013)

- רון נחמן
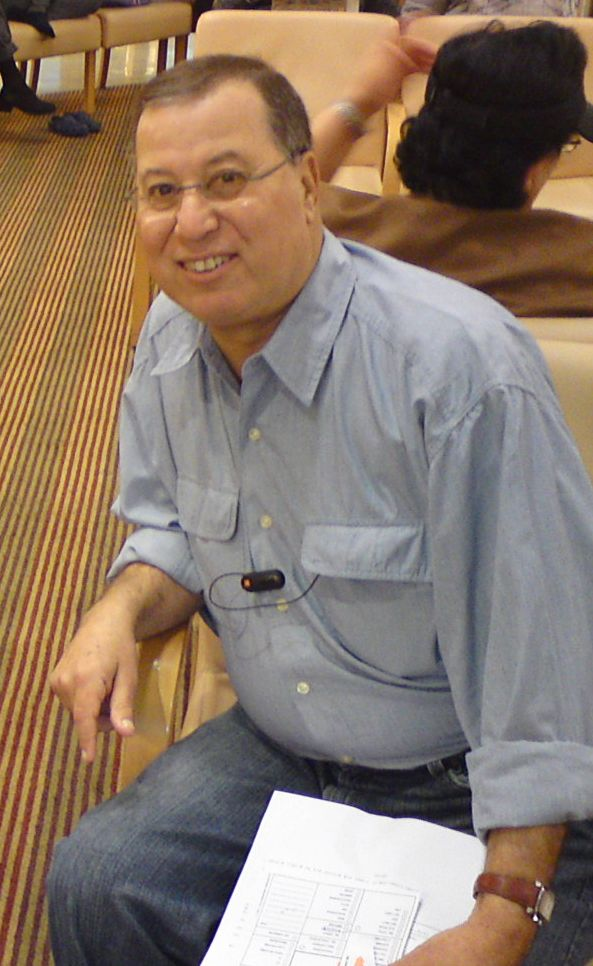

Faction represented in the Knesset
- 1992–1996: Likud

Personal details
- Born: 6 August 1942 Tel Aviv, Mandatory Palestine
- Died: 18 January 2013 (aged 70)

Ron Nachman (Hebrew: רון נחמן; 6 August 1942 – 18 January 2013) was an Israeli politician and Knesset member for the Likud. The founder of Ariel, one of the largest Israeli settlements in the West Bank, he was its mayor from 1985 until his death in 2013.

== Biography ==
Born in Tel Aviv during the Mandate era, Nachman studied at Tel Aviv University, where he gained an LLB and a BA in political science and law studies.

He joined the settlement enterprise in 1972. As a board member of Israel Military Industries he established the "Tel Aviv Group" to settle the territories captured by Israel in June 1967. It was only in 1978 that something actually took off on the ground. After helping found Ariel in 1978, he became its first mayor in 1985, and was re-elected four times.

Nachman had argued for making Ariel an integral part of Israel. Since 1997, he had worked to have the former College of Judea and Samaria upgraded to university status. Although the college had renamed itself the Ariel University Center of Samaria, both Minister of Education Yuli Tamir and the Council for Higher Education had vowed to block it. Nevertheless, in 2012 the College officially became a university, becoming the first university approved in Israel since the 1980s.

In 1992 he was elected to the Knesset on Likud's list and was a member of the finance and constitution, law and justice committees. He lost his seat in the 1996 elections.

Nachman was also alternate deputy chairman of the Zionist Council in Israel and a member of the Zionist Action Committee. He also served as deputy chairman of the Union of Local Authorities. He saw himself as the last of the secular settlers.

In February 2013, Nachman was posthumously awarded the Israel Prize.

== Death ==
Nachman died on 18 January 2013 while being treated in Beilinson Hospital after a long battle with cancer. He was 70 years old. He was buried at the Etgarim Park of the Nationwide Center for Development of Leadership overlooking Ariel, instead of the local cemetery. He had requested this exceptional location and special approval was given. Eulogies were given by Prime Minister Benjamin Netanyahu and Knesset speaker Reuven Rivlin among other personalities.
