= Ariel Center for the Performing Arts =

Israeli performing arts complex

The Ariel Performing Arts Center (Hebrew: המשכן לאומנויות הבמה אריאל, Hebrew pronunciation: [hamiʃˈkan leʔomanuˈjot habaˈma ʔaʁiˈʔel] HaMishkan LeOmanuyot HaBama Ariel) is an Israeli performing arts complex, established in 2010 in Ariel on the West Bank. It opened on November 8, 2010, with an acclaimed performance of Piaf by the Beersheba Theater company.

The opening was mired by an intended boycott by sixty actors, writers, and directors, including Joshua Sobol, who refuse to perform in settlements because it would "strengthen the settlement enterprise". Prime Minister Benjamin Netanyahu and other right-wing commentators characterized this as a "boycott... against Israel's citizens". The boycott is being supported by other Israeli artists such as Amos Oz, David Grossman, and Dani Caravan,; 150 U.S. actors have supported them in an open letter. though none of them have actually been invited to perform.
