= 2022 Kiryat Arba attack =

Shooting in the West Bank

- Part of the Israeli–Palestinian conflict
- Location: Givat Ha'avot, Kiryat Arba, Hebron
- Date: 29 October 2022
- Attack type: Shooting
- Deaths: Ronen Hanania and the perpetrator
- Injuries: 2 Israelis (1 seriously) and 1 Palestinian
- Perpetrator: Hamas militant Muhammed Kamel al-Jabari

On 29 October 2022, a Palestinian gunman affiliated with al-Qassam Brigades, the militant arm of Hamas, shot four people, killing one, in the West Bank settlement of Kiryat Arba.

== Attack ==
On 29 October 2022, Muhammad al-Jabari, a Palestinian resident of Hebron, entered the Givat Ha'avot area of the Kiryat Arba carrying an M16 rifle. 49-year old Israeli man Ronen Hanania was walking back to his car with his son (19 years old) holding grocery bags they had just gotten from a local convenience store, which was close to the Ashmoret checkpoint. As the Hananias began to unload their groceries, the gunman, who was hiding to the left or the vehicle, opened fire and fatally shot Ronen in the head and his son Daniel in the hand. The attacker then fled from the scene.

Daniel Hanania waited for fifteen minutes for emergency services to come, then headed back to the store until security forces arrived to the scene with paramedics. As he exited the store the shooter reappeared and began shooting at the people outside the store. A Magen David Adom paramedic was seriously injured along with a Palestinian bystander. A security guard rammed into the attacker with a car, and the shooter was then killed by an off-duty officer. Ronen Hanania was transferred to the Hadassah Medical Center in Ein Karem, Jerusalem, where he died of his injuries. He was buried in the Har HaMenuchot cemetery of Jerusalem.

== Perpetrator ==
The perpetrator was identified as Muhammed Kamel al-Jabari, a Palestinian elementary school teacher from Hebron. Jabari and his family are reported to be closely affiliated with the Palestinian militant group Hamas, which has carried out attacks against Israeli soldiers and civilians in Israel and its settlements in the West Bank in the past. Jabari's brother was one of the people who had been exchanged for Israeli abductee Gilad Shalit during a 2011 prisoner exchange between Israel and Hamas. According to The Jerusalem Post, Jabari was "terminally ill" with cancer at the time of the attack.

== Aftermath ==
Far-right Minister of Knesset Itamar Ben-Gvir claimed that his home had been fired at during the attack. IDF sources could not confirm his claim.

Israeli Prime Minister Yair Lapid thanked the security forces for their work in stopping al-Jabari and said he was praying for the injured victims, vowing to crack down on terror with a "strong hand."

In February 2023, Israeli forces demolished Jabari's house in Hebron.

== See also ==
- 2022 Beersheba attack
- November 2022 Ariel attack
