= 2022 Ariel attack =

2022 terror attack in the occupied West Bank

November 2022 Ariel attack
- Part of the Israeli–Palestinian conflict
- Location: West Bank
- Date: November 15, 2022; 9:28 – 9:48 AM (UTC+02:00)
- Attack type: mass stabbing, vehicle-ramming attack
- Deaths: 3 victims, 1 perpetrator
- Injuries: 3 victims
- Perpetrator: Mohammed Souf

On 15 November 2022, a Palestinian killed three Israelis near the Ariel settlement in the West Bank.

== Attack ==
On 15 November 2022, a vehicle-ramming and stabbing attack killed three Israelis and wounded three others in the West Bank settlement of Ariel. The attacker started by stabbing a security guard at the entrance to the Ariel Industrial Park and then fatally stabbed two men and wounded another during a knife attack at the Ten gas station which was 60–70 meters away. He left the scene with his vehicle which he rammed into a group of cars, fatally injuring a 50-year-old man from Kiryat Netafim. A civilian exited his car to help the wounded man which the perpetrator used as an opportunity to steal the man's BMW and drive off. He drove the vehicle to an area on the road with traffic where he tried to attack more cars. The killer was shot dead by civilians and security forces, at around 9:48 AM local time, twenty minutes after the attack had started.

== Perpetrator ==
An 18-year-old Palestinian man named Mohammed Souf from the village of Haris was identified as the perpetrator. He worked as a cleaner at the Ariel Industrial Park. He was associated with the West Bank's ruling Fatah party and his father was a member of the party. Souf did not have a criminal record, but his father had spent time in Israeli prison. His home was demolished by the Israeli military in May 2023.

== Reactions ==
US Ambassador to Israel Thomas Nides tweeted "Horrified by the rampage of one terrorist today in Ariel that left three Israelis dead, and as many wounded" while EU envoy Dimiter Tzantchev denounced the "despicable ramming and stabbing attack". Hamas lauded the attack as "heroic ... [and] a natural response to the escalating crimes of the occupation against the holy Al-Aqsa Mosque and its shedding of our people's blood."

== See also ==
- Timeline of the Israeli–Palestinian conflict in 2022
- 2022 Beersheba attack
- 2022 Kiryat Arba attack
