= Netzarim =

Former Israeli settlement in the Gaza Strip

Netzarim: נְצָרִים (Hebrew)
- Former Israeli settlement
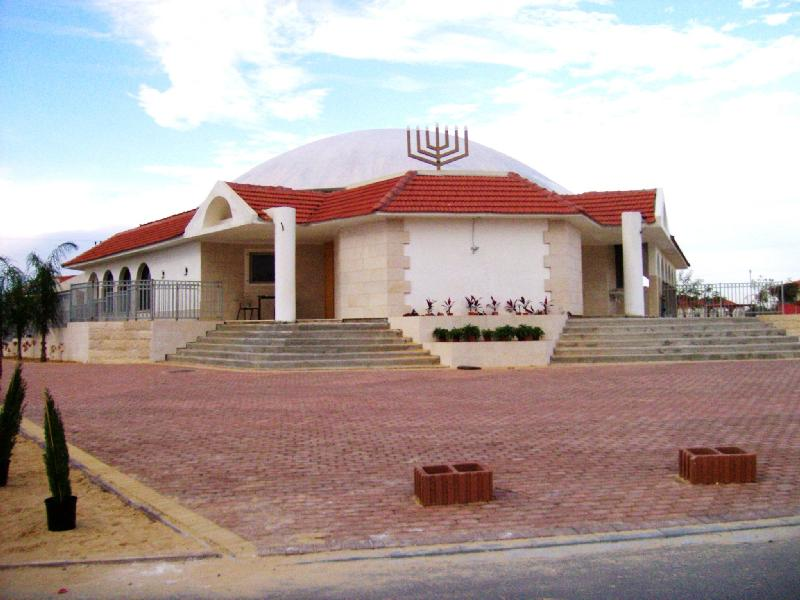
- Netzarim synagogue

- Location within the Gaza Strip
- Coordinates: 31°28′56″N 34°24′40″E
- Country: Israel
- Founded: 1984

Netzarim (Hebrew: נְצָרִים) was an Israeli settlement in the Gaza Strip about 5 kilometers southwest of Gaza City. It was established in 1972. In August 2005, the inhabitants of Netzarim were evicted by the Israel Defense Forces (IDF) as part of Israel's unilateral disengagement plan.

== History ==
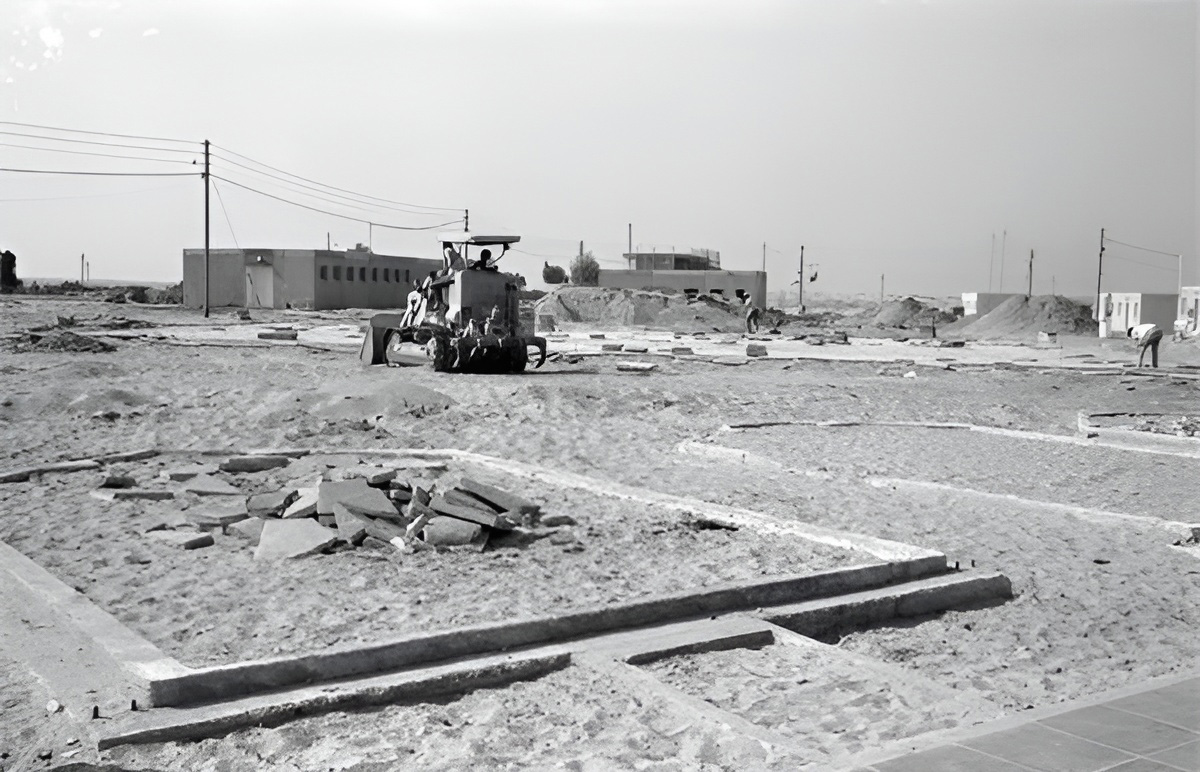
Construction by the Nahal of the Israeli base of Netzarim, in the Gaza Strip, November 1972.

It was initially established in 1972 as a military base on the outskirts of Gaza City. It began as a secular Nahal (Young Pioneer) outpost of the Hashomer Hatzair movement; in 1984 it became an orthodox kibbutz. A few years later, the residents decided to change from a kibbutz to a village. It was often referred to in the media as a stronghold for Religious Zionism. Its activities included a mango plantation and vineyard, hothouse cultivated yams and cherry tomatoes, and a prestigious etrog plantation.

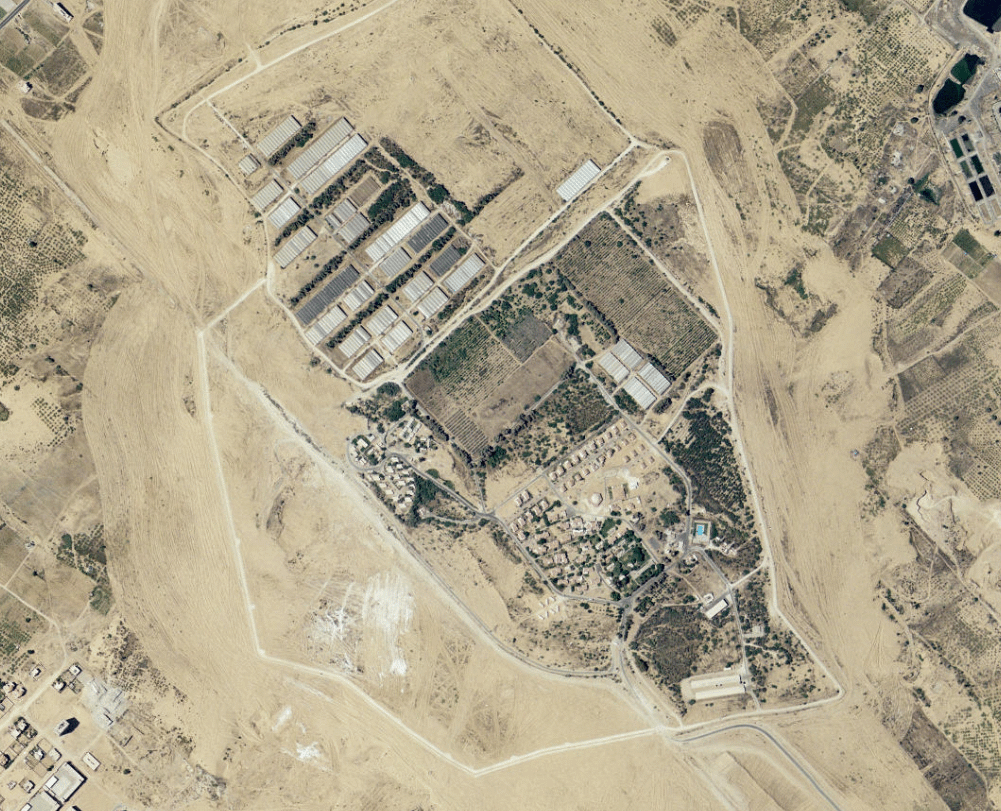
2004 satellite image of Netzarim

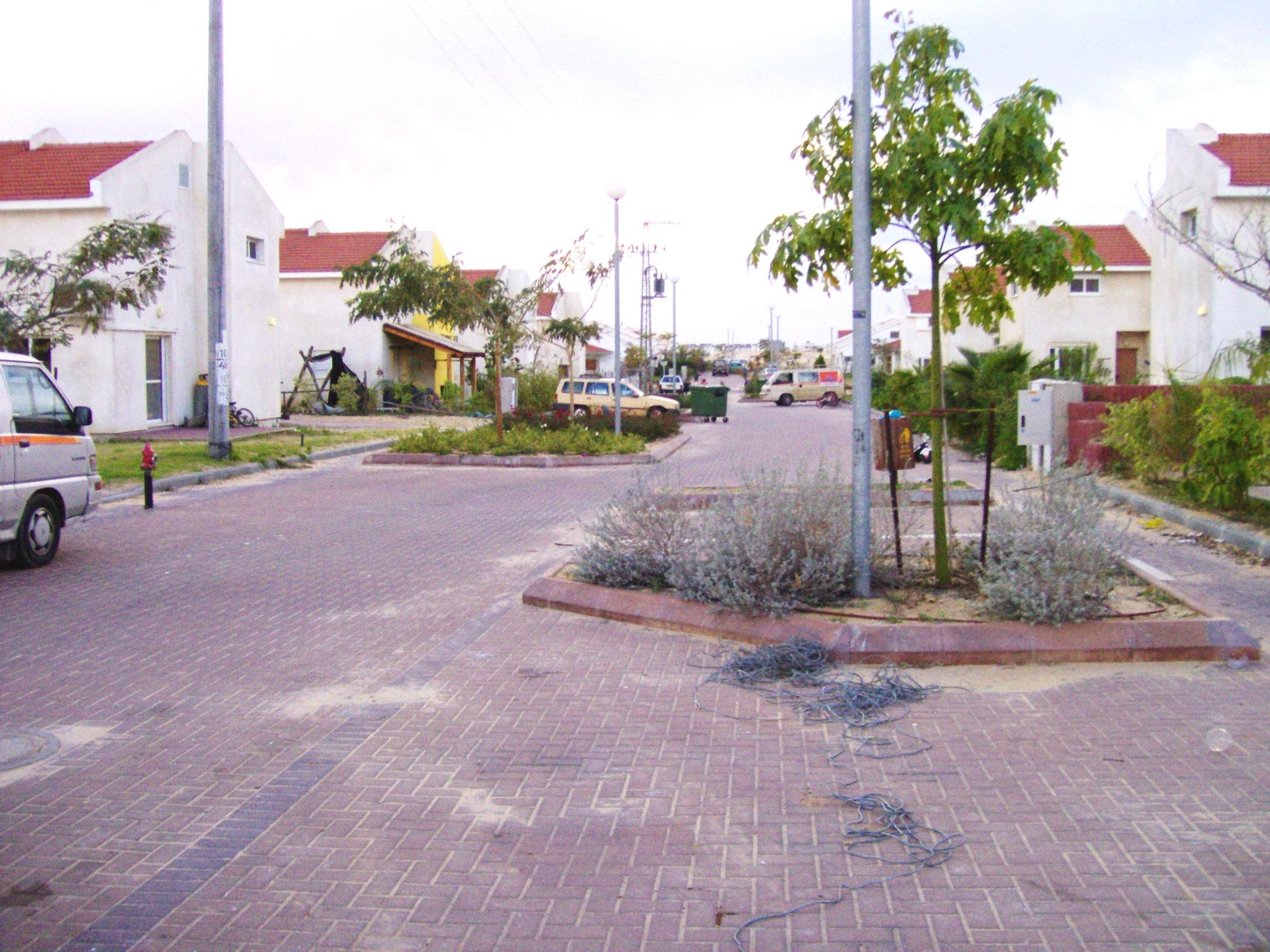
A street in the settlement in 1994

The settlement had day care centers, kindergartens, a primary school, a kollel, a Yeshiva, and the Jews of Gaza Heritage Institute, which documented Jewish settlement in Gaza over the generations. The development of educational institutions independent from the Gush Katif bloc was due to its isolated location and intensifying Palestinian attacks on traffic using the only route in during the al-Aqsa Intifada. During the last several years of its existence, transportation to and from Netzarim was permitted only with armed military escorts.

=== Eviction ===
The residents of Netzarim were the last Israelis to be evicted on 22 August 2005, by the IDF during Israel's unilateral disengagement plan from the Gaza Strip ordered by the government of Ariel Sharon. Their eviction marked the end of the Israeli presence in the Gaza Strip since the end of the 1967 Six-Day War. The strong religiosity of its residents was exhibited by seedlings being planted in the greenhouses, cement being laid for a new home that very morning, and a large prayer session in the main synagogue that was later destroyed by Palestinians, after the Israeli army abandoned the village in September 2005.

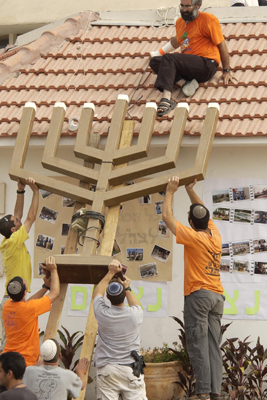
Dismantling of the menorah by settlers in 2005

After the eviction, the residents, who had prided themselves in not cooperating with any government agency involved in the eviction, were welcomed in the dormitories of the College of Judea and Samaria by the school administration, students, volunteers and residents of Ariel and the surrounding West Bank settlements. Before the beginning of the academic year, the former residents of Netzarim decided to split up into two groups. One group moved to the temporary government refugee camp of Yevul near the Egyptian border. The other group decided to stay in Ariel.

After Israeli troops left Netzarim on 12 September 2005, crowds of Palestinians pushed past police cordons, scavenging door frames and toilets. Some in the crowd tied the flags of Hamas and Palestinian Islamic Jihad around their necks as capes. Celebrating crowds set fire to the synagogue in Netzarim, similar to what was reported in Morag.

== Later events ==
=== 2008-2009 Gaza War ===
The IDF took possession of the former Netzarim site again during Operation Cast Lead and entered with 150 tanks and other military vehicles on 4 January 2009. The reoccupation of Netzarim effectively separated Gaza City from southern Gaza Strip, weakening Hamas' control of the region. On the early morning of 12 January, troops stationed at Netzarim began their northward push into Gaza City's Sheikh Ijlin neighborhood. When a ceasefire was declared by Israel on 17 January, the IDF gradually evacuated the site.

=== 2023–2025 Gaza war ===
The IDF launched an invasion of the Gaza Strip on 27 October 2023, as a response to the Hamas-led 7 October attacks on Israel. On 30 October 2023, IDF troops were confirmed to have entered the site of the former Netzarim settlement with infantry and tanks.

In late 2023, the IDF established a military road running across the Gaza Strip, intended to serve as a buffer zone separating Gaza City from the rest of the territory. It was named Netzarim Corridor as it includes the site of the former settlement.

After a ceasefire agreement with Hamas came into effect on 19 January 2025, the IDF withdrew from the Netzarim Corridor on 27 January. Israeli forces subsequently returned to the site of Netzarim and withdrew again on October 10, 2025 in compliance with the Gaza war peace plan.
