= Salfit =

Palestinian city in the West Bank

Coordinates: 32°04′55″N 35°10′56″E

Salfit سلفيت (Arabic)
- Municipality type A

Arabic transcription(s)
  - Arabic: سلفيت
  - Latin: Salfit (official); Salfeet (unofficial)
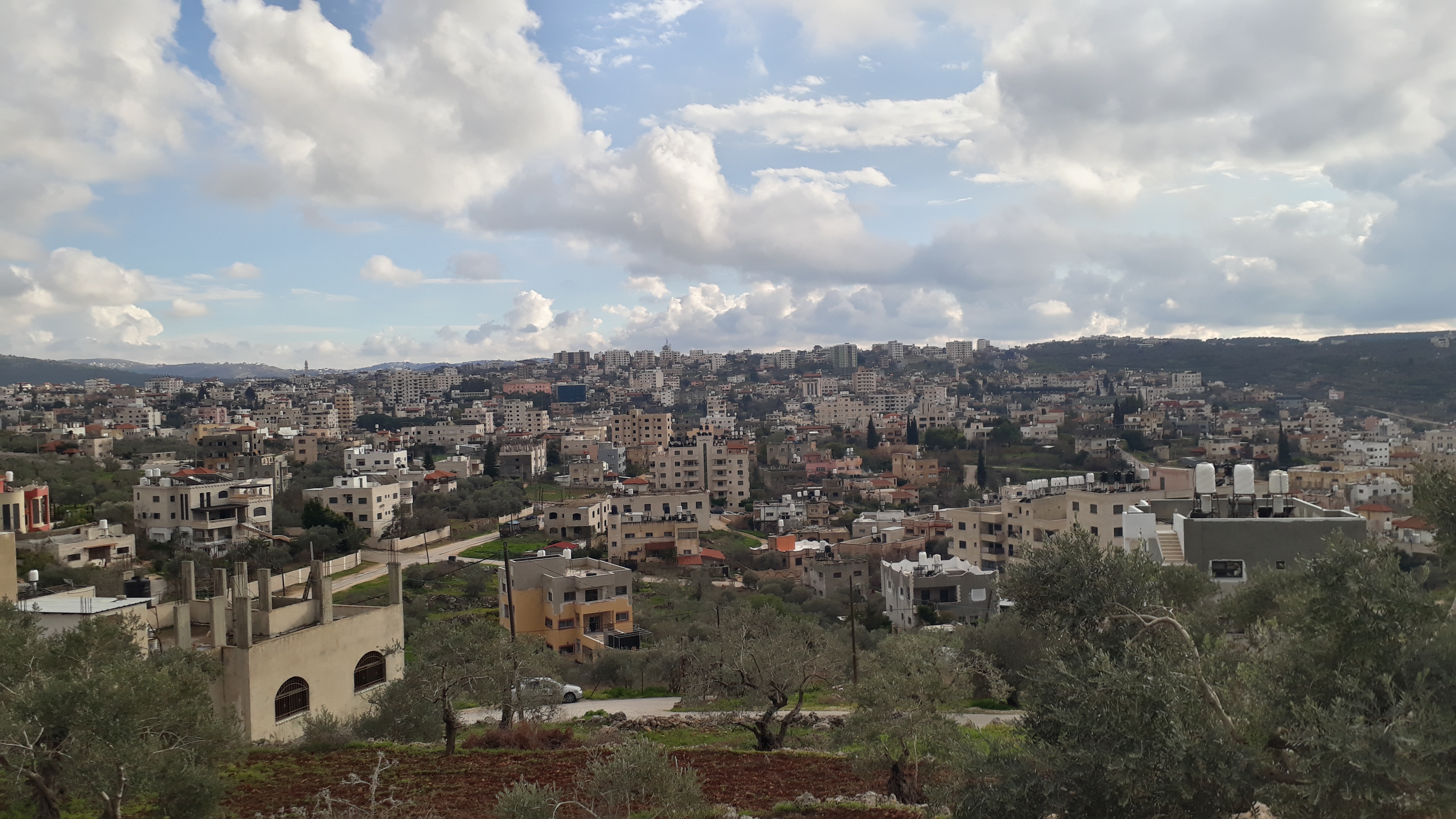
- General view of Salfit, 2024

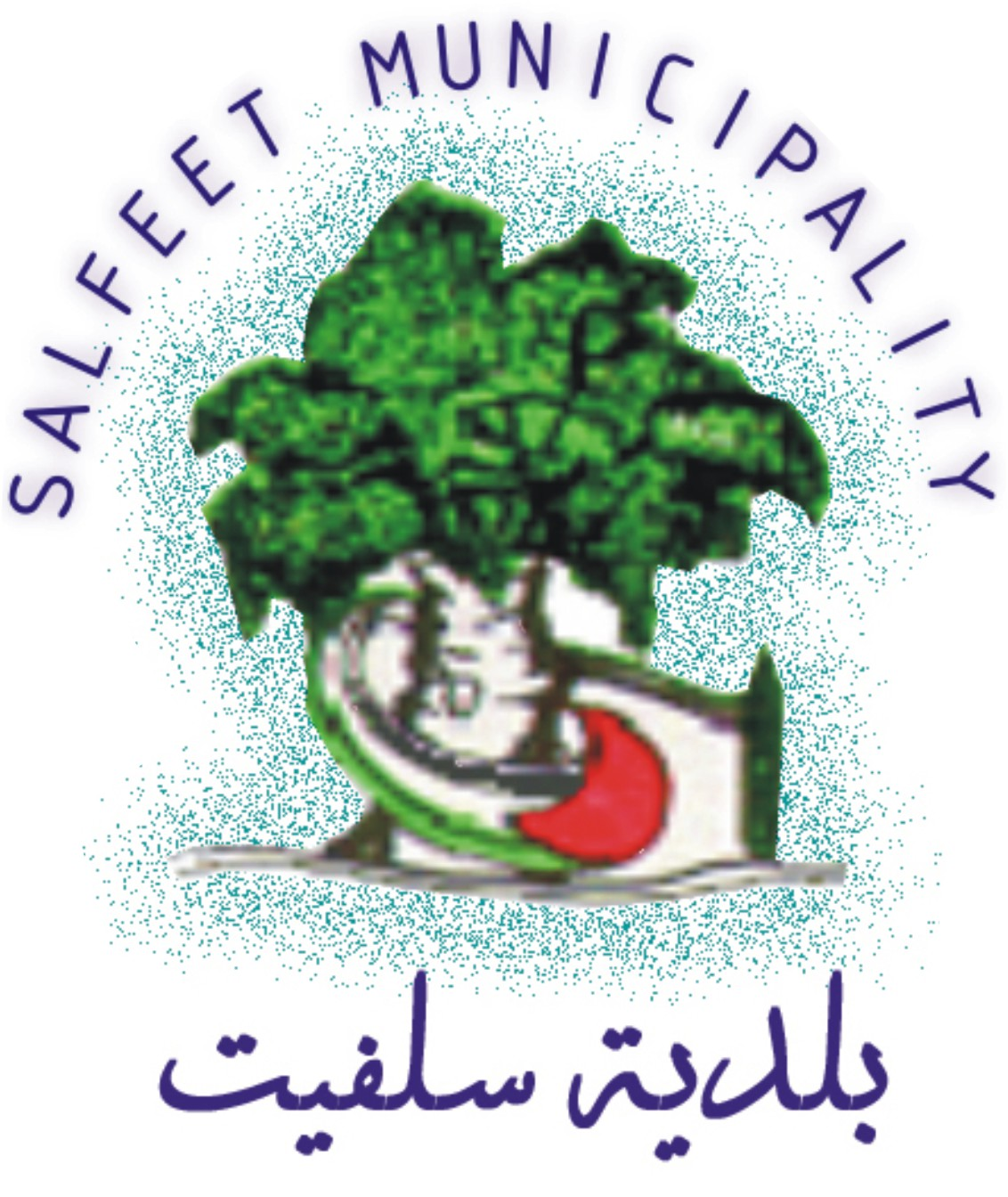
- Municipal logo
- Interactive map of Salfit
- Location of Salfit within the West Bank Location of Salfit within Palestine
- Palestine grid: 166/165
- State: State of Palestine
- Governorate: Salfit

Government
  - Type: Municipality
  - Head of Municipality: Abdulkareem Zubaidiyeh

Area
  - Total: 27.0 km^{2} (10.4 sq mi)
- Elevation: 570 m (1,870 ft)

Population (2017)
  - Total: 10,911
  - Density: 404/km^{2} (1,050/sq mi)
- Name meaning: Possibly "levelled sown field", or possibly "Basket of grapes"
- Website: www.salfit.info

Salfit (Arabic: سلفيت, romanized: Salfīt) is a city in the central West Bank, Palestine, and the capital of the Salfit Governorate. It is located adjacent to the Israeli settlement of Ariel. According to the Palestinian Central Bureau of Statistics (PCBS), Salfit had a population of 10,911 in 2017. Since the Interim Agreement on the West Bank and the Gaza Strip of the 1995 Oslo II Accord, Salfit, located in Area A, has been administered by the Palestinian National Authority, while continuing under Israeli military occupation.

== Etymology ==
According to Edward Henry Palmer, the name was possibly from "levelled sown field".

== History ==
Pottery sherds from the Iron Age I, Iron Age II, Persian, Hellenistic, and the Roman eras have been found, while no sherds from the Byzantine era have been found.

According to Ronnie Ellenblum, Salfit was re-established during early Muslim rule (7th–11th centuries) and continued to exist through the Crusader period. In the 12th and 13th centuries, Salfit was inhabited by Muslims. Pottery sherds from the Crusader, Ayyubid and Mamluk eras have also been found here.

=== Ottoman era ===
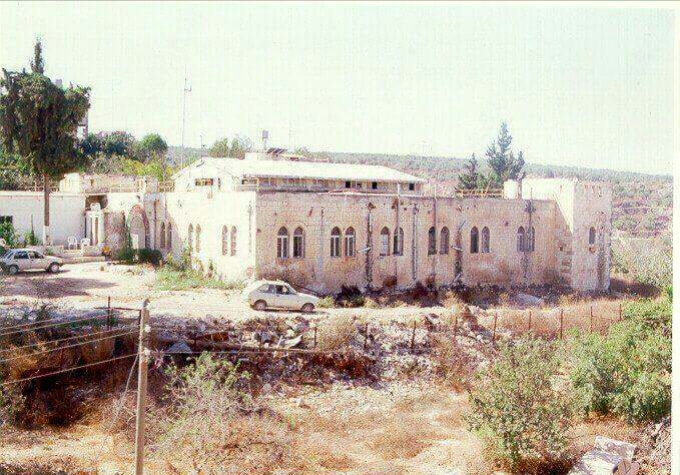
Former Ottoman Governance Building in Salfit, then Provincial Police Directorate. The building was destroyed by an Israeli army airstrike in 2001, during the Second Intifada, killing 6 members of the Palestinian security services

Salfit was incorporated into the Ottoman Empire in 1517 with all of Palestine, and sherds from the early Ottoman era have been found. The village appeared in Ottoman tax registers under the name of Salfit al-Basal as being in the Nahiya ("Subdistrict") of Jabal Qubal, part of the Sanjak of Nablus in 1596. The villagers paid a fixed tax rate of 33.3% on various agricultural products, such as wheat, barley, summer crops, olives, goats and/or beehives, in addition to "occasional revenues"; a total of 7,618 akçe.

The city formed part of the highland region known as Jūrat ‘Amra or Bilād Jammā‘īn. Situated between Dayr Ghassāna in the south and the present Route 5 in the north, and between Majdal Yābā in the west and Jammā‘īn, Mardā and Kifl Ḥāris in the east, this area served, according to historian Roy Marom, "as a buffer zone between the political-economic-social units of the Jerusalem and the Nablus regions. On the political level, it suffered from instability due to the migration of the Bedouin tribes and the constant competition among local clans for the right to collect taxes on behalf of the Ottoman authorities."

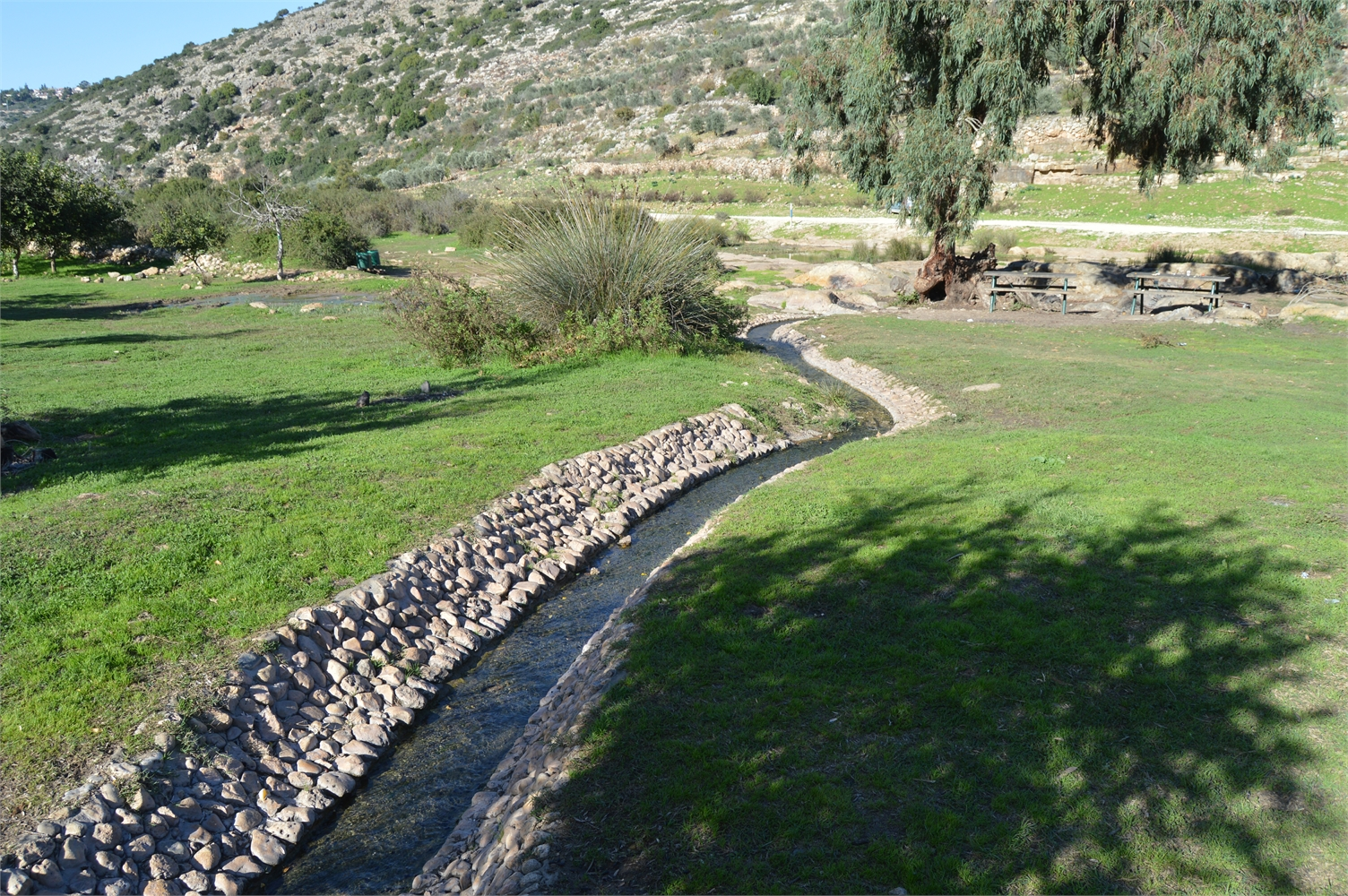
Springs of Qana valley, Salfit

It served as a hub for the local villages, and was one of many large commercial villages in the area that served a mediating role between the administrative center of Nablus and the smaller villages. It was noted as a Muslim village, Selfit, in Jurat Merda, south of Nablus in 1838. An Ottoman census conducted in 1870/1871 (1288 AH) listed the village in the nahiya (sub-district) of Jamma'in al-Thani, subordinate to Nablus. The city was described as "a large village, on high ground, with olive groves round it, and a pool to the east. It is apparently an ancient site with rock-cut tombs." by the PEF's Survey of Western Palestine in 1882. It further noted that there were two springs to the west of the village.

Towards the end of Ottoman rule, Salfit was one of the two largest villages in the District of Nablus that produced olive oil. At the time there were tensions between the residents of the village and the merchants of the administrative center of Nablus. The boys' school had about 100 pupils while the girls' school had 10 pupils. One of the reasons for the disparity was the locust attack on Salfit's crop earlier the previous year which had destroyed the village's harvest. Because of the consequent poverty and state of demise, parents kept their daughters at home to care for the family.

=== Modern era ===
==== British mandate ====
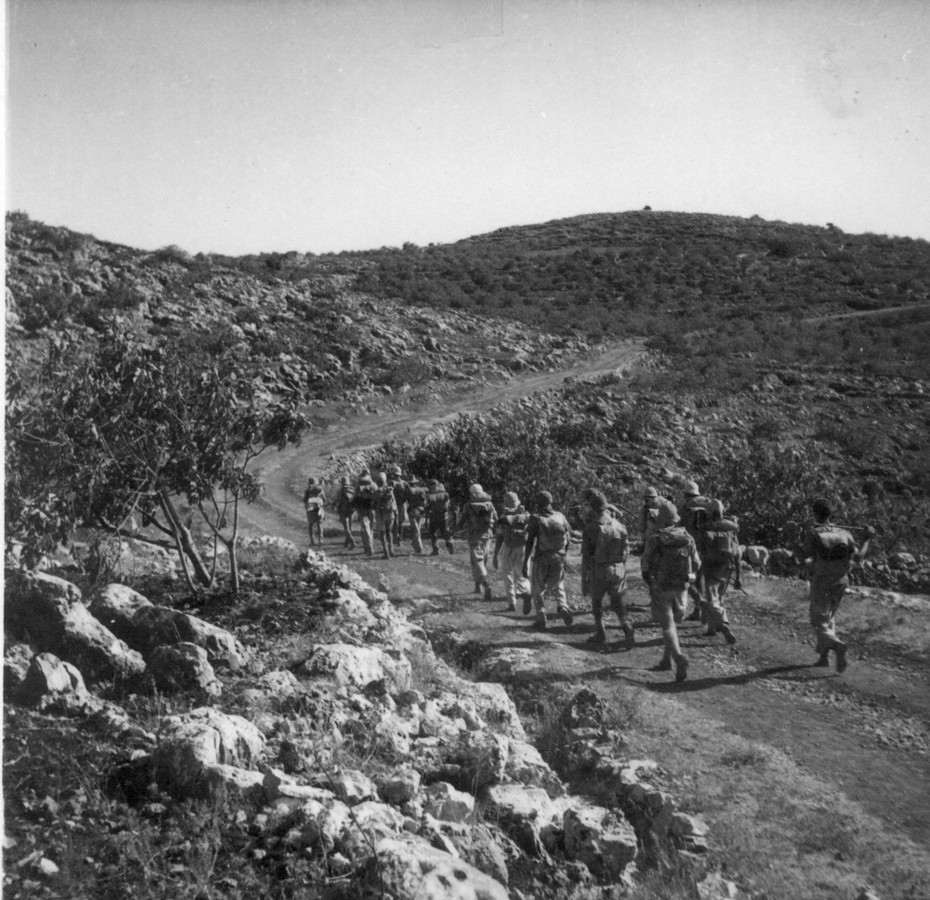
British patrol in 1945

The total land area was found to be 23,117 dunams, according to an official land and population survey. Of this, 10,853 were allocated for plantations and irrigable land, 3,545 for cereals, while 100 dunams were classified as built-up areas.

==== Jordanian occupation ====
In the wake of the 1948 Arab–Israeli War, and after the 1949 Armistice Agreements, Salfit came under Jordanian occupation. Salfit was the center of the Palestine Communist Party in 1948. Throughout the 1950s it became a major stronghold for communism and anti-Jordanian activity. Salfit was given municipality status in 1955.

==== Israeli occupation and settlement ====
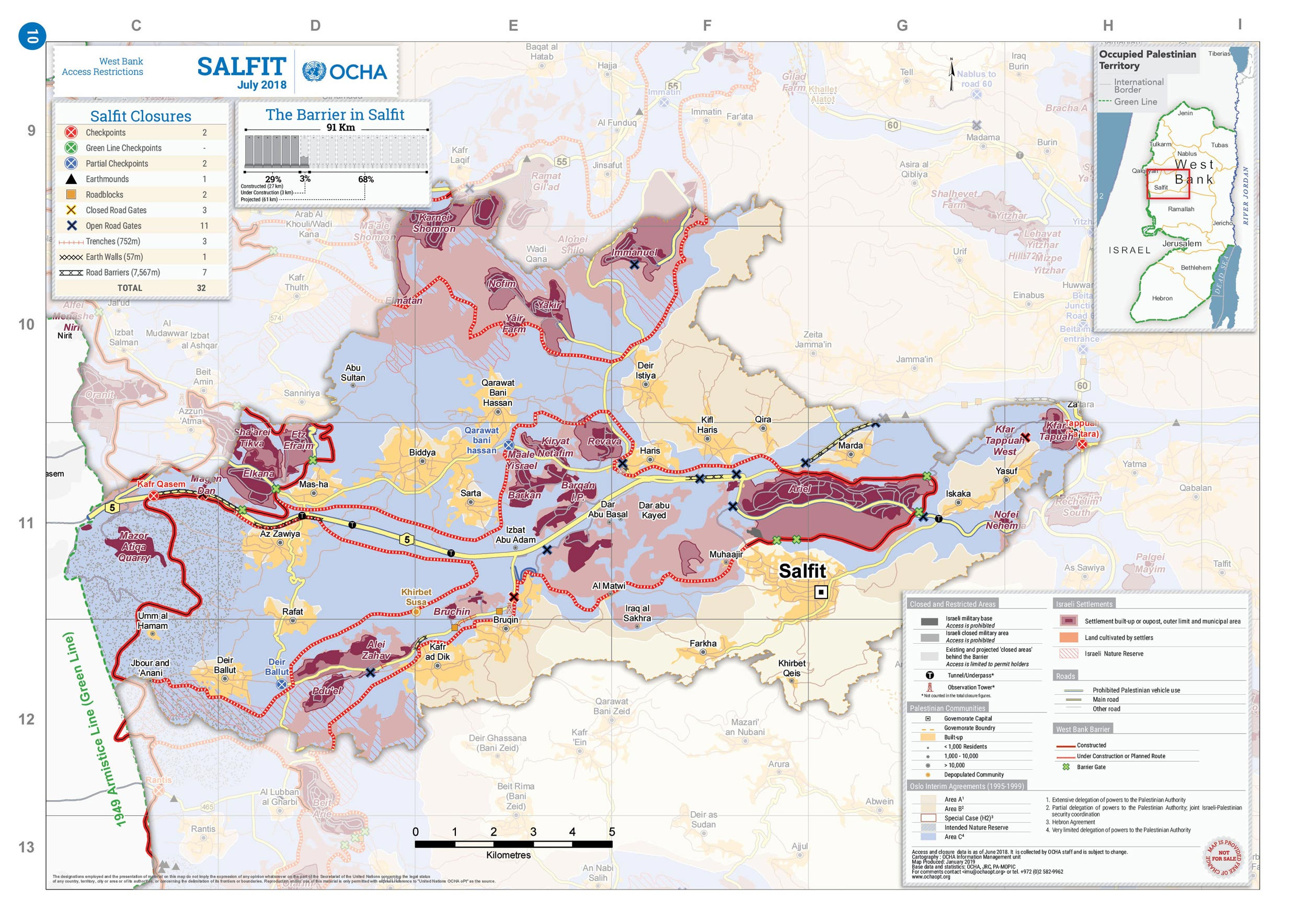
2018 Map of the Salfit Governorate, cut in two by illegal Jewish settlements (in purple and pink) and the Israeli separation barrier (red line).

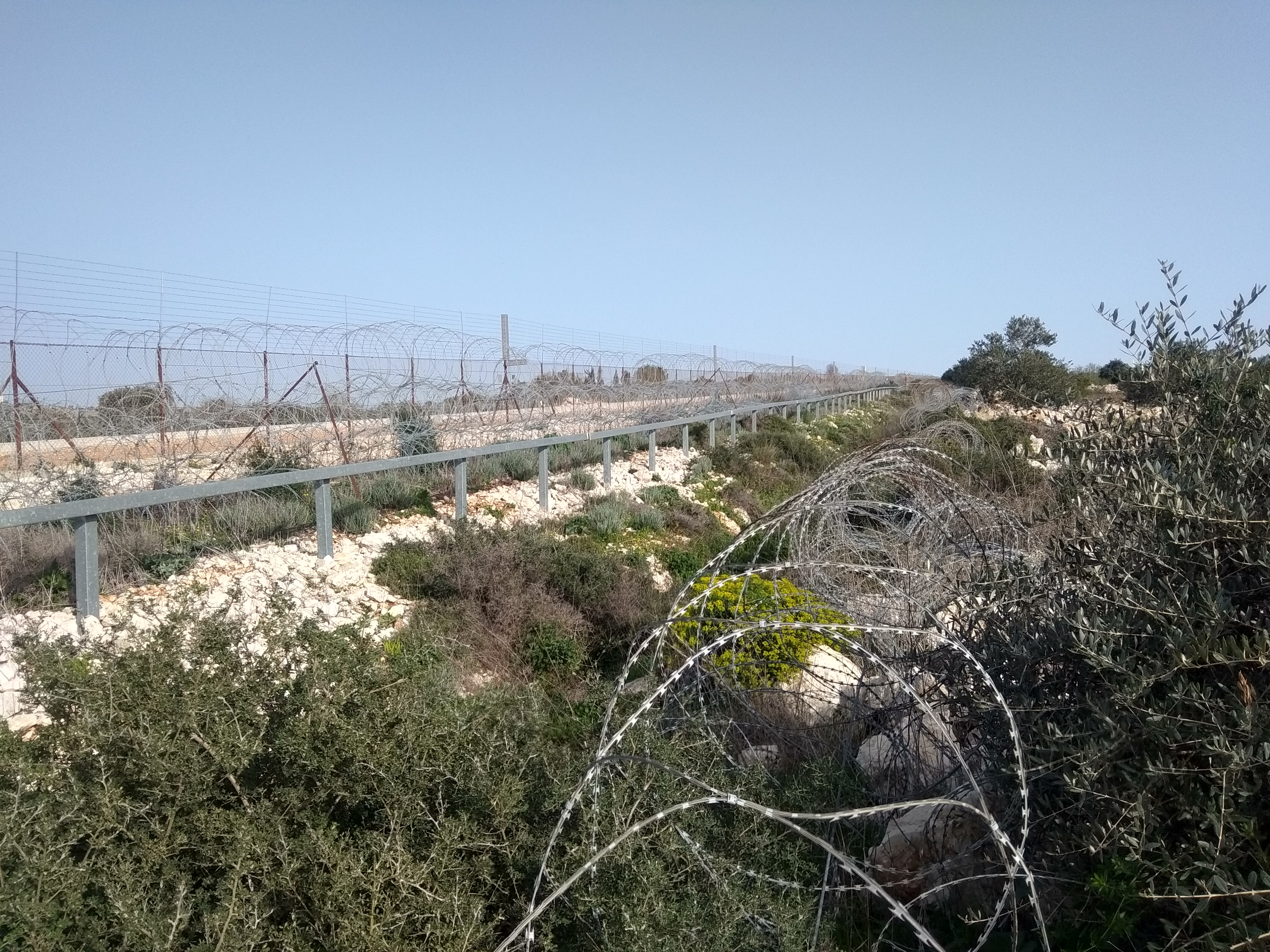
Israeli barrier separating Salfit from the Jewish settlement of Ariel, February 2019.

Salfit came under Israeli control after the 1967 Six-Day War. Between the 1960s and the late 1980s, Salfit's urban growth had mostly occurred eastward from the old town, which still served as a nucleus of activity in the city and the stone villas of the Zir and 'Afana clans still remain. A relatively large number of the town's residents, about 600 out of a population of 4500, worked labor jobs in Israel, and in the adjacent city of Ariel. The proximity to nearby settlements and the Israeli border, as well as the significantly higher wages, contributed to this greater proportion than other towns. Salfit remained a communist stronghold in 1989.

At the beginning of the first Intifada, nearly all workers boycotted their jobs in Israel and the following year, when many Palestinians ended their boycott, around half of the workers of Salfit refused to return to their jobs. Consequently, according to historian Glenn E. Robinson, between 1987 and 1989, a "virtual green revolution" took hold in the town as a result of the enthusiasm generated by the "back-to-the-land movement," agricultural expertise and the increase in additional workers. While prior to the uprising Salfit's residents acquired the bulk of their produce from the Nablus region and Israel, during the revolt the town became self-sufficient in both tomatoes, which were not grown at all previously, and cucumbers. Other agricultural products such as potatoes, eggplants, peppers, cauliflower and beans were grown in greenhouses while those that were not grown were supplied by other Palestinian farmers. Unlike in previous years, Salfit had supplied Nablus with vegetables while that city was under Israeli curfew. Part of this upsurge in agricultural activity was the cultivation of about 100 dunams of relatively isolated lands.

An Israeli military measure closed all schools in the West Bank on 3 February 1988, stating that they served to organize violence. This led to a number of "popular education committees" being established. These committees held classes in lieu of the closed-down schools. Families affiliated with the conservative Hamas movement sent their children to the mosque-based class while those leaned towards communism and secularism sent their children to a local union building. Classes held in the mosque were considered to particularly progressive because of gender integration.

The military wing of Hamas claimed it launched its first suicide attack from Salfit in 1993. The Palestinian National Authority (PNA), which began to administer the town, created the governorate of Salfit with the city as its capital in 1995. Under the Oslo Accords, the city has been placed under Palestinian civil control, what is known as Area A.

Israeli authorities published plans in 2021 to construct 730 residential units around the illegal Israeli outpost of Nof Avi, which was established in 2020 by an Israeli couple as a farm, on what Israel declares is 'state land'. The new settlement was to be called 'West Ariel'. The establishment of such a large settlement, according to Salfit residents, would effectively block their own planned urban expansion.

== Demographics ==
Historical population
Year	Pop.	±%
1922	901	—
1931	1,415	+57.0%
1945	1,830	+29.3%
1961	3,393	+85.4%
1997	7,101	+109.3%
2007	8,796	+23.9%
2017	10,911	+24.0%

During Ottoman rule, there were 118 households and two bachelors, all Muslim counted in the 1596 census.

The British Mandate authorities conducted a census in 1922, which showed a population of 901 (899 Muslims and 2 Orthodox Christians). The 1931 census counted 1415 (1412 Muslims and 3 Christians), occupying 331 homes.

In the 1945 village statistics, the population was 1830, all Muslims. Jordan conducted a census in 196, which counted the population at 3393.

According to the 1997 census by the Palestinian Central Bureau of Statistics (PCBS) the population of Salfit was 7101. Nearly 13% of the population were recorded as refugees. The gender distribution was 50.6% male and 49.4% female. Over 50% of the residents were below the age of 24, while 45% were between the ages of 25–65 and the remaining 5% were over 65. The population reached 8796 and the number of households was 1840 in the 2007 census. Males and females each constituted half of the population. The age distribution was 48.9% below the age of 20, 46.6% between ages 20–65 and 4.1% over the age of 65. Over 48% of residents over the age of 12 were married, 3.6% were widowed and less than 1% were divorced. According to the 2017 census, the population grew to 10,911.

== Economy ==
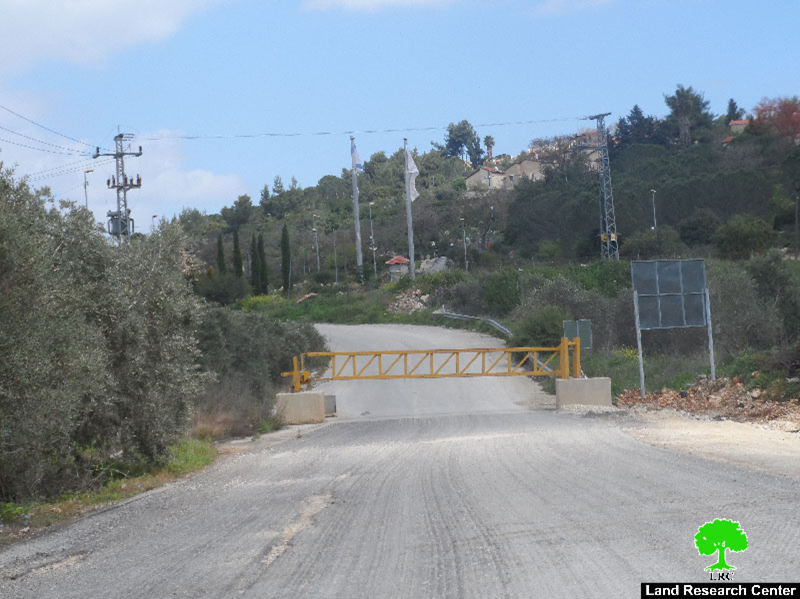
Israelis closing the entrance to Salfit, photo from June 2018.

Salfit is a major administrative and commercial center for the dozens of villages surrounding it. However, the route for Palestinians from Salfit's northern dependencies has been sealed off by the Israel Defense Forces because of a bypass road for the settlement of Ariel crossing the main road.

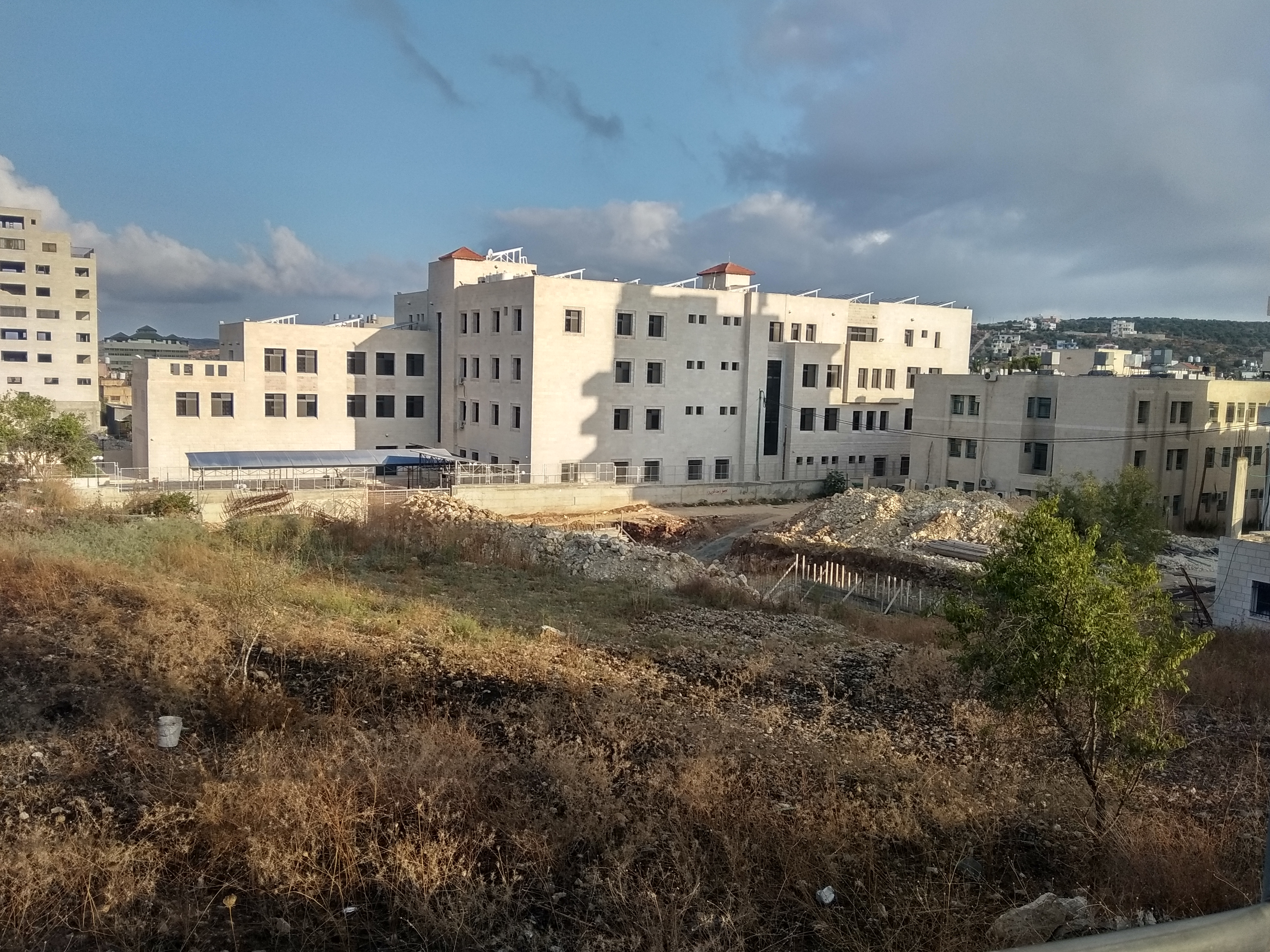
The al-Quds Open University campus in Salfit, 2018

There are several governmental offices and institutions in the city. Education services in Salfit are provided by four modern schools in addition to the Al-Quds Open University campus. The Salfit Governorate is also an area that is well known in the field of stone cutting and marble. An industrial zone was established on 200 dunams of land at the east end of Salfit.

The Salfit Governorate is the largest olive oil producer in the Palestinian territories, producing 1,500 tons annually. Zaytoun, the Palestinian Olive Tree Association, is active with Palestinian Agricultural Relief Committees (PARC) in Salfit to improve the quality and sales of Palestinian Olive oil. Salfit is located just across a valley to the south of the Israeli settlement of Ariel and around 1/3 the population of Ariel, about midway between Nablus and Ramallah.

The US Consulate General in Jerusalem presented 700 books and 100 magazines for a new library at the Community-Based Learning Center in Salfit in May 2008. The ceremony was attended by the Ministry of Youth and Sports official, Hussein Azzam, and Deputy Governor of Salfit, Nawaf Souf. The Community Center is located on al-Madares Street in Salfit and was established by the Relief International Schools Online (RISOL) in 2007.

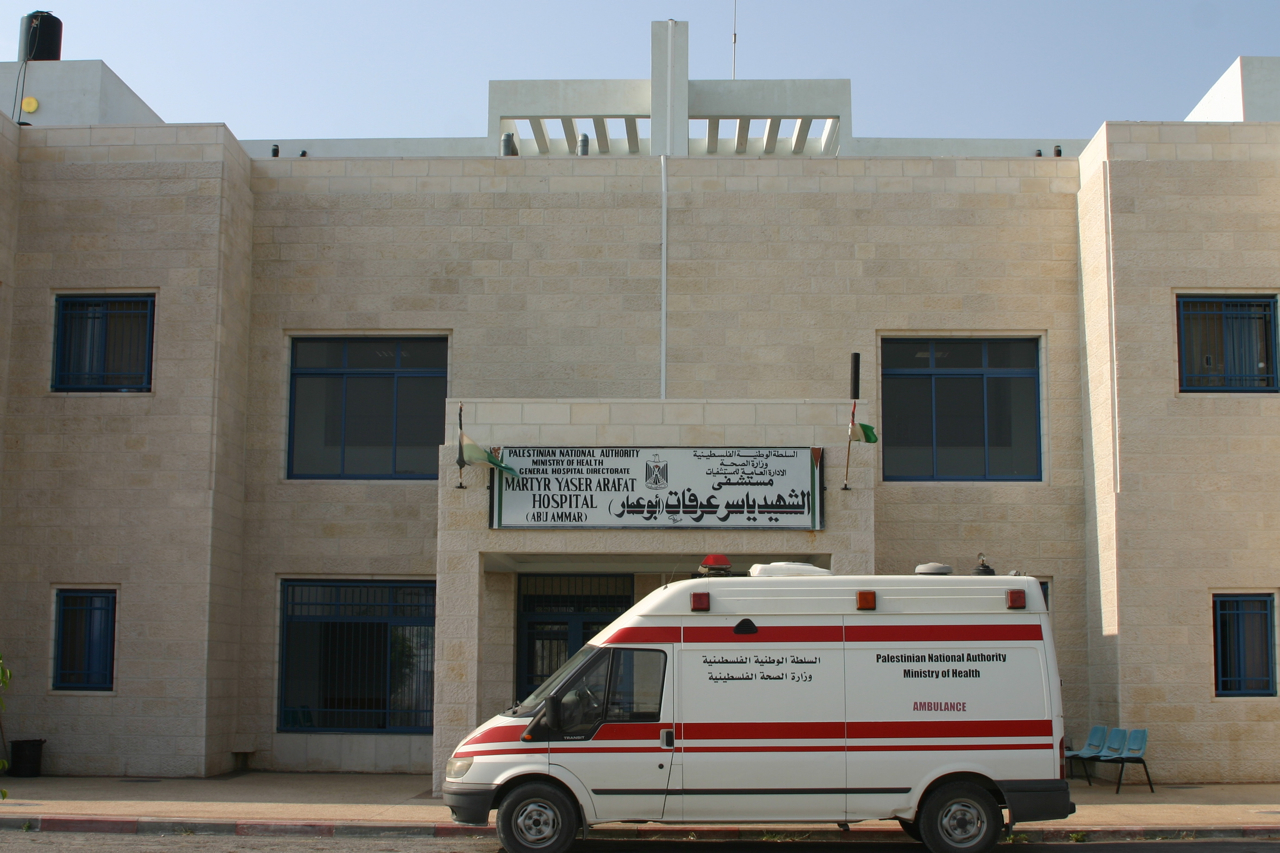
Martyr Yasser Arafat Governmental Hospital in Salfit, 2010

The Salfit Hospital was completed in 2006. Until then, the nearest hospitals were in Nablus, Tulkarm and Ramallah, all over an hour drive away.

=== Water treatment plant ===
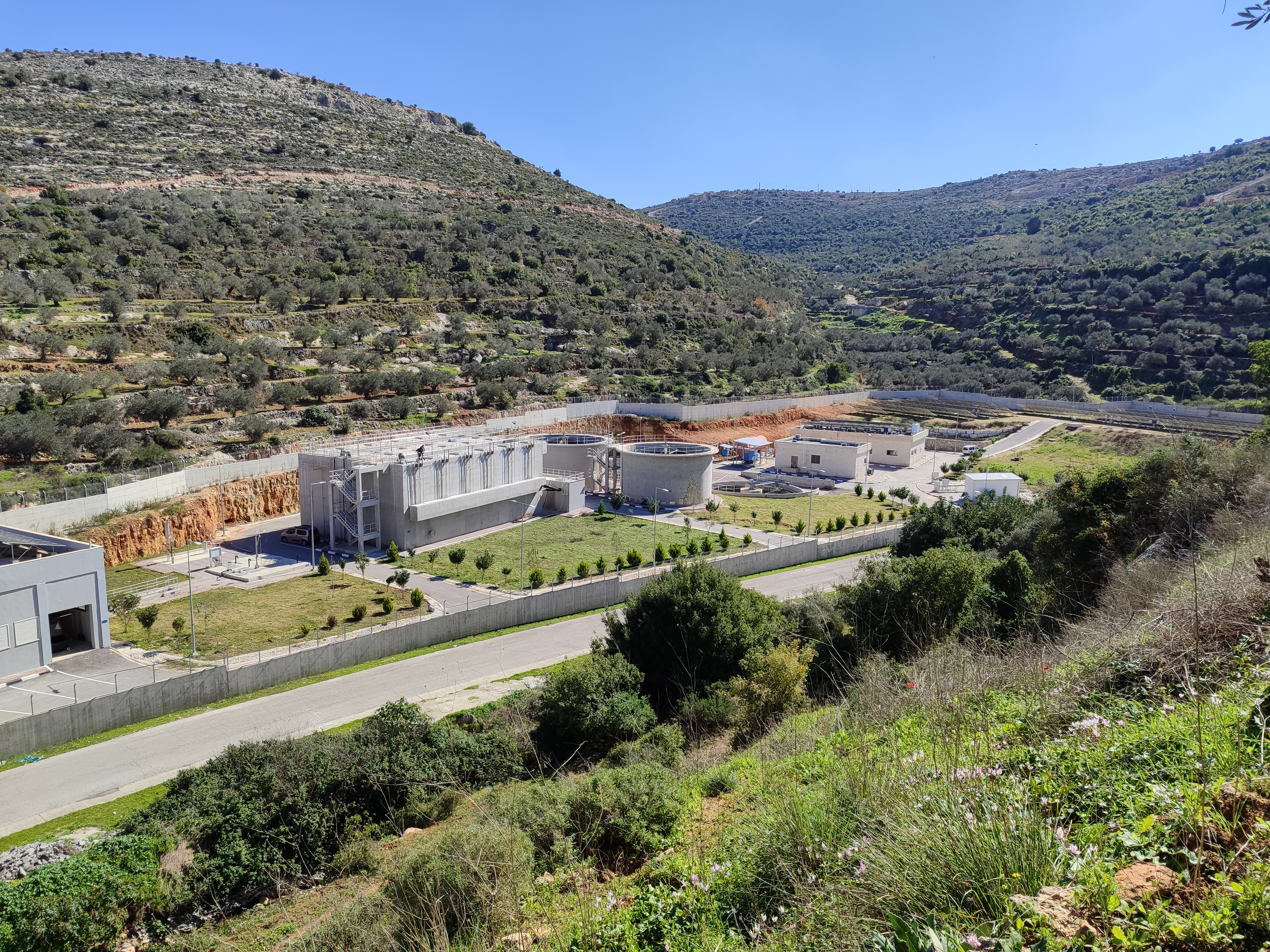
Salfit Wastewater Treatment Plant, separated from the city by the West Bank Israeli barrier, February 2024

There are a large number of water springs in and around the city, but they are unable to cope with the growing demand of the city. For the past nine years, the municipality has been trying to build a wastewater treatment plant. The House of Water and Environment (HWE) of Ramallah produced a report in July 2007, the "Assessment of the Impact of Pollution Sources on the Water Environment and the Lives of the Residents in the Northern West Bank, Palestine".

The plant was supposed to be built on Salfit Governorate land 13 kilometers (8.1 mi) from the town of Salfit. The municipality received a grant of €22 million from the German government to build the plant and a mainline pipe to the town, but the Israel Defense Forces (IDF) stopped the construction of the building and seized all the equipment, stating it would interfere with nearby Israeli settlements. The equipment was returned only 18 months later. As a result, the town had to take out a loan to buy a new piece of land eight kilometers closer to its outskirts and another loan of 2 million euros to move the pipes and the electricity cables. Although Israel approved the new site of the plant, the West Bank Barrier would separate Salfit from the sewage plant.

Salfit and other towns in the area were without running water for weeks in June 2016, as the Israeli water supply company, Mekorot reduced the amount of water it sold to the Palestinians.

== Buildings and heritage ==
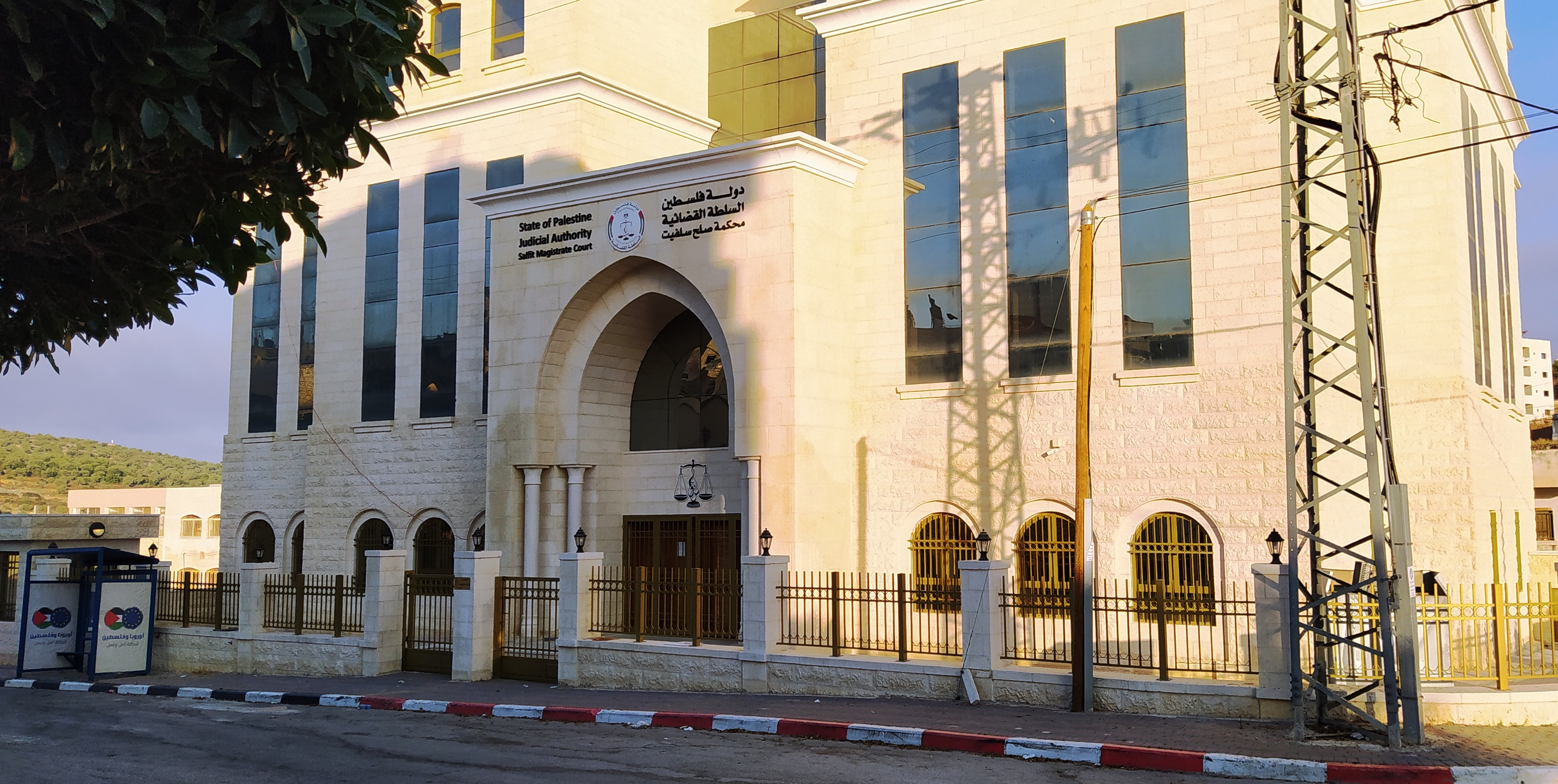
Salfit Magistrate's Court

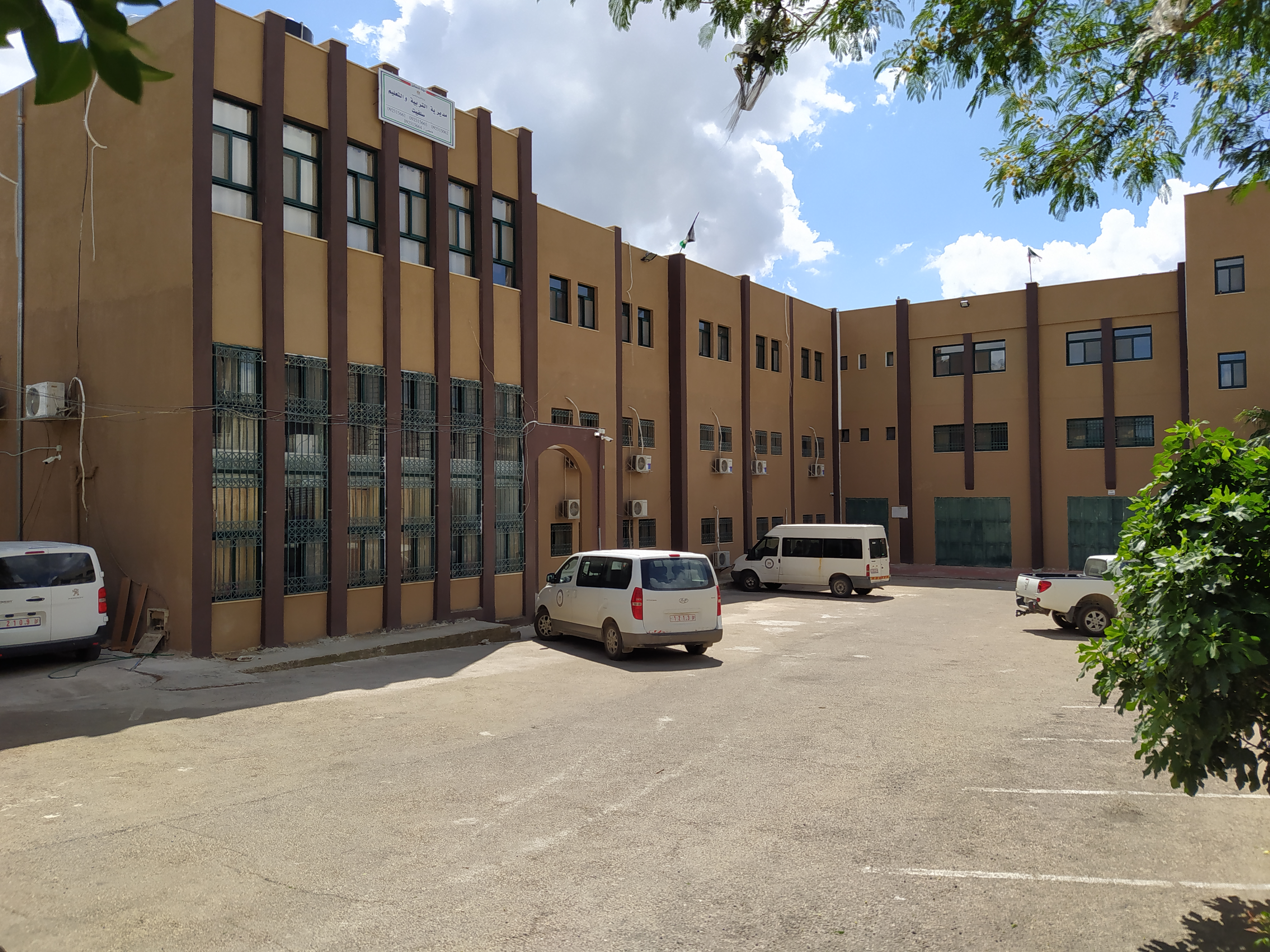
Direction of Education, Salfit

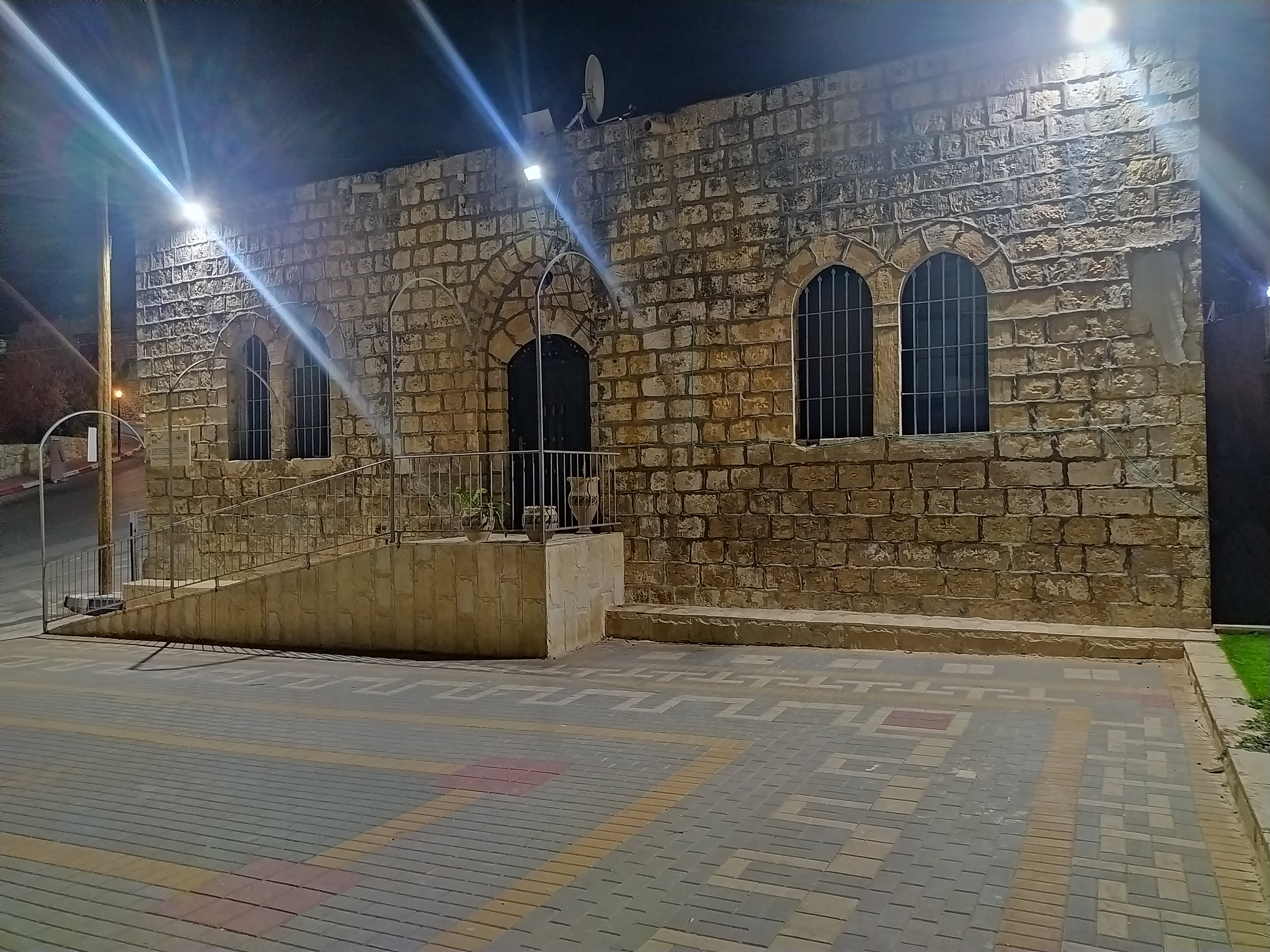
Salfit Havran Cultural Center

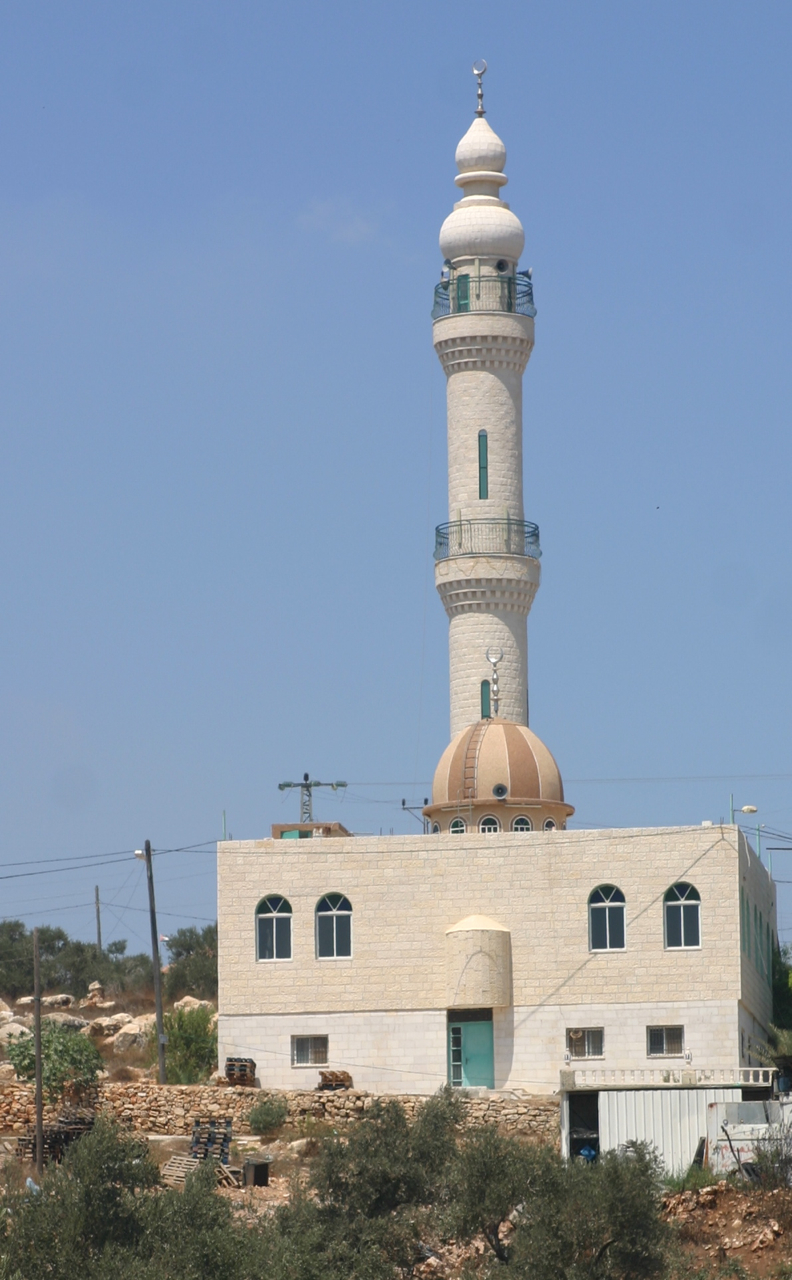
Al-Abrar Mosque, Salfit

== Notable people ==
- Zaher Jabarin, head of Hamas for the West Bank (2024-), born in Salfit in 1969
- Arabi Awwad, Founder of the Revolutionary Palestinian Communist Party, born in Salfit in 1928

== See also ==
- Palestinian enclaves
- Israeli occupation of the West Bank
- Israeli settlement
- Israeli apartheid
- West Bank Israeli barrier

== Bibliography ==
- Bardin, Hillel (2012). A Zionist among Palestinians. Indiana University Press. ISBN 978-0253002235. "Salfit Communist."
- Barron, J.B., ed. (1923). Palestine: Report and General Abstracts of the Census of 1922. Government of Palestine.
- Conder, C.R.; Kitchener, H.H. (1882). The Survey of Western Palestine: Memoirs of the Topography, Orography, Hydrography, and Archaeology. Vol. 2. London: Committee of the Palestine Exploration Fund.
- Doumani, B. (1995). Rediscovering Palestine: Merchants and Peasants in Jabal Nablus, 1700–1900. University of California Press. ISBN 978-0-520-20370-9.
- Ellenblum, R. (2003). Frankish Rural Settlement in the Latin Kingdom of Jerusalem. Cambridge University Press. ISBN 9780521521871.
- Finkelstein, I.; Lederman, Zvi, eds. (1997). Highlands of many cultures. Tel Aviv: Institute of Archaeology of Tel Aviv University Publications Section. ISBN 965-440-007-3.
- Government of Jordan, Department of Statistics (1964). First Census of Population and Housing. Volume I: Final Tables; General Characteristics of the Population (PDF).
- Government of Palestine, Department of Statistics (1945). Village Statistics, April, 1945.
- Greenberg, Ela (2010). Preparing the Mothers of Tomorrow: Education and Islam in Mandate Palestine. University of Texas Press. ISBN 978-0292721197.
- Hadawi, S. (1970). Village Statistics of 1945: A Classification of Land and Area ownership in Palestine. Palestine Liberation Organization Research Center. Archived from the original on 2018-12-08.
- Holtmann, Phillip (2009). Martyrdom, Not Suicide: The Legality of Hamas' Bombings in the Mid-1990s in Modern Islamic Jurisprudence. GRIN Verlag. ISBN 978-3640473335.
- Hütteroth, W.-D.; Abdulfattah, K. (1977). Historical Geography of Palestine, Transjordan and Southern Syria in the Late 16th Century. Erlanger Geographische Arbeiten, Sonderband 5. Erlangen, Germany: Vorstand der Fränkischen Geographischen Gesellschaft. ISBN 3-920405-41-2.
- Lockman, Zackary; Beinin, J., eds. (1989). Intifada: The Palestinian Uprising Against Israeli Occupation. Merip. ISBN 0-89608-363-2.
- Makdisi, S. (2008). Palestine inside out: an everyday occupation. New York: W.W. Norton. ISBN 9780393066067.
- Mills, E., ed. (1932). Census of Palestine 1931. Population of Villages, Towns and Administrative Areas. Jerusalem: Government of Palestine.
- Palmer, E.H. (1881). The Survey of Western Palestine: Arabic and English Name Lists Collected During the Survey by Lieutenants Conder and Kitchener, R. E. Transliterated and Explained by E.H. Palmer. Committee of the Palestine Exploration Fund.
- Robinson, E.; Smith, E. (1841). Biblical Researches in Palestine, Mount Sinai and Arabia Petraea: A Journal of Travels in the year 1838. Vol. 3. Boston: Crocker & Brewster.
- Robinson, Glenn E. (1997). Building a Palestinian State: The Incomplete Revolution. Indiana University Press. ISBN 0253210828. "Salfit Intifada."
