= Yevul =

Moshav in southern Israel

Yevul: יְבוּל (Hebrew)
- Location within Northwest Negev region of Israel Location within Israel
- Coordinates: 31°11′21″N 34°19′9″E
- Country: Israel
- District: Southern
- Subdistrict: Beersheba
- Council: Eshkol
- Affiliation: Agricultural Union
- Founded: 1981
- Population (2024): 446

Yevul (Hebrew: יְבוּל, lit. 'Crop') is a moshav in southern Israel. Located in the Hevel Shalom area of the north-western Negev desert near the Gaza Strip–Egypt border, it falls under the jurisdiction of Eshkol Regional Council. In 2024 it had a population of 446.

== History ==
The village was established in 1981 by evacuees from Sinai. In 2005, three quarters of the former residents of Netzarim who were evicted from their village due to Israel's unilateral disengagement plan moved to temporary housing in Yevul while permanent housing is to be planned in the area.

In the aftermath of the 2023 Hamas-led attack on Israel, evacuees from Yevul joined survivors of the massacre at Be'eri to take up temporary housing in a hostel near the Dead Sea.
