= Yad Binyamin =

Community settlement in central Israel

Yad Binyamin: יַד בִּנְיָמִין (Hebrew)
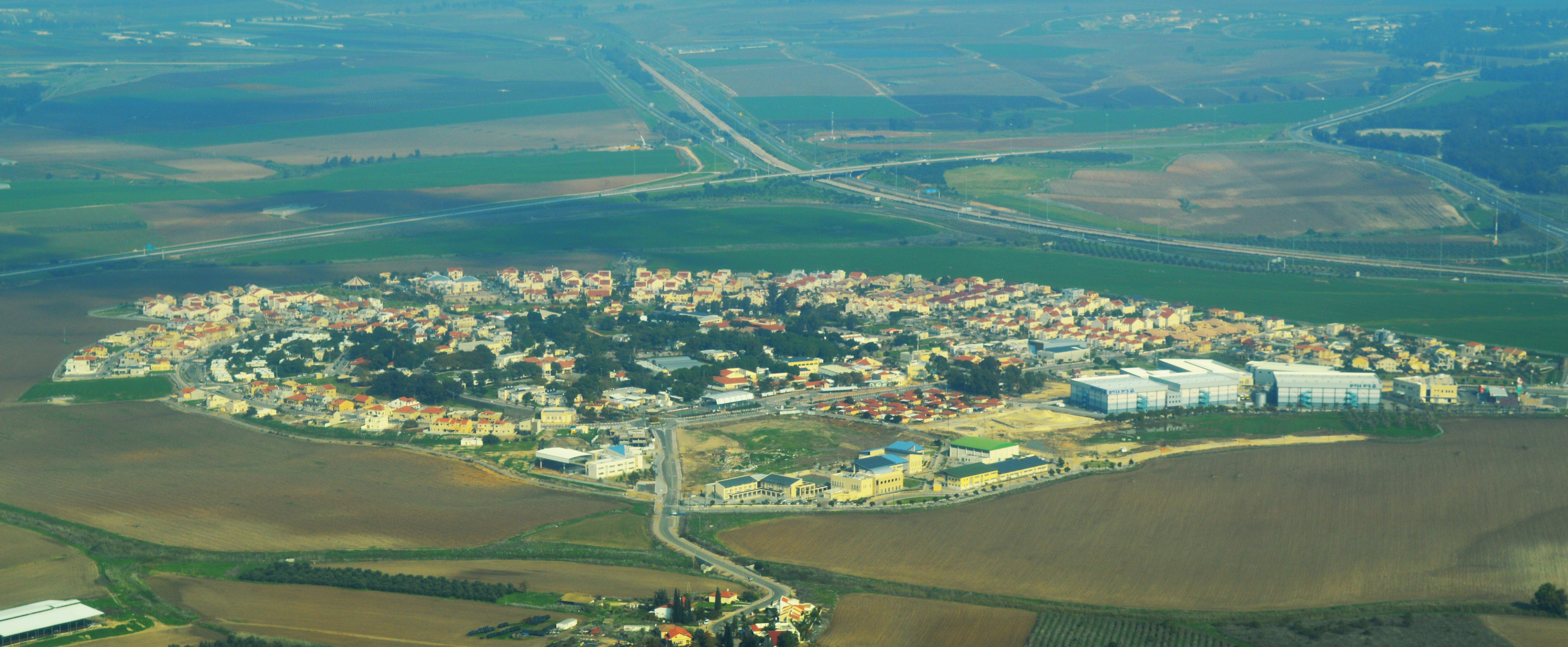
- Etymology: Binyamin Memorial
- Location within Central Israel Location within Israel
- Coordinates: 31°47′50″N 34°49′17″E
- Country: Israel
- District: Central
- Subdistrict: Rehovot
- Council: Nahal Sorek
- Founded: 1962
- Population (2024): 4,338

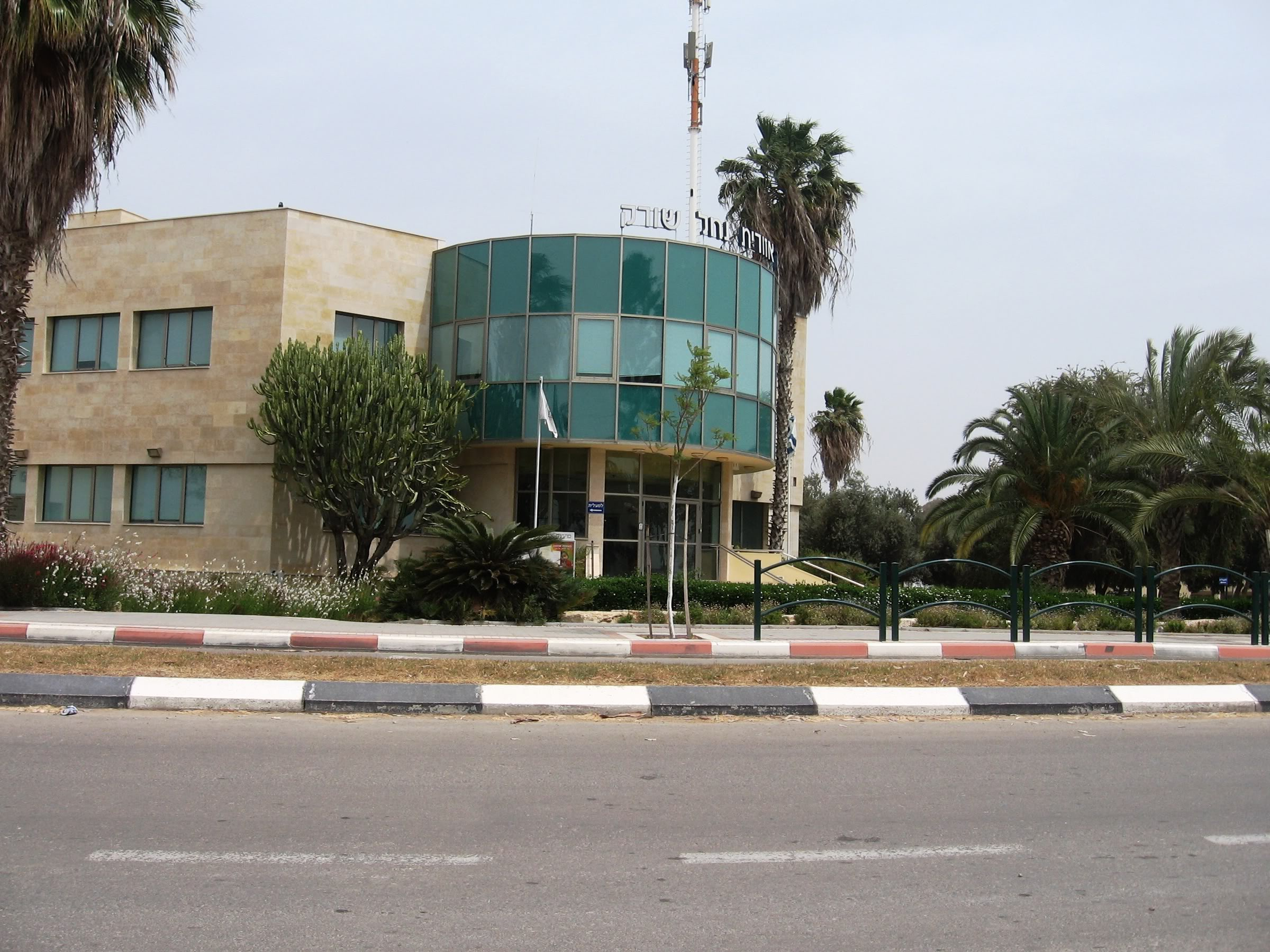
Yad Binyamin council

Yad Binyamin (Hebrew: יַד בִּנְיָמִין, lit. Binyamin Memorial) is a community settlement in central Israel. The seat of Nahal Sorek Regional Council, it is located adjacent to the junction of three major highways: Highway 3, Highway 6, and Highway 7. In 2024 it had a population of 4,338.

== History ==
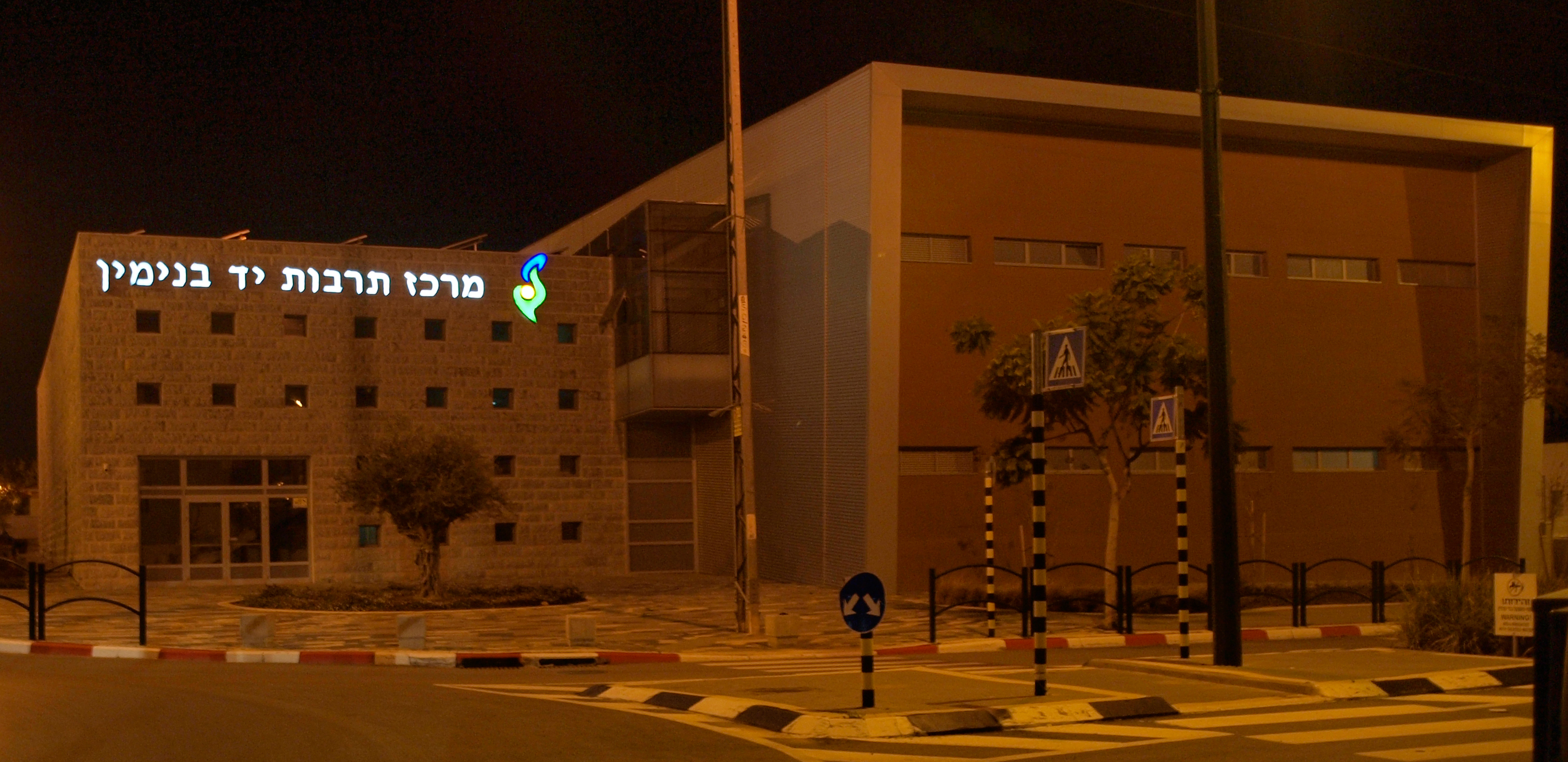
Yad Binyamin cultural center

The land had been used as a Ma'abara Nativa which was abandoned as a religious settlement and educational center in 1962 by Poalei Agudat Yisrael, in partnership with the municipality of Nahal Sorek. It was named after the former Minister of Postal Services, Binyamin Mintz, who had died the previous year. For many years, the community was a center of higher Jewish learning, based around the yeshiva.

Following the disengagement plan, around 200 families from Gush Katif moved into temporary pre-fabricated housing in Yad Binyamin. Some later moved to a new village named Ganei Tal after the former settlement by the same name. Many other families have moved to Netzer Hazani.

The community has a neighborhood, called Ahuzat Yonatan, that is for people ages 55 and older. The neighborhood has approximately 160 apartments as well as a shared building containing a synagogue.

== Transportation ==
Yad Binyamin is located 3 kilometres (1.9 mi) from the Re'em Junction on Highway 3, and one kilometer from the intersection of Highway 6 and Highway 7. In September 2018, Israel Railways opened the nearby Kiryat Malachi-Yoav station, connecting the area to the Nahariyah–Beersheba line. A number of Egged bus routes provide transport links to Jerusalem, Ashkelon, and other cities.

== Voting Patterns ==
In the 2026 election, 88 percent of voters in Yad Binyamin voted for the parties of the right-wing coalition led by Benjamin Netanyahu, while 5 percent voted for the parties of the center-left coalition led by Gadi Eisenkot. An additional 1.2 percent voted for the Reservists, and 4.5 percent voted for Amcha Yisrael. 52 percent of voters voted for the Religious Zionist Party. The Arab parties did not receive any votes. Voter turnout increased 19 percent from the 2022 election.
