= Netzer Hazani (Israeli settlement) =

Former Israeli settlement in the Gaza Strip

Netzer Hazani: נֵצֶר חַזָּנִי (Hebrew)
- Former Israeli settlement
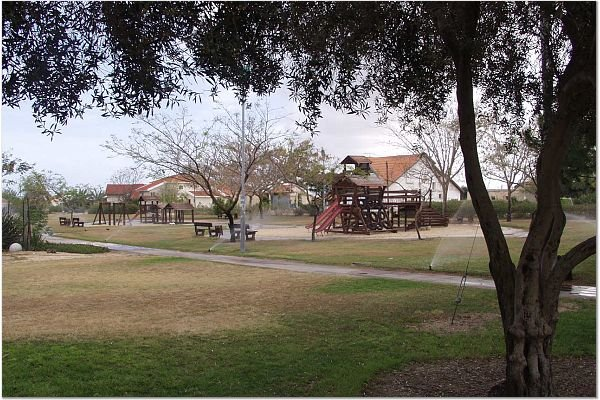

- Location within the Gaza Strip
- Coordinates: 31°22′48″N 34°19′19″E
- Country: Israel
- Council: Hof Aza
- Founded: 1997

Netzer Hazani (Hebrew: נֵצֶר חַזָּנִי) was an Israeli settlement located in the northeast corner of the Gush Katif (a bloc of 17 Israeli settlements in the southern Gaza Strip) and evacuated in Israel's disengagement of 2005. It was under the jurisdiction of Hof Aza Regional Council.

== History ==
Netzer Hazani was founded as a paramilitary Nahal (Fighting Pioneer Youth) settlement called Gadish on May 29, 1973.

In February 1977 the land was handed over to civilians as a moshav of Orthodox Jews, becoming the first civilian village of Gush Katif. The settlement was named after Michael Hazani, Minister of Social Welfare and Agriculture and one of the pioneers of the settlement movement.

On the day of the ceremony, Prime Minister Yitzhak Rabin announced, "This is a great day for the State of Israel and for Jewish settlement, a day which symbolizes our deep-rooted presence in this area, which has since the Six-Day War become an integral part of the State and its security". After the ceremony Rabin fixed the first Mezuza on the entrance to one of the houses, together with the son of minister Hazani.

== Economy ==
Most residents earned their living from agriculture. In the 1970s and 1980s, the main crop was floral, later in the 1990s, vegetables would be grown in the greenhouses. Towards the end of the 1990s, the Netzer Hazani farmers joined other farmers in Gush Katif, in growing bug-free leafy vegetables and herbs. A budding organic agriculture initiative was also successful.

== Unilateral disengagement ==
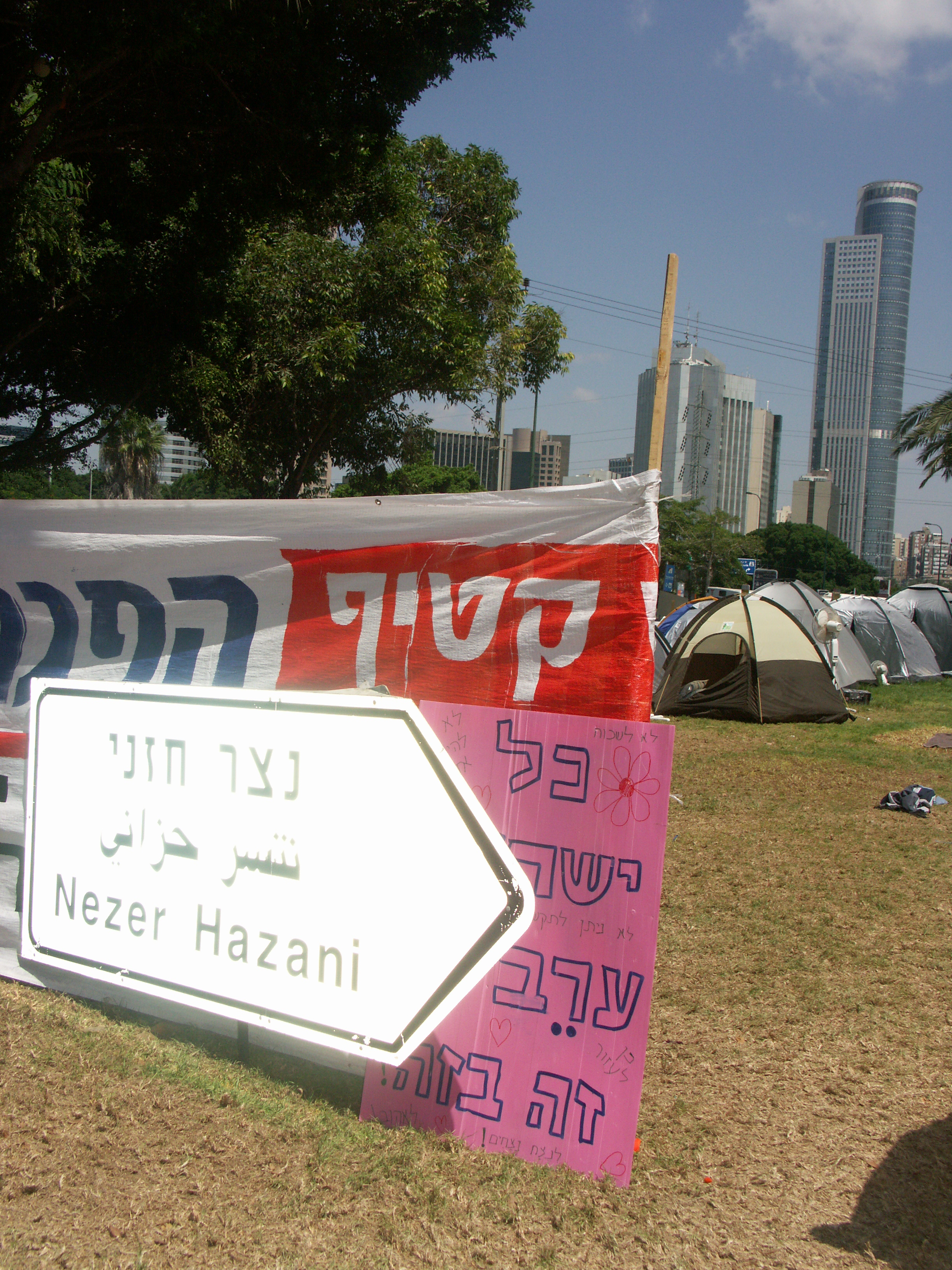
A protest camp in Tel Aviv by members of Netzer Hazani, Hof Aza left without homes

Residents of Netzer Hazani were forcefully evicted on August 18, 2005, by the IDF and Israeli Police. By that time, it was home to 84 families including over 410 people. A new village named Netzer Hazani was established in the Nahal Sorek Regional Council area of Israel in 2010.
