= Ganei Tal =

Moshav in central Israel

Ganei Tal: גני טל (Hebrew)
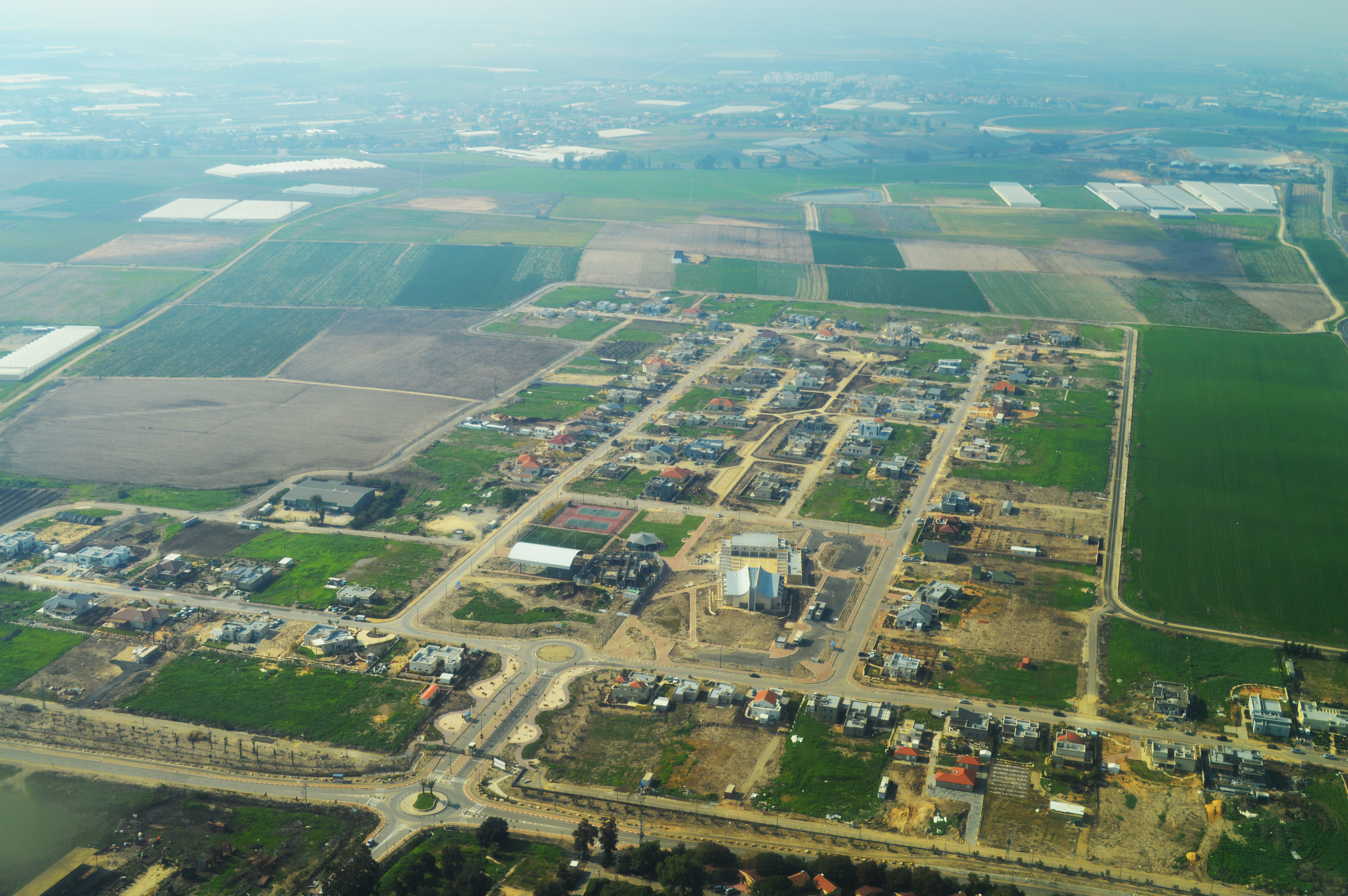
- Etymology: Gardens of Dew
- Location within Central Israel Location within Israel
- Coordinates: 31°47′19″N 34°47′32″E
- Country: Israel
- District: Central
- Subdistrict: Rehovot
- Council: Nahal Sorek
- Affiliation: Hapoel HaMizrachi
- Founded: 2010
- Founder: Former Israeli settlers
- Population (2024): 1,070

Ganei Tal (Hebrew: גני טל, lit. 'Gardens of Dew') is a moshav in central Israel. Located to the south of Gedera, it falls under the jurisdiction of Nahal Sorek Regional Council. In 2024 it had a population of 1,070.

== History ==
The village was established in 2010 by former settlers who had been removed from the Gaza Strip as a result of the disengagement plan and who had been temporarily housed in Yad Binyamin. Built next to Hafetz Haim, it was named after the former settlement of the same name.
