= Dov Weissglas =

Israeli lawyer and businessman (born 1946)

- דב ויסגלס
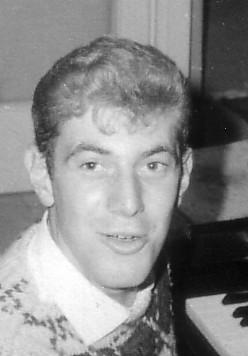
- Weissglas in 1965
- Born: 4 October 1946 (age 79)
- Education: Hebrew University of Jerusalem
- Occupation: Lawyer

Dov Weissglas (Hebrew: דב ויסגלס; born 4 October 1946) is an Israeli lawyer and businessman who was involved in the Middle East peace process during the term of Prime Minister Ariel Sharon.

== Biography ==
Dov Weissglas was born in Tel Aviv to an affluent family and grew up in Ramat Gan. After graduating from the Ohel Shem high school, he served in the Israel Defense Forces and began studying law at the Hebrew University of Jerusalem at age 19.

He's married to Louise Weissglas with whom he has 3 daughters.

== Legal career ==
After graduating with an LLB and interning at the Tel Aviv District Court, he received a law license in 1971. That same year, he began working at the Tel Aviv law firm Moritz & Margolis. In 1978, he became a partner in the firm, and together with Amir Almagor, he acquired the firm in 1984, becoming a senior partner. The firm subsequently became Moritz, Weissglas, Almagor & Co.

As a lawyer, he represented numerous Israeli public figures in court, often in libel suits against newspapers. His clients included Yitzhak Rabin, Ariel Sharon, Ehud Olmert, Yisrael Meir Lau, Avigdor Lieberman, and Effie Eitam. He represented two Shin Bet officers tasked with monitoring Jewish extremists before the Shamgar Commission, two Mossad agents captured in Jordan during a failed operation to assassinate Khalid Mashal, the locomotive driver in the HaBonim disaster, the chairman of the organizing committee of the Maccabiah Games in the aftermath of the Maccabiah bridge collapse, and Rafi Eitan before the US authorities in the Jonathan Pollard affair. He did military reserve duty in the Office of the Legal Advisor of the Ministry of Defense, where he assisted in collecting material for the Kahan Commission. He was also the licensed manager of the Hessna insurance company in 1991.

Weisglas met Ariel Sharon in 1982, when he was working in the legal department of the Defense Ministry. He prepared the statement delivered by Sharon to the committee of inquiry investigating the Sabra and Shatila massacre. Eventually, Weissglas became Sharon's personal attorney.

In 2002, Weissglas was appointed Prime Minister's Ariel Sharon' head of bureau, serving until August 2004. In this role, he served as a diplomatic delegate for negotiating with U.S. National Security Advisor Condoleezza Rice and U.S. Secretary of State Colin Powell, and was one of the key architects of the Israeli disengagement from Gaza.

He continued to act as a special adviser to the Prime Minister for the rest of Sharon's term, and he remained in this role under Prime Minister Ehud Olmert after Sharon's stroke.

In 2009, he briefly served as an adviser to Prime Minister Benjamin Netanyahu.

== Business career ==
In June 2006, Weissglas was appointed chairman of the Board of Directors of Bezeq. He retired after a year and three months and received the highest retirement bonus given to a retiring chairman at that time.

== Published works ==
Ariel Sharon – A Prime Minister, 2012, Yedioth Ahronoth Books

== Controversy ==
In 2004, he was criticized for saying that the disengagement plan was like formaldehyde: It supplies the amount of formaldehyde that's necessary so that there will not be a political process with the Palestinians.". In September 2009, Weissglas said that Israel has no choice but to evacuate all the settlements because there is no country in the world that recognizes Israel’s right to the territory and that without the help of the world, Israel will be a third world country. He was quoted as saying: “After we have returned the Gaza Strip, we will sooner or later return all the territories and all the settlers will leave to the last of them.”.
