= Israeli disengagement from the Gaza Strip =

2005 Israeli government initiative

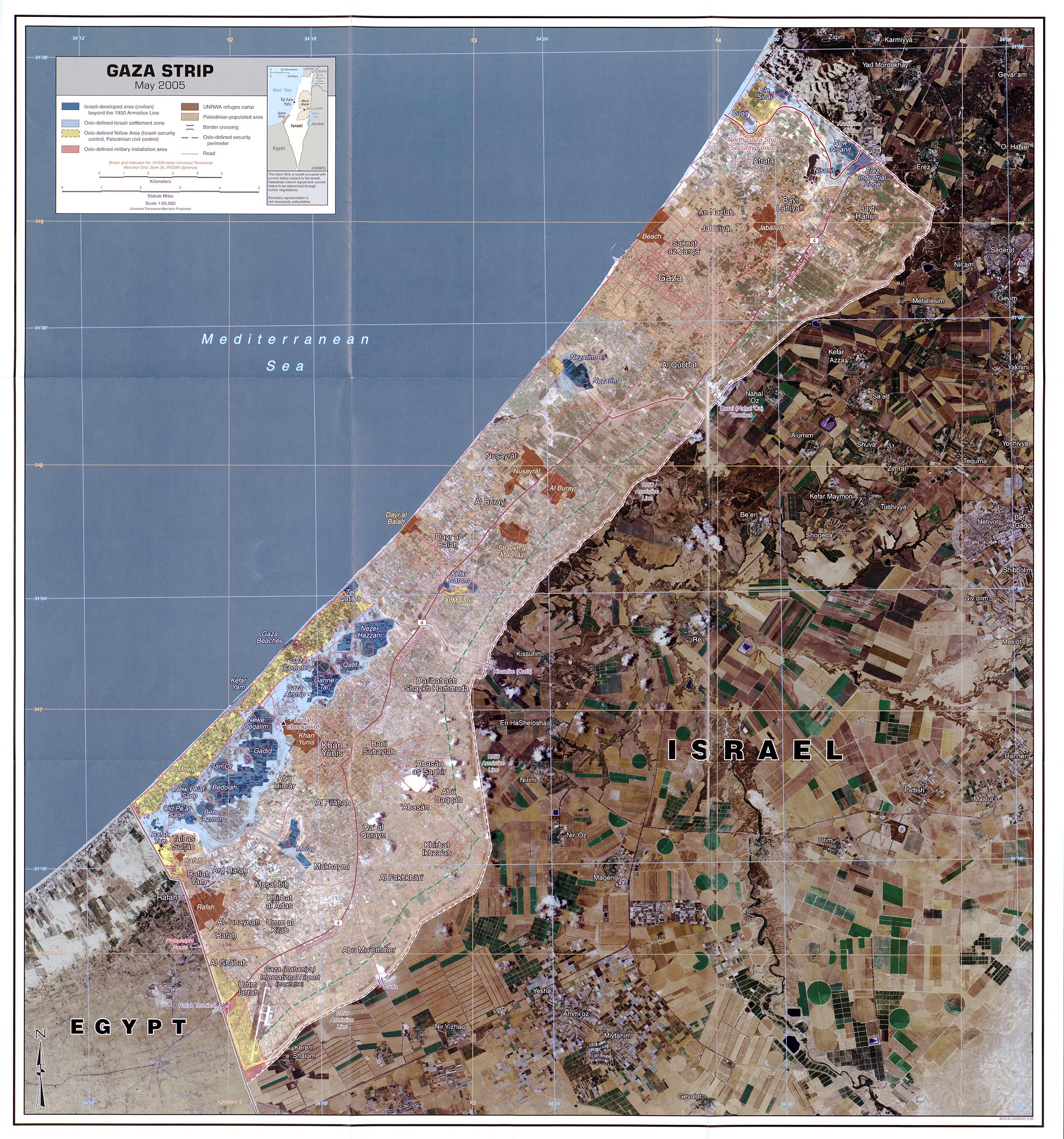
Map of the Gaza Strip in May 2005, a few months prior to the Israeli disengagement, with major Israeli settlements marked as the blue-shaded regions.

In 2005, following the Second Intifada (2000–05), Israel withdrew its forces from the Gaza Strip and dismantled and evacuated the 21 settlements it built there during its occupation of the territory (1967–2005). Israel withdrew its ground forces from inside Gaza but retained control over its airspace and territorial waters and continued to restrict the movement of people and goods through its blockade and control of most crossings. Due to these continuing controls, the Gaza Strip has continued to be regarded by the United Nations, many international humanitarian and legal organizations, and most academic commentators as being under Israeli occupation, as affirmed by the 2024 International Court of Justice advisory opinion. Israel disputes this interpretation, arguing that its 2005 withdrawal ended the occupation. Historically, according to Article 42 of the Hague Regulations and precedent in international law, it has been generally understood that a territory remains effectively occupied so long as a belligerent's authority is established and exercised over it, even if said belligerent does not have ground forces deployed in the area.

Proposed by Israeli prime minister Ariel Sharon in 2003 and adopted by the Cabinet in 2004, the strategy was officially approved by the Knesset as the Disengagement Plan Implementation Law in June 2004. A deadline was issued for August 15, 2005, after which the IDF began evicting all Israeli settlers who were refusing to accept government compensation packages in exchange for voluntarily vacating their homes in the Gaza Strip. By September 12, all Israeli residential buildings in the territory had been demolished and the 8,000+ Israeli settlers who inhabited them had been removed. The dismantlement of the four West Bank settlements was completed ten days later.

The disengagement was executed unilaterally by Israel and without coordination with the Palestinian National Authority (PNA). Yet among Palestinians in the Gaza Strip, the disengagement was met positively in light of earlier skepticism surrounding Israel's intention to withdraw from the territory. Among Israelis, polls showed support for the disengagement in the 50–60% range and opposition in the 30–40% range. The IDF met heavy resistance and riots while conducting evictions throughout the Gaza Strip settlements. Former and future Israeli prime minister Benjamin Netanyahu resigned from Sharon's government in protest.

The Gaza Strip disengagement occurred seven months after the Sharm el-Sheikh Summit, which ended the Second Intifada. As part of this process, four Israeli settlements in the West Bank were dismantled as well. Israeli officials, historians, and legal analysts cited several motives behind the country's decision to withdraw from the territory, with the two most significant factors being: the unsustainable cost of persistent and intensive fighting with Hamas and other Palestinian militant organizations; and demographic concerns rooted in the discrepancy between the Israeli birth rate and the Palestinian birth rate, as the latter greatly outpaced the former. According to Sharon, the disengagement plan was aimed at addressing Israel's long-term security challenges by shifting the country's resources to focus on strengthening the areas that "will constitute an inseparable part of the State of Israel in any future agreement" with the Palestinians.

== Background ==
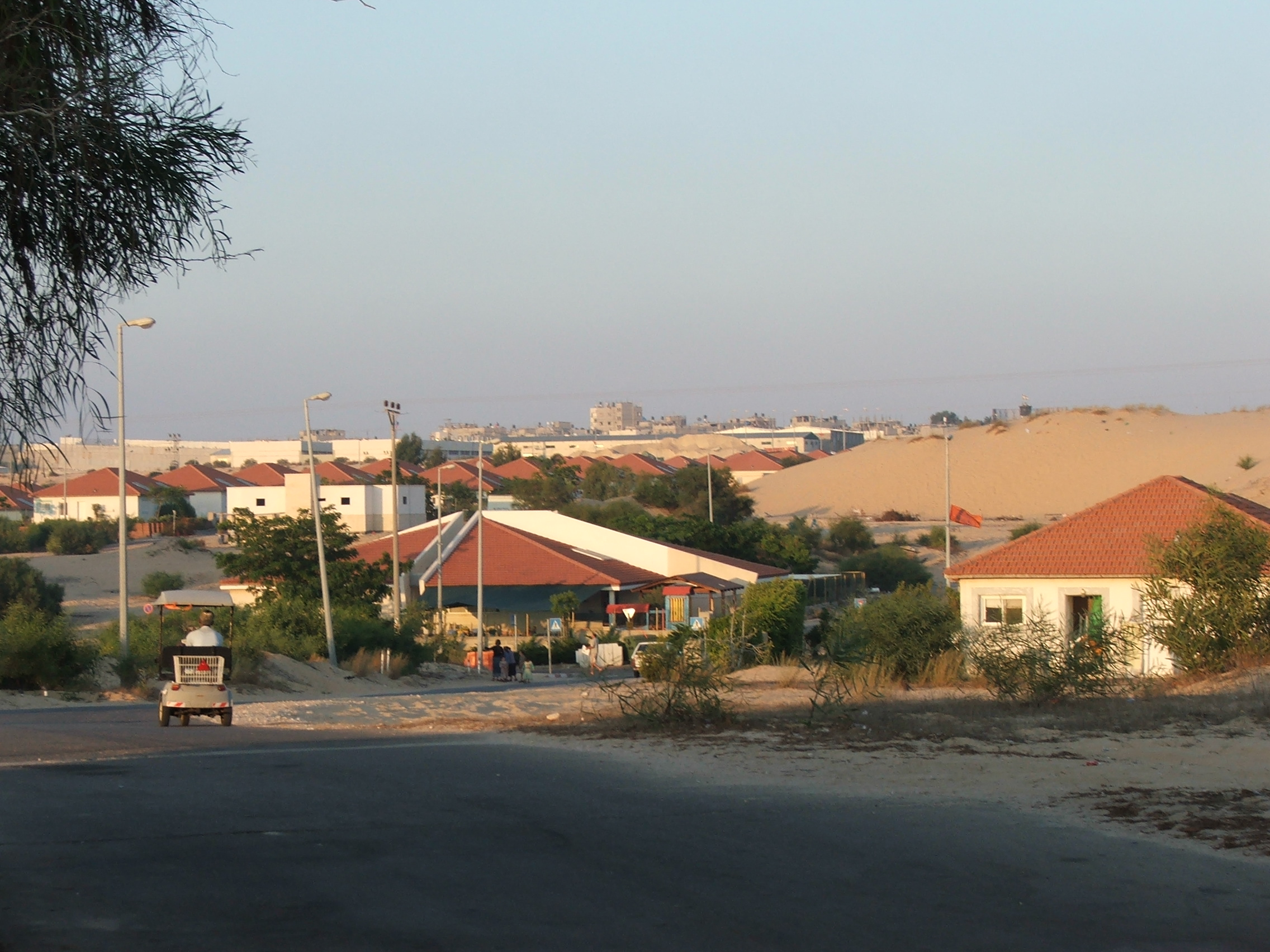
Villas of Neve Dekalim settlement, in July 2005.

Israel's occupation of the Gaza Strip began during the 1967 Arab–Israeli War, when it captured the Egyptian-occupied territory alongside the Sinai Peninsula, which was later returned as part of the Egypt–Israel peace treaty. In 1970, the first Israeli settlement was built in the Gaza Strip. In 1993, as part of the Oslo Accords, Israel and the Palestine Liberation Organization (PLO) agreed upon an outline for the latter to begin independently governing the Palestinian territories. In 1994, Israel withdrew from Gaza City and Jericho, giving civilian and city functions to the PNA. However, the outbreak of the Second Intifada in 2000 halted negotiations for the peace process.

Israeli historian Avi Shlaim writes that Hamas' persistent attacks in the Gaza Strip had increased the cost of maintaining an Israeli presence in the territory to the point of unsustainability. He says that the withdrawal aimed to undermine the Oslo Accords by freezing the political process and indefinitely delaying discussions about a Palestinian state. Additionally, demographic concerns played a key role; Shlaim states that the high Palestinian birth rate posed a "demographic time bomb" for the Israeli government, as it threatened the Jewish majority in the areas that were claimed by the country. Therefore, a complete withdrawal from the Gaza Strip meant that the territory's 1.4+ million Palestinians were no longer a concern in Israel's demographic considerations. Shlaim writes that although Sharon stated that the move was a contribution to peace, it was a unilateral decision that chiefly served Israel's national interests and was not intended as a prelude to further withdrawals or genuine peace efforts.

== Rationale and development of the policy ==
According to Ilias Bantekas and Safaa S. Jaber, "the human rights (HR) obligations inherent in the occupation, made it financially, politically, and morally costly for Israel" as an occupying power.

In his book Sharon: The Life of a Leader, Israeli prime minister Ariel Sharon's son Gilad wrote that he gave his father the idea of the disengagement. Sharon had originally dubbed his unilateral disengagement plan the "separation plan" or Tokhnit HaHafrada, before realizing that, "separation sounded bad, particularly in English, because it evoked apartheid."

In an interview from November 2003, Ehud Olmert, the deputy leader to Sharon, who had been subtly suggesting a unilateral approach for a couple of months, elaborated on his evolving policy. He expressed his certainty that the Israeli government would soon need to seriously and decisively address the "demographic issue". He believed this issue would be the primary determinant of the solution they would have to adopt. He observed that an increasing number of Palestinians wanted to move from a fight against occupation to a fight for "one-man-one-vote". However, according to Olmert, for Israelis, it would signify the end of the Jewish state. The parameters of a unilateral solution as described by Olmert would be to maximize the Jewish population, minimize the Palestinian population, avoid withdrawing to the 1967 border, and not divide Jerusalem. He recalled that Moshe Dayan had proposed unilateral autonomy 23 years ago. Similarly, he expressed the need to consider unilateral separation, which would likely prevent dialogue with the Palestinians for at least 25 years.

Sharon suggested his disengagement plan for the first time on December 18, 2003, at the Fourth Herzliya Conference. In his address to the Conference, Sharon stated that "settlements which will be relocated are those which will not be included in the territory of the State of Israel in the framework of any possible future permanent agreement. At the same time, in the framework of the Disengagement Plan, Israel will strengthen its control over those same areas in the Land of Israel which will constitute an inseparable part of the State of Israel in any future agreement." It was at this time that he began to use the word "occupation". Bernard Avishai states that the Gaza withdrawal was designed to obviate rather than facilitate peace negotiations: Sharon envisaged at the same time annexing Jerusalem, the Jordan Valley, and the major settlements like Ma'ale Adumim and Ariel which he had in the meantime developed, and thereby isolate Palestinians on the West Bank in territory that constituted less than half of what existed beyond the Green Line.

Sharon formally announced the plan in his April 14, 2004, letter to U.S. President George W. Bush, stating that "there exists no Palestinian partner with whom to advance peacefully toward a settlement".

On June 6, 2004, Sharon's government approved an amended disengagement plan, but with the reservation that the dismantling of each settlement should be voted separately. On October 11, at the opening of the Knesset winter session, Sharon outlined his plan to start legislation for the disengagement at the beginning of November, and on October 26, the Knesset gave its preliminary approval. On February 16, 2005, the Knesset finalized and approved the plan.

In October 2004, Prime Minister Ariel Sharon's senior adviser, Dov Weissglass, explained the meaning of Sharon's statement further:

The significance of the disengagement plan is the freezing of the peace process, and when you freeze that process, you prevent the establishment of a Palestinian state, and you prevent a discussion on the refugees, the borders and Jerusalem. Effectively, this whole package called the Palestinian state, with all that it entails, has been removed indefinitely from our agenda. And all this with authority and permission. All with a presidential blessing and the ratification of both houses of Congress. That is exactly what happened. You know, the term 'peace process' is a bundle of concepts and commitments. The peace process is the establishment of a Palestinian state with all the security risks that entails. The peace process is the evacuation of settlements, it's the return of refugees, it's the partition of Jerusalem. And all that has now been frozen.... what I effectively agreed to with the Americans was that part of the settlements would not be dealt with at all, and the rest will not be dealt with until the Palestinians turn into Finns. That is the significance of what we did.

Demographic concerns, the maintenance of a Jewish majority in Israeli-controlled areas, played a significant role in the development of the policy.

The rationale for the disengagement has been partly attributed to Arnon Soffer's campaign regarding "the danger the Palestinian womb posed to Israeli democracy." Sharon mentioned the demographic rationale in a public address on August 15, 2005, the day of the disengagement, as follows: "It is no secret that, like many others, I had believed and hoped we could forever hold onto Netzarim and Kfar Darom. But the changing reality in the country, in the region, and the world, required of me a reassessment and change of positions. We cannot hold on to Gaza forever. More than a million Palestinians live there and double their number with each generation." At the same time, Shimon Peres, then Vice Prime Minister, stated in an interview that: "We are disengaging from Gaza because of demography".

Continued control of Gaza was considered to pose an impossible dilemma with respect to Israel's ability to be a Jewish and democratic state in all the territories it controls.

== Political approval process ==
Failing to gain public support from senior ministers, Sharon agreed that the Likud party would hold a referendum on the plan in advance of a vote by the Israeli Cabinet. The referendum was held on May 2, 2004, and ended with 65% of the voters against the disengagement plan, despite some polls showing approximately 55% of Likud members supporting the plan before the referendum. Commentators and the press described the rejection of the plan as a blow to Sharon. Sharon himself announced that he accepted the Likud referendum results and would take time to consider his steps. He ordered Minister of Defense Shaul Mofaz to create an amended plan which Likud voters could accept.

On June 6, 2004, Sharon's government approved an amended disengagement plan, but with the reservation that the dismantling of each settlement should be voted separately. The plan was approved with a 14–7 majority but only after the National Union ministers and cabinet members Avigdor Liberman and Binyamin Elon were dismissed from the cabinet, and a compromise offer by Likud's cabinet member Tzipi Livni was achieved.

Following the approval of the plan, it was decided to close the Erez industrial zone and move its factories to cities and towns in Israel such as Ashkelon, Dimona, Yeruham, and Sderot. Ehud Olmert, then the Minister of Industry, Trade, and Labor, stated that the closing was part of Israel's plan to withdraw from the Gaza Strip.

As a result of the passing of the plan (in principle), two National Religious Party (NRP) ministers, Effi Eitam and Yitzhak Levi, resigned, leaving the government with a minority in the Knesset. Later, the entire faction quit after their calls to hold a national referendum were ignored.

Sharon's pushing through this plan alienated many of his supporters on the right and garnered him unusual support from the left-wing in Israel. The right believes that Sharon ignored the mandate he had been elected on, and instead adopted the platform of his Labor opponent, Amram Mitzna, who was overwhelmingly defeated when he campaigned on a disengagement plan of far smaller magnitude. At that time, Sharon referred to Gaza communities such as Netzarim as "no different than Tel Aviv", and said that they are of such strategic value that "the fate of Netzarim is the fate of Tel Aviv."

Many on both sides remained skeptical of his will to withdraw beyond Gaza and the northern West Bank. Sharon had a majority for the plan in the government but not within his party. This forced him to seek a National Unity government, which was established in January 2005. Opponents of the plan, and some ministers, such as Benjamin Netanyahu and former minister Natan Sharansky, called on Sharon to hold a national referendum to prove that he had a mandate, which he refused to do.

On September 14, the Israeli cabinet approved, by a 9–1 majority, plans to compensate settlers who left the Gaza Strip, with only the NRP's Zevulun Orlev opposing. The government's plan for compensation used a formula that based actual amounts on location, house size, and number of family members among other factors. Most families were expected to receive between US$200,000 and 300,000.

On October 11, at the opening of the Knesset winter session, Sharon outlined his plan to start legislation for the disengagement in the beginning of November. In a symbolic act, the Knesset voted 53–44 against Sharon's address: Labor voted against, while the National Religious Party and ten members of Likud refused to support Sharon in the vote.

On October 26, the Knesset gave preliminary approval for the plan with 67 for, 45 against, seven abstentions, and one member absent. Netanyahu and three other cabinet ministers from Sharon's ruling Likud government threatened to resign unless Sharon agreed to hold a national referendum on the plan within fourteen days.

On November 9, Netanyahu withdrew his resignation threat, saying "In this new situation [the death of Yasser Arafat], I decided to stay in the government". Following the vote fourteen days earlier, and Sharon's subsequent refusal to budge on the referendum issue, the three other cabinet ministers from the Likud party backed down from their threat within days.

On December 30, Sharon made a deal with the Labor Party to form a coalition, with Shimon Peres becoming Vice Premier, restoring the government's majority in the Knesset.

On February 16, 2005, the Knesset finalized and approved the plan with 59 in favor, 40 opposed, 5 abstaining. A proposed amendment to submit the plan to a referendum was rejected, 29–72.

On March 17, the Southern Command of the Israel Defense Forces issued a military order prohibiting Israeli citizens not living in the Gaza Strip settlements from taking up residence there.

On March 28, the Knesset again rejected a bill to delay the implementation of the disengagement plan by a vote of 72 to 39. The bill was introduced by a group of Likud MKs who wanted to force a referendum on the issue.

On August 7, Netanyahu resigned just before the cabinet ratification of the first phase of the disengagement plan by a vote of 17 to 5. Netanyahu blamed the Israeli government for moving "blindly along" with the disengagement by not taking into account the expected upsurge in terrorism.

On August 10, in his first speech before the Knesset following his resignation, Netanyahu spoke of the necessity for Knesset members to oppose the proposed disengagement:

Only we in the Knesset are able to stop this evil. Everything that the Knesset has decided, it is also capable of changing. I am calling on all those who grasp the danger: Gather strength and do the right thing. I don't know if the entire move can be stopped, but it still might be stopped in its initial stages. [Don't] give [the Palestinians] guns, don't give them rockets, don't give them a sea port, and don't give them a huge base for terror.

On August 15, Sharon said that, while he had hoped Israel could keep the Gaza settlements forever, reality simply intervened. "It is out of strength and not weakness that we are taking this step", repeating his argument that the disengagement plan has given Israel the diplomatic initiative.

On August 31, the Knesset voted to withdraw from the Gaza–Egypt border and allow Egyptian deployment of border police along the demilitarized Egyptian side of the border, revising the previously stated intent to maintain Israeli control of the border.

== Description of the plan ==
The Gaza Strip contained 21 civilian Israeli settlements and the area evacuated in the West Bank contained four, as follows:

In the Gaza Strip (21 settlements):
- Bedolah
- Bnei Atzmon (Atzmona)
- Dugit
- Elei Sinai
- Gadid
- Gan Or
- Ganei Tal
- Katif
- Kfar Darom
- Kfar Yam
- Kerem Atzmona
- Morag
- Neve Dekalim
- Netzarim
- Netzer Hazani
- Nisanit
- Pe'at Sadeh
- Rafiah Yam
- Slav
- Shirat Hayam
- Tel Katifa
In the West Bank (4 settlements):
- Kadim
- Ganim
- Homesh
- Sa-Nur

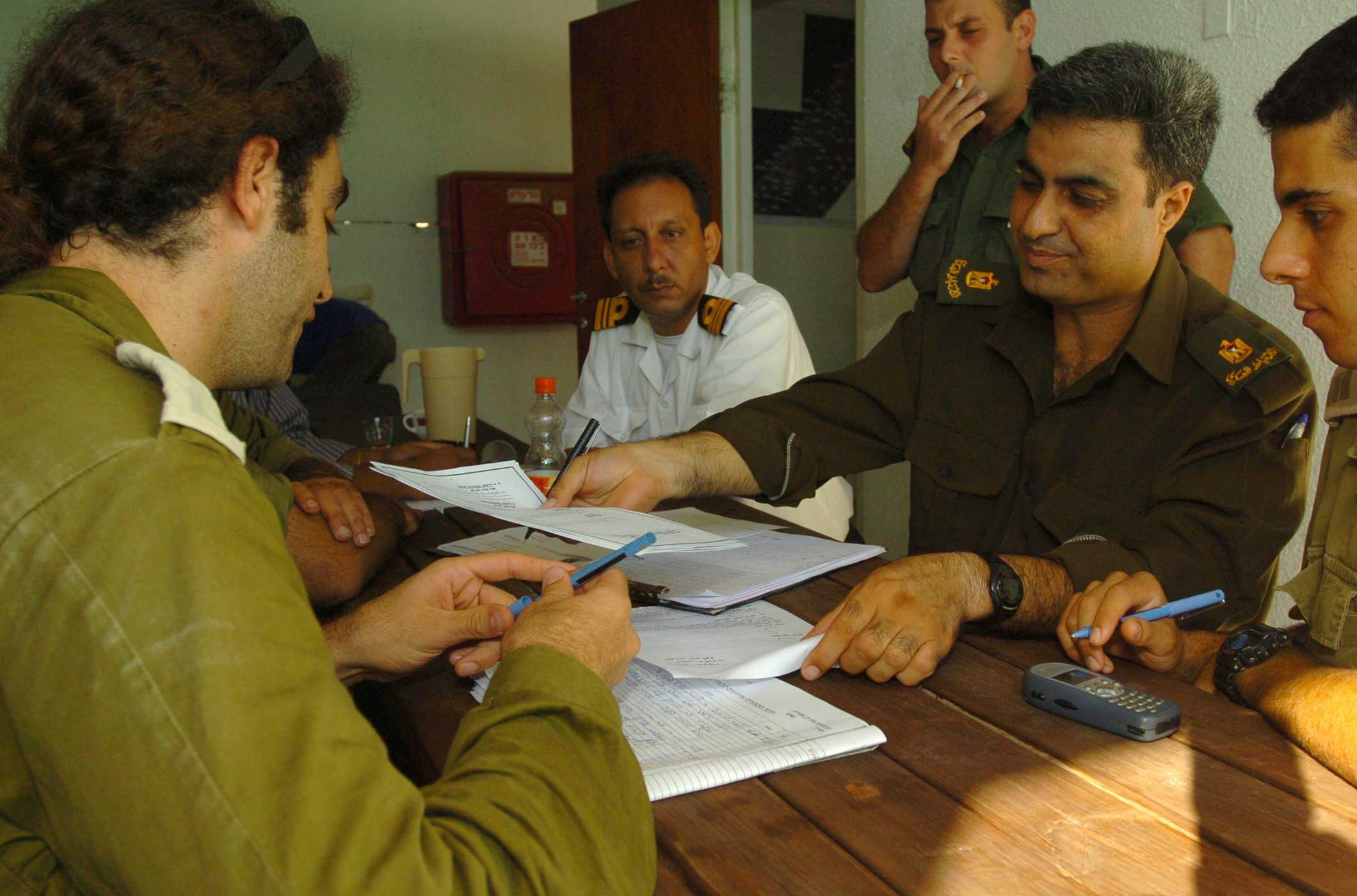
Israeli–Palestinian coordination effort, 2005

Hermesh and Mevo Dotan in the northwestern West Bank were included in the original disengagement plans, but were dropped from the plans in March.

Sharon said that his plan was designed to improve Israel's security and international status in the absence of political negotiations to end the Israeli–Palestinian conflict. About nine thousand Israeli residents within Gaza were instructed to leave the area or face eviction by the night of Tuesday, August 16, 2005. Settlers were offered compensation to move voluntarily, which about two-thirds accepted.

Under the Revised Disengagement Plan adopted on June 6, 2004, the IDF was to have remained on the Gaza–Egypt border and could have engaged in further house demolitions to widen a 'buffer zone' there (Art 6). However, Israel later decided to leave the border area, which is now controlled by Egypt and the Palestinians, through the PNA. Israel will continue to control Gaza's coastline and airspace and reserves the right to undertake military operations when necessary. (Art 3.1). Egypt will control Gaza's Egyptian border. Israel will continue to provide Gaza with water, communication, electricity, and sewage networks. The agreements brokered, according to Condoleezza Rice, proposed that Palestinians have control over exits and entrances, trucks and buses move between Gaza and the West Bank, Palestinians establish seaport and airport. This plan did not come to pass. Israel and Egypt have concluded an agreement under which Egypt can increase the number of police on its side of the border, while the IDF evacuates the Gazan side. The text of the agreement is not yet public. The estimated cost of Israel's disengagement is around $2 billion.

Because the Palestinian Authority in Gaza did not believe it had sufficient control of the area at this time, observers such as Human Rights Watch and legal experts have argued that the disengagement will not end Israel's legal responsibility as an occupying power in Gaza.

== Execution of the plan ==
=== Gaza Strip ===
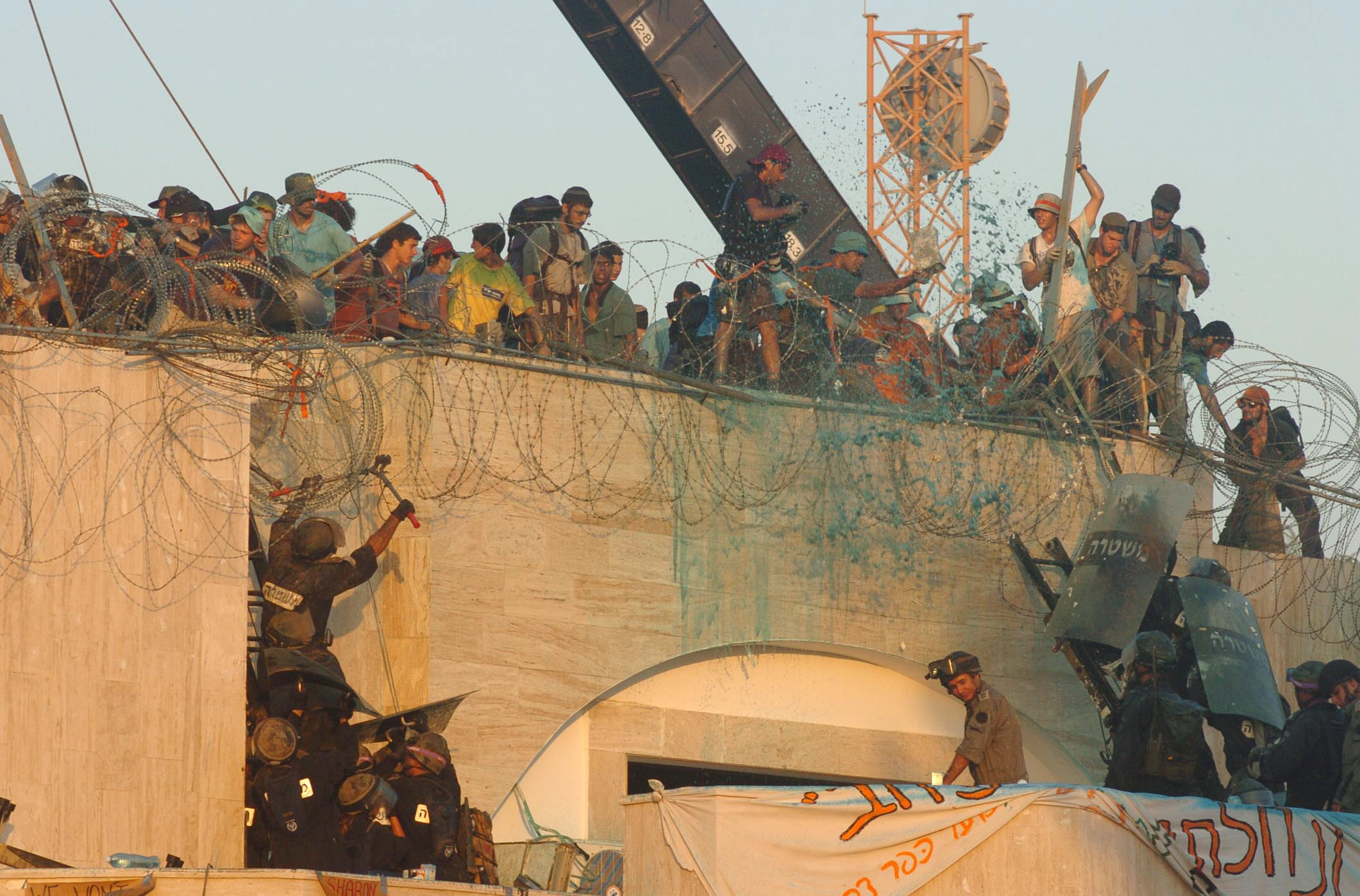
Residents protest during the forced evacuation of the Israeli settlement Kfar Darom. August 18, 2005.

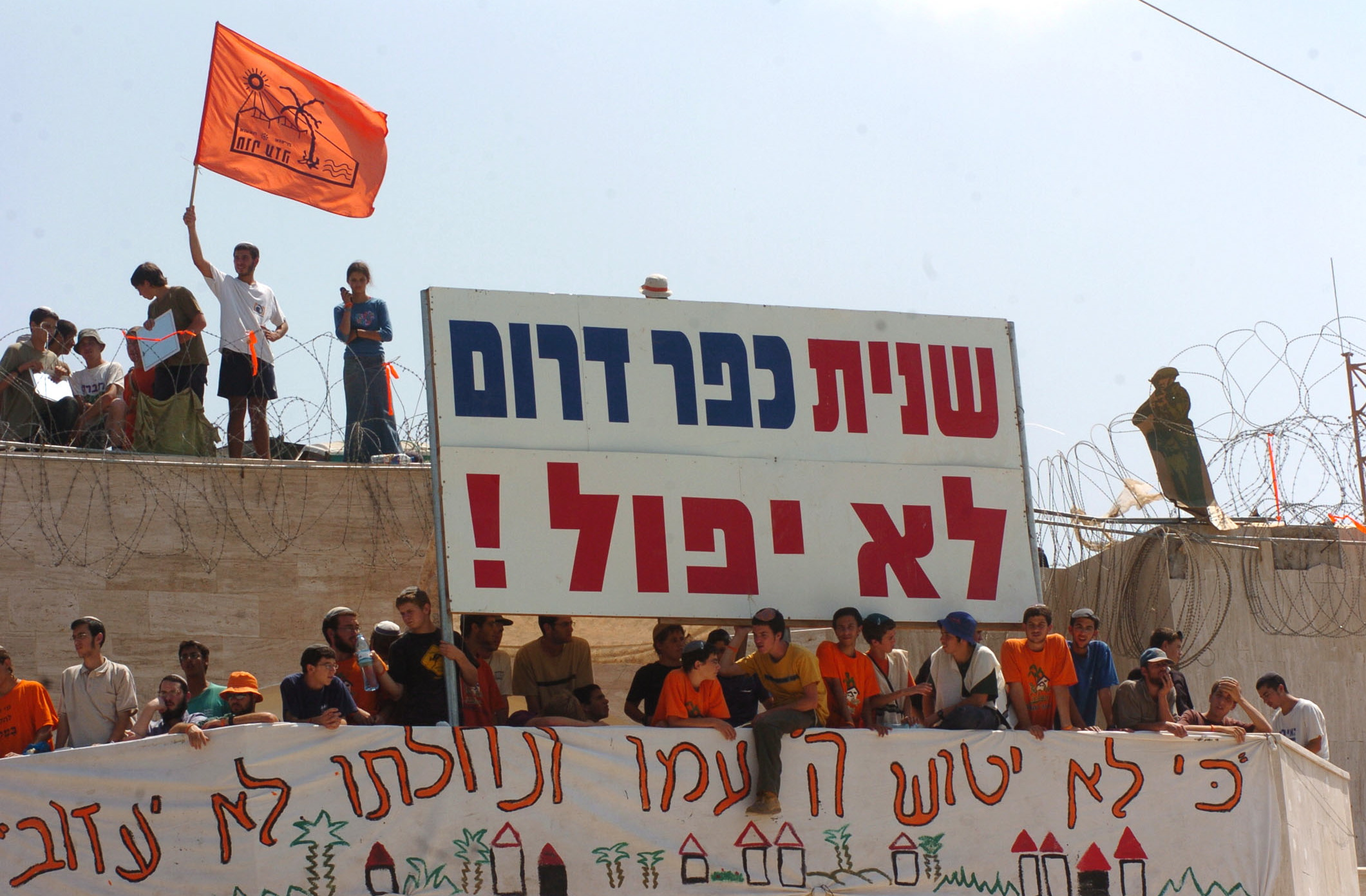
Residents protest against the evacuation of Kfar Darom. The sign reads: "Kfar Darom will not fall twice!". August 18, 2005.

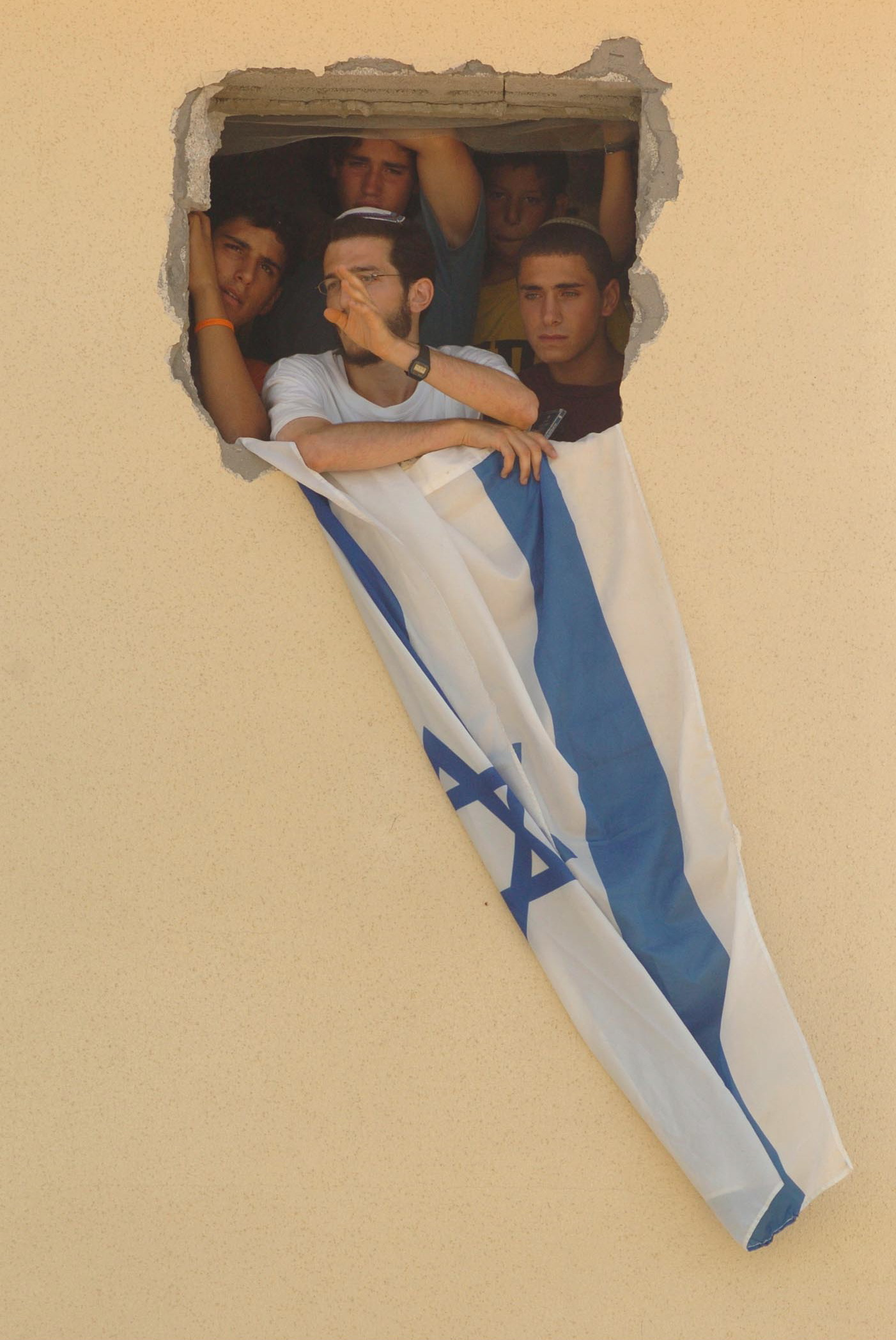
A group of residents refuses to evacuate the Israeli settlement Bedolah. August 17, 2005.

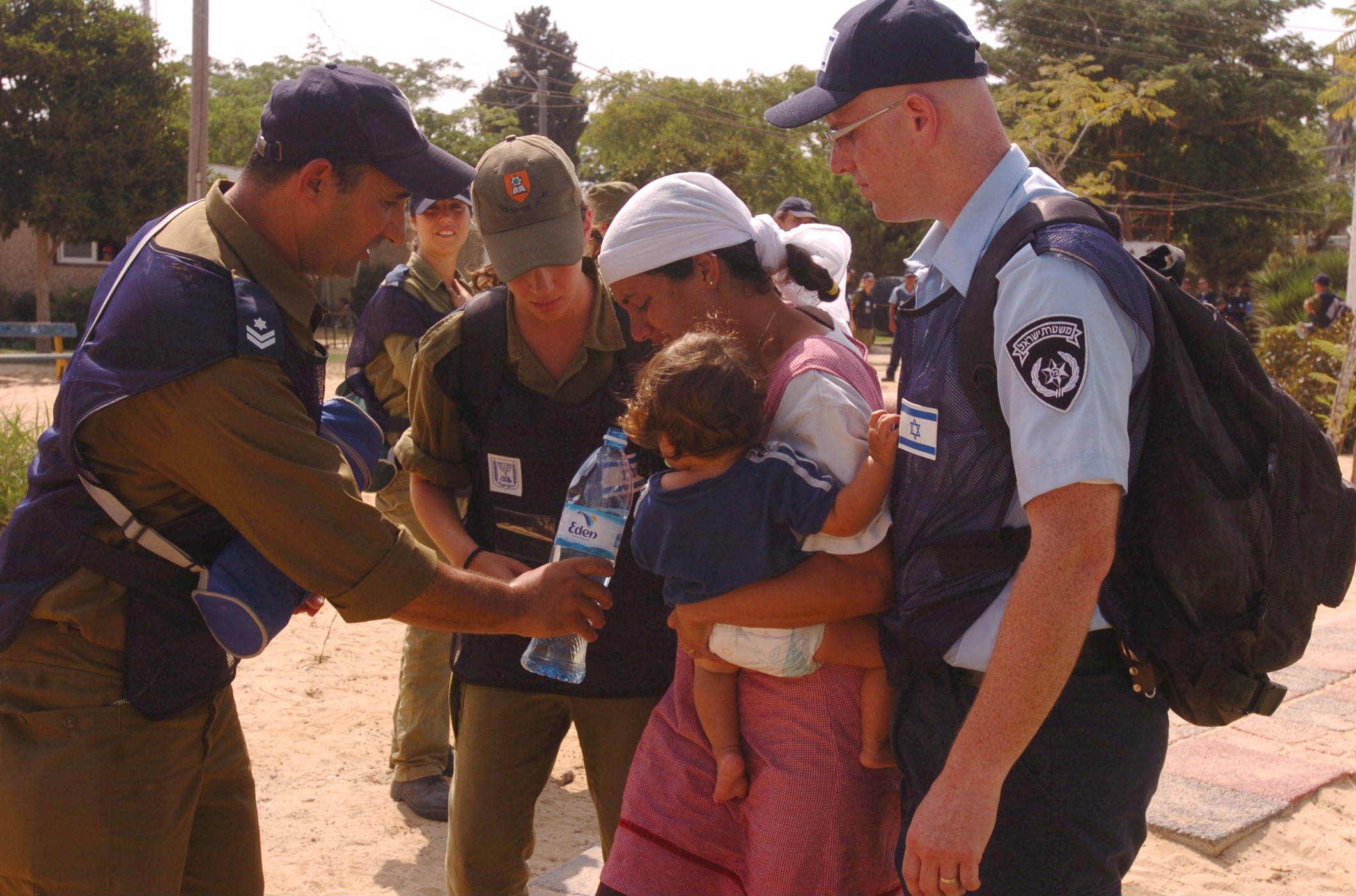
Morag residents being evacuated. August 17, 2005.

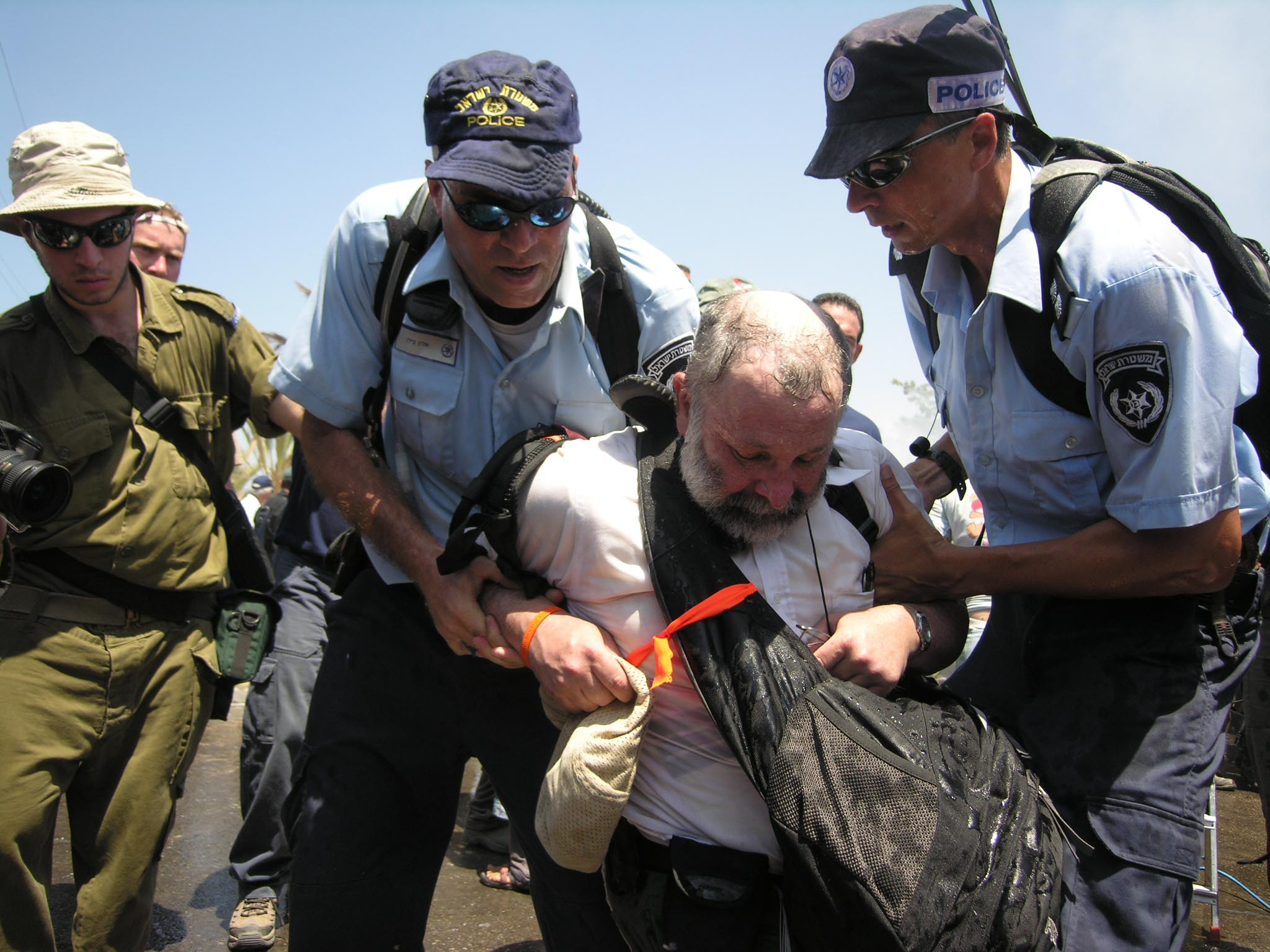
Police officers forcibly removing a resident from Neve Dekalim. August 16, 2005.

The disengagement began with Operation "Yad l'Achim" (Hebrew: מבצע יד לאחים, lit. 'Giving brothers a hand').

The aim of the operation was to give the Gush Katif settlers the option to leave voluntarily. IDF soldiers helped the settlers who chose to do so by packing their belongings and carrying them. During the operation, soldiers went into settlers' homes and presented them with removal decrees. In addition, the IDF arranged crews of social nurses, psychologists, and support to youths.

On April 8, 2005, Defense Minister Shaul Mofaz said that Israel should consider not demolishing the evacuated buildings in the Gaza Strip, with the exception of synagogues (due to fears of their potential desecration, which eventually did occur), since it would be more costly and time-consuming. This contrasted with the original plan by the Prime Minister to demolish all vacated buildings.

On May 9, the beginning of the evacuation of settlements was officially postponed from July 20 until August 15, so as to not coincide with the Jewish period of The Three Weeks and the fast of Tisha B'Av, traditionally marking grief and destruction.

On July 13, Sharon signed the closure order of Gush Katif, making the area a closed military zone. From that point on, only residents who presented Israeli ID cards with their registered address in Gush Katif were permitted to enter. Permits for 24–48 hours were given to select visitors for a few weeks before the entire area was completely sealed off to non-residents. Despite this ban, opponents of the disengagement managed to sneak in by foot through fields and bare soil. Estimates range from a few hundred to an army estimate of 5000 infiltrators. At one point, Sharon contemplated deploying Israel Border Police (Magav) forces to remove non-residents, but decided against it, as the staffing requirement would have been too great.

About two-thirds of settlers accepted compensation for voluntary relocation.

At midnight between August 14 and 15, the Kissufim crossing was shut down, and the Gaza Strip became officially closed for entrance by Israelis. The Gush Katif Municipal Council threatened to unilaterally declare independence, citing the Gaza Strip's internationally disputed status and Halakha as a foundation. Meanwhile, on August 14, Aryeh Yitzhaki proclaimed the independence of Shirat HaYam as "The Independent Jewish Authority in Gaza Beach", and submitted appeals for recognition to the United Nations and Red Cross.

On August 15, the evacuation commenced under the orders of Maj. Gen. Dan Harel of the Southern Command. At 8 a.m., a convoy of security forces entered Neve Dekalim and began evacuating residents. Many settlers chose to leave peacefully, others were forcibly evicted, and some attempted to block buses and clashed with security forces. The evacuation continued after midnight of August 17 by agreement with settlers who requested a time extension for packing their things, and to compensate for the evacuation delays caused by protesters. Some settlers had already shipped out their belongings because they knew they would be unable to remain, but on principle refused to leave voluntarily and stayed so the military would be required to remove them by force.

Evacuations of six settlements shifted into forced removals as 14,000 Israeli soldiers and police officers forcibly evicted settlers and "mistanenim" (infiltrators). They went house to house, ordering settlers to leave and breaking down the doors of those who did not. There were scenes of troops dragging screaming and sobbing families from houses and synagogues, but with less violence than expected. Some of the soldiers were also observed sobbing, and there were instances of soldiers joining settlers in prayer before evicting them. Some settlers lit their homes on fire as they evacuated so as to leave the Palestinians nothing. Settlers blocked roads, lit fires, and pleaded with soldiers to disobey orders. One West Bank settler set herself on fire in front of a Gaza checkpoint, and in Neve Dekalim, a group of fifteen American Orthodox Jews barricaded themselves in a basement and threatened to light themselves on fire. One policeman had ammonia thrown in his eyes. One soldier was stabbed. Two far-right Israelis self-immolated in protest.

Kfar Darom was next evacuated. Residents and their supporters strung up barbed wire fences around the area, and security forces cut their way in. Some 300 settlers barricaded themselves in the local synagogue, while another group barricaded themselves on the roof with barbed wire, and pelted security forces with various objects. Police removed them by force after negotiations failed, and there were injuries to both settlers and officers. On August 17, the settlement of Morag was evacuated by 200 police officers.

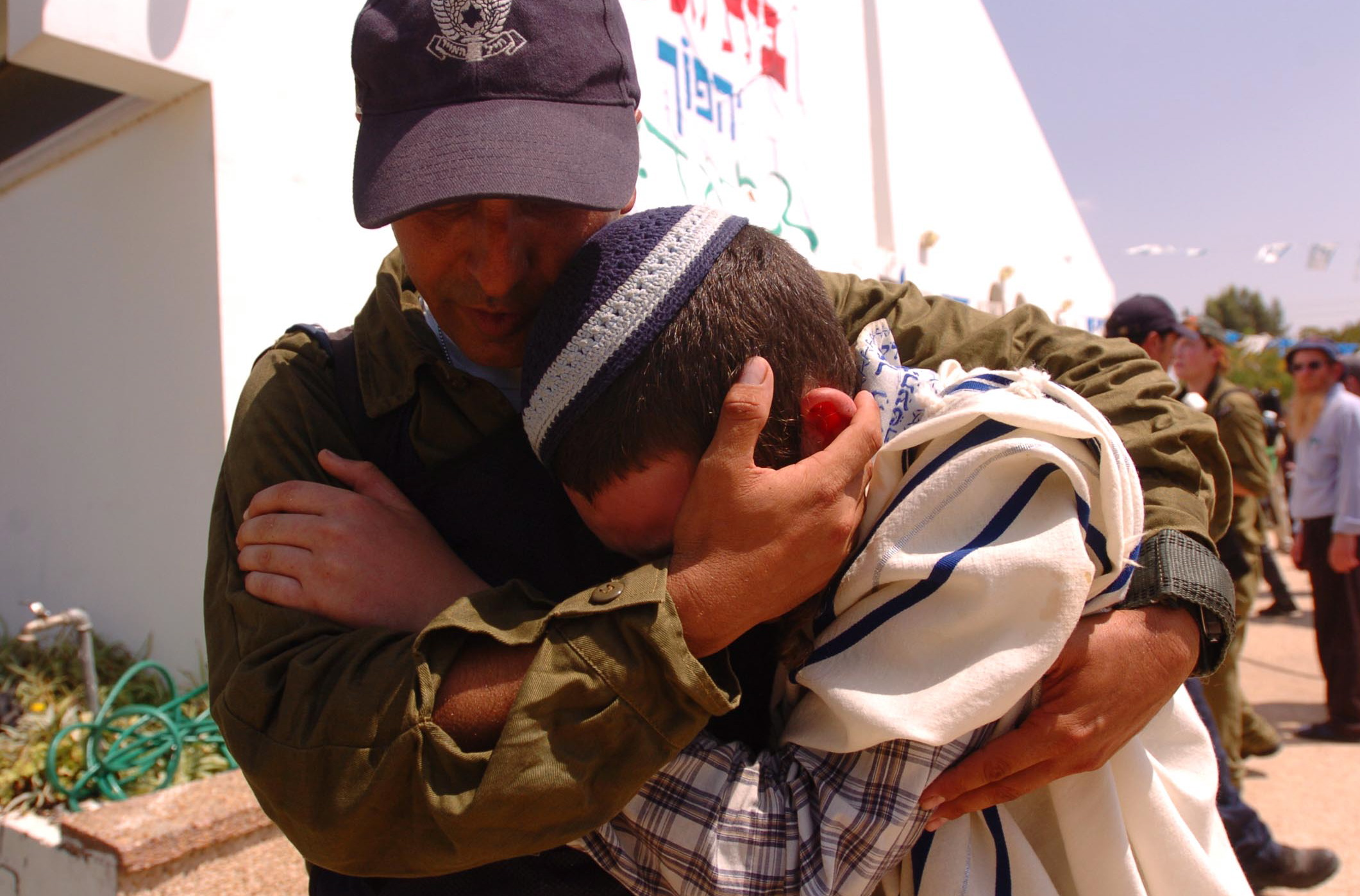
A soldier comforts a resident while evacuating the Israeli settlement in Gaza.

On August 18, Shirat HaYam was evacuated by military and police forces, after infiltrators had been removed and the settlement's speaker system was disabled after settlers used it to call on troops to disobey orders. Youth placed obstacles made of flammable materials and torched tires and garbage dumpsters. Fires spread to Palestinian areas, and IDF bulldozers were deployed to put them out. A number of people also barricaded themselves in the synagogue and public buildings and on a deserted rooftop. Aryeh Yitzhaki defended his home with an M16 rifle, and dozens of settlers barricaded themselves inside or on the roof of his home, with at least four of those on the rooftop being armed. A brief stand-off with security forces ensued, and snipers were deployed after Yitzhaki threatened to fire at troops. Security forces stormed the rooftop and arrested settlers without any violence. IDF and police forces evacuated the home after Yitzhaki surrendered weapons and ammunition belonging to his group, but were met with bags of paint and whitewash thrown by settlers, and Yitzhaki's wife and another right-wing activist initially refused to evacuate and lay on the ground holding their infants.

Bedouin citizens of Israel from the village of Dahaniya, situated in the no-man's land on the Israel–Gaza Strip border, were evacuated and resettled in Arad. The village had a long history of cooperation with Israel, and the residents, who were viewed in Gaza as traitors, had asked to be evacuated due to security concerns.

On August 19, The Guardian reported that some settlers had their children leave their homes with their hands up, or wearing a Star of David badge, to associate the actions of Israel with Nazi Germany and the Holocaust. Some protestors said that they would "not go like sheep to the slaughter", a phrase strongly associated with the Holocaust. On August 22, Netzarim was evacuated by the Israeli military, completing the withdrawal.

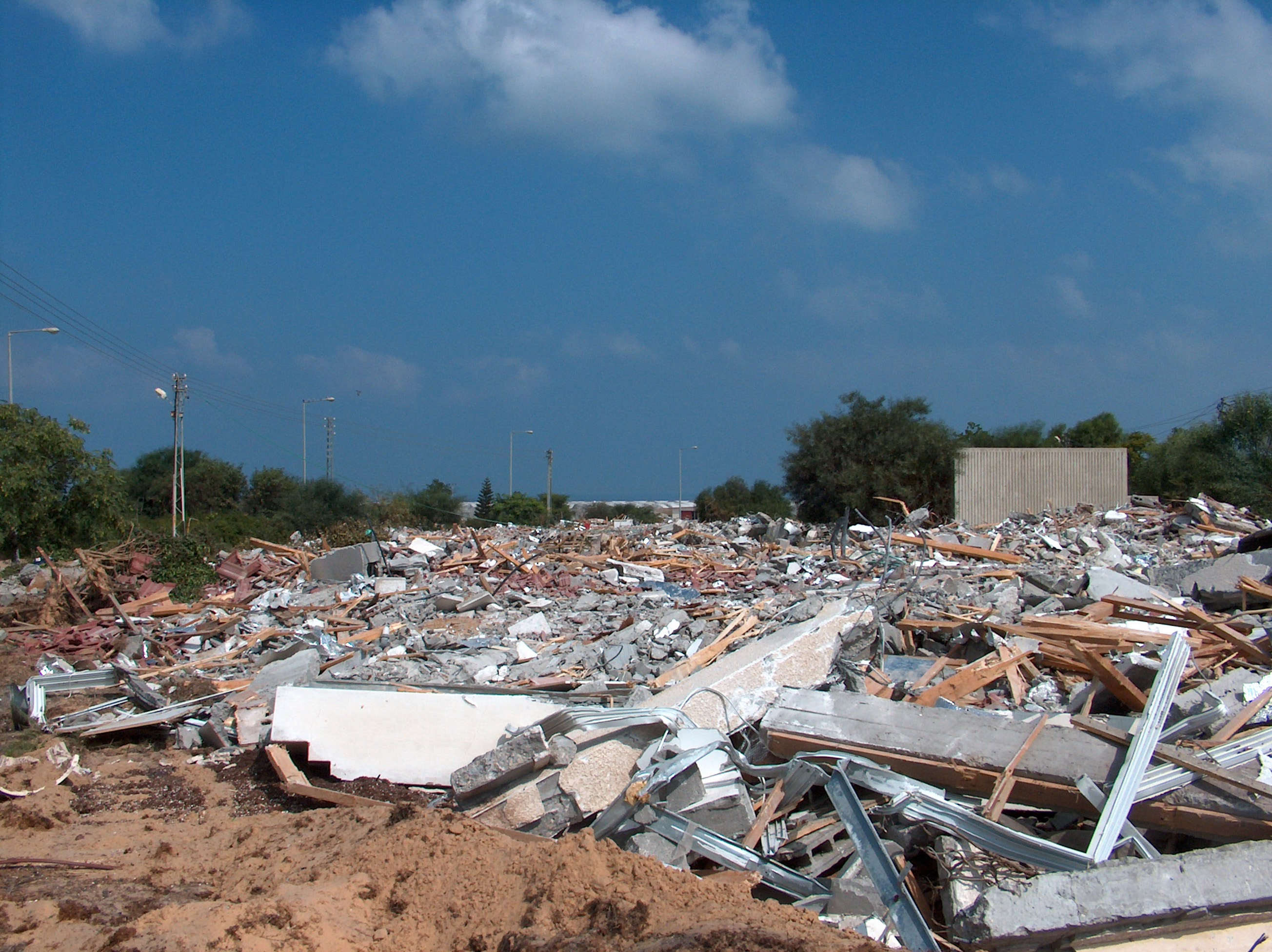
Rubble after the demolition of homes in the Katif settlement by the Israeli Ground Forces, August 2005

The evacuation of the settlers was completed by August 22, after which demolition crews razed 2,800 houses, community buildings and 26 synagogues. Two synagogues, whose construction allowed for them to be taken apart and reassembled, were dismantled and rebuilt in Israel. The demolition of the homes was completed on September 1, while the Shirat HaYam hotel was demolished later.

On August 28, the IDF began dismantling Gush Katif's 48-grave cemetery. All of the bodies were removed by special teams of soldiers supervised by the Military Rabbinate and reburied in locations of their families' choosing. In accordance with Jewish law, all soil touching the remains was also transferred, and the dead were given second funerals, with the families observing a one-day mourning period. All coffins were draped in the Israeli flag on the way to reburial. The transfer was completed on September 1.

The IDF also pulled out its forces in the Gaza Strip, and had withdrawn 95% of its military equipment by September 1. On September 7, the IDF announced that it planned to advance its full withdrawal from the Gaza Strip to September 12, pending cabinet approval. It was also announced that in the area evacuated in the West Bank the IDF planned to transfer all control (excluding building permits and anti-terrorism) to the PNA – the area will remain "Area C" (full Israeli control) de jure, but "Area A" (full PNA control) de facto.

When the disengagement began, Israel had not yet decided on whether or not to withdraw from the Philadelphi Corridor, a narrow strip of land serving as a buffer zone along the border between the Gaza Strip and Egypt. Although Sharon was initially opposed to withdrawing from the Philadelphi Corridor, he relented after legal advisers told him that it was impossible to declare Israel had fully withdrawn from the Gaza Strip so long as it controlled the border with Egypt. On August 28, the Israeli government approved the Philadelphi Accord, under which Egypt, which was prohibited from militarizing the Sinai without Israeli approval as per its peace treaty with Israel, was authorized to deploy 750 border guards equipped with heavy weaponry to the Philadelphi Corridor. The agreement was approved by the Knesset on August 31. On September 12, the IDF withdrew all forces from the Philadelphi Corridor.

The Israeli Supreme Court, in response to a settlers' petition to block the government's destruction of the synagogues, gave the go-ahead to the Israeli government. Sharon decided not to proceed with their demolition, however. On September 11, the Israeli cabinet revised an earlier decision to destroy the synagogues of the settlements. The Palestinian Authority protested Israel's decision, arguing that it would rather Israel dismantle the synagogues. On September 11, a ceremony was held when the last Israeli flag was lowered in the IDF's Gaza Strip divisional headquarters. All remaining IDF forces left the Gaza Strip in the following hours. The last soldier left the strip, and the Kissufim gate was closed on the early morning of September 12. This completed the Israeli pullout from the Gaza Strip. However, an official handover ceremony was cancelled after the Palestinian Authority boycotted it in response to Israel's decision not to demolish the synagogues. On September 21, Israel officially declared the Gaza Strip to be an extraterritorial jurisdiction and the four border crossings on the Israel-Gaza border to be international border crossings, with a valid passport or other appropriate travel documents now required to cross through them.

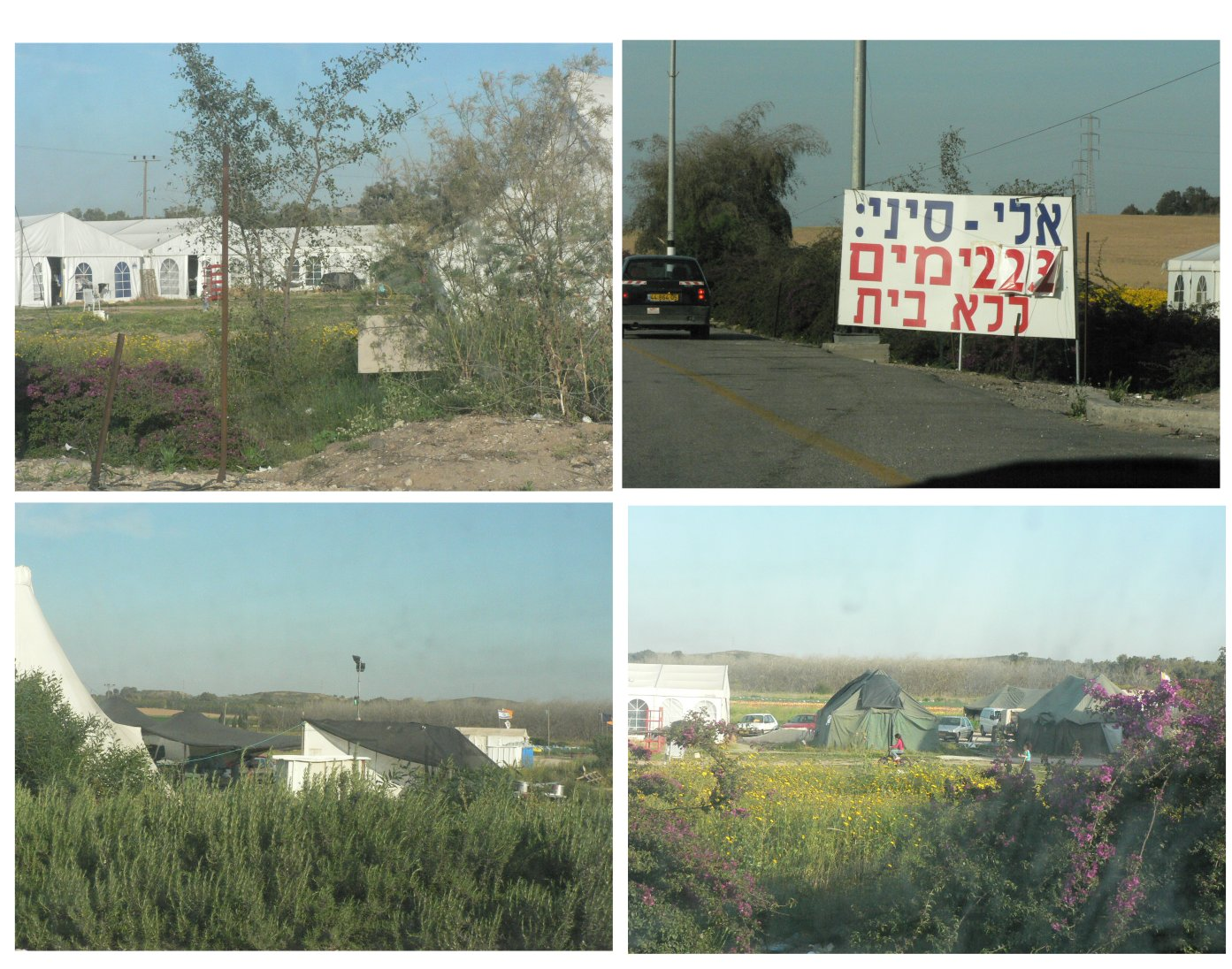
Residents of Elei Sinai camping in Yad Mordechai, just over the border from their former homes

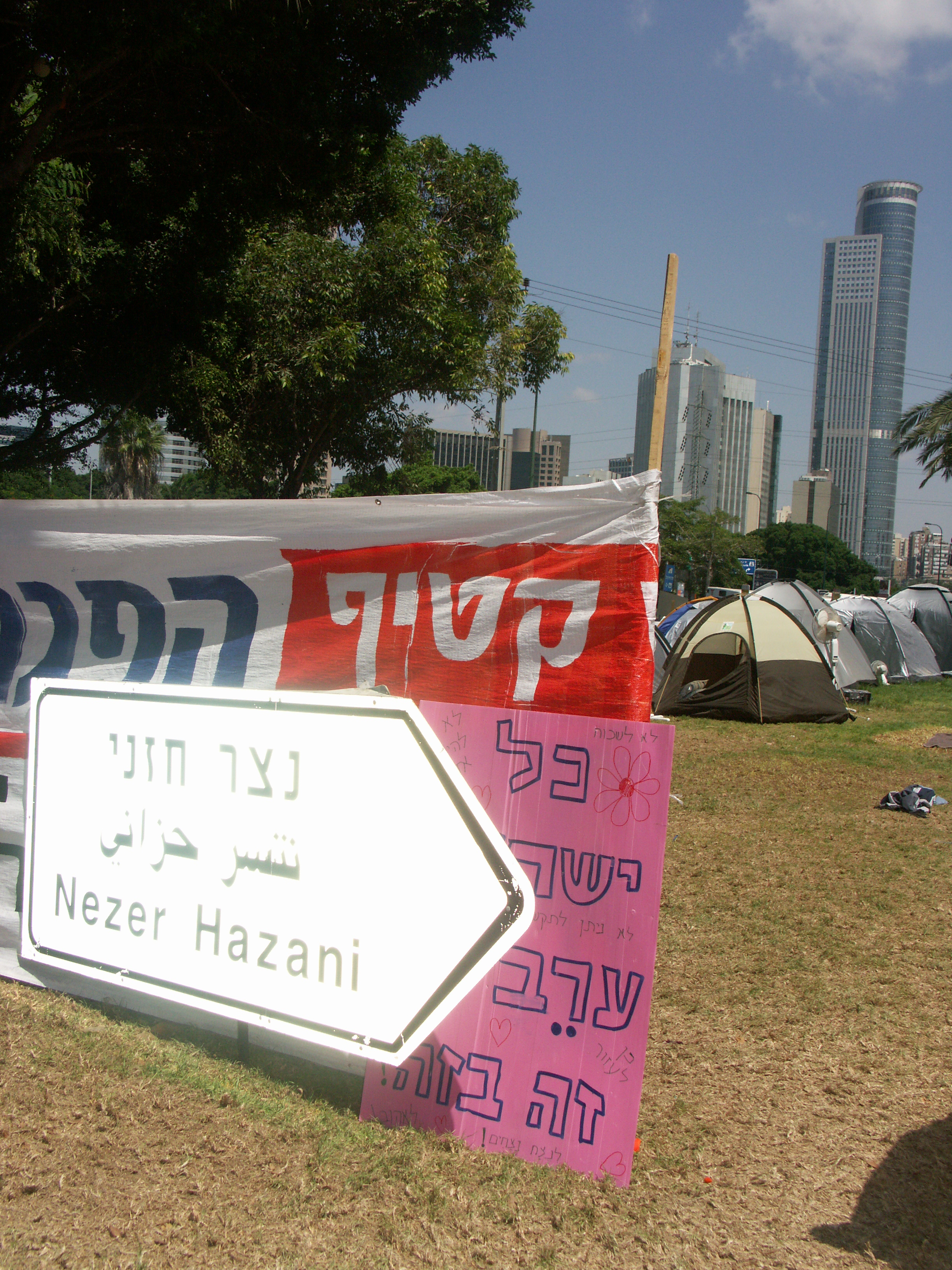
A protest camp in Tel Aviv by members of Netzer Hazani left without homes

=== Northern West Bank (Samaria) ===
On September 22, the IDF evacuated the four settlements in the northern West Bank. While the residents of Ganim and Kadim, mostly middle-class seculars, had long since left their homes, several families and about 2,000 outsiders tried to prevent the evacuation of Sa-Nur and Homesh, which had a larger percent of observant population. Following negotiations, the evacuation was completed relatively peacefully. The settlements were subsequently razed, with 270 homes being bulldozed. In Sa-Nur, the synagogue was left intact, but was buried under mounds of sand by bulldozers to prevent its destruction by the Palestinians.

During the pullout, hundreds of people were arrested for rioting, and criminal charges were filed against 482 of them. On January 25, 2010, the Knesset passed a bill granting a general amnesty to around 400 of them, mostly teenagers. While most had by then finished serving their sentences, their criminal records were expunged. The people who were not pardoned as part of this amnesty had either been convicted of crimes that involved endangering human life, and involved the use of explosives or serious violence, or had a previous criminal record.

Following Israel's withdrawal, on September 12 Palestinian crowds entered the settlements waving PLO and Hamas flags, firing gunshots into the air and setting off firecrackers, and chanting slogans. Radicals among them desecrated 4 synagogues. Destroyed homes were ransacked. Hamas leaders held celebratory prayers in Kfar Darom synagogue as mobs continued to ransack and loot synagogues. Palestinian Authority security forces did not intervene, and announced that the synagogues would be destroyed. Less than 24 hours after the withdrawal, Palestinian Authority bulldozers began to demolish the remaining synagogues. Hamas took credit for the withdrawal, and one of their banners read: 'Four years of resistance beat ten years of negotiations.'

=== Greenhouses ===
When Israel left, large numbers of greenhouses that had been handed over to assist economic regrowth were destroyed by Israeli settlers or damaged by Palestinians. Half of the greenhouses were demolished by their owners before being evacuated for lack of the agreed payment. Two months prior to the withdrawal, half of the 21 settlements' greenhouses, spread over 400 hectares (1,000 acres), had been dismantled by their owners, leaving the remainder on 200 hectares (500 acres), placing its business viability on a weak footing. The Economic Cooperation Foundation of American Jewish donors raised $14 million to buy over 3,000 greenhouses from Israeli settlers to transfer to the Palestinian Authority. International bodies, and pressure from James Wolfensohn, Middle East envoy of the Quartet, who gave $500,000 of his own money, offered incentives for the rest of the greenhouses to be left to the Palestinians of Gaza. An agreement was reached with Israel under international law to destroy the settlers' houses and shift the rubble to Egypt. The disposal of asbestos presented a particular problem: some 60,000 truckloads of rubble required passage to Egypt.

The remaining settlements' greenhouses were looted by Palestinians for 2 days after the transfer, for irrigation pipes, water pumps, plastic sheeting and glass, but the greenhouses themselves remained structurally intact, until order was restored. The deputy Palestinian finance minister said around 30% of greenhouses were damaged. Palestinian Authority security forces attempted to stop the looters, but were inadequately staffed. In some places, there was no security, while some Palestinian police officers joined the looters. The Palestine Economic Development Company (PED) invested $20,000,000 and by October the industry was back on its feet. Economic consultants estimated that the closures cost the whole agricultural sector in Gaza $450,000 a day in lost revenue. 25 truckloads of produce per diem through that crossing were needed to render the project viable, but only rarely were just 3 truckloads able to obtain transit at the crossing, which however functioned only sporadically, with Israel citing security concerns. It appears that on both sides corruption prevailed, such as instances of Gazans negotiating with Israeli officers at the crossing and offering bribes to get their trucks over the border. By early 2006, farmers, faced with the slowness of transit, were forced to dump most of their produce at the crossing where it was eaten by goats. Ariel Sharon fell ill, a new Israeli administration eventually came to power and Wolfensohn resigned his office, after suffering from obstacles placed in his way by the U.S. administration, which was sceptical of the agreements reached on border terminals. Wolfensohn attributed this policy of hindrance to Elliott Abrams. Further complications arose from Hamas's election victory in January 2006, and the rift that emerged between Hamas and Fatah. He attributed the electoral success of Hamas to the frustration felt by Palestinians over the non-implementation of these agreements, which shattered their brief experience of normality. "Instead of hope, the Palestinians saw that they were put back in prison," he concluded. The project was shut down in April 2006 when money ran out to pay the agricultural workers.

=== Lawsuits to stop evictions ===
On June 9, 2005, the Israeli Supreme Court ruled the Gaza withdrawal plan was constitutional, rejecting 12 petitions by opponents of the withdrawal. In their 320-page ruling, the judges upheld four technical challenges dealing with financial compensation for settlers who were to be evicted, but stressed the withdrawal itself was constitutional and did not violate the human rights of Israeli settlers.

Yoram Sheftel, a lawyer for the settlers, said his expectations were low because the Supreme Court tended to side with the government against Israeli settlers. He said "We didn't expect anything from this court since the petitioners are Jews and patriots. This was fully expected." However, Israeli justice minister Tzipi Livni praised the court decision, expressing hope that the ruling would defuse potentially violent settler resistance to the evacuation. She told Army Radio "I hope this ruling makes it absolutely clear to the individual settler that the plan is going ahead."

Israeli settlers in Gaza also attempted to stop the evictions by saying they were protected persons under Article 4 of the Fourth Geneva Convention and therefore it would be a war crime for Israel to evict them from the region per Article 49 of the same convention. On August 22, 2005, the Israeli Supreme Court dismissed the petition, saying:

[...] by virtue thereof should be dismissed (858 F-G) 3. [...] the petitioners, who are Israeli citizens living in the evicted areas, do not fall under the definition of the term “protected persons” under the 1949 Geneva Convention for the Protection of Civilians in Times of War, and under the principles of the laws of occupation.

According to the court, Israeli settlers were not protected persons under international humanitarian law if any harm came from Israel since they were nationals of that country in the context of international armed conflict (IAC). The laws of war applicable to IAC generally accords protection to enemy nationals and stateless persons or neutral citizens outside the territory of a belligerent power, but not to nationals under their own state authority, neutral citizens in the territory belonging to a belligerent nation, and nationals of a co-belligerent country.

== Aftermath ==
The year of the disengagement would see the removal of 8,475 settlers from Gaza, while in that same year the number of new settlers in the West Bank increased by 15,000. After Israel's disengagement, there was increased freedom of movement within Gaza due to Israel's removal of its settlements. Israel's disengagement also resulted in loss of the settlement factories, workshops, and greenhouses where Gazans were employed. The year following the disengagement saw a tightening of external Israeli control over Gaza, specifically, the closure of crossings into Gaza for people and goods, increased restrictions on the coastline for fishing, and increased aerial, maritime and on the ground military activity. The Israeli human rights organization Gisha lists various examples of actions requiring Israeli permission or approval in the year following the disengagement. These restrictions include the need for Israeli permission to import basic necessities such as milk, to host foreign lecturers at universities, and register children in the Palestinian population registry. Additionally, fishermen must obtain permission to fish off Gaza's coast, and nonprofits need approval to receive tax-exempt donations. Financial transactions such as the transfer of salaries to teachers are also controlled by Israel, which affects the payment of salaries by the Palestinian Ministry of Education. Moreover, farmers require authorization to export agricultural products, and students wishing to study abroad depend on Israel's approval for the opening of the Gaza-Egypt crossing.

Political economist Sara Roy describes the disengagement from Gaza as completing the separation and isolation of the Gaza Strip from the West Bank. She describes the period before the disengagement as a period of increasing dependence on the Israeli economy and that of the West Bank, while the period after the disengagement is characterized by economic, social and political isolation of Gaza. She describes the disengagement as normalizing the occupation in the eyes of the international community, despite the expansion of the occupation and the lack of any "safe passage" between Gaza and the West Bank.

=== Compensation and resettlement ===
Under legislation passed by the Knesset, evacuated settlers were to be compensated for the loss of their homes, lands, and businesses. Originally, the law only allowed anyone age 21 or over who had lived in one of the evacuated settlements for over five consecutive years to be compensated, but the Israeli Supreme Court ruled that compensation for younger settlers should also be included in compensation payments to evacuated families. Settlers who lived in the area for at least two years were eligible for more money. The Israeli government offered bonuses to settlers who moved to the Galilee or Negev, and implemented a program in which settlers had the option to build their own homes, with the option of a rental grant. The Housing Ministry doubled the number of apartments available in the Negev. Farmers were offered farmland or plots of land on which to build a home, in exchange for reduced compensation. Land was to be compensated at a rate of $50,000 per dunam ($500,000 per hectare or $202,000 per acre), with homes being compensated at a rate per square meter.

Workers who lost their jobs were eligible for unemployment benefits ranging from minimum wage to twice the average salary, for up to six months. Workers aged 50 to 55 were offered years' worth of unemployment benefits, and those over 55 were eligible for a pension until age 67. A special category was created for communities that moved en masse, with the government funding the replacement of communal buildings. In cases where communities did not stay together and communal property was lost, individuals would receive compensation for donations made to those buildings. Taxes on compensation sums given to business owners were reduced from ten to five percent. The total cost of the compensation package as adopted by the Knesset was 3.8 billion NIS (approximately $870 million). Following an increase in the number of compensation claims after the disengagement, another 1.5 billion NIS (approximately $250 million) was added. In 2007, a further $125 million was added to the compensation budget. Approximately $176 million was to be paid directly to the evacuees, $66 million to private business owners, and the rest was allocated to finance the government's pullout-related expenses. Yitzhak Meron, the lawyer who represented the evacuees, described how this came about in dealing with the government offices as well as his perception of the situation.

According to an Israeli committee of inquiry, the government failed to properly implement its compensation plans. By April 2006, only minimal compensation (approximately $10,000) had been paid to families to survive until they obtained new jobs, which was difficult for most people, considering that most of the newly unemployed were middle-aged and lost the agricultural resources that were their livelihood. Those seeking compensation also had to negotiate legal and bureaucratic hurdles. This criticism received further support from State Comptroller Micha Lindenstrauss's report, which determined that the treatment of the evacuees was a "big failure" and pointed out many shortcomings.

By 2007, 56.8% of evacuees had found jobs, 22.3% were unemployed and seeking work, and 31.2% of evacuees were unemployed and living off government benefits rather than seeking work. The average monthly salary among the evacuees was NIS 5,380 (about $1,281), a slight rise of 2.1 percent from the average salary the year before. This was, however, a sharp drop of 39% from the settlers' average monthly income before the disengagement. The average salary among evacuees was lower than the general average, as compared to above average before the disengagement. In addition to a drop in salary, the evacuees also suffered a drop in their standard of living due to the increased price of goods and services in their places of residence as compared to the settlements. In 2010 a bill was introduced in the Knesset providing a basic pension to business owners whose businesses collapsed. By August 2014, unemployment among evacuees had dropped to 18%.

Following the disengagement, settlers were temporarily relocated to hotels, sometimes for as long as half a year, before moving to mobile homes as temporary housing known as 'caravillas', before they could build proper homes. By June 2014, about 60% of evacuees were still living in these caravillas. Only 40% had moved to permanent housing, although construction of permanent settlements for the evacuees continues to progress. By July 2014, eleven towns for the evacuees had been completed with the expellees joining ten additional towns. Many of the permanent settlements under construction were given names reminiscent of the former Gaza settlements. The primary destinations for relocation included: Nitzan & Nitzan Bet, Bnei Dekalim (by evacuees from Neve Dekalim), Yad Binyamin, Ganei Tal, Netzer Hazani, Karmei Katif, Neta, Shomriya, Tene Omarim, Bnei Netzarim (by evacuees from Netzarim) and Naveh.

=== Fatah–Hamas conflict ===
In September 2005, CNN reported increasing lawlessness in Gaza, rival militant groups competing for power, and hundreds of masked Hamas gunmen carrying rifles and grenade launchers marching through the streets of a refugee camp.

Following the withdrawal, Hamas was elected as the Palestinian government in 2006, which started the chain reaction leading to Operation "Summer Rains" later within that year.

In December 2006, news reports indicated that a number of Palestinians were leaving the Gaza Strip, due to political disorder and "economic pressure" there. In January 2007, fighting continued between Hamas and Fatah, without any progress towards resolution or reconciliation. Fighting spread to several points in the Gaza Strip with both factions attacking each other. In response to constant attacks by rocket fire from the Gaza Strip, Israel launched an airstrike which destroyed a building used by Hamas. In June 2007, the Fatah–Hamas conflict reached its height and Hamas took control over the Gaza Strip. An emergency cabinet led by Fatah began governing the West Bank. Palestinian Authority President Mahmoud Abbas called for Hamas to let go of its position, but the Gaza Strip remains controlled by Hamas.

=== Closure ===
A British Parliamentary commission, summing up the situation eight months later, found that while the Rafah crossing agreement worked efficiently (although this crossing was closed for 148 days in 2006), from January–April 2006, the Karni crossing was closed 45% of the time, and severe limitations were in place on exports from Gaza, with, according to OCHA figures, only 1,500 of 8,500 tons of produce getting through; that they were informed most closures were unrelated to security issues in Gaza but either responses to violence in the West Bank or for no given reason. The promised transit of convoys between Gaza and the West Bank was not honoured; with Israel insisting that such convoys could only pass if they passed through a specially constructed tunnel or ditch, requiring a specific construction project in the future; Israel withdrew from implementation talks in December 2005 after a suicide bombing attack on Israelis in Netanya by a Palestinian from Kafr Rai.

Gisha reported that during the 2006 winter agricultural season, in which Gaza farmers were to export produce to Israel, the West Bank, and Europe, the Karni Crossing was closed 47% of the time. The closures caused an estimated $30 million in losses in the first quarter of 2006 alone. In the first year following the disengagement, the number of trucks carrying exports from the Gaza Strip per day was fewer than 20. In comparison, the agreement with Israel stipulated allowing 400 trucks to exit per day.

=== Museum ===
In August 2008, a museum of Gush Katif opened in Jerusalem near Machane Yehuda. Yankeleh Klein, the museum director, sees it as an artistic commemoration of the expulsion from the 21 Gaza settlements, and the evacuees' longing to return. The art displayed in the museum is that of Gaza evacuees along with pieces by photographers and artists who were involved in the disengagement or were affected by it.

In the newly renovated Katif Center, more properly called the "Gush Katif Heritage Center in Nitzan," Israel, guided tours are provided by Gush Katif expellees. Project Coordinator Laurence Beziz notes that "Our goal is to tell the story of 35 years of pioneering the land of Israel in Gush Katif and to allow an insight as to what life was in Gush Katif."

== Controversy over occupation status ==
In present day, the United Nations, international human rights organizations and many legal scholars regard the Gaza Strip to still be under military occupation by Israel. The International Court of Justice reaffirmed this position, stating that the occupation of the West Bank, East Jerusalem and Gaza Strip are unlawful and its discriminatory laws and policies against Palestinians violate the prohibition on racial segregation and apartheid. The ICJ rejected the claim that Gaza was no longer occupied following the 2005 disengagement, on the basis of Israel's continued control over the Gaza Strip.

In Jaber Al-Bassiouni Ahmed v. The Prime Minister, the Israeli Supreme Court assumed that occupation had ended with the disengagement but did not explain the theory or facts that led to this conclusion. After the disengagement, Israel claimed that its occupation of Gaza had ended, but also acknowledged that Gaza was not a sovereign state. It labeled Gaza as a "hostile entity," a status that neither grants Palestinians the right to self-governance and self-protection, nor obliges Israel to protect Gaza's civilian population. Israel uses this argument to deny Palestinians of full self-governance as well as the use of military force to suppress any resistance to Israeli control.

Following the withdrawal, Israel continued to maintain direct control over Gaza's air and maritime space, six of Gaza's seven land crossings, maintains a no-go buffer zone within the territory, controls the Palestinian population registry, and Gaza remains dependent on Israel for its water, electricity, telecommunications, and other utilities.

Some argue that Gaza is not occupied given that Israel does not have "boots on the ground" in the territory (permanently). The European Court of Human Rights made a similar argument in the case of Nagorno-Karabach. Cuyckens argues that such a requirement would allow the occupying power "to easily escape the obligations otherwise imposed upon it under the law of occupation by avoiding placing troops on the ground while nevertheless controlling the territory concerned from the outside." However, she agrees that Gaza is no longer occupied – "Gaza is not technically occupied, given that there is no longer any effective control in the sense of Article 42 of the Hague Regulations." Yoram Dinstein argues that "the Occupying Power must deploy boots on the ground in or near the territory" but that the withdrawal from the Gaza Strip can be at most seen as a "partial withdrawal", since Israel continues to occupy the West Bank. Dinstein argues that the occupation of the Gaza Strip has not ended and that Israel's insistence on its liberty to retake any section of the Gaza Strip militarily is a testament to that fact. Yuval Shany argues that Israel is probably not an occupying power in Gaza under international law, writing that "it is difficult to continue and regard Israel as the occupying power in Gaza under the traditional law of occupation". In 2024, Shany reaffirmed that "Indeed, control for purposes of a determination of belligerent occupation does not require the continual presence of the army everywhere within the territory." Rubin argues that regardless of the conditions imposed by Israel after disengagement, the occupation ended after Israel withdrew from the Gaza Strip.”

== Reception ==
=== Pro and against withdrawal ===
The Disengagement Plan was also criticized by both Israelis and other observers from the opposite viewpoint as an attempt to make permanent the different settlements of the West Bank, while the Gaza Strip was rendered to the Palestinian National Authority as an economically uninteresting territory with a Muslim population of nearly 1.4 million, seen as a "threat" to the Jewish identity of the Israeli democratic state. As Leila Shahid, speaker of the PNA in Europe declared, the sole fact of carrying out the plan unilaterally already showed that the plan was only thought of according to the objectives of Israel as viewed by Sharon. Brian Cowen, Irish Foreign Minister and speaker of the European Union (EU), announced the EU's disapproval of the plan's limited scope in that it did not address withdrawal from the entire West Bank. He said that the EU "will not recognize any change to the pre-1967 borders other than those arrived at by agreement between the parties." However, Europe has given tentative backing to the Disengagement plan as part of the road map for peace. Critics pointed out that, at the same time that Sharon was preparing the withdrawal, he was favoring settlements in the West Bank, among them Ma'ale Adumim, the largest Israeli settlement near Jerusalem. According to Peace Now, the number of settlers increased by 6,100 compared with 2004, to reach 250,000 in the West Bank. In an October 6, 2004, interview with Haaretz, Dov Weissglass, Sharon's chief of staff, declared: "The significance of the disengagement plan is the freezing of the peace process.... When you freeze that process, you prevent the establishment of a Palestinian state and you prevent a discussion on the refugees, the borders and Jerusalem. Disengagement supplies the amount of formaldehyde that is necessary so there will not be a political process with the Palestinians."

Benjamin Netanyahu resigned from Sharon's Cabinet over Israel's pullout from Gaza.

In 2014, the Knesset held a special plenary session 9 years after disengagement, with a wide array of responses from the current lawmakers. Some expressed rejection over the process entirely, while others supported the decision but criticized the implementation. There were also mentions of continued security problems for Israel along with lack of housing arrangements for evacuees 9 years after the disengagement.

=== Positions of foreign governments ===
==== United States ====
President George W. Bush endorsed the plan as a positive step towards the road map for peace.

In his May 26, 2005, joint press conference with Palestinian leader Mahmoud Abbas, in the White House Rose Garden, President George W. Bush stated his expectations vis-a-vis the Roadmap Plan. This included an expectation that changes to the 1949 Armistice lines be mutually agreed to and not made unilaterally. In addition, Bush stated his expectation that a two-state solution must ensure contiguity of the West Bank as well as "meaningful linkages" between the West Bank and Gaza Strip.

==== European Union ====
Javier Solana, High Representative for the Common Foreign and Security Policy (CFSP), stated on June 10, 2004, his support of the disengagement as an opportunity to restart the implementation of the Road Map.

The Irish Minister for Foreign Affairs, Brian Cowen (Ireland having Presidency of the EU at the time), announced the European Union's disapproval of the plan's limited scope in that it does not address withdrawal from the entire West Bank. He said that the EU "will not recognize any change to the pre-1967 borders other than those arrived at by agreement between the parties." However, Europe has given tentative backing to the Disengagement Plan as part of the road map for peace.

==== United Nations ====
Kofi Annan, United Nations Secretary-General, commended on August 18, 2005 what he called Israeli Prime Minister Sharon's "courageous decision" to carry through with the painful process of disengagement, expressed the hope that "both Palestinians and Israelis will exercise restraint in this challenging period", and "believes that a successful disengagement should be the first step towards a resumption of the peace process, in accordance with the Road Map", referring to the plan sponsored by the diplomatic Quartet – UN, EU, Russia, and the United States – which calls for a series of parallel steps leading to two states living side-by-side in peace by the end of the year.

=== Public opinion ===
==== Israeli opinions ====
Polls on support for the plan during the time showed support for the plan in the 50–60% range, and opposition in the 30–40% range. A June 9, 2005, Dahaf Institute/Yedioth Ahronoth poll showed support for the plan at 53%, and opposition at 38%. A June 17, telephone poll published in Maariv showed 54% of Israel's Jews supporting the plan. A poll carried out by the Midgam polling company, on June 29 found support at 48% and opposition at 41%, but a Dahaf Institute/Yedioth Ahronot poll of the same day found support at 62% and opposition at 31%. A poll conducted the week of July 17 by the Tel Aviv University Institute for Media, Society, and Politics shows that Israeli approval of the disengagement is at 48%; 43% of the respondents believe that Palestinian terrorism will increase following disengagement, versus 25% who believe that terrorism will decline.

On July 25, 2004, the "Human Chain", a rally of tens of thousands of Israelis to protest against the plan and for a national referendum took place. The protestors formed a human chain from Nisanit (later moved to Erez Crossing because of security concerns) in the Gaza Strip to the Western Wall in Jerusalem a distance of 90 km. On October 14, 2004, 100,000 Israelis marched in cities throughout Israel to protest the plan under the slogan "100 cities support Gush Katif and Samaria".

On August 10, 2005, in response to calls from Jewish religious leaders, including former Chief Rabbis Avraham Shapira, Ovadia Yosef, and Mordechai Eliyahu, between 70,000 (police estimate) and 250,000 (organizers' estimate) Jews gathered for a rally centered at the Western Wall in prayer to ask that the planned disengagement be cancelled. The crowds that showed up for the rally overwhelmed the Western Wall's capacity and extended as far as the rest of the Old City and surrounding Jerusalem neighborhoods. The prayer rally was the largest of its kind for over 15 years, since the opposition to the Madrid Conference of 1991. On August 11, 2005, between 150,000 (police estimates) and 300,000 (organizers' estimates) people massed in and around Tel Aviv's Rabin Square for an anti-disengagement rally. Organizers called the event "the largest expression of public protest ever held in Israel." According to a police spokesman, it was one of the largest rallies in recent memory.

A September 15, 2004, survey published in Maariv showed that:

- 69% supported a general referendum to decide on the plan; 26% thought that approval in the Knesset would be enough.
- If a referendum were to be held, 58% would vote for the disengagement plan, while 29% would vote against it.

Dov Weisglass was quoted in an interview with Israeli newspaper Haaretz on October 6, 2004, as saying that the disengagement would prevent a Palestinian state for years to come (see above). This incident has bolstered the position of critics of the plan that Sharon is intentionally trying to scuttle the peace process.

==== Palestinian ====
On August 8, 2005, Haaretz quoted a top Palestinian Authority religious cleric, Sheikh Jamal al-Bawatna, the mufti of the Ramallah district, in a fatwa (a religious edict) banning shooting attacks against Israeli security forces and settlements, out of concern they might lead to a postponement of the pullout. According to Haaretz, this is the first time that a Muslim cleric has forbidden shooting at Israeli forces.

On August 15, 2005, scenes of delight took place across the Arab world, following the long-ingrained suspicion that the disengagement would not take place.

=== Israeli media coverage ===
The Israeli media systematically overstated "the threat posed by those opposed to disengagement and emphasiz[ed] extreme scenarios", according to the Israeli media monitoring NGO Keshev ("Awareness"). Keshev's report states that:

throughout the weeks before the disengagement, and during the evacuation itself, the Israeli media repeatedly warned of potential violent confrontation between settlers and security forces. These scenarios, which never materialized, took over the headlines.

Based on Keshev's research, the Israeli print and TV media "relegated to back pages and buried deep in the newscasts, often under misleading headlines" items that "mitigat[ed] the extreme forecasts." Editors delivered "one dominant, ominous message: The Police Declares High Alert Starting Tomorrow, Almost Like a State of War" Channel 1 (main news headline, August 14, 2005)

"The discrepancy between the relatively calm reality emerging from most stories and the overall picture reflected in the headlines is evident in every aspect of the disengagement story: in the suppression of information about the voluntary collection of weapons held by the settlers in the Gaza Strip; in reporting exaggerated numbers of right-wing protesters who infiltrated the Strip before the evacuation; in misrepresentation of the purpose of settler protest (which was an exercise in public relations, not a true attempt to thwart the disengagement plan); and in playing down coordinated efforts between the Israeli security forces and the settlers."

The price for this misrepresentation was paid, at least in part, by the settlers, whose public image was radicalized unjustifiably. After the disengagement was completed without violence between Israelis and a sense of unity and pride pervaded society, "the media chose to give Israeli society, and especially its security forces, a pat on the back."

== See also ==
- Expulsions and exoduses of Jews
- Jordan's disengagement from the West Bank
- Palestinian rocket attacks on Israel
- Realignment plan
- Unsettled
- Israeli invasion of the Gaza Strip (2023–present)
- Proposed Israeli resettlement of the Gaza Strip
- October 7 attacks

== Bibliography ==
- Rynhold, Jonathan; Waxman, Dov (2008). "Ideological Change and Israel's Disengagement from Gaza". Political Science Quarterly. 123 (1): 11–37. doi:10.1002/j.1538-165X.2008.tb00615.x. JSTOR 20202970.has
- Cook, Jonathan (2006). Blood and Religion: The Unmasking of the Jewish and Democratic State. Pluto Press. ISBN 978-0-7453-2555-2.
- Podeh, Elie (2025). "Israel's 2005 Disengagement from Gaza: a multilateral move under unilateral façade". Middle Eastern Studies. 61 (5): 719–735. doi:10.1080/00263206.2025.2473990. ISSN 0026-3206.
