= Netzer Hazani =

Community settlement in central Israel

Netzer Hazani: נצר חזני (Hebrew)
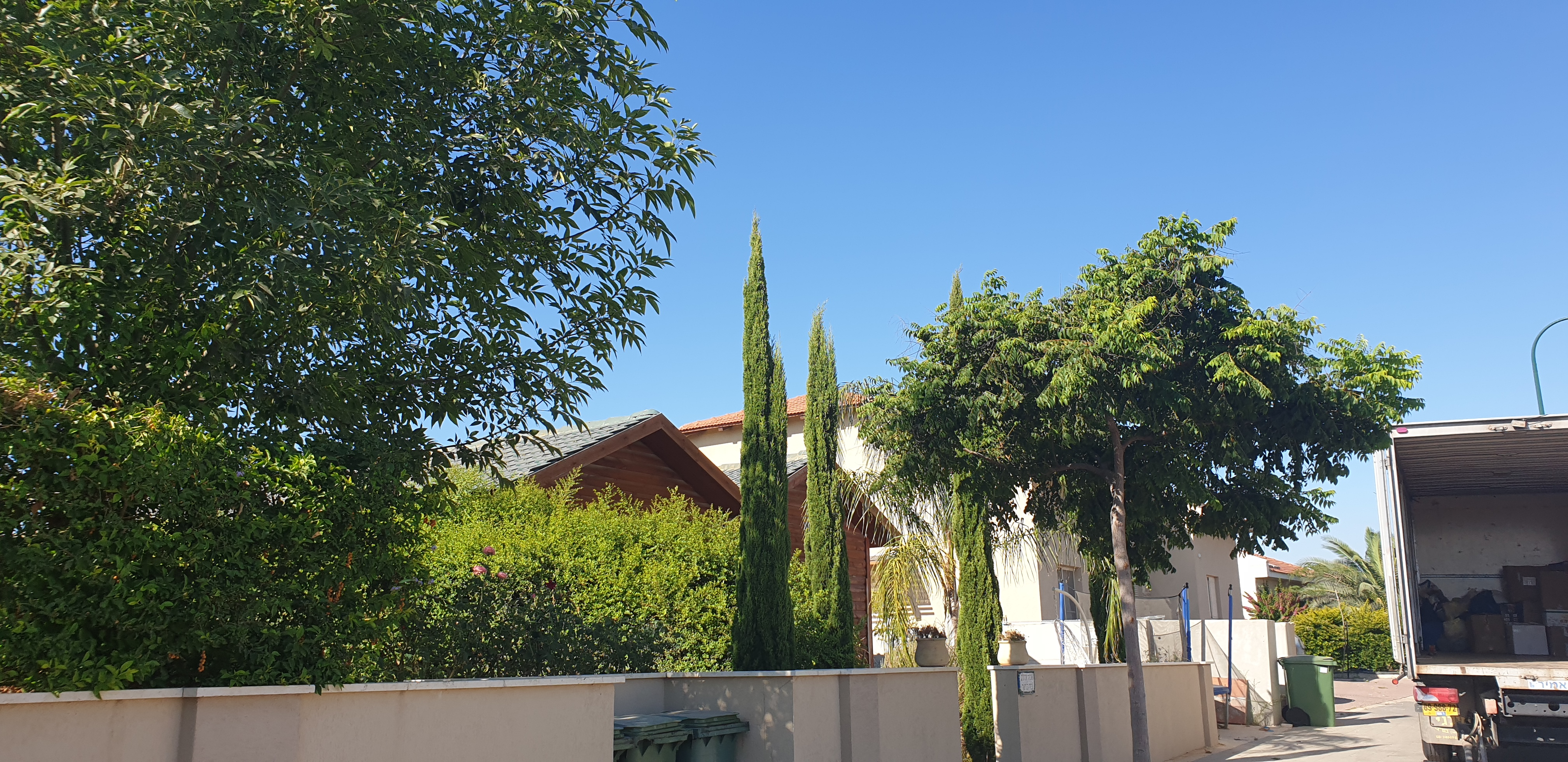

- Location within Jerusalem District
- Coordinates: 31°49′16″N 34°51′47″E
- Country: Israel
- District: Central
- Subdistrict: Rehovot
- Council: Nahal Sorek
- Affiliation: Hapoel HaMizrachi
- Founded: 2010
- Founder: Former Israeli settlers
- Population (2024): 626

Netzer Hazani (Hebrew: נצר חזני) is a community settlement in central Israel. It falls under the jurisdiction of Nahal Sorek Regional Council. In 2019 it had a population of 626.

== History ==
The village was established in 2010 near Yesodot by former settlers who had been expelled from the Gaza Strip as a result of the disengagement plan, and was named after the former settlement of the same name. It was officially recognized in 2013.
