= Hafetz Haim =

Kibbutz in south-central Israel

Hafetz Haim: חָפֵץ חַיִּים (Hebrew)
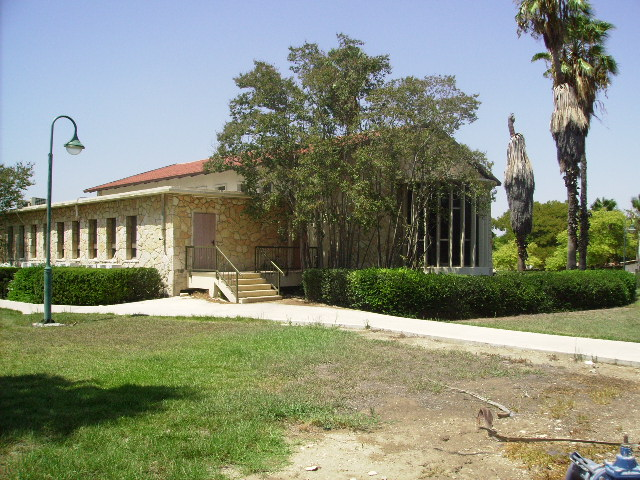
- Etymology: desirous of life
- Location within Central Israel Location within Israel
- Coordinates: 31°47′19″N 34°48′0″E
- Country: Israel
- District: Central
- Subdistrict: Rehovot
- Council: Nahal Sorek
- Affiliation: Poalei Agudat Yisrael
- Founded: 15 August 1937 (Kfar Szold); 25 April 1944 (Hafetz Haim)
- Founder: German Jews; Polish Agudat Yisrael Members
- Population (2024): 707

Hafetz Haim (Hebrew: חָפֵץ חַיִּים, lit. desirous of life) is a religious kibbutz in central Israel. Located in the Shephelah, it falls under the jurisdiction of Nahal Sorek Regional Council. In 2024 it had a population of 707.

== History ==
The land on which Hafetz Haim was established was purchased by the Jewish National Fund. The land was located near the Palestinian village of Al-Mukhayzin.

The first Jewish settlement was established there on 15 August 1937 as part of the tower and stockade movement. It was named Sha'ar HaNegev, "Gate of the Negev", and then Kfar Szold, "Szold Village" (after Henrietta Szold). However, on 13 November 1942 the community moved to the Finger of the Galilee, where they established a new kibbutz, also called Kfar Szold.

On 25 April 1944 a new kibbutz was established. The founders were religious pioneers from Germany and members of the Ezra youth movement and Agudat Yisrael who had been preparing near Kfar Saba. It was the first village founded by Poalei Agudat Yisrael and was named after rabbi Yisrael Meir Kagan, who was also known as the Hafetz Haim after one of his famous works with the title “Chofetz Chaim”, trans. Desirer of Life.

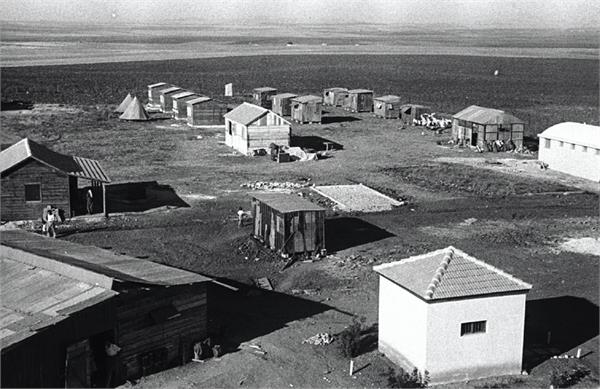
Hafetz Haim 1945

== Archaeology ==
In 2010, a Byzantine-era octagonal wine press measuring 6.5 meters by 16.5 meters was discovered in excavations near Kibbutz Hafetz Haim.
