= Nahal Sorek Regional Council =

Coordinates: 31°48′N 34°49′E

Nahal Sorek נחל שורק
- Regional council (from 1952)
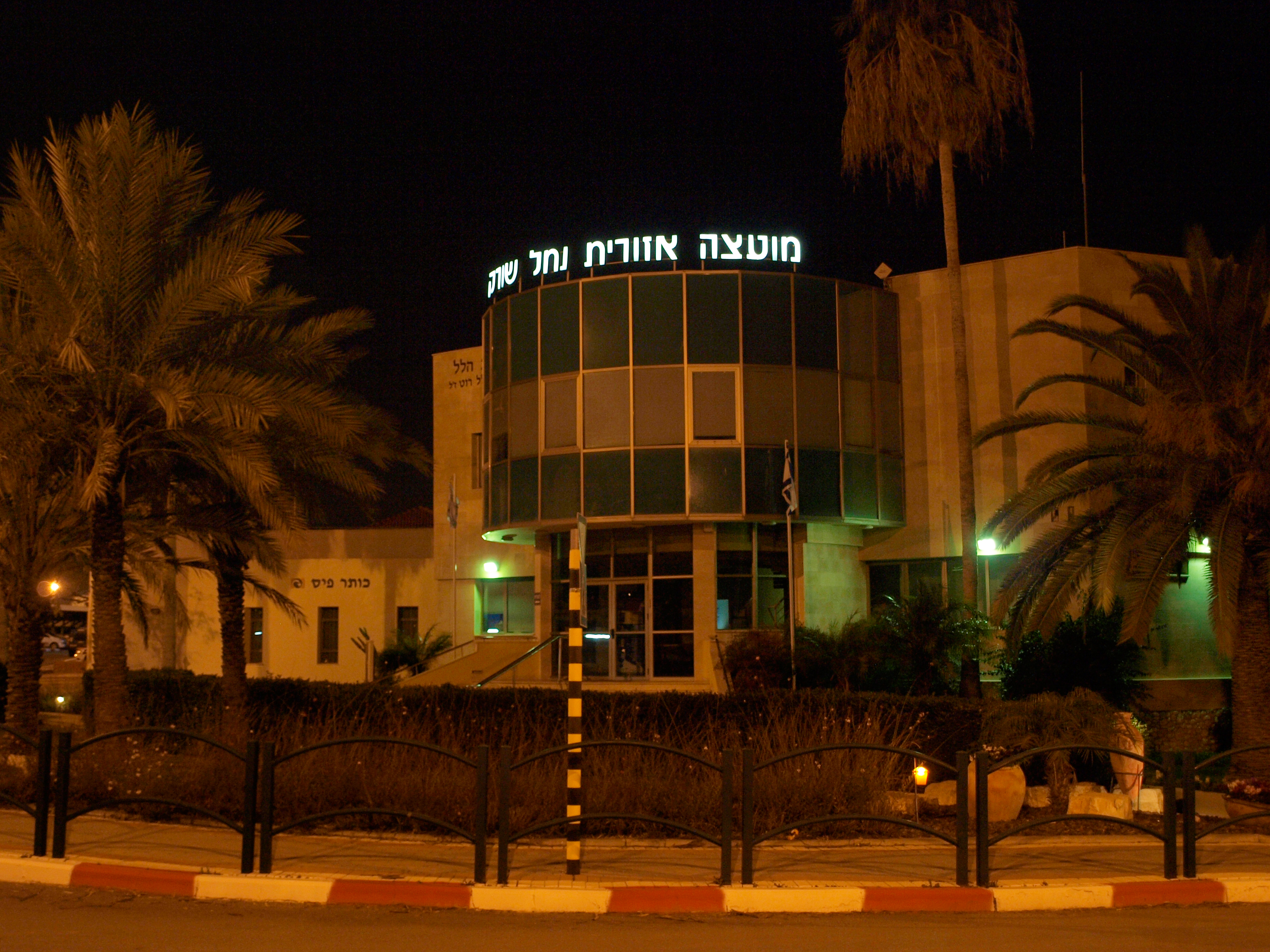
- Town hall of Nahal Sorek Regional Council
- Interactive map of Nahal Sorek
- Country: Israel
- District: Central
- Subdistrict: Rehovot
- Natural region: Rehovot

Government
  - Head of Municipality: Shai Raichner

Area
  - Total: 28,340 dunams (28.34 km^{2}; 10.94 sq mi)

Population (2024)
  - Total: 10,682
  - Density: 376.9/km^{2} (976.2/sq mi)
- Website: Official website

Nahal Sorek Regional Council (Hebrew: מועצה אזורית נחל שורק, Mo'atza Azorit Nahal Sorek) is a regional council in the Central District of Israel. The seat of the council is Yad Binyamin. The council is named for the Sorek stream.

== List of communities ==
This regional council provides various municipal services for a few settlements within its territory:

- Hafetz Haim (kibbutz)
- Bnei Re'em (moshav)
- Yesodot (moshav shitufi)
- Netzer Hazani (moshav)
- Beit Hilkia (moshav)
- Yad Binyamin (community settlement)
- Ganei Tal (moshav)

== Demographics ==
Historical population
Year	Pop.	±%
1972	1,200	—
1983	1,700	+41.7%
1995	2,100	+23.5%
2008	4,700	+123.8%
2022	10,204	+117.1%
2024	10,682	+4.7%

== Voting Patterns ==
In the 2022 election, 96 percent of voters in the regional council voted for the parties of the right-wing coalition led by Benjamin Netanyahu, while 4 percent voted for the parties of the center-left coalition led by Yair Lapid and no votes were cast for the Arab parties.

In the 2026 election, 87 percent of voters in the regional council voted for the parties of the right-wing coalition led by Benjamin Netanyahu, while 5 percent voted for the parties of the center-left coalition led by Gadi Eisenkot and no votes were cast for the Arab parties. An additional 1.6 percent voted for the Reservists, and 4.7 percent voted for Amcha Yisrael. Voter turnout increased 16 percent from the 2022 election.
