= Murder of Shalhevet Pass =

Killing of an Israeli baby during a Palestinian sniper attack in Hebron

- Part of the Second Intifada militancy campaign
- The attack site
- Native name: רצח שלהבת תחיה פס
- Location: 31°31′25″N 35°06′25″E; Avraham Avinu neighborhood, Hebron, West Bank
- Date: 26 March 2001; 25 years ago c. 4:00 pm (GMT+2)
- Attack type: Shooting attack
- Weapon: Sniper rifle
- Deaths: A ten-month-old Israeli infant (Shalhevet Pass)
- Perpetrator: Tanzim militant group
- Assailant: Mahmud Amru

The murder of Shalhevet Pass was a sniper shooting attack carried out by a Palestinian sniper in Hebron, West Bank, on 26 March 2001, during which a 10-month-old Israeli infant, Shalhevet Pass, had been killed. The event shocked the Israeli public, partly because it had been ruled that the sniper had deliberately aimed for the baby. According to Deborah Sontag of the New York Times, the murder became a "potent Israeli symbol as an innocent victim of the raging violence."

== The murder ==
At 4:00 pm on 26 March 2001, Shalhevet was shot in her stroller while accompanied by her parents from a parking lot by Hebron's Avraham Avinu neighborhood, where the family lived.

After a ten-minute lull, the Palestinian sniper resumed firing from the Abu Sneinah neighborhood on the hill opposite. Shalhevet was killed instantly; her mother grabbed her when she heard the gunshots, only to discover that the baby was already dead. One of the sniper's bullets penetrated the baby's head, passing through her skull, and hit her father as well. Shalhevet's father, Yitzchak Pass, a student, who had been pushing the stroller, was also seriously wounded minutes later by two bullets.

Press accounts indicated that the playground was very busy at the time, because a load of new sand had recently been delivered. According to unconfirmed accounts, another child was grazed by a bullet and two more had bullets pass through their clothing.

== Aftermath ==
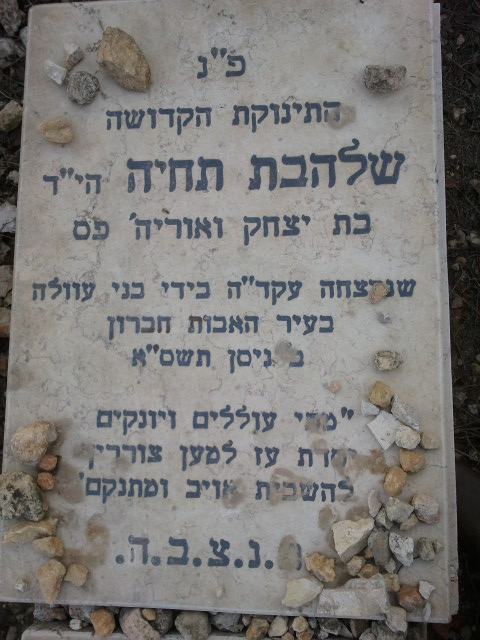
Tombstone of Shalhevet Pass

The murder, which occurred during the Second Intifada, produced vocal outrage in Israel and abroad. The nation mourned the killing of the baby.

Prime Minister Ariel Sharon condemned the attack and sent his condolences to the Pass family. Sharon also stated that he saw the Palestinian Authority as responsible for the attack. The Jewish community in Hebron demanded that the Israel Defense Forces (IDF) reoccupy the Abu Sneineh neighborhood, and the Pass family even stated that they would not bury their baby until the IDF did so.

=== Capture and trial of killer ===
The Palestinian Authority initially arrested the sniper, but released him after a short while. On 9 December 2002 the Shin Bet managed to capture the sniper—Tanzim member Mahmud Amru. In December 2004, a military court convicted the killer and sentenced him to three life terms.

According to the Israeli government, an investigation concluded that the sniper had intentionally targeted the baby. A spokesperson for Prime Minister Ariel Sharon said:

The fact that they could pick off the baby and then the father makes this a hideous, deliberate, cold-blooded murder. Snipers are not just gun-toting youth.... If Arafat had wanted, the sniper would not have been there.

In the verdict the judges expressed their shock of the brutality of the murder:

It was enough for one bullet, fired from a sniper rifle, to end the life of the infant Shalhevet Pass, who up to that event was unknown to the wide public, and just lived her life as all other children, until one day as the evening came she was hit in her head, and she died, and Shalhevet whom was still small and in her infant stage, was sentenced to death by a vile killer whom intentionally, using a Telescopic sight, pulled the trigger. The picture of the shot baby is on our table, is engraved in our minds and does not give peace to our souls. We cannot understand and we cannot accept the unbearable ease with which the killer decided to harm a helpless person.... We the judges are only humans and we cannot see anything else but the image which emerges in our senses, an image full of hate, blood and bereavement. We must not accept this image and we need to do everything we can to condemn it.

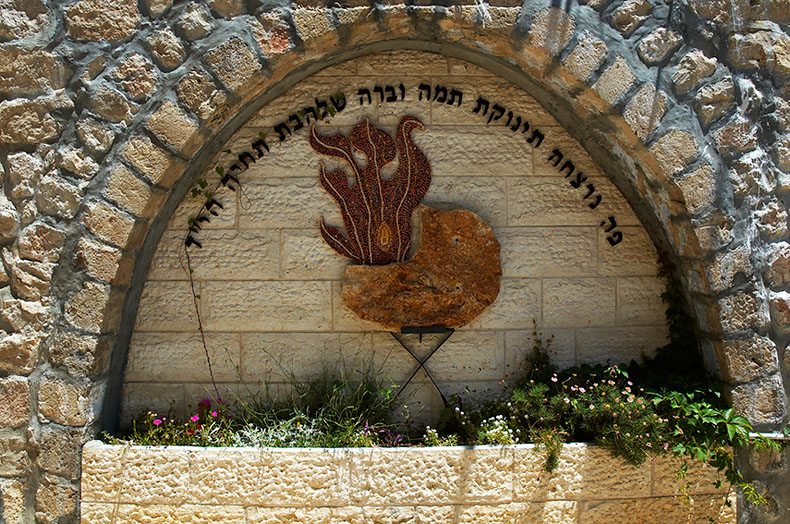
Memorial to Shalhevet Pass, Hebron

Yitzchak Pass, the child's father, later joined the Bat Ayin Underground terrorist group which planned to blow up a Palestinian girls' school in East Jerusalem. He was eventually arrested and convicted for possession of 10 pounds of explosive, consequently serving a two-year prison sentence.

=== Media reaction ===
The Associated Press ran the story with the headline "Jewish toddler dies in West Bank", and was criticized by Joshua Levy in his book The Agony of the Promised Land for downplaying the murder.

The Voice of Palestine, the Palestinian Authority's official radio station, reported that the report of the girl's shooting death was a lie, and that the girl's mother had murdered her own baby.

== In popular culture ==
A song was dedicated to the memory of "Baby Shalhevet", sung by Avraham Fried at a concert in Hebron. The song was written by Fried's brother, Rabbi Manis Friedman.

== See also ==
- Deaths of Asher and Yonatan Palmer
- Death of Yehuda Shoham
- Israeli–Palestinian conflict in Hebron
- Murder of Eliyahu Asheri
- Murder of Helena Rapp
- Murders of Koby Mandell and Yosef Ishran
- Murders of Neta Sorek and Kristine Luken
- Murder of Ofir Rahum
- Murder of Hatuel family
