= Murders of Koby Mandell and Yosef Ishran =

2001 murders of two Israeli teenagers

- The attack site
- Native name: רצח הנערים מתקוע
- Location: 31°38′40″N 35°14′08″E; Outskirts of the Israeli settlement of Tekoa
- Date: 8 May 2001; 25 years ago
- Attack type: Kidnapping, stabbing attack, stoning
- Deaths: 2 Israeli teenage civilians (Mandell and Ishran)

The murders of Koby Mandell and Yosef Ishran occurred on 8 May 2001, when two Jewish teenagers, Yaakov "Koby" Mandell and Yosef Ishran, were killed on the outskirts of the Israeli settlement of Tekoa in the West Bank, where they lived with their families. The identity of the killers has never been determined, though Israel and a number of sources state that unidentified Palestinian terrorists were responsible.

Koby Mandell was an Israeli-American, his family having emigrated from the United States to Israel in 1996, and the murders resulted in legislation by the U.S. Congress aimed at strengthening the U.S. response to the killing of Americans overseas. In response to his death, Koby's parents set up the Koby Mandell Foundation to provide support for families bereaved by terrorist attacks.

== Disappearance and discovery ==
Koby Mandell (Hebrew: קובי מנדל) and Yosef Ishran (Hebrew: יוסף איש-רן) were Israeli teens, 13 and 14 years old. Koby was a citizen of both the United States and Israel. The boys lived and attended school in the Israeli settlement of Tekoa, Gush Etzion, near the West Bank located Palestinian town of the same name variously referred to in English as Tuqu', Tekoa, and similar spellings. On 8 May 2001, the boys skipped school and went hiking in the Judean Desert surrounding their village. At first, their parents did not worry about the boys. They believed that they had gone to school, and then to Jerusalem to participate in a political demonstration. But when the boys did not come home by midnight, their parents informed the authorities.

The bodies of the two boys were discovered the next morning in a cave near the West Bank settlement where they lived. USA Today reported that, according to the police, both boys had "been bound, stabbed and beaten to death with rocks". The newspaper continued, "The walls of the cave in the Judean Desert were covered with the boys' blood, reportedly smeared there by the killers". CNN and the Irish Independent reported that "Israel's Channel Two TV said police believed there were at least three assailants who dipped their hands into the boys' blood after the killing and smeared it on the walls of the cave."

Miro Cohen, a sheep rancher described the scene to Time: "A rock the size of a computer rested on Kobi's smashed skull. Both bodies were covered with stones. Blood smeared the walls, and the dirt floor was muddy with it." The bodies were so badly mutilated and disfigured that dental records had to be used for positive identification.

The Jerusalem Post reported that police could not determine whether the boys had been killed outside the cave, or if their bodies were deposited in the cave after the murders. After forensic examination, the bodies, together with blood-stained rocks, were taken out of the cave. The boys' funeral was attended by thousands of people.

== Responsibility ==
Israeli police made several statements about responsibility for the murders. They were reported variously as stating that thieves, who stole 100 goats from Tekoa the same night, may have been responsible; that there was no clear link between the two crimes; and that there was no link. One police commander however expressed the view that there was "no doubt" the murders were committed "for nationalistic reasons". Police said the killings appeared to have taken place during a "chance encounter" rather than one that had been planned in advance. Israeli security forces arrested 20 Palestinians from nearby villages and imposed curfews and roadblocks in response to the attack.

A few of the many news agencies that reported about the murders said that an anonymous person claiming to represent an Islamic militant group telephoned one or more other news agencies to take responsibility. The Irish Independent reported that a call was made to Reuters, and that the call could not be authenticated but purportedly claimed revenge for the killing of an Islamic Jihad militant the previous Saturday as a motive. The Irish Independent did not name any particular group. The Jerusalem Post said in its day-after the event story that an anonymous caller to unnamed "foreign news agencies" had said he represented a group called "Hizbullah-Palestine" and that the boys were killed as revenge for the death of a four-month-old Palestinian baby, Iman Hiju, who became the youngest victim of violence when she was killed by an Israeli tank shell a few days previously. That death was apologized for by Ariel Sharon, who stressed that the "soldiers did not intend to kill her". A subsequent Jerusalem Post story, printed in 2008, suggested that the boys' killings might be attributable to "Bedouin shepherds".

Three books on terrorism that include compilations of terrorist attacks against Israel subsequently listed the murders as being attributable to Islamic Jihad and/or a "splinter group" of Hezbollah, called "Hizbullah-Palestine". Another source blames "a Palestinian mob". The Boston Globe reported that Israeli settlers, among other possible motives, suggested "a group of Palestinian youths had staked a claim on the cave during the seven months of violence, and that Israeli youths had been warned not to hike there." Most sources simply blame unidentified Palestinian terrorists. According to a 2004 U.S. Congressional report, there was never a "meaningful investigation or prosecution" of the case, and apparently, the perpetrators have yet to be apprehended.

== Reactions ==
The Israeli government condemned the killings. Ariel Sharon blamed the murder on the Palestinian Authority. Sharon said that Palestinian security forces do nothing to stop terrorists from murdering innocent civilians. He said that Palestinian TV was promoting violence "by broadcasting music videos filled with images of children throwing stones."

The Palestinian Authority condemned the killings. A spokesman for the Authority, Saeb Erekat said, "The Palestinian Authority regrets the loss of life of these two boys and all children, be it Israeli or Palestinian, Jewish, Muslim or Christian." He added that killing civilians on either side of the ongoing conflict is a crime, and that "the short way for peace and stability is finishing the Israeli occupation."

Yasser Arafat, President of the Palestinian National Authority, responded by blaming Israel for "victimizing Palestinian children". He cited the case of a three-month-old Palestinian girl, Reema Ahmed, wounded by gunfire the previous Wednesday during an Israeli attack on a Palestinian refugee camp.

In a statement referencing the murder of the two boys as well as the murder of ten-month-old Shalhevet Pass the previous month, Shlomo Riskin, a rabbi from Efrat, saw "a profound distinction" between "Israel and its enemies":

[I]f a child is killed by Israel, it is in an act of defense directed at a building where shots were fired at soldiers. In the case of Kobi and Yossi and Shalhevet, the enemy picked out innocent children to destroy them.

Ariel Sharon characterized the boys' deaths as a "horrific murder" and ordered a missile strike on Yasser Arafat's Fatah offices in Gaza City, in which 20 Palestinians were wounded.

U.S. State Department spokesman Richard Boucher called the killings of the Israeli boys "horrible, brutal". Pope John Paul II, speaking in Malta, said he was saddened by "news from the Holy Land of terrible violence even against innocent young people."

== Koby Mandell Act ==
As a result of the murders, several American legislators introduced the Koby Mandell Act, which reprimanded the State Department for, as it said, not doing enough about Palestinian terrorists who had harmed American citizens, and which would create an Office of Justice for Victims of Overseas Terrorism in the Department of Justice. The legislation was spearheaded by Sarah Stern, currently with the Endowment for Middle East Truth and formerly the lobbyist for the Zionist Organization of America, but was not a priority of other Jewish groups, who said that it did more to reprimand the State Department rather than support counter-terrorism: by targeting only Palestinian terrorists, they said, it was too narrow in its scope and would not, for example, have been able to deal with the murder of Daniel Pearl. The provisions of the law which created the office were eventually incorporated into a 2004 omnibus spending bill.

== The Koby Mandell Foundation and comedy shows ==
The mission of the Koby Mandell Foundation, set up by his parents Seth and Sherri Mandell, is to "work to bridge the isolation that bereaved children and adults are struck with after the loss of a loved one." Leonard A. Cole, in his book Terror: how Israel has coped and what America can learn, writes that Koby's parents are determined "to take the cruelty of Koby's murder and transform it into kindness." Both Seth and Sherri Mandell reject responding to violence with violence. Seth Mandell says that "Throwing stones at Arab houses makes us as bad as the Arabs, and is not an intelligent response." Urging against the violence he says: "There's plenty of stuff that can be done that is non-violent and makes a point." Sherri Mandell says that "Revenge, to her, means they have won". Koby's parents organized comedy shows to commemorate the memory of their son, who they say loved jokes.

== See also ==
- 2014 kidnapping and murder of Israeli teenagers
- Murder of Asher and Yonatan Palmer
- Killing of Yehuda Shoham
- Crime in Washington, D.C.
- List of solved missing person cases (2000s)
- Murder of Eliyahu Asheri
- Murder of Helena Rapp
- Murders of Neta Sorek and Kristine Luken
- Murder of Shalhevet Pass
