= Murder of Eliyahu Asheri =

Terrorist attack carried out by Palestinian militants

- Native name: רצח אליהו אשרי
- Location: West Bank
- Date: 25 June 2006; 20 years ago
- Attack type: Kidnapping, Shooting attack
- Deaths: Eliyahu Asheri
- Perpetrator: Popular Resistance Committees claimed responsibility
- No. of participants: 3

The murder of Eliyahu Asheri was an attack carried out on 25 June 2006, in which Palestinian Popular Resistance Committees (PRC) militants kidnapped, and later murdered the 18-year-old Israeli settler and high school student Eliyahu Asheri.

The attack occurred only a few hours after the capture of Corporal Gilad Shalit that led to Operation Summer Rains.

== Background ==
Eliyahu Asheri
- Born: 2 February 1988; Itamar, West Bank
- Disappeared: 25 June 2006 (aged 18); On his way from Beitar Illit to Neveh Tzuf
- Died: 25 June 2006 (aged 18); Beitunia, Palestinian territories
- Cause of death: Shot to death
- Body discovered: 29 June 2006
- Citizenship: Israeli
- Known for: Abducted and killed by PRC militants.

Eliyahu Pinchas Asheri (Hebrew: אליהו פנחסי אשר; 2 February 1988 – 25 June 2006) was an Israeli student from the settlement of Itamar, in the northern West Bank. He was a student at the religious pre-army Mechina (preparatory program) "Elisha" in Neveh Tzuf. His father Yitro Asheri, originally from Adelaide, was converted by St Kilda's Rabbi Philip Heilbrunn in 1986. Yitro Asheri had moved from the Adelaide suburb of Glenelg to the Jewish centre of North Adelaide at the time of his conversion. About six months after his conversion he moved to Israel. He first settled in kibbutz Sde Eliyahu where he learned some Hebrew and later moved to a yeshiva headed by Rabbi Haim Druckman. The Asheri family were one of the founding members of Itamar and have lived there from 1991.

== Kidnapping and murder ==
On Sunday, 25 June 2006, Eliyahu was kidnapped while on his way from Beitar Illit to Neveh Tzuf, northwest of Ramallah.

On Tuesday, 27 June 2006, Eliyahu's father, Yitro Asheri, initially submitted a missing-person report about his son to the Ariel Police. According to Yitro he did not report his son's absence for two days because Eliyahu used to regularly disappear for extended periods in the past without keeping daily contact with his parents. Asheri was last seen on 9:00 pm Sunday night, after he left the home of a friend in Betar Illit and was hitchhiking near the French Hill intersection of Jerusalem by one of his classmates.

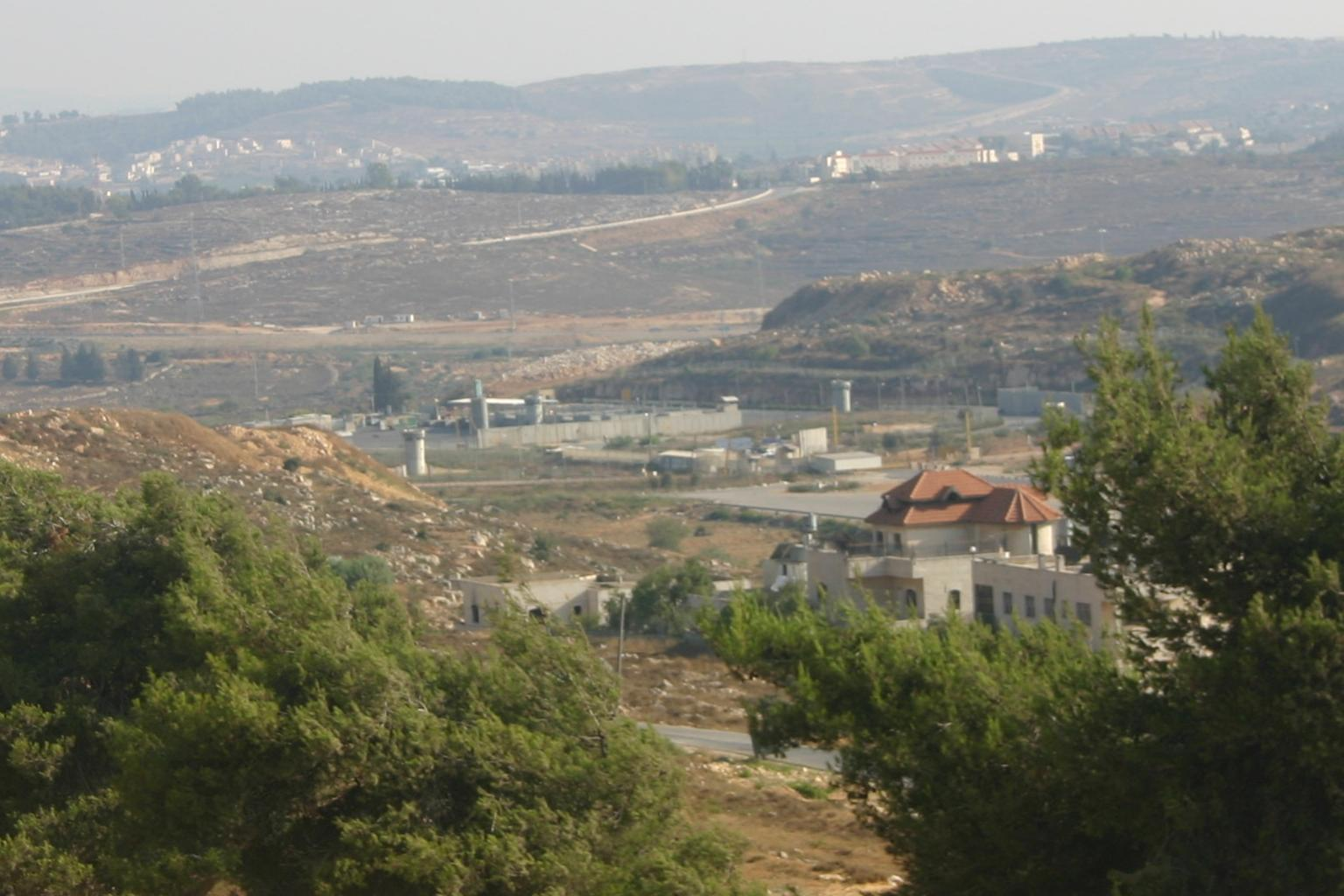
Asheri's body was found on 29 June 2006 in an open field near the village of Beitunia

In addition, on Tuesday, the Palestinian militant group Popular Resistance Committees initially announced that the group has kidnapped a Jewish settler in the West Bank.

On Wednesday, 28 June, Abu Abir, the spokesman for the Popular Resistance Committees, stated that Asheri would be "butchered in front of TV cameras" if Israel did not suspend its Operation Summer Rains into the Gaza Strip, which took place is in response to the kidnapping of Israel Defense Forces (IDF) corporal Gilad Shalit. Later on that day the Popular Resistance Committees stated that Asheri was slain.

Around 2:30 am on 29 June, the IDF recovered the body of Asheri which had been buried in an open field near the village of Beitunia, not far from Ramallah. Asheri's body was later transferred to the Abu Kabir Forensic Institute for a forensic investigation. The forensic investigation revealed that Asheri was shot to death by a bullet to the head from close range, possibly the same day on which he was abducted. The IDF had been led to the site by the Palestinian militant Wasam Abu Ragila, who was a prime suspect of the murder of Asheri, who had been arrested on Wednesday by the Israeli police anti-terror unit and IDF troops and who confessed in his investigation about his part in the kidnapping and murder of Asheri and gave specific details about the location of Asheri's body.

== Perpetrators ==
The Popular Resistance Committees claimed responsibility for the attack and presented Asheri's ID card. A Shin Bet investigation revealed that the abduction was carried out by a Tanzim terror cell connected with the PRC in Ramallah on instruction from the PRC leadership in Gaza.

== Burial ==
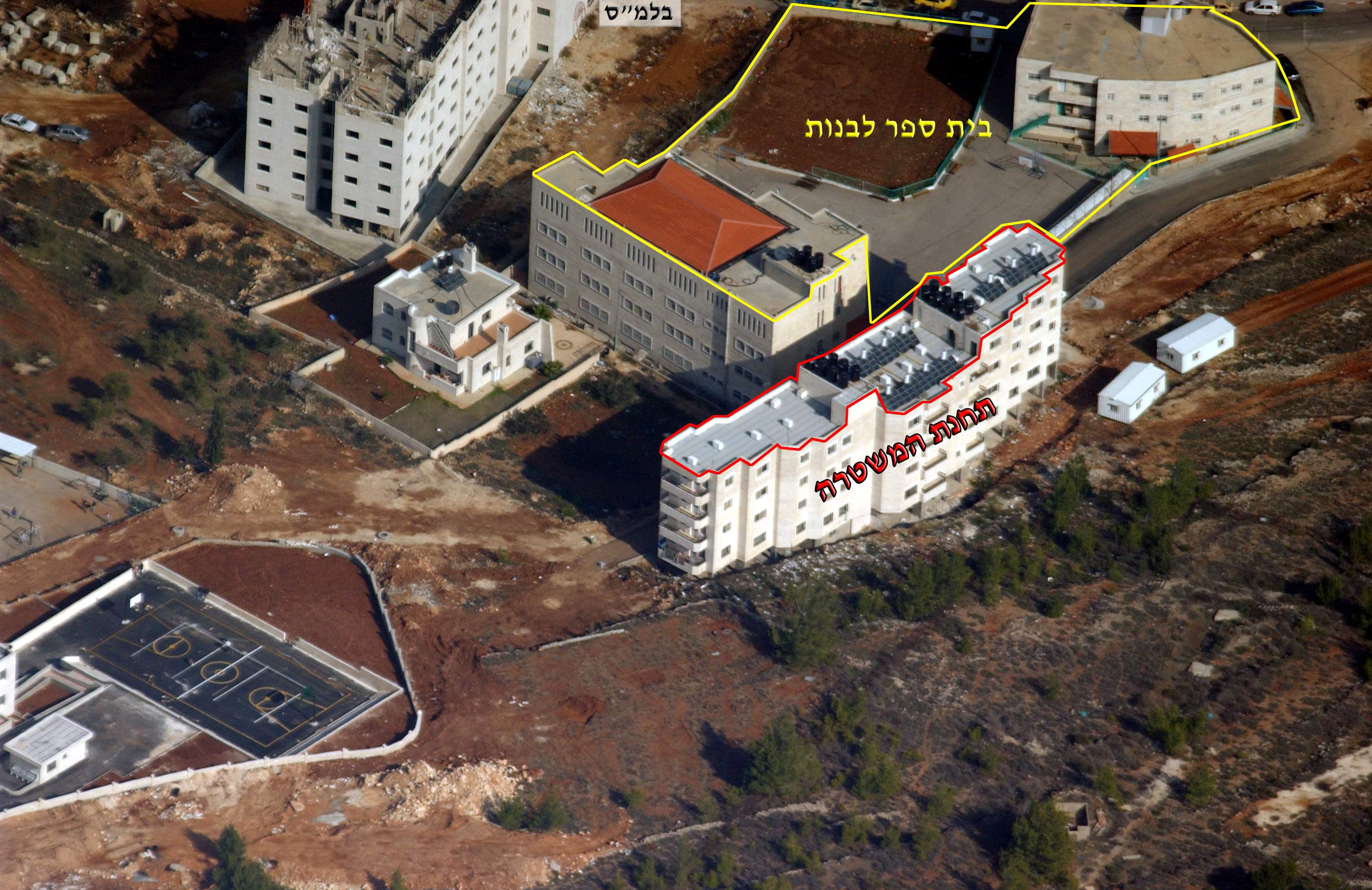
Three of the murderers hid in a Palestinian police station before being arrested by IDF forces. This aerial photo shows their location.

Thousands attended Asheri's funeral which was held on the same day his body was found, during the afternoon on the Mount of Olives Jewish cemetery in Jerusalem. The Chief Sephardic Rabbi Shlomo Amar eulogized Asheri in his funeral.

== Aftermath ==
On the morning of 4 July 2006, during a joint operation conducted by the IDF and the Israel Security Authorities, the three Tanzim militants whom murdered Eliyahu Asheri and whom were hiding in the a Palestinian Police headquarters building in Ramallah, were apprehended after a three-hour standoff. The three men were Bassam Shafik Atiya Ahtiya, Khamze Salah Taktuk, and Ayham Fuab Nayef Kamamji. All three were reported to be members of the Al Aqsa Martyrs Brigades and had been serving in the security forces of the Palestinian Authority.

On 1 January 2007 Kamamji was sentenced to two life sentences for the murder of Eliyahu Asheri. In August 2021, he escaped from prison as part of the Gilboa Prison break but was recaptured two weeks later.

== See also ==
- 2014 kidnapping and murder of Israeli teenagers
- Murder of Helena Rapp
- Murder of Shalhevet Pass
- Murder of Koby Mandell and Yosef Ishran
- Murder of Ofir Rahum
- Murder of Tali Hatuel and her four daughters
