= Killing of Binyamin Meisner =

Killing of Israeli by Palestinian terrorists

On 24 February 1989, in Nablus, Palestinians dropped a cement block on the head of Binyamin Meisner (Hebrew: בנימין מייסנר), killing him. Binyamin Meisner (also spelled Benjamin Meisner, Ben Meisner, Benny Meisner, Benjamin Mizner, or Biniamín Meisner) was serving as a staff sergeant in the Israel Defense Forces. He was the fifth Israeli soldier killed in the First Intifada.

== Background ==
During the First Intifada, violent demonstrations took place in Nablus after a funeral cortege was fired on by Israeli troops on 18 December 1988. Two Palestinians were killed, and another eight were killed when Israeli troops put down the resulting protests. The city was then placed under a curfew for six days. Over 31 Palestinians were killed and a thousand wounded from Israeli fire, directed at crowds, by 16 January 1989.

== Incident ==
Meisner, a 25-year-old paratrooper on reserve duty, was killed when a concrete block was thrown at him from a building in Nablus, as he took part in a patrol attempting to disperse Palestinians demonstrating in Nablus's open air market. Meisner's skull was crushed by the impact.

Journalist Stephen Franklin of the Chicago Tribune described Nablus, where Meisner was killed, as one of the "most militant" towns in the West Bank, writing that "rocks, stones and huge hunks of metal" were regularly "dropped" on Israeli soldiers "from rooftops as they patrol alleys covered with freshly painted slogans urging on the uprising." The week before Meisner was killed, Israeli troops shot "a young Arab who was poised to throw a concrete block down on them from a roof in the market in Nablus on Thursday night."

Meisner was from the town of Kiryat Tivon. He had immigrated to Israel from Argentina with his family as a child. He was buried in Kiryat Tivon.

=== Perpetrators ===
Six Arabs were tried by an Israeli court for murder and convicted in July 1989. Ommar Mohammad Kalabuna (Amar Muhamed Khanis Kalbune), a 19-year-old alleged to have participated in the killing, was himself killed in clashes between Arabs and Israelis in Nablus in September 1989. Ibrahim Taktuk and Samir Na’anish (Samir Al-Nanish), a "Fatah activist", were tried and sentenced to prison for life. Their houses were demolished by the Israeli military, as was the house from which the concrete block that killed Meisner was taken, even though according to B'Tselem inhabitants were not involved in the incident.

Prosecutors argued for life sentences on the grounds that killing Meisner by dropping a large object onto him was a more heinous crime than the killing of Esther Ohana by throwing rocks at the car in which she was riding, a crime for which the perpetrators were sentenced to 11 to 13 years in prison.

Samir Na’anish (Samir Al-Nanish; Samir Na’neesh) was released from prison in 2013.

Taktuk Ibrahim (Taqtuq Lutfi Halma Ibrahim) was released from prison in December, 2013.

==== Response to prisoner release ====
According to the official Palestinian Authority daily, Al-Hayat Al-Jadida, the Palestinian Authority "honored" Samir Al-Nanish and his fellow released prisoners upon their arrival in Nablus with a "reception ceremony" attended by Fatah Central Committee Member Tawfiq Tirawi. Speaking at the ceremony Mahmoud Al-Aloul, a Fatah Central Committee Member, congratulated Al-Nanish and the other prisoners on their release.

Palestinian Authority President Mahmoud Abbas stated that none of the released West Bank prisoners would be sent to Gaza, although Israel claimed that the Palestinian Authority would confine some of the released prisoners to Gaza. Abbas personally greeted 18 of the released prisoners in Ramallah, shaking hands with each and calling them, "our hero prisoners".

Ibrahim's cousin, Hamza Taqtouq, told journalists that his cousin "and all the prisoners are our heroes... We are proud of them."

The prisoner releases were controversial; demonstrations opposing them were held in Israel, but the Israeli High Court rejected a petition intended to keep the militants prisoner.

=== Commentary on incident ===
Stephen Flatow, writing in the Algemeiner Journal in 2014, described rocks thrown by Palestinian youth as "terrorist weapons", pointing out that 11 people have been killed by Palestinians throwing rocks at Israelis; he characterized stone-throwing by Palestinian youth acts of "attempted murder", pointing out that when a group of youths in Washington, D.C. threw rocks at passing cars, they were convicted of "assault with intent to murder", and "each sentenced to 40 years in prison".

In her book, Conscience at War, psychology professor Ruth Linn relates a story told to her by an Israeli who chose to immigrate to Australia rather than to continue to serve in the army. According to the former soldier, he was patrolling during the First Intifada, near the spot where Meisner had been killed when he saw a 4-year-old child standing on a rooftop beside a concrete block that had been placed on the roof for the child to push onto the patrol as it passed. The soldier shouted at the child, causing him to push the block too soon, before the soldiers were underneath.

== Impact ==
According to the Los Angeles Times, this killing, along with an incident on the previous day in which Lebanese militiamen killed three Palestinian commandos attempting to enter Israel with the intention of carrying out attacks, derailed incipient reconciliation between Israel and the PLO.

The city of Nablus was put under curfew for ten days as Israeli troops conducted house-to-house searches for Meisner's killers; the curfew was lifted after arrests were made.

A group of 6 Arabs was convicted of the killing in July 1989. Ommar Mohammad Kalabuna (Amar Muhamed Khanis Kalbune), a 19-year-old "said to have participated in the killing" was himself killed in clashes between Palestinian demonstrators and Israeli soldiers in Nablus in September, 1989. Ibrahim Taktuk and Samir Na’anish (Samir Al-Nanish) were tried and sentenced to life in prison. Their houses were demolished by the Israeli military, as was the house from which the concrete block that killed Meisner was thrown, even though its inhabitants were not involved in the incident.

Samir Na’anish (Samir Al-Nanish; Samir Na’neesh) was released from prison in 2013. Demonstrations in Israel protested against his release along with that of other Palestinians convicted of murder.

Taktuk Ibrahim (Taqtuq Lutfi Halma Ibrahim) was released from prison in December, 2013.
