= Teneh Omarim =

Israeli settlement in the West Bank

Teneh Omarim: טנא עומרים (Hebrew)
- Community settlement
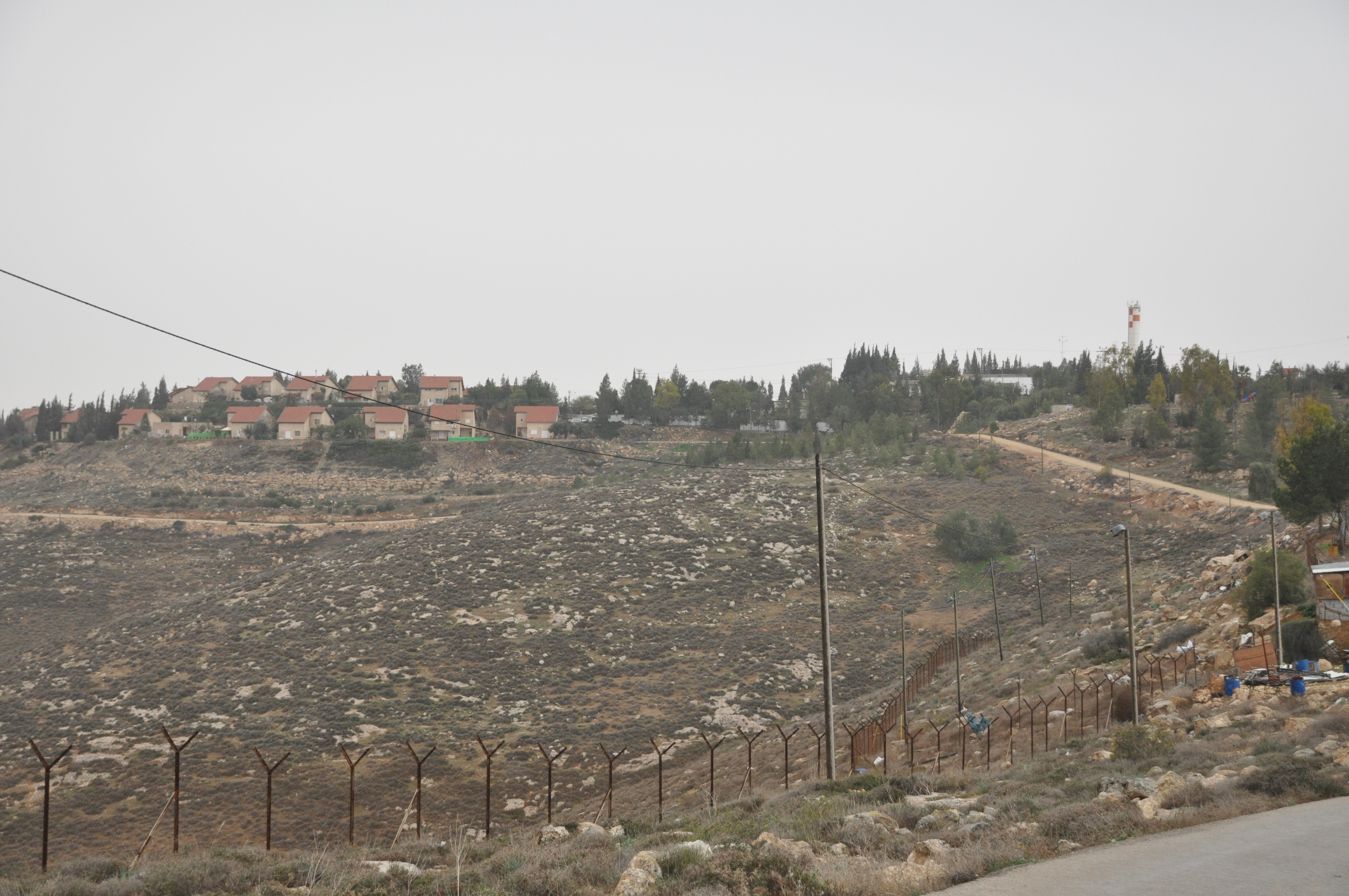

- Location within the Southern West Bank Location within the West Bank
- Coordinates: 31°22′31″N 34°57′25″E
- Country: Palestine
- District: Judea and Samaria Area
- Council: Har Hevron
- Region: West Bank
- Affiliation: Amana
- Founded: 1983
- Founder: Nahal
- Population (2024): 1,089
- Website: http://www.omarim.org/

Teneh Omarim (Hebrew: טנא עומרים) also known as Tene, Omarim, or Ma'ale Omarim, is an Israeli settlement organized as a community settlement in the West Bank. Located east of the Israeli West Bank barrier, 2.3 kilometers from the Green line in the southern Hebron Hills just north of Meitar, it falls under the jurisdiction of Har Hevron Regional Council. In 2024, it had a population of 1,089.

The international community considers Israeli settlements in the West Bank illegal under international law, but the Israeli government disputes this.

== History ==
It was established in 1983 as a Nahal settlement under the name "Nahal Omarim" and civilianized in 1984. "Tene Omarim" is the name of the settlement used by its residents, the Israeli government considers "Tene" the official name as a tribute to David Taneh, the first CEO of the Building and Housing Office. It was established immediately after the Killing of Esther Ohana, the first Israeli killed by a Palestinian stone-throwing attack.

The settlement has a total area of about 366 square meters, of which 18.84 percent is privately owned, all or most of it by Palestinians according to a 2006 Peace Now-report. Settlements on privately owned Palestinian land are illegal under Israeli law. In 2005, as a part of the Israeli disengagement from Gaza, Teneh Omarim absorbed 13 families from the evacuated Gaza Strip settlements of Morag and Gush Katif.
