= Death of Adele Biton =

2013 Palestinian stone throwing attack

- Part of the Israeli–Palestinian conflict
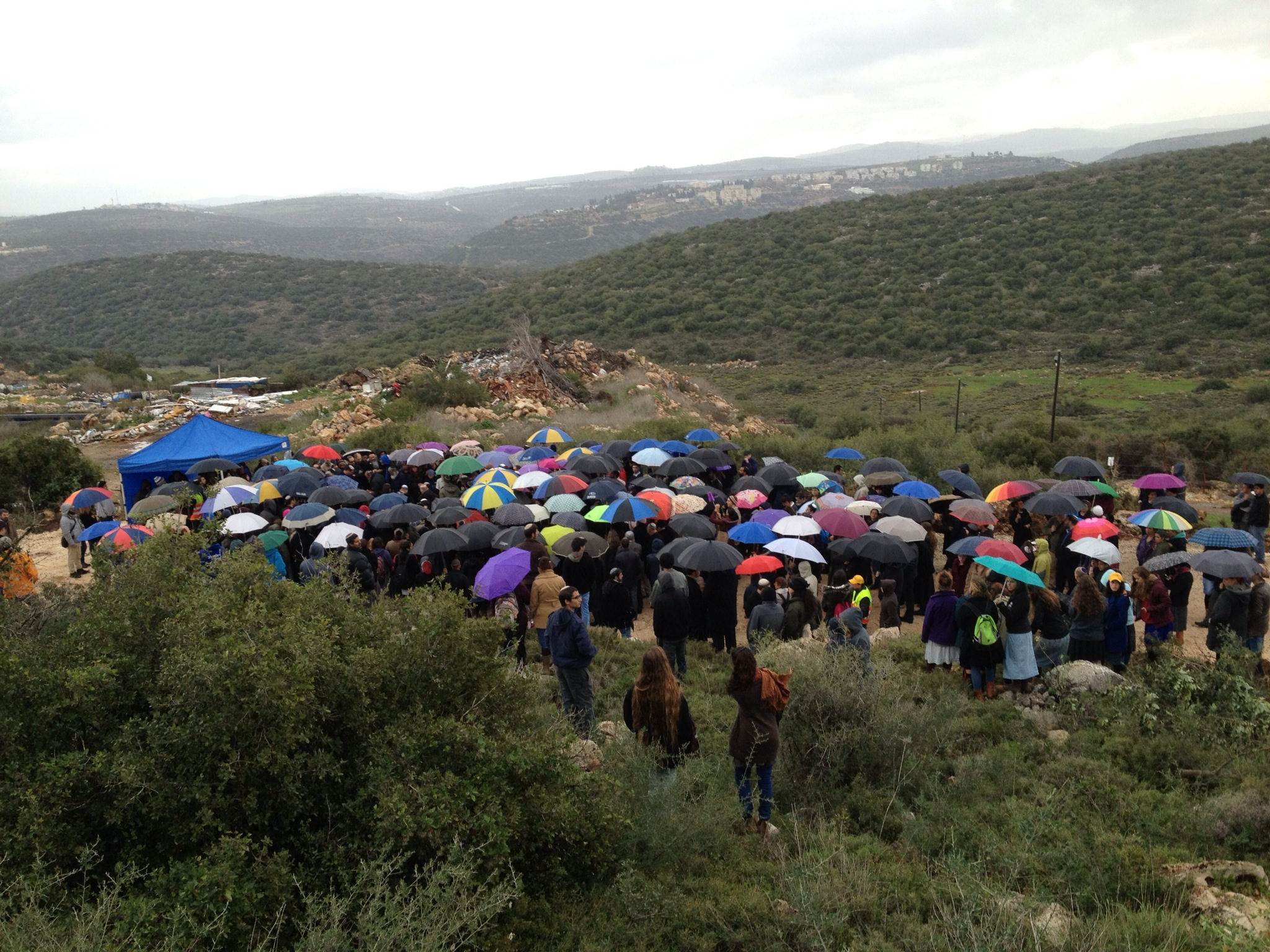
- Adele Biton Funeral. 18 February 2015.
- Location: Near Kifl Haris, West Bank
- Date: 14 March 2013; 13 years ago
- Attack type: Stone throwing on civilian car
- Weapon: Projectiles (stones)
- Deaths: 1 civilian
- Perpetrator: Five Palestinians

The death of Adele Biton occurred on 17 February 2015 as a consequence of a 14 March 2013 Palestinian stone-throwing attack which caused the civilian vehicle in which the 2 year old infant Adele was riding to crash.

== Incident ==
On 14 March 2013, Adele, with her mother Adva and two sisters, Avigail and Naama, were in a car driving on Route 5 between the Israeli settlement of Yakir and Tel Aviv, where the family had visited a grandmother. The Biton family were driving on Route 5 towards Tel Aviv. Palestinians were throwing stones at vehicles on the road at the time. They were targeted by rock-throwers, and the car spun out of control and smashed into a truck which was parked on the side of the road, having stopped for similar reasons. The first health aide to arrive on the scene was a Palestinian volunteer paramedic, Muawiya Qabha, who gave immediate assistance. Soon afterwards he was joined by an Israeli doctor who happened to be driving by, who examined Adele and pronounced her clinically dead. Qabha, convinced he could save her life, continued to work on her, and after a considerable time, the girl began to respond. The child had suffered severe head injuries as a result of the crash and was hospitalized at the Rabin Medical Center's Schneider Children's Medical Center for emergency surgery. She remained semi-comatose for two months, and was released to return to the family home.

Adele never recovered from her injuries. According to The New York Times, Adele, "Biton, became a potent national symbol of the dangers that stones can cause". According to The New York Times reporter Jodi Rudoren, Adele was "among the victims who become somewhat iconic... Many, many articles were written about her."

Biton is remembered as one of several people injured and killed as a result of Palestinian rock-throwing at passing vehicles. Others who have suffered the same fate include Esther Ohana, a 20-year-old girl who was driving to her wedding rehearsal when she was murdered, eleven-year-old Chava Wechsberg, and Asher Palmer, a young father murdered along with his eleven-month-old son.

== Arrests ==
Five Palestinian teenagers, Muhammad Mahdi Suleiman, Tamer Ayyad Ahmad Souf, Ammar Abd al-Nayif Souf, Ali Yassin Ali Shamlawi and Muhammad Jumaa Muhammad Kleib, from Kfar Haras were arrested for throwing the rocks that caused the crash. They were charged with having thrown stones on that road that day. 20 drivers driving on that route during the day later filed insurance claims for damages to their vehicles, but no eyewitnesses, according to Ma'an News Agency, were forthcoming, and no police station received complaints at the time. All five eventually confessed but retracted their statements in court, stating that their admissions had been extracted after repeated abuse under interrogation. In December 2015, all 5 were sentenced to 15 years in prison and fined $7,700.
