= Murder of Asher and Yonatan Palmer =

Terrorist incident in the West Bank

- Part of the Israeli–Palestinian conflict
- The attack site
- Location: 31°35′23″N 35°06′58″E; Kiryat Arba, West Bank
- Date: 23 September 2011; 15 years ago c. 10:00 pm (UTC+2)
- Weapon: Projectiles (stones)
- Deaths: 2 civilians
- No. of participants: 2 Palestinians

The murder of Asher and Yonatan Palmer occurred on 23 September 2011, when a Palestinian stone throwing attack caused Asher, aged 24, to lose control of a vehicle he was driving near the Israeli settlement of Kiryat Arba in the West Bank, killing him and his infant son. Initially thought to be an accident, it was later deemed a terrorist attack by the Israel Police.

Two Palestinians confessed to the attack; a third, who stole from Asher's body, was convicted of theft.

== Biography ==
Asher and Yonatan Palmer (Hebrew: אשר ויונתן פלמר) were from the Israeli settlement of Kiryat Arba in the West Bank. Asher Palmer's parents are American immigrants to Israel, and he held US citizenship through them. He did his national service in the Israel Defense Forces as part of the hesder program, combining military service with religious studies, doing his service in the Israeli Navy, and was discharged several months before his death. At the time of his death, he was studying at the Jerusalem College of Engineering. After his death, the college started a scholarship fund named after him and his son dedicated to helping religious students support their families while studying. His infant son, Yonatan, who was killed with him, was two days short of his first birthday.

Asher Palmer's wife, Puah, is a nurse at Shaare Zedek Medical Center, and was pregnant at the time of his death. She gave birth to a girl five months after the attack.

== The attack ==
Asher and Yonatan Palmer were travelling by car along Highway 60 near Kiryat Arba to join Palmer's pregnant wife in Jerusalem. Two Palestinians hurled stones from their car which caused the death of Asher Palmer and his son after their car overturned. Asher Palmer's face was crushed in the lip region and he sustained fractures to his skull.

After the attack, a Palestinian driver, Shehada Awad Shehada Shatat, was driving on Highway 60 and observed the attack and car crash. He did not call for medical aid or attempt to help the victims but stole Asher's handgun from his body. The family of Asher and Yonatan Palmer stated that Asher's wallet was also stolen.

== Police investigation ==
The police initially believed the deaths of Asher Palmer and his son were accidental and a result of driver error. However, they later concluded that the deaths were caused by rocks thrown at their vehicle and classified the incident as a terror attack. The Defense Ministry stated that the dead would be recognized as terror victims.

The attack was investigated by a Hebron District police force that dealt with incidents of rocks being hurled at Israeli vehicles from moving cars, this being the 18th case of such attacks. Investigators found a hole in the car's windshield consistent with a rock's entry point. Three rocks were found in the car, and one of them blood-stained, analysis determining that it was human blood. The fractures to Palmer's skull and facial injuries were also assessed and an autopsy on Asher Palmer's body revealed injuries consistent with rock projectile.

The police were criticized for their initial report of the attack. Settlement leaders said that the police had denied that this was a terror attack to maintain the public order. Minister of the Knesset, Michael Ben Ari, said that the police were fearful of violent protests and the brother-in-law of Asher, Aharon Peretz suggested that the police did not describe this as a terror attack so as not to "fan the flames" and said of Asher, "He never fought with anyone. He was a quiet and special man and this is a great loss."

The mayor of Kiryat Arba, Malachi Levinger, called on the security forces to stop the stone-throwing which endangered lives. He said, "There are tens of thousands of Jews driving to Hebron to pray these days, and their safety must be protected," Danny Dayan demanded the publication of the report saying the public, the media or the bereaved family had not been informed of the true events and that the murder had been covered up.

== Funeral ==
Many people assembled in a parking lot in Kiryat Arba pay their respects to the deceased. After the eulogies finished, the bodies of Asher and Yonatan, wrapped in a tiny prayer shawl, were carried by mourners to a vehicle in which they were transported to Hebron for burial.

== Arrests, trials, murder conviction ==
Two Palestinian men from Halhul, Wa'al al-Arjeh and Ali Saadeh, were arrested for the murders of Asher and Yonatan Palmer following an investigation by the Israel Police, Shin Bet, and the IDF. They admitted to hurling the rock which caused the deaths. The rock was thrown at the victims' car from a vehicle speeding in the opposite direction, thereby significantly increasing the force of impact.

After police examined the possibility that the two were responsible for 17 other cases involving stones being hurled at Israeli vehicles and the prosecution, the prosecution indicted the men for other stone-throwing attacks, one of them who was charged with attempted murder in another case, in which he allegedly threw rocks at a bus to kill passengers. Three other Palestinian men were indicted in connection to the Palmers' deaths who allegedly formed cell to target Israeli civilians.

Monitors from the US Department of State attended pre-trial hearings of the suspects at the Ofer Military Court, and representatives from the US Department of Justice and US Department of State attended the trial, due to the victims having American citizenship.

Asher Palmer's brother, Moshe, said, "I have never felt the need for revenge but I'm glad they were arrested", he added. "Why they did what they did – is no great secret. It doesn't make the pain any easier, but it's good that a relatively short time after the incident, they managed to apprehend the people. I believe that those responsible for catching these people have done their job properly."

On 24 April 2013, Arjeh was convicted by a panel of three judges of intentional murder and sentenced to two life terms and an additional 58 years.

Shehada Awad Shehada Shatat was convicted of stealing Palmer's gun moments immediately after his death and received a 10-month prison sentence and a ₪1,000 fine ($USD 280). The prosecution appealed against the leniency of the sentence. Asher Palmer's father, Michael, said that military court had ignored the rights of the victims as he had not been informed of the sentencing hearing and consequently did not provide a victim impact statement for the court to assess. He said, "Shatat saw the attack, saw Asher and Yonatan die, maintained chilling presence of mind as he looked into the just-dead faces of a father and his infant son and then proceeded to desecrate Asher's still warm body to find and steal the weapon. Shatat may very well have literally had Asher's blood on his hands."

The Court of Appeals later considered the victim impact statements and increased the sentence to 15 months imprisonment.

== Memorial services ==
In September 2012, a year after the Palmer deaths, a memorial ceremony was held near Jerusalem, attended by U.S. and Canadian diplomats, to add the names of Asher and Yonatan Palmer to a wall commemorating the 300 Americans and Canadians that have been killed in terrorist attacks and Israel's battles. A vineyard was dedicated to Asher and Yonatan on the anniversary of their death and a children's playground in being built in his memory.

== Impact ==
The deaths have been used as examples during definition of security offenses in the policy change of integration laws.

The Palmer incident was used as the basis for building a defense wall in nearby roads. The IDF stated said policies and rules had been changed as a result of the event.

The trial was unusual, because the Office of the Military Advocate does not usually seek murder convictions in stone-throwing incidents, but in this case both the Military advocate charged the rock-thrower, Wa'al al-Arjeh, with murder and the three-judge panel convicted al-Arjeh of intentional murder.

== See also ==
- Murder of Koby Mandell and Yosef Ishran
- Death of Yehuda Shoham
- Murder of Shalhevet Pass
- Death of Khalil al-Mughrabi
- Murders of Neta Sorek and Kristine Luken
