= Faris Odeh =

Palestinian child famed for iconic image (1985–2000)

- فارس عودة
- Photograph of Odeh throwing a stone at an Israeli tank in the Gaza Strip during the Second Intifada, 29 October 2000
- Born: 3 December 1985; Gaza City, Israeli-occupied Gaza Strip
- Died: 8 November 2000 (aged 14); Karni Crossing, Palestine
- Cause of death: Gunshot wound

Faris Odeh (Arabic: فارس عودة; 3 December 1985 – 8 November 2000) was a Palestinian boy from the Israeli-occupied Gaza Strip who became known as a popular symbol for Palestinian resistance because of a photograph where he is seen throwing a stone at an Israeli tank during the Second Intifada. In November 2000, he was killed by Israeli troops near the Karni Crossing while he was throwing stones at them.

A picture of Odeh standing alone in front of a Magach tank, with a stone in his hand and arm bent back to throw it, was taken by a photojournalist from the Associated Press on 29 October 2000. Ten days later, on 8 November, Odeh was again throwing stones at Karni when he was shot in the neck by an Israeli soldier. The boy and the image subsequently assumed iconic status within the Palestinian movement as a symbol of their opposition to the Israeli occupation.

== Early life ==
Odeh was born in the Zeitoun quarter of Gaza City in the Israeli-occupied Gaza Strip, where he lived with his parents Fayek and Anam, as well as his eight brothers and sisters. According to The Washington Post, Odeh was an "adolescent daredevil". He was fond of risky stunts, and once jumped a 2.5-metre (8-foot) gap between the roofs of two four-story buildings.

== Involvement in the Second Intifada ==
When the Al-Aqsa Intifada began in September 2000, Odeh started skipping school to participate in the action, either at the Karni crossing or the Israeli settlement of Netzarim. The headmaster of Odeh's school complained about the boy's absences to his parents who tried, unsuccessfully, to keep him away from the conflict. According to Faris' mother, the boy's father "beat him black and blue for throwing stones." Fayek also tried to physically restrain his son. Once, he locked the boy in his room, but Faris escaped out the window. According to the Post, "The next time Fayek heard that Faris had been at a clash point, he got tougher; he tied the boy's hands and feet together and left him on the roof after dinner. By midnight, his mother, worried sick about the boy, sneaked up to the roof and freed him."

Still, Faris was undeterred. His mother Anam would repeatedly go to the sites of the worst fighting in search of her son, often finding him at the front of the crowd, nearest the Israeli troops. "I must have gone out looking for him 50 times," she was quoted as saying in The Washington Post. "One day, I went out three times. Sometimes I'd sit down to lunch, and before I could put the first bite in my mouth some kids would come by and tell me Faris was at Karni again, throwing stones. And I'd drop my fork and rush out to find him."

"It wasn't the fame he loved," she continued. "In fact, he was afraid that if he was filmed on TV his father would see him, so he'd run away from the cameras. One day, after I'd gone and dragged him away from the clashes every day for a week, I told him: 'Okay, you want to throw stones? Fine. But at least hide behind something! Why do you have to be at the very front, even farther up than the older kids?' And he said, 'I'm not afraid.'"

=== Iconic photograph ===
On 29 October 2000, Associated Press (AP) photographer Laurent Rebours captured the iconic photo of Odeh, who, according to a subsequent AP story, "reveled in his role as the most famous rock-hurler" at Karni. Now a famous photograph, the "powerful image of a boy standing alone facing-off a huge Israeli military tank" has drawn the use of the "David and Goliath" analogy by sociologist Judith Bessant. For many Palestinians, she noted, "he epitomised heroic Palestinian defiance and resistance to Israeli military occupation".

== Aftermath and death ==
Odeh's 17-year-old cousin Shadi, a Palestinian policeman, was killed during a confrontation with Israeli troops on 1 November. "When that happened, Faris said, 'I swear I'll avenge his death,'" Anam Odeh told the Post. "He went to Shadi's funeral wreath and placed a snapshot of himself in it. He said the wreath would be for him, too."

Later, Odeh was reportedly at the front of a group of young Palestinians throwing rocks at Israeli troops at the Karni crossing, when Israeli soldiers opened fire. His friends said that as Odeh crouched to pick up a stone, he was hit in the neck and that, because he was so close to an Israeli tank, that they had to wait nearly an hour before they felt it was safe to remove his body and load it into an ambulance. He was pronounced dead upon arrival at the hospital.

=== Reaction ===
According to United Press International (UPI), tens of thousands of people attended Odeh's funeral. His father told UPI: "He is a martyr, and this is what he always wanted to be, a martyr for the sake of Al Aqsa." Like many Palestinian families who had a member killed by Israeli troops after the outbreak of the Second Intifada, the Odehs received a $10,000 cheque from then-Iraqi president Saddam Hussein. His mother remarked that, "Faris was a boy who loved me so much [...] His blood is worth so much more."

Since his death, Odeh and his image have become iconic, and a symbol of the Second Intifada: "one boy, who dies in a similar confrontation only after the picture is taken, has come to represent [...] thousands of other[s]". Dubbed the "Palestinian everyman" and the "poster boy of Palestinian defiance," for many Palestinians he is a hero, portrayed in graffiti, wall art, calendars and posters. In 2001, his slingshot appeared in an exhibit called "100 Martyrs – 100 Lives" at the Khalil Sakakini Cultural Center in Ramallah, and he was praised by Yasser Arafat in February 2002.

The Faris Odeh activism award has been created in his name, granted annually by Al-Awda: The Palestine Right to Return Coalition (PRCC). The recipient in 2003 was Dr. Salman Abu-Sitta. The photograph, Faris' story and the iconography around it have also subsequently been taken up as a teaching point in human rights and advocacy educational resources.

In the Washington Post interview, his mother said of the image: "When I see his picture my heart is torn to pieces. I guess I feel proud for him being called a hero, standing in front of a tank and all that. But when I see his classmates come around after school, all I can do is cry. [...] I'm so afraid that Faris' death will be for nothing. That everything will just go back to normal. And the only thing that happened is that I'll have lost my son."

==== Wider impact ====
UPI's photo changed Israeli tank doctrine. In August 2001, The Jerusalem Post quoted an anonymous tank doctrinist saying tank personnel were now instructed to fire upon rock-throwers.

Palestinian shabab (youth) were immortalized by the televised footage on them throwing stones at Israeli tanks during the Second Intifada, according to Barbara A. Goldscheider, who cites Faris Odeh and Mohammed Al-Durrah as examples of two Palestinian boys who became instant martyrs.

To French philosopher Pierre-André Taguieff, the Palestinian response to Odeh's death forms part of a popular political religion revolving around the figure of the shahid, or martyr. He views this as a consequence of the "Islamization" of the Palestinian cause, manifested in Palestinian support for a "culture of death." Odeh's mother told reporters that he used to watch Felesteen-Al-Yawm, the Islamic Jihad Movement in Palestine television channel, where the idea of becoming a martyr is highly regarded. "He wanted to join them," she said, "and used to wear their headband."

Dr Eyad al-Sarraj, founder and director of the Gaza Community Mental Health Programme, writes that stone-throwing during the Intifada was one of the few distractions the children had. They did not realize the danger they were in, he said, and felt invincible.

== See also ==
- Muhammad al-Durrah
- Tank Man
- Aed Abu Amro

== Bibliography ==
- Goldscheider, Barbara A. (2005). Al-Naqba (the catastrophe) (Illustrated ed.). Frog Books. ISBN 9781583941270.
- Taguieff, Pierre André (2004). Rising from the Muck: The New Antisemitism in Europe. Chicago: Ivan R. Dee.
