= Murders of Neta Sorek and Kristine Luken =

2010 terrorist attack

Kristine Luken was an American Christian who was murdered in a Palestinian terrorist attack on December 18, 2010, while hiking with her friend Kay Wilson in the hills of Jerusalem. Despite multiple stab wounds, Wilson survived the attack; Luken's body was later found by Israeli police, bound and stabbed to death. The Palestinian terror cell that perpetrated the attack were later arrested. During the investigation, the cell members also confessed to the murder of Neta Sorek, whose stabbed body had been found earlier that year near the Beit Jimal Monastery in the Judean Hills. The Palestinian terrorists were convicted of a series of violent crimes.

== Murder of Neta Sorek ==
Murder of Neta Sorek
- Part of Palestinian Political Violence
- The attack site
- Location: 31°43′30″N 34°58′35″E; Beit Jimal Monastery, Judean Hills, Israel
- Date: 24 February 2010; 16 years ago
- Attack type: Stabbing attack
- Weapon: Knife
- Victim: Neta Sorek (53)
- Assailants: Ibrahim Ghanimat; Kifah Ghanimat

Neta Sorek (Hebrew: נטע שורק) grew up in Israel at Kibbutz Afikim. She later moved to Sweden and then to the United States, but after two decades abroad, she returned to Israel, married and had a daughter. She had worked as an English-language teacher in Zikhron Ya'akov for 13 years and was a member of the feminist group Women for Peace, participating in joint Arab-Jewish projects. Her family said she believed in co-existence; she studied Arabic and met with Arab women from villages in northern Israel. She loved nature and regularly walked outdoors.

On 24 February 2010, members of a Palestinian terrorist cell illegally infiltrated into Israel from Surif, a Palestinian Authority-controlled area, through gaps in the security barrier near Betar Illit. They burgled a house and stole a car from Beit Shemesh and then drove to the Beit Jimal Monastery, waiting for nightfall to make their return to Surif. Sorek was on a vacation in small guest house located near the monastery. Shortly after she reached the site she headed out for a walk around the monastery, where she was murdered. The terrorists spotted Sorek walking alone in the monastery gardens and decided to murder her. They stabbed her to death and fled the vicinity in their stolen car.

Sorek's family were informed several hours later that she had not returned to the place where she was staying. The police were alerted and the Beit Shemesh police station began to investigate her disappearance. Dissatisfied with the police efforts, her family began to search for Neta by themselves. They knew that she had visited the monastery and approximated her whereabouts; eventually, her cousin and two friends discovered her body. Initially the police suspected a suicide but, after an autopsy was conducted, results showed her death was caused as a result of foul play. An investigation was launched to find Neta's murderers.

== Murder of Kristine Luken ==
Murder of Kristine Luken
- Part of Palestinian Political Violence
- The attack site
- Location: 31°43′45″N 35°02′04″E; Mata forest, Beit Shemesh
- Date: 18 December 2010; 15 years ago
- Attack type: Stabbing attack
- Weapon: Knife
- Deaths: Kristine Luken (44)
- Injuries: Kay Wilson (46)
- Assailants: Ayad Fatfata; Kifah Ghanimat

Luken was an American citizen and a member of the Church's Ministry Among Jewish People (CMJ), a Christian group based in the United States and the UK. She was born in Texas and lived for many years in Virginia while working for the US Department of Education before leaving to work for CMJ. She had recently moved to Nottingham, England, where she worked as a ministry staffer. She had first visited Israel in 2007 as part of a Christian pilgrimage to holy sites and she described the tour as furthering her religious understanding and deepening her relationship with God. Luken met Kay Wilson, a British-born Israeli citizen, in August 2010 on a trip to Poland where Wilson was guiding. They visited death camps and Jewish community centers. They became friends and Luken, a keen hiker, and Wilson, a professional Israeli tour guide, decided to go hiking together in Israel during the Christmas holiday.

On Saturday afternoon, 18 December 2010, Luken and Wilson were hiking in the Mata forest, near the town of Beit Shemesh, west of Jerusalem. They noticed two Arab men, Ayad Fatfata and Kifah Ghanimat, approaching them and were suspicious of their intentions. The men attacked them armed with a long serrated knife. The women attempted to fight back, Wilson managing to stab an attacker with a pocketknife, before they were subdued. The men stole their money and removed Wilson's necklace. Wilson recalled: "I didn't understand whether they wanted to rape us or mug us. They removed my Star of David. I tried to convince them we weren't Jewish."

Wilson instructed Luken to feign an epileptic attack and told their assailants that they were part of a tour group that would soon be returning. After half an hour at being held at knifepoint, their shoes were removed and their hands tied behind their backs. After being gagged with parts of a fleece jacket, the two women were separated and forced to kneel on hands and knees. The two women begged for their lives to be spared but were then stabbed multiple times. Wilson later told police: "I realized he was going to behead me. I saw Kristine murdered before my eyes. She was yelling. I didn't want it to hurt me. I tried to keep silent. It was tough, because the beatings were hard, but I tried to play dead."

Wilson was stabbed 13 times and sustained several broken ribs, punctured lungs and diaphragm, a dislocated shoulder, a broken shoulder blade, and a broken sternum; Luken was fatally stabbed in the attack. The attackers returned a few minutes later to confirm that the two women were dead. Wilson was stabbed again in the chest. She said: "I played dead. I saw [the knife] hadn't gone into my heart. My friend was dying, I heard her making gurgling sounds." Wilson regained consciousness and found herself between bushes in the forest. Feeling weak and severely injured, she tried to shift herself to the forest trail so that other people might discover her. She recounted: "I just wanted to sleep and felt as though I were about to collapse, but I knew I could not fall asleep. I tried to get up three times and fell down, I deviated from the path and couldn't find my way, and it was very difficult for me to breathe, but I had to make a switch in my head and think positive."

With her hands still bound behind her back, Wilson staggered barefoot and bleeding heavily from multiple stab wounds for more than 1,200 meters until reaching a parking lot where a family alerted the authorities. She was hospitalized in the Hadassah Ein Kerem Hospital in critical condition. Due to Wilson stabbing one of the attackers with a small penknife, the DNA on her knife led to the capture of a terror cell. She was declared a heroine by the Israeli Shin Bet and the Israeli press.

Police and border officials organized a large hunt for Luken, combing the forests around Beit Shemesh. After an overnight search, Luken's body was found ensconced in bushes, bound and stabbed to death. Police believed her body had been moved there by the assailants.

== Aftermath ==
The role of the Israeli West Bank barrier in preventing terrorist attacks was analyzed and Haaretz concluded that while the West Bank barrier remained unfinished, terrorists continued to have easy access into Israel through the Beit Shemesh corridor from the West Bank.

A memorial service for Kristine Luken was held at the Christ Church in the Old City in Jerusalem, with around 100 people attending. Her family said that "she went boldly where she believe God wanted her to go" and was not deterred by the "questioning and ridicule from others." CMJ director, Robin Aldridge, praised her dedication and said she "radiated goodness that came from the inner core of her being." A memorial service was later held in Nottingham, England. Luken's body was flown back to the United States for burial.

=== Arrests ===
A month after the attack, Israeli police arrested members of the Palestinian terror cell responsible for the murder of Luken and the attempted murder of Wilson. The police relied upon Wilson's testimony, and DNA samples were produced from the blood stains of Ayad Fatfata, who had been lightly stabbed by Wilson in the attack. Ayad Fatfata and Kifah Ghanimat were linked to the scene and confessed to the crime. Police discovered that Kifah Ghanimat was the leader of a Palestinian terror cell of four members, all residents of the Hebron region, that included Ayad Fatfata and Ibrahim Ghanimat.

In addition to admitting to Luken's murder, members of the terror cell confessed to the murder of Neta Sorek from earlier that year and said that they had perpetrated additional stabbing and shooting attacks. The men declared their goal of murdering Jews. The Palestinian cell were indicted for two murders, two attempted murders, a rape and a series of other violent crimes.

=== Trial ===
The Jerusalem District Court convicted Kifah Ghanimat of the murder of Luken and sentenced him to two life sentences and 60 years behind bars. He was convicted under a plea bargain, under which he admitted to the murder of Luken and another attempted murder charge was dropped and two clauses amended. He was also convicted of unlawful entry into Israel, stealing weapons, weapons trading and four counts of attempted murder. Kifah Ghanimat was also convicted of one count of aggravated rape from July 2009. After tying the victim's hands, Kifah had raped her at knifepoint in a cave near the Beit Jamal monastery.

The judges said that Kifah Ghanimat:

was just evil for the sake of being evil, cruel and apathetic to his fellowman, as he stabbed two helpless women to death and slaughtered others with a large knife, and doing such things for months. The cries of the victims echo not only in our imagination but are also heard in the family members' immense suffering.

Ayad Fatafta was convicted of a number of offenses including the murder of Luken and the attempted murder of Wilson.

For the murder of Neta Sorek, Kifah's brother, Ibrahim Ghanimat, received a life sentence and 16 additional years in prison and was also convicted on further charges including car theft and unlawful entry into Israel.

=== Responses ===
Kay Wilson is an international writer and speaker. She speaks for the Israeli advocacy agency Stand With Us and for One Family Together, an Israeli NGO that helps Israeli victims of Palestinian terrorism. She has since grown attached to Orthodox Judaism, saying "It was interesting how I evolved religiously after the attack. I had always seen myself as an Israeli more than a Jew. After the attack, I became convinced I was attacked because I was a Jew, and consequently I began to identify more with Judaism". She has since began to practice the Jewish customs of lighting Shabbat candles and keeping kosher.

Kay Wilson helped found and grow the organization Yellow Brick Road, whose purpose is "to promote the concepts of personal, social and environmental responsibility" via an after-school program in Palestinian refugee camps.

In an interview in 2020, Wilson explained, "By me owning, directing and limiting my rage towards only the guilty and not blaming everyone, I have become friends with many Arabs, Muslims and Palestinians. Ironically, it was people from these communities who reached out to me, thanking me for not blaming them and even asking what they can do to help."

=== U.S. criminal complaint ===
In April 2017, U.S. prosecutors filed a criminal complaint against Fatfata and Ghanimat at the U.S. District Court for the District of Columbia, charging them with murdering a U.S. national outside the United States.

== See also ==
- Murder of Shalhevet Pass
- Murders of Koby Mandell and Yosef Ishran
- Death of Yehuda Shoham
- Itamar massacre
