= Sherri Mandell =

Israeli-American author, mother and activist

Sherri Mandell (Hebrew: שרי מנדל) is an Israeli-American author, mother and activist. She is best known as the mother of Koby Mandell, a thirteen-year-old American boy who was murdered near their home in Tekoa in May 2001. Sherri Mandell and her husband, Rabbi Seth Mandell, founded the Koby Mandell Foundation, and she wrote a book about the murder, The Blessing of a Broken Heart.

== Education and professional history ==
Mandell was born in New York and graduated from Cornell University in 1977. She received an M.A. in creative writing from Colorado State University and taught writing at the University of Maryland and at Penn State University. She is the author of Writers of the Holocaust, and has written for numerous magazines and journals, including The Washington Post, The Denver Post and The Jerusalem Post, and Hadassah Magazine. She and her husband currently write a blog at JPost.com.Heart Earned Wisdom

== Family ==
Sherri and Seth Mandell briefly lived in Israel, where she gave birth to their first child, Yaakov (Koby). In 1996, with her husband and their four children, she returned to Israel where she still lives today. Sherri and Seth, a rabbi and Israel activist, spent several years in Chinuch, Jewish education, prior to moving to Israel. Seth was the executive director of the University of Maryland Hillel in College Park, Maryland, from 1990 to 1996, and prior to that was the director of the Penn State University Hillel. The time they spent as a Hillel family, particularly when they were living in Silver Spring, Maryland, a suburb of Washington, DC, interested them in activism.

== Murder of Koby Mandell ==
On May 8, 2001, Koby and a friend, Yosef Ishran, took off from school to hike in a canyon close to their home in Tekoa. Koby and Yosef were found bludgeoned to death with stones, an act attributed to Palestinian terrorists, although the murderers were never found. Sherri Mandell founded the Koby Mandell Foundation in their son's memory. She is featured as an expert speaker on the documentary Relentless: The Struggle for Peace in Israel.

== The Koby Mandell Foundation ==
The Koby Mandell Foundation, established in 2002, runs healing programs for families that have been directly affected by terror in Israel, having lost an immediate family member to a terrorist attack or an act of war. The Foundation sponsors Camp Koby, its flagship program, for children that have lost a parent or a sibling in an act of terror; Mothers' Healing Retreats for women bereaved by terrorist violence, and similar retreats for widows who have lost a husband to terror or war. Sherri currently directs the Mothers' Healing Retreats.

== Books ==
The Blessing of a Broken Heart (Toby Press, 2003) won the 2004 National Jewish Book Award in the Contemporary Jewish Life category. The book describes Sherri’s loss, her struggle with the first stages of mourning, her journey to find peace, and her growing faith as she endeavors to understand her pain in the context of 3,000 years of Jewish history and tradition. The book was translated into three languages and has also been made into a stage play.

Her next book, The Road to Resilience (Toby Press, 2015) redefines resilience as a process of becoming greater as a result of challenges.

She is also the author of two picture books, “The Upside Down Boy and the Israeli Prime Minister” and 'The Elephant in the Sukkah.” Her latest memoir is about pastoral counseling and is called “Reaching for Comfort.”
