= Killing of Yehuda Shoham =

2001 infant murder during the Second Intifada

- Part of the Second Intifada
- Location of Eli within the West Bank
- Location: Eli, West Bank
- Date: 5 June 2001; 25 years ago
- Attack type: Stoning attack
- Weapon: Large rock
- Deaths: Yehuda Shoham
- Perpetrator: Unknown

The killing of Yehuda Shoham occurred on 5 June 2001 as the result of a stoning attack attributed to Palestinians on a civilian vehicle, from the Israeli settlement of Shilo, in which five-month-old American-Israeli Yehuda Shoham was seated. Rocks crashed through the car's windscreen and crushed the infant's skull. Shoham died of severe brain damage on 11 June 2001.

This stoning attack and the infant's death, six days later, made headlines in Israel. Both incidents were part of a Second Intifada that started in September 2000 and by 12 June 2001 had claimed the lives of 489 Palestinians and 109 Israelis.

== Background ==
The Second Intifada, which began 8 months earlier, marked a period of intensified Palestinian-Israeli violence. On 22 May, Sharon declared a unilateral ceasefire and refrained from retaliating against Palestinian attacks. On Friday, 1 June, a suicide bombing outside a Tel Aviv disco occurred which killed 21 people, mainly Israeli teenagers who had immigrated from Russia. The day after, Saturday, 2 June, Yasser Arafat's call for a cease-fire staved off Israeli retaliation.

== Attack ==
The incident occurred as Benny and Batsheva Shoham and their only child Yehuda approached Eli after paying a shiva call in Ra'anana.

Near Eli, Palestinians hiding at the roadside hurled rocks at the car which broke through the car's windscreen and crushed the infant's skull. The father continued driving, worried about an ambush, and at a nearby intersection, the couple noticed their baby's head injuries. Batsheva performed mouth-to-mouth resuscitation on Yehuda until the arrival of paramedics.

Yehuda was taken to an intensive care unit at the Hadassah Hospital in Jerusalem, where he lay unconscious and with severe head injuries. He was attached to a respirator for nearly a week before dying of severe brain damage on 11 July.

During his time in the hospital, Yehuda's parents gave him a second name, "Chaim," which means life, hoping that he would live. While in the hospital, Yehuda was visited by then Israeli Prime Minister Ariel Sharon.

== Aftermath ==
In the meantime, Israel took a variety of measures to reduce tension, with Defense Minister Binyamin Ben-Eliezer citing a "significant reduction in the number of attacks". Though Palestinians would be subject to strict closure confining them to their towns, Israel eased some travel restrictions and Palestinians were to be allowed to return from Jordan and Egypt, raw materials would be permitted to enter and exit the Palestinian territories, and Palestinians would be allowed to return to their jobs in an industrial zone near the Erez crossing point. Palestinian security commanders traveled to trouble spots in the Gaza Strip to consult with local officers over the cease-fire enforcement.

When news of Yehuda's wounding spread on Tuesday, 5 June, far-right settlers urged Ariel Sharon to retaliate. The incident angered Israel's 200,000 settlers who urged Ariel Sharon to end Israel's "policy of restraint", and abandon the ceasefire. The Independent suggested that the incident would be cited by many Israelis as reason for stepping up military measures. The morning after Yehuda's wounding, at least 300 settlers, arriving in buses, assailed two villages adjacent to Shiloh, Assawiya, and Luban al-Sharkiya, which lay under curfew and within Israel's security responsibility, and, according to B'tselem, in the presence of, and according to local testimony, with the assistance of the IDF, fired a wheat harvest, a hothouse, a carpentry shop and a school, stole tools and shot a Palestinian youth in the stomach or the leg.

There were rock-throwing battles between settlers and Palestinians at the site of the attack on the Shohams' car during which one Israeli and seven Palestinians were injured. In addition, settlers in Hebron also attacked local Palestinian shopkeepers. The settlers had been a focal target of Palestinian militancy during an eight-month uprising. Two settlers were arrested by Israeli police as a result of the riots.

Though reluctant to become involved in the conflict, the U.S. dispatched C.I.A. director George Tenet, who was scheduled to meet separately with the Israeli and Palestinian sides on Thursday, 7 June, in order to re-establish co-operation on security issues between the two parties, which had broken down after the IDF had shot at the car of the Gaza Strip security chief Mohammad Dahlan in mid-April, and had fired on the home of their West Bank security chief Jibril Rajoub in late May.

Tenet's visit backed up an effort by the European Union to seize on Arafat's declaration in order to transform the ceasefire into a genuine halt to the reciprocal blood-letting. On Wednesday, 6 June, the eve of Tenet's scheduled visit, the IDF announced it would award medals to the commanders and troops serving at Netzarim Junction, where the child, Mohammed al-Dura had been shot dead. The news was seen as a blow to the restoration of trust. Thousands of demonstrators protested in Jerusalem against what they termed Sharon's "restraint policy". That same evening, Palestinians were outraged when Sharon called Arafat a "murderer" and "pathological liar" in an interview addressing the Russian community that had been angered at his failure to retaliate for the disco bombing. The broadcast was carried on Israeli television. Though given the red-carpet treatment abroad, he added, Arafat did not act like a head of state but rather like the chief of terrorists and murderers.

On Thursday, 7 June, speaking to reporters at a rally urging Ariel Sharon to retaliate for the attack on Yehuda and other recent attacks, Yehuda's father said "Unfortunately, our government is showing a lot of weakness in its response to terrorism". He also declared:

This is our land, these are our roads, and if we are afraid of driving to Tel Aviv [Tel Aviv] and Netanya [Netanya] also.

== Negotiations, funeral and reactions ==
Tenet's meeting with both sides was postponed until Sunday, 10 June, after the Americans realized the extent of their differences. Matters were buffeted by the killing of three Bedouin women, struck by Israeli tank shells while in their tents in the Gaza Strip over the weekend, and the critical injuries sustained by an Islamic Jihad member in a car-bombing, which the group suspected as being the work of Israel. He proposed that Israel desist from attacking Palestinian targets and withdraw to the positions they held on 28 September 2000. He asked Palestinians to thwart attacks on Israeli positions, to end what Israelis view as incitement in the media, and to proceed to arrest militant gunmen.

On Monday, 11 June, the day Yehuda died, Israeli Foreign Minister Shimon Peres met the Palestinian minister for international co-operation, Nabil Shaath in Luxembourg to explore a compromise. Tenet eventually presided over a tense 4-hour meeting the following day, which was broken off after the gaps failed to be bridged. The Israelis insisted on the arrest of people they suspected of terrorism before they would allow a cooling-off period, while the Palestinians demanded that security arrangements be followed by an Israeli pledge to freeze to all construction in settlements in the occupied territories. The Palestinians refused to conduct what they called arbitrary arrests. The chief of staff of the Israeli army, General Shaul Mofaz, called the truce itself an optical illusion.

The funeral procession for Yehuda began with settlers gathering in front of Ariel Sharon's office in Jerusalem with the child's body carried before them. As Sharon stepped up to a podium to address them, settlers shouted "Vengeance!" and "Go to war". Prime Minister Sharon spoke to the funeral procession outside his office, and, acknowledging the settlers' impatience with a ceasefire, said:

If we stand firm and grit our teeth, and carry on even when the tears are choking us, we will win... I am not here to make a speech, but to weep, to weep together with you. May the memory of Yehuda be blessed.

Sharon also asked for prayers for the infant, and accused the Palestinian Authority of inciting violence. From there the procession walked to the northern West Bank settlement of Shilo where Yehuda was buried. One of Yehuda's cousins said, "Yehuda was just a baby, without sin or enemy, yet he was killed for one reason only, he was a Jew on his way home in Eretz Yisrael [Eretz Yisrael]." In a letter to the United Nations, Permanent Representative of Israel to the United Nations Yehuda Lancry outlined Israel's position, which affirmed that the death of Yehuda Shoham constituted a "reprehensible act of terrorism" that took place just over two weeks after Israel had declared that it would refrain from initiating military action against Palestinians, and barely a week after Yassir Arafat had undertaken to fight violence and terrorism.

In Yehuda's memory, his parents decided to collect donations for dormitories at the yeshiva in Shiloh. His parents also established the Yehuda Fund in January 2002 "in their son's memory."

== See also ==
- Murder of Helena Rapp
- Murder of Shalhevet Pass
- Murder of Tali Hatuel and her four daughters
- Murder of Ofir Rahum
- Death of Asher and Yonatan Palmer
- Children in the Israeli-Palestinian conflict
