= Palestinian stone throwing =

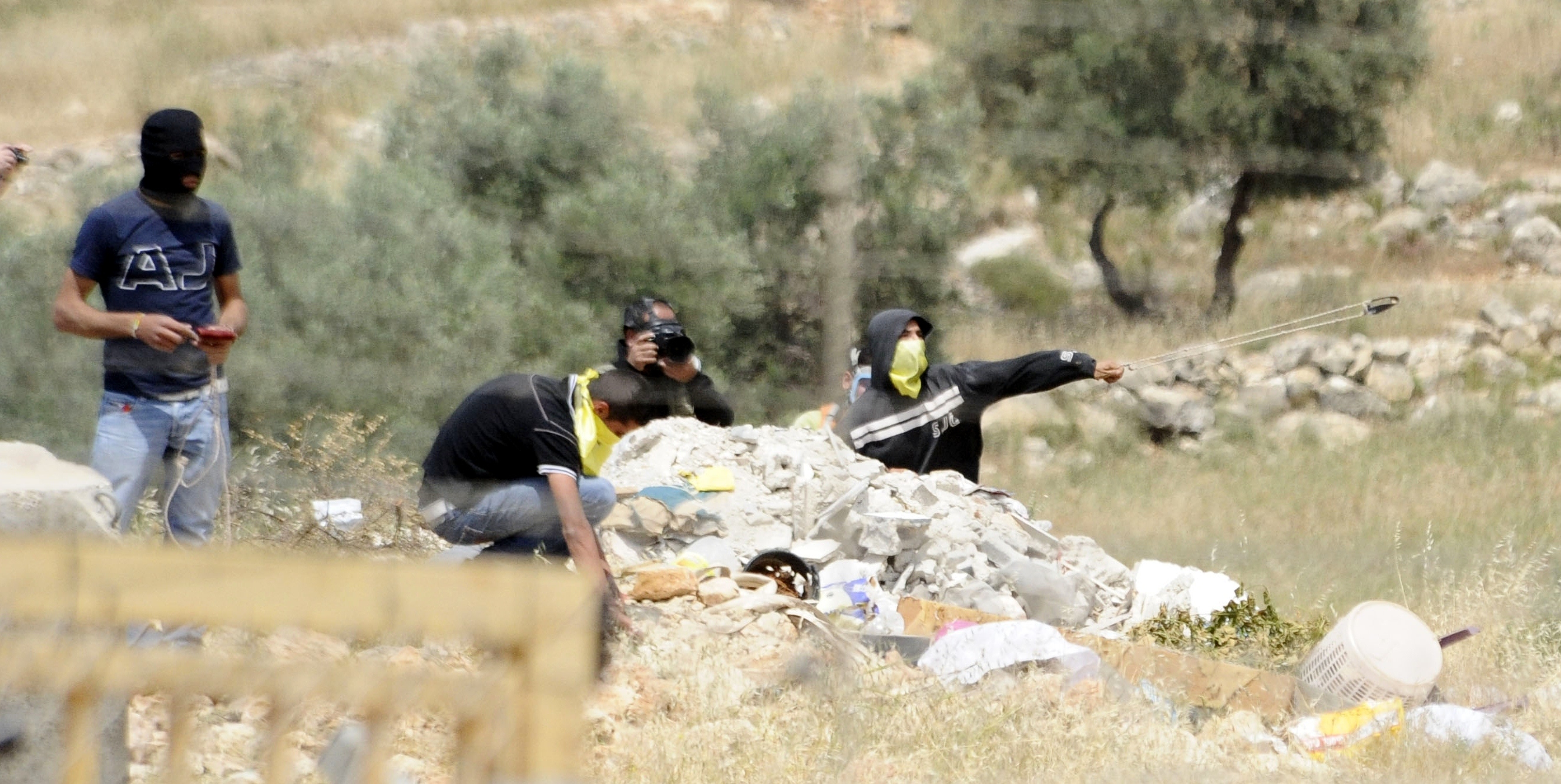
Palestinian stone-throwers in Bil'in

Palestinians have thrown stones as a tactic with both a symbolic and military dimension when used against heavily armed troops.

It has also been described variously as a form of traditional, popular protest guerrilla tactic or action, or a tactic of civil disobedience which came to prominence during the First Intifada. At least 14 Israelis have been killed by Palestinian stone throwing. Israeli soldiers responded to stone-throwing children with live gunfire, killing 215 children in the First Intifada. Stone-throwing has occasionally been imitated by activists among the Arab citizens of Israel. In many occasions IDF uses Palestinian civilians as human shields, including children, against Palestinian protesters throwing rocks.

Proponents, sympathizers, as well as some analysts have characterized stone throwing by Palestinians as a form of "limited", "restrained", "non-lethal" violence. Such stone throwing can at times prove lethal: over a dozen Israelis, including women, children, and infants, have died as a result of stones being thrown at cars. Some Palestinians appear to regard it as symbolic and non-violent, given the disparity in power and equipment between the Israeli forces and the Palestinian stone-throwers. The state of Israel has passed laws to sentence throwers convicted of the charge to up to 10 years imprisonment even without proof of intent to harm. In some cases, Israelis have argued that it should be treated as a form of terrorism, or that, in terms of the psychology of those who hurl stones, even in defense or in protest, it is intrinsically aggressive.

Stone throwing is not considered a deadly force in most countries: in the West firearms are generally not used in crowd or riot dispersals and proportionality of force is the norm, except where immediate danger to life exists. Stone-throwers also employ catapults, slings and slingshots armed with readily available materials at hand: stones, bricks, bottles, pebbles or ball bearings, and sometimes rats or cement blocks. Slingshots are often loaded with large ball bearings instead of stones. Since the 1987 uprising, the technique is favoured as one which, to foreign eyes, will invert the association of modern Israel with David, and her enemies with Goliath, by casting the Palestinians as David to Israel's Goliath. Despite there having been frequent acts of protest all over the Palestinian territories, the number of shooting incidents has been less than 3%. Nonetheless, the international press and media focused on the aspect of Palestinian stone throwing, which garnered more headline attention than other violent conflicts in the world, so that it became iconic for characterizing the uprising. According to Edward Said, a total cultural and social form of anti-colonial resistance by the Palestinian people is commodified for outside consumption simply as delinquent stone throwing or mindless terroristic bombings.

Israeli law treats stone throwing as a felony, with a maximum penalty of up to 20 years, depending on the circumstances and intentions: a maximum of 10 years for stoning cars, regardless of intent to endanger passengers, and 20 years for throwing stones at people, without proof of intent to cause bodily harm. A three-year temporary measure was enacted in November 2015, mandating minimum sentences and creating a legal equivalence between rocks and other weapons. Israeli undercover forces have been observed infiltrating protests on numerous occasions, inciting demonstrators and themselves throwing stones at Israeli troops. According to Israel's statistics, no IDF soldier has died as a result of Palestinian stone throwing, only civilians (but see Binyamin Meisner, killed by a dropped concrete block).

== History ==
=== Cultural context and historical precedents ===
The practice of stone throwing has deep religious, cultural and historical resonance, and is grounded in the age-old use of slinging stones among young rural herders whose task it was both to keep watch on livestock, and ward off predators of family flocks, and to hunt birds. A Palestinian legend has it that after the creation God sent the angel Gabriel to distribute rocks all over the world, but he tripped on entering Palestine and spilled most of his load over that country. Children learn to use the same kind of sling employed by David to kill Goliath, and stone throwing has been, according to Jonathan Cook, an 'enduring symbol' of how the weak can challenge the strong. From the verse of Ecclesiasticus, 'a time to gather stones and a time to scatter', stones themselves evoke different traditions, from Jewish mourning and the rite of tashlikh to strictly Orthodox Jewish stone throwing to protest violations of the Sabbath or Palestinians in protests or to defend the Haram-al-Sharif. In Jerusalem, whose first king, David, slew Goliath with a single stone, and where the practice of stoning prophets, or those condemned to death, was frequent, religious dissensions in the city repeatedly exploded into vicious stone throwing matches. It was a shared Muslim and Jewish tradition in Palestine, noted by travelers, to hurl stones at the Tomb of Absalom for rebelling against David. Meron Benvenisti likened the very way Jewish, Christian and Muslim communities use their traditions to stone throwing:

'The chronicles of Jerusalem are a gigantic quarry from which each side has mined stones for the construction of its myths-and for throwing at each other.'

Gaza, where the First Intifada broke out, has had a long history of stone throwing, which, according to Oliver and Steinberg, goes back at least to an incident where Alexander the Great, while laying siege to the city, was hit by a stone, and almost lost his life. The medieval Christian pilgrim Fabri wrote that 1483 pilgrims took care to arrive in Gaza at dusk to avoid being stoned by "the little Muslim boys". According to historian Benny Morris the practice of throwing stones at Jews is a venerable one in the Middle East, symbolic of Jewish degradation under Muslim rule. Morris quotes a 19th-century traveler: "I have seen a little fellow of six years old, with a troop of fat toddlers of only three and four, teaching [them] to throw stones at a Jew." William Shaler, American Consul to Arab Algiers from 1815 to 1828, reported that the practice of Muslims throwing rocks at Jews was commonly seen. The practice of Arab rioters throwing stones at Jews was seen in the 1948 Anti-Jewish Riots in Tripolitania, Libya. It has been used as a weapon against colonialism in other Arab countries.

To modern Palestinians in Gaza, their practice is likened to ancient precedents in Islamic history. Their media draw an analogy between their situation and that of the people in Mecca, when the Christian Ethiopian king of Yemen, Abraha al-Ashram, launched an attack on the city and the Kaa'ba in 571 C.E. the year of Muhammad's birth. The Quran Al-Fil sura recounts that elephants were deployed in the assault, and birds loaded with stones repulsed the attack. Numerous Palestinian poems and popular songs celebrate the heroism of children who throw stones, and in some of them the imagery of this episode in the Quran is deployed so that America is compared to the elephant herd, while Palestinians are assimilated to the stone throwing birds.

According to one hadith or saying ascribed to Muhammad by Abdullah b. Mughaffal al-Muzani, the prophet of Islam proscribed stone throwing, saying: "It neither stops a game nor inflicts injury on an enemy, but rather puts out the eye and breaks the teeth." Many Palestinians take the tradition as harking back more directly to the Peasant Revolt that broke out in the wake of the Egyptian–Ottoman War (1831–33) when Ibrahim Pasha invaded Palestine and imposed harsh taxation and conscription policies on the local fellahin.

=== Mandatory Palestine ===
Stone throwing played an important, if secondary role, after firearms, in the 1936–39 Arab revolt in Palestine against the British Mandatory authorities. In October 1936 a Collective Punishment Ordinance was invoked to impose punitive measures on villages implicated in stone throwing against passing vehicles. The Nablus District Commissioner Hugh Foot posted a notice warning that not only boy stone-throwers but also their fathers and guardians would be punished.

In October 1933, Palestinian Arabs went on strike and staged several demonstrations in Nablus, Haifa and Jaffa in opposition to Jewish immigration. The Palestine Police Force (PPF) opened fire on a protesting Arab crowd which threw stones at a Barclays bank in Nablus, wounding several. Four Arab protestors who were among a stone-throwing crowd swarming a PPF police station were killed by policemen on the same day; similar incidents also occurred in Jaffa. The incidents ultimately resulted in 26 Arabs and one policeman being killed and a further 187 wounded as the strikes were suppressed by the PPF. In Gaza, one British railway official was killed in 1937 when he left his car to observe Arab stone-throwers. Another Briton escaped four such attacks by showing he was not circumcised. The practice was not limited to Gaza. A PPF police officer reflecting on the period of the thawra, remarked: "Arabs for some reason can throw a stone more accurately than anyone else in the world. They rarely miss."

Jews also used this tactic: when it was reported in Palestine that the British Foreign Minister Ernest Bevin declared that Britain had never undertaken to establish a Jewish state but rather a Jewish home, the news was received with outrage, and led to Jewish riots in Tel Aviv. On 14 November 1945, the megaphones blared 'Disperse or we fire' towards a milling crowd of Jewish stone-throwers. Care was taken to shoot over their heads, and they dispersed without injury, relocating to another suburb to continue the riot.

=== 1967–1987 ===
After the Six-Day War left Israel in belligerent occupation of the West Bank and Gaza, stone throwing occasionally emerged as a form of social protest. The first death was the Esther Ohana in 1983. In clashes with Israeli forces, students would be detained for beatings, subject to a brief trial on charges of stone throwing, and fined before they were released. Protests among Israel's Palestinians at times also quickly turned into stone-throwing demonstrations at towns like Nazareth. When Mubarak Awad, a Gandhian pacifist, set up workshops, as part of his Palestinian Centre for the Study of Nonviolence to teach non-violent forms of resistance in the early 1980s, many Palestinians reacted negatively to his criticism of the traditional practice. Though advocating that Palestinians throw flowers not stones, to protest the occupation, he was deported for putatively fomenting civil disobedience in the early months of the First Intifada. In this period, Palestinian university students played a major role in the organization of stone throwing and other disturbances.

=== First Intifada ===
In an anthropological overview of the First Intifada, Scott Atran traced conflict responses between Palestinians and Zionists back to the Palestinian Revolt, 1936–1939 where a policy of "armed struggle" emerged against a generally defensive Zionist approach of "restraint". By contrast the first Intifada was, in his view, characterized by an opposition between a Palestinian emphasis on preaching restraint, if not invariably nonviolence and an explicit Israeli policy of using "the iron fist", which, in the latter instance, marked to first time since Israel's independence that the former consensus of 'the utility and morality' of recourse to violence was broken.

Rock-throwing and mass demonstrations had played no part in Fatah's previous guerrilla activities, and the uprising came as a complete surprise to the PLO. This specific tactic was addressed by Military Order No. 1108 which ratcheted up the penalty for such an offence from one and a half years to 20 years imprisonment. Bail for young children arrested for throwing stones was $400–500 (1988) and if the offense was repeated, the money was forfeited and the child could be placed in administrative detention for a year. The parents of children under 12 years of age could be imprisoned as punishment for their child's offense. Writing graffiti, an act vigorously censored by the military authorities, was also an important instrument for contesting the occupation. stone throwing, which had been intermittent and confined locally, broke out on a large systematic organized and spontaneous grassroots scale and took root with the First Intifada in December 1987 after two decades of Israeli rule, becoming the major symbol of the intifada itself. Those who participated, among the best-educated in the Middle East, took to brandishing their banned national flag and throwing rocks and molotov-bombs at IDF forces, to express their frustrations at limited opportunities after decades of growing up under Israeli occupation. It has been called 'the first stone-throwing rebellion against Israel.' Shame and guilt for not doing enough to help their parents or free their land also played a motivational role. Palestinians had access to some arms; they shot collaborators within their ranks – but decided to abstain from organized violence, except for stone throwing. Palestinians at the time, it is argued, were certain that Israel would not respond with gunfire if they limited their revolt to stone throwing. The choice of stones caused a rift in the Human Rights world, with some human rights theorists justifying it as largely symbolic, others, like Mubarak Awad, more critical. One Israeli general dismissed the idea that stone throwing was terrorism; it was typical of a national movement. Others noted at the time that the practice had not incurred any fatalities among Israelis, despite several millions stones being hurled. What the practice did, it was theorized, was to set up the rebellion in terms of the David versus Goliath scenario.

The guerrilla tactics were partially inspired by the feats of the Afghan insurgency against the Soviet Union and by various colonial uprisings such as the Algerian war of independence against France (1954–1962), but also relied on a perception that Israelis would not, like Jordanian, Syrian and Algerian armies, send in tanks to demolish entire villages.

Resisting temptations to resort to small-arms warfare in the face of the vast military resources of the Israeli armed forces, Palestinians took to throwing stones, an improvised weapon which had deep symbolic resonances of a cultural, historical and religious kind. As a popular song at the time put it, the stone became their Kalashnikov.

Throwers ranged from small children to adolescent youths. Those who were killed by Israeli fire are called martyrs.

Participation required little organization, and had an element of spontaneity. Dina Matar, then 14, from the refugee camp of Dheisheh, recalls that one was told to watch the street, and then join in stone throwing. At the same time, leaflets did circulate asserting that every child 'must carry the stone and throw it at the occupier'. School children in the Jenin Refugee Camp created a game where Jews used guns and Palestinians threw stones, with the latter always winning.

It was in large part sustained by youths motivated by a moral sense of urgency to replace the Occupation with some form of a Palestinian national entity. To throw a stone was to throw a 'piece of the land' of Palestine at the occupiers. The stones of the land so crucial to the Israeli sense of history were gathered into caches to become the weapons of resistance. There was also, according to Muḥammad Haykal, an unconscious analogy with the ritual stoning that pilgrims on the Hajj perform at Mina, in which the devil is stoned symbolically 49 times. In Palestinian dialect the words for sling (al-maqlā') and slingshot (al-muqlay'ah) derive from the same Semitic root, ql', which signifies 'ousting, expelling, casting out'. Though Palestinian Christians tended to be somewhat less prone to stone throwing during the intifada, preferring other forms of protest like resistance to paying taxes to Israel, the Catholic priest, Fr. Manuel Musallam, hailed the stone-throwers as nation builders, the "granite youth" of Palestine. Dr. Geries S. Khoury in his theological work Intifidat al-Sama'a Intifidat al-Ard, (1990), while arguing for a non-violent challenge to the occupation, likened the uprising to Christ's search for social fairness, and praised stone throwing by children as an extension of Jesus's struggle for justice.

The conflict was known as "the war of the stones" and Palestinians still call children who grew up during the first intifada "children of the stones" When a tax was imposed on all Palestinian vehicles in Gaza and the West Bank, while exempting cars driven by settlers, Palestinians dubbed it 'the stone tax', believing that it was a punitive measure to retaliate against the widespread stoning of Israeli cars in the Palestinian territories.

=== Second Intifada ===
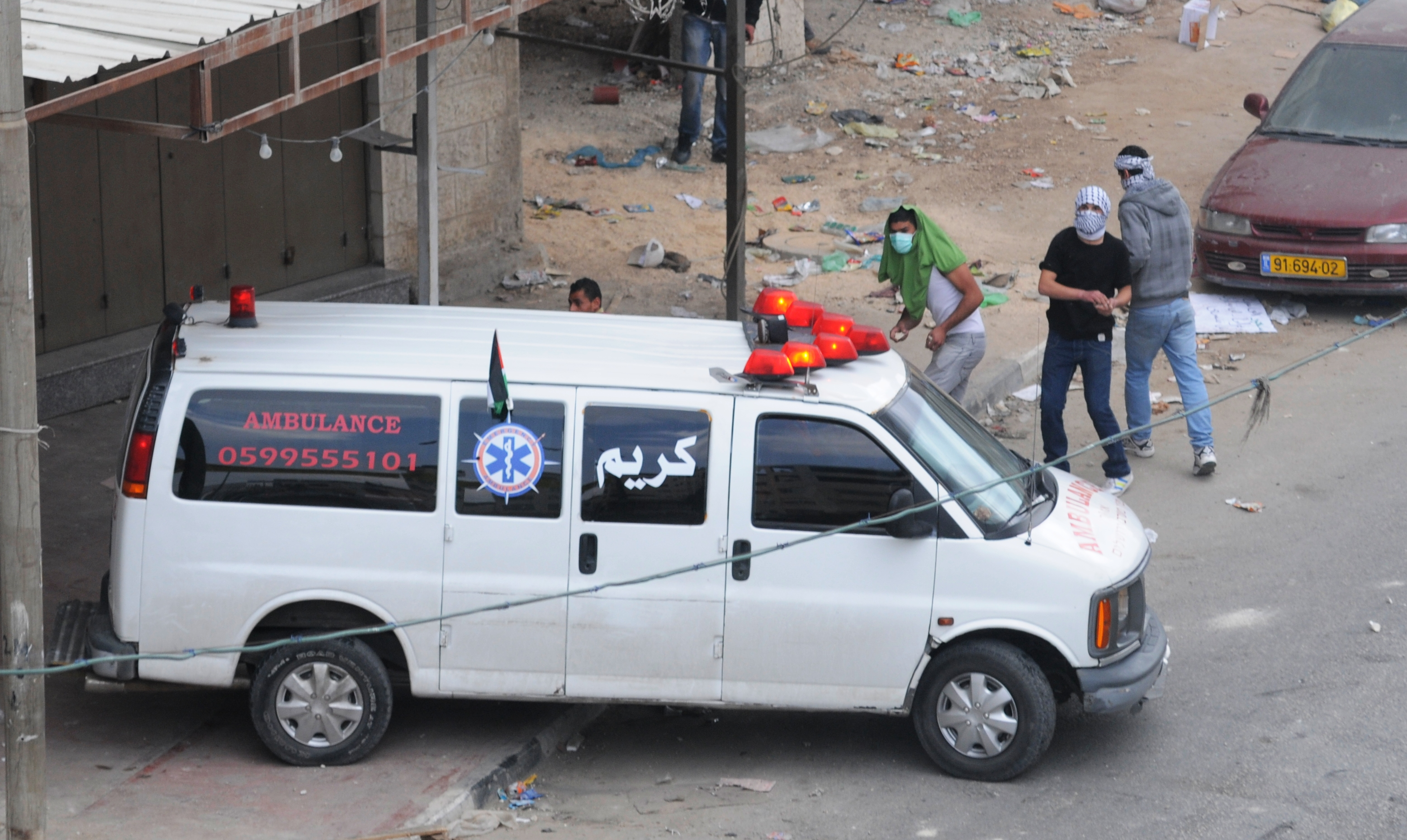
Palestinians throwing stones from behind an ambulance during a riot in Qalandiya.

In the Second Intifada, the generally non-violent methods of the earlier uprising gave way to more brutal methods against both IDF troops and Israeli citizens: stone throwing as the hallmark of resistance yielded place to Suicide bombings, overwhelmingly conducted by Hamas and Islamic Jihad. The intifada broke out with rock throwing to protest Ariel Sharon's visit to the Haram al-Sharif on 28 September 2000, which led to a clash in which 6 Palestinians were killed, and 220 wounded by Israeli gunfire, while 70 Israeli police were injured by stoning. The incident rapidly escalated into the Second Intifada when, as rock-and Molotov-cocktail-throwing continued over the next two days, 24 Palestinians were shot dead, and an Israeli soldier was killed. At the outset, participating teenagers resumed the traditional stone throwing to deny vehicles access to settlements. Israel's response was, according to Lev Luis Grinberg, to use all the weapons in its arsenal, including snipers, and shooting missiles from Apache helicopters at demonstrators and buildings. He concludes 'It responded with disproportionate force that only an army can unleash totally out of place against stone-throwing civilians. Human Rights Watch documented early that IDF soldiers were shooting stone throwing youths where no serious threats to their safety existed.

According to IDF statistics, in the first 3 months 73% of incidents, some 3,734 attacks by Palestinians, did not involve the use of arms. 82 of the 272 Palestinians shot dead in these clashes with the IDF (a further 6 were killed by settlers) were minors. Of the 10,603 Palestinians wounded over the same time, 20% by live ammunition and roughly 40% by rubber-bullets, 36% were minors.

One of the iconic images of the Second Intifada was of a little boy, Faris Odeh, in Gaza confronting an Israeli tank and winding his arm up to throw a stone from his sling. Snipers were used to put down stone-throwers within Israel at Umm al-Fahm inside Israel during the Second Intifada. When news of the killings reached Nazareth on Yom Kippur, a strike was declared, which was, according to one local report, met by hundreds of Israelis from Nazareth Illit who began to stone Palestinian houses. Police were called and hundreds of Palestinian Israelis were arrested, while the youths from Nazareth Illit were reportedly left alone.

Just one Palestinian minor, out of a total of 853 charged with stone throwing between 2005 and 2010, was acquitted. After pressure was exerted by international legal organizations, Israel finally instituted an Israeli Juvenile Military Court in the West Bank in November 2009. The rate of conviction for juvenile stone-throwers is close to 100%, and upwards of 70% of them suffer some form of violence when detained.

== Israeli tactics against the first wave of stone throwing ==
During the First Intifada, Israeli soldiers often responded to stone-throwing children with physical beatings, tear gas, and live gunfire. As the intifada went on, the rate of Israeli soldiers injuring children by gunfire increased, but the number of children killed by Israeli gunfire decreased, indicating a policy of Yitzhak Rabin to use gunfire to injure and disable children, but not kill them. A total of 215 children were fatally shot, though most were not involved in confronting the soldiers, and 5,315 children were injured by Israeli gunfire during this period.

A minority (15%) of these demonstrations turned violent. Israeli public perceptions overwhelmingly viewed these protests as predominantly violent, aimed not only at soldiers but civilians, and at the existence of the state of Israel. The mass civil unrest, called by the Israelis, hafarot seder ( disruptions of order) found IDF soldiers and staff unprepared. Soldiers, particular Druze border guards, initially used extreme and indiscriminate violence to shoot, bash and interrogate throwers of stones and Molotov cocktails, to the point that sickened some fellow soldiers. Israel's standard strategy for responding to Palestinian stone throwing protest had been to fire live ammunition at a relatively long distance from the site of the disturbance, and shoot canisters of tear gas into crowds. Untrained for riot control on this scale, Israeli troops fired rubber-bullets, then live ammunition, at the lower extremities or into crowds, so that, within a month of the outbreak (28 December 1987) 28 Palestinians had been killed and 180 injured by such methods, as opposed to 60 Israeli soldiers and 40 civilians. In September 1988 the Prime Minister Yitzhak Shamir proposed reclassifying rocks as lethal weapons to enable both settlers and soldiers to shoot immediately, without prior warning.

The then deputy head of the IDF, Ehud Barak, disavowing any desire to fire at children stated at the time that, 'when you see a child, you don't shoot'. A new military device which hurled out pebbles at high speed was also deployed. IDF forces were permitted to respond to stone throwing with lethal fire even when it posed no risk to their lives. From the outset, in Gaza, tire-burning and stone throwing was answered with fire from M16 assault rifles. Those caught were given exemplary punishments: 4 teenagers in Gaza alone were given prison sentences of 10–14 years for throwing stones and Molotov cocktails, compared to 13 years for Sheikh Yassin, the leader of Hamas at the time, for having creating clandestine weapon caches in Gaza back in 1983. Where earlier, disturbances by schoolchildren such as raising the Palestinian flag, had been negotiated by the IDF, harsh measures under the new policy led to immediate quelling by military force. 'Consequently,' it has been argued, 'the traditional view, which had so helped Israel maintain its self-image as a righteous nation that used force only in self-defense, against much greater and virulent Arab aggression, had dissolved in a matter of weeks.'

Tactics eventually changed, as large crowds were replaced by small groups of 10-20 youths who would stand round watching soldiers, making them nervous. Quick attacks became the rule, though incidents of children being gunned down for simply insulting troops are known . Faced with persistent stone throwing, commanders were instructed to identify and shoot those whom they regarded as the chief instigators, masked youths.

By late December 1989, 85% of the incidents of violence consisted in stone throwing, 10% in tire-burning, 5% firebombings and stabbings. Given the high number of Palestinian deaths, an order of January 1988, ultimately thought to derive from Yitzhak Rabin, was executed for a large-scale military incursion into the Territories in order to implement a policy of "force, might, and beatings", in order to "avoid a bloodbath", since "nobody dies of a beating" Specifically soldiers were authorized to "break bones", arms and legs, as retaliation for stoning. Countless instances of beating stone throwers ensued, Within five days of the new directive's promulgation, Gaza's Al-Shifa Hospital had to treat 200 cases of broken elbows and knees and fractured skulls, and hands were smashed to deny youths the ability to throw stones. Between 19 and 21 January 1988, 12 demonstrators of Beita alone were rounded up without resistance, assembled and had their bones broken. and videos of soldiers breaking the bones were flashed round the world, one showing soldiers smashing a pinned-down stone-thrower's femur with a rock: some are still available on YouTube.

In March 1988, since it was found that wooden cudgels were prone to shatter in beating Palestinians, plastic and fibre-glass truncheons were soon introduced. Within two years, the Swedish Branch of the Save the Children Fund estimated that some 23,600 to 29,000 children required medical assistance after being beaten by Israeli forces in the first two years of the Intifada, while in the same period, Palestinian attacks resulted in the death of five Israeli children. In August 1988 plastic bullets were introduced which retained effectiveness at 100 metres, out of range of stone-throwers, and were potentially lethal at 70 yards. Over 5 months, these munitions still killed 47 Palestinians, and injured a further 288 in riot dispersal clashes. By the autumn of 1988 the de facto rule permitted the use of lived ammunition against children caught stone throwing or seen fleeing from a scene where such behavior had occurred, even if there was no impending risk to soldiers' lives.

The practice flowed over into Israel when the country's Arab minority adopted the method. Some 133 incidents involving stone throwing were registered there in 1988. Regulations in early 1988 stipulated force could be used in quelling riots or overcoming resistance to arrest. These envisaged lethal response when one's life was endangered, and the use of weapons within a context of direct conflict. Human Rights Watch, in a review of soldiers dispersing incidents of stone throwing, noted that soldiers, whose lives were not endangered, still frequently shot Palestinians who were neither armed or "wanted", often when fleeing clashes. In 1991 an Israeli journalist, Doron Meiri, discovered that a police interrogation unit had been operative for some time whose function was to torture suspected stone-throwers and to extract confessions by using electric shock treatment. It had an extraordinary high level of success. Policies of deportation and home demolitions were also instituted, the latter of which extended to, according to B'Tselem, razing the homes of youngsters accused of stone throwing, These measures only stiffened the resistance of the stone-throwers.

At the end of the 6 year uprising, 120,000 Palestinians had been arrested, from 1,162 to 1,409 killed, and of the 23–29,000 children beaten, a third were under 10 years of age, as opposed to 172 Israelis, some killed in terror attacks waged by militants outside the control of the Intifada's UNLU. It has been calculated that 90% of the 271 Palestinian minors shot dead on the basis of the army criteria for the use of live fire were killed at moments when they were not actually throwing stones. In clinical follow-up studies of the intifada children hurt in these clashes, 18-20% of the sample should a high incidence of psychopathological symptoms, while in Gaza 41% of children evinced symptoms of posttraumatic stress disorder, and a Palestinian mother explained the effect of the traumatic experiences:

These children are the intifada and they have been hurt deeply . . If there is no solution, these children will one day throw more than stones because their hatred is great and they have nothing to hope for. If hope isn't given to them, they will take it from others. . . We fear they will take the knives from our kitchens to use as weapons.'

During the first Intifada, large rocks and cinderblocks were often dropped from above in Gaza on Israeli soldiers patrolling the city's alleys. In Nablus on 24 February 1989, Israeli Paratrooper Binyamin Meisner was killed by a cement block dropped from the top of a building during clashes between Israeli troops and local residents in the town market. In May 2018, Duvdevan Unit soldier Ronen Lubarsky was killed inside the al-Am'ari Refugee Camp near Ramallah, during an operational raid to capture people suspected of engaging in recent attacks, after a marble slab hit his head after being hurled from a rooftop.

== David and Goliath symbolism ==
The First Intifada's mode of confrontation between armed soldiers and stone throwing youths was as much a 'battle of perceptions' as a military clash. The myth of David and Goliath in which ancestral Israel's first king defeats the Philistines by the use of a slingshot and stones had been reenacted in the Zionist struggle to establish a state against a much larger Arab world's opposition, a "few against the many" narrative, of a David slaying Goliath, which some argue still exercises a hegemonic hold over Western attitudes.

and as a reformulation in significant areas of the policy in which Israelis imagined themselves as Goliath, and their Other, the unarmed Palestinians asserting their nationalism, as David.

At the same time, the myth was consciously appropriated by Palestinians who 'returned to the ancient method: the sling and stone like David.' The image thus became recurrent in descriptions of the different means employed by both sides in the confrontations in this asymmetric warfare. Eitan Alimi argues that this transfer of the Israeli story into Palestinian hands gave the latter three advantages: it was a spiritual resource for insurgents against a strong army; it followed David's rejection of Saul's advice to employ armour and lethal weaponry in favour of techniques they were more traditionally familiar with; and it was newsworthy to face off Israeli tanks and heavily armed soldiers with stones and burning tires. Astute Palestinian planning to see that media representatives were present, despite Israeli efforts to hinder coverage, were demoralizing not only for Israel's foreign image, but to the parents of IDF soldiers watching the news. The international press, through television broadcasts of the uprising, contrasted heavily armed troops against rock-throwing boys as a 'David-and-Goliath standoff,' casting the Palestinians as the underdog. According to Stuart Eizenstat, the 'reverse David-and-Goliath image of Israelis with tanks against rock-throwing Palestinian teenagers' distorts foreign perceptions of Israel's battle against terrorism. It is argued that this asymmetric stand-off has reversed the traditional global impression of Israel as a David facing an Arab Goliath.

== Media coverage ==
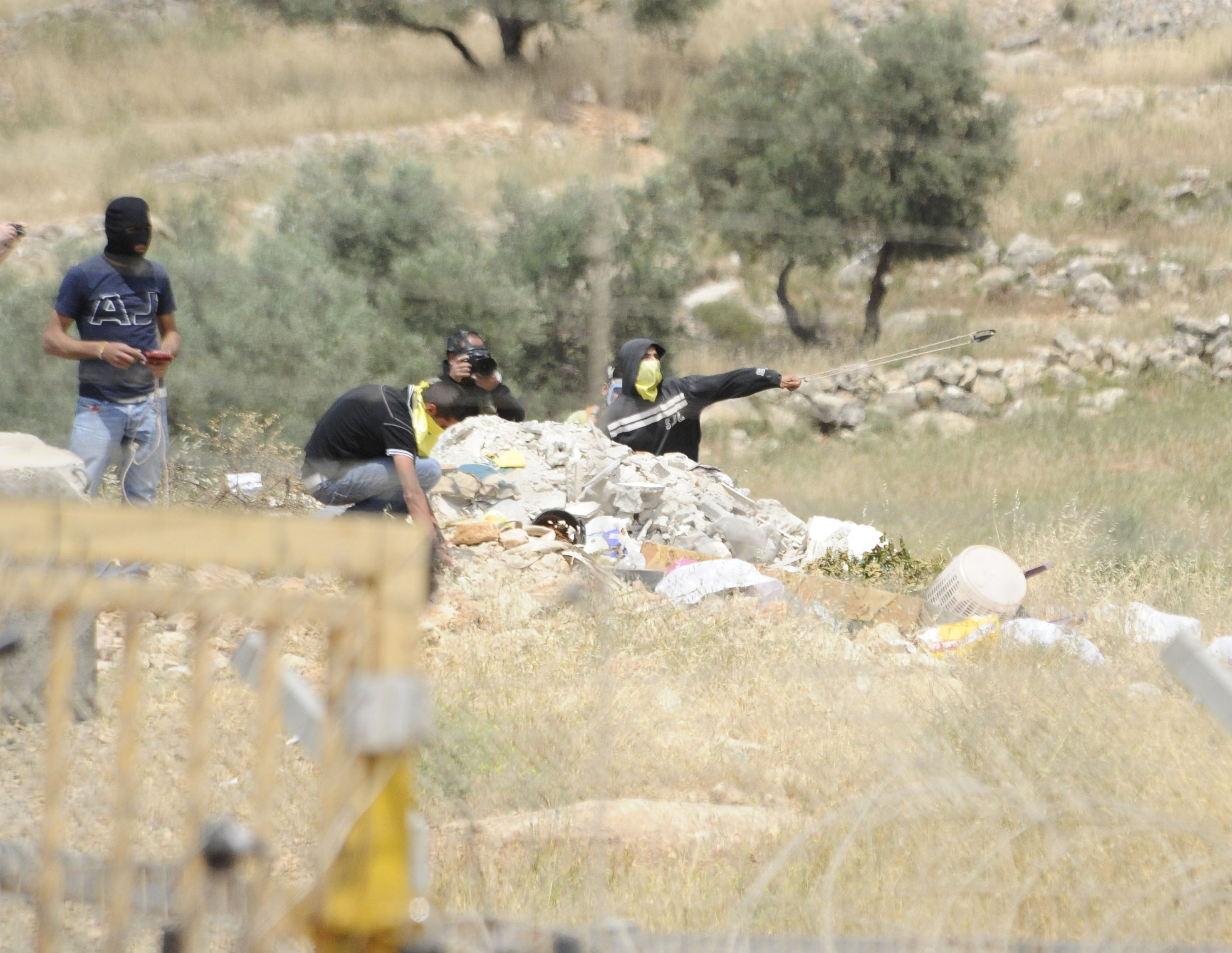
Slingshots used in a demonstration at Bil'in

A Palestinian throwing stones at soldiers using sling during weekly protest in Ni'lin.

In certain documented cases, Israeli undercover units have thrown stones at uniformed IDF and police alongside Palestinians. According to a Haaretz investigation, police testifying about clashes with protesters in Bil'in have in a number of cases given false testimony by claiming that rocks were being thrown in what were, on analysis, peaceful protests. In other cases in that village Israel Border Police were, nonetheless, injured by rock-throwing. At times false reports of Israelis being injured or killed by Palestinian stone-throwers have circulated. On 4 April 1988 an Israeli teenager, Tirza Porat from the settlement of Elon Moreh was said to have been killed by a stone thrown at a busload of teenagers passing through the village of Beita. Settlers called for the village to be razed, and 13 houses were demolished. Two days later, it emerged she had been shot in the head by a Jewish guard's bullet. Reports of stone throwing that lead to court cases have at times been dismissed, as trumped-up charges. A soldier, under arrest, swore in an affidavit that a certain Palestinian had thrown stones at him. The accused was shown to be physically disabled, and the case was dismissed, as was another in which a settler identified the defense lawyer, not his client, as the person who threw stones at him.

According to Louis J. Salome, newspapers buried reports critical of Israeli shootings of stone-throwers for fear of offending 'powerful Israeli and Jewish interests'.

Peter Beinart notes that similarities exist between political reactions in Israel and the United States to stone-throwing protests by Ethiopian Israelis and Afro-Americans. One condemns the violence, but calls are made to look into and attend to the problems that give rise to such episodes. He then asks why Israeli attitudes are different if the stone-throwers are Palestinians. In the former instances, he argues, the grievances behind the violence are acknowledged and promises are made to redress them. The IDF website brands all Palestinian stone throwing as 'unprovoked', and as 'threats to the stability of the region', and yet Beinart thinks it absurd to characterize behaviour by 'people who have lived for almost a half-century under military law and without free movement, citizenship or the right to vote,' unprovoked.

== Statistics ==
According to IDFG statistics, since 2004 an average of 4,066 stone throwing incidents are observed annually. The peak year was 2005, with 4,371 incidents. The lowest incidence was registered in 2007, when 3,501 events involving the throwing of stones at soldiers and passing cars were registered.

According to the Israeli police, in 2013 7,886 events of stone throwing were recorded in comparison to 18,726 of such events in 2014.

According to Israel's statistics, no IDF soldiers have died as a result of Palestinian stone throwing.

B'Tselem has asked the authorities to supply the relevant statistics for injuries sustained by this activity, but it was reported that the data is not collected.

== Reactions by Israelis ==
Settlers in the First Intifada reportedly followed the army's example after the Yesha Council approved shooting as a response to Palestinian stoning of cars even in situations where there was no threat to life. Settler militias began to initiate retaliations in the form of violent rampages against Arab 'terror', disrupting village routines, shooting at water tanks, setting cars on fire and burning agricultural fields. After one stone throwing incident Rabbi Eliezer Waldman led a rampage on a neighbouring village, where a mosque was burnt, and stated: "We have to shoot stone throwers. There is nothing more absurd, immoral and dangerous than to endanger ourselves in order to safeguard the attackers' lives."

During the period of the Second intifada, settlers organized 'independent armed patrols' employing firearms to shoot when they encountered stoning or road blocks and, according to an IDF commander, 'Almost any event of Palestinian attack elicits ad hoc a violent response that is organized by the settlers'.

== Participation by Palestinian children and women ==
Palestinian children routinely participate in incidents of stone throwing. Annually, Israeli military courts sentence approximately 700 Palestinian children, predominantly on charges of throwing stones. Under Israeli law children under 12 may neither be arrested nor detained, but a boy as young as 7 or 9, suspected of stoning a bus, has been detained for 4 hours on 30 April 2015. According to Reem Bahdi, between 2000 and 2008, 6,500 children were arrested, mostly for this activity. One study found that of 853 Palestinian children indicted by Israel for stone throwing between 2005 and 2010, 18 were between 12 and 13 years old; 255 were between 14 and 15; 60% received jail sentences of up to 2 months, 15% received over 6 months and 1% served a year in prison. According to B'Tselem from 2005 to 2010, 834 minors 17 and younger were brought before Israeli military courts on stone-throwing charges, a third, some 288, were between 12 and 15 years old. All but one were found guilty, mostly in plea bargains, and spent a few weeks to a few months in jail. Bahdi considers that Israel criminalizes stone throwing as a threat to state security. During the large-scale 2018 Gaza border protests, some Gazan women made collections of stones for youths whose eyes were blurry from the effects of tear-gas, in order to save them time.

== Israeli law ==
According to Al Jazeera, Israeli prosecutors usually ask for jail sentences of up to 3 months for rock throwing that does not cause serious injuries.

In response to the killing of Sergeant Almog Shiloni and the 2014 Alon Shvut stabbing attack, Israeli prime minister Benjamin Netanyahu convened a Security Cabinet meeting in which he announced that fines would be imposed on the parents of minors caught throwing stones. In November 2014, the Cabinet approved a preliminary draft of a bill that would, if passed, increase the legal penalties for stone throwing to up to 20 years imprisonment where there is intent to cause bodily harm. In May 2015, a version of the bill was adopted by the Cabinet that would also allow for a 10-year sentence without a requirement to prove the accused harboured an intention to harm. The approved amendment was proposed by Ayelet Shaked.

In November 2014, an Israeli court decided, for the first time, not to release a minor who was awaiting trial for stone throwing due to an upsurge in stone throwing in the Isawiya neighborhood in Jerusalem, where the 15-year-old lived. In response to the rise in stone-throwing incidents the Israeli military redefined the practice as a felony, a judgement backed by a High Court ruling. In cases where accidents or casualties result, the house of the youth's parents is demolished.

In June 2015, 4 Palestinians—3 of them minors—convicted of hurling large rocks at a car on Route 375, severely injuring Ziona Kala, were sentenced to between 7 and 8 years in prison. In September 2015, following other incidents on a road where stone throwing was frequent, Attorney General Yehuda Weinstein was asked by Benjamin Netanyahu to authorize live fire against stone-throwers in East Jerusalem. According to B'Tselem, if passed, the measure would contravene the recommendations for the restricted use of live fire set forth by the Or Commission in 2000. The Israeli Cabinet unanimously passed a proposal on 24 September to create a 4 year mandatory minimum sentence for adults throwing stones and Molotov cocktails. The measure allows police to open fire if any lives are perceived to be in danger, which is interpreted by Ynet to mean that minors can also be targeted. The families of minors between 14 and 18 found to have thrown rocks, Molotov cocktails, or firecrackers will be subject to fines and imprisonment.

Collective punishment has been used to obtain information about stone throwers. In April 2015, the 7,000 inhabitants of Hizma had all exits to their town closed down, until informers would emerge to tell the Israeli authorities who in their ranks had been responsible for stoning incidents. According to Haaretz, the police removed the sign explaining the move when an activist was observed filming in the area.

=== Contemporary cases ===
In recent years, the case of Mohammed Zaher Ibrahim, a 15-year-old Palestinian-American, has been cited as an example of how Israeli military law in the West Bank treats alleged stone-throwing by minors. Ibrahim was arrested at his home in February 2025 and accused solely of throwing stones at Israeli vehicles. He was held for nine months in Megiddo and Ofer prisons with limited family contact. His family and legal team stated that he denied hitting any vehicle and stated his confession was extracted under duress. More than 100 U.S.-based human rights, civil rights, and faith organizations called for his release, and members of the U.S. Congress raised concerns about his treatment. Diplomatic interventions by the U.S. State Department also helped draw increased attention to the case. Ibrahim was ultimately released in November 2025 following sustained advocacy by rights groups.

== Deaths and casualties ==
=== Victims of stone throwing ===
According to historian Rafael Medoff, 14 people have been killed by Palestinian stone throwing, including 3 Arabs mistaken for Jews by the rock throwers.

- Ester Ohana was the first Israeli killed by Palestinian stone throwing. She was killed on 29 January 1983 when a stone was thrown through the window of the car in which she was a passenger, hitting her in the head.
- On 5 June 2001, Yehuda Shoham, a 5-month-old baby, was killed when a rock hurled by stone throwing Palestinians crashed through the window of the car he was riding in, crushing his skull.
- On 23 September 2011, Asher (25) and Yonatan Palmer (1) were killed when the car Asher was driving was attacked by stone-throwing Palestinians, causing it to crash killing him along with his infant son.
- On 14 March 2013, the Biton's family car was attacked, near neighboring village of Kif el-Hares, with stones which caused it to get out of control and collide with a truck. Adele Biton was critically injured along with her mother and 3 sisters who were moderately injured, and died two years later.
- On 13 September 2015 Alexander Levlovich was killed by thrown rocks that caused his car to swerve out of control in a Jerusalem neighborhood.

=== Cement-block dropping ===
- On 24 February 1989, a cement block was dropped from a rooftop by a Fatah activist, Samir Na'neesh, onto the head of Staff Sergeant Binyamin Meisner, while he was patrolling the casbah in Nablus. The block crushed his skull, killing him.

== Evaluations ==
- For Amani Ezzat Ismail, Palestinians see stone throwing as a primitive method of retaliation, in a situation where power-equivalency is lacking: stones are deployed against Israeli soldiers who are armed and use rubber-coated bullets and, in major uprisings, missiles and helicopter gunships.
- Gene Sharp classifies stone throwing as a form of "limited violence", writing that, "Palestinians see the stones as a way of expressing their defiance and rage", but, in Sharp's opinion, the tactic is "counterproductive" because Israelis "almost never see a stone thrown at them as a relatively nonviolent (form of) expression".
- Colonel Thomas Hammes, an analyst of asymmetrical warfare, considers that the tactical use of stone throwing in the First Intifada was the key strategic move that enabled the Palestinian movement to "transformed (Israel) from the tiny, brave nation surrounded by hostile Arab nations to the oppressive state that condoned killing children in the street".
- University of Windsor professor of law Reem Bahdi argues that, while Israel justifies its use of phosphorus weaponry in areas where the civilian density is high, as in Gaza, as legitimate in international law, it criminalizes stone throwing as a threat to the security of the State.
- Thomas Friedman argued that stone throwing is compatible with "the teachings of Mahatma Gandhi".
- Jodi Rudoren, writing for the New York Times, states that many Palestinians see stone throwing as, "a rite of passage and an honored act of defiance".
- Amira Hass in an article published the day after a Palestinian stone-thrower was convicted of the Murder of an Israeli settler and his son has defended Palestinian stone–throwing as the, "birthright and duty of anyone subject to foreign rule", and as "a metaphor of resistance".
- Israeli pro-Palestinian anarchist Jonathan Pollak argues that stone throwing is one form of violence that is at times necessary and moral, as an act of collective empowerment that enables the occupied people to avoid the traps of victimization.
- Marouf Hasian and Lisa A. Flores have the interpreted stone throwing that took place during the First Intifada as a means of creating a collective identity, a historical tradition, and – ultimately – a Palestinian nation.
- David A. McDonald understands stone throwing as a "resistance performance... strategically engineered to reinforce the sacred relationship between the nation and the land".
- Palestinian intellectual Edward Said, then terminally ill, threw a stone across the border on 3 July 2000 while visiting Lebanon, with no Israeli in sight. When the incident attracted international attention, and it was adduced as proof he was a terrorist, Said justified it as a, 'symbolic gesture of joy' at the end of Israel's occupation of southern Lebanon. In one of his essays, he wrote of Palestinian youths who, 'with stones and an unbent political will standing fearlessly against the blows of well-armed Israeli soldiers, backed by one of the world's mightiest defence establishments, bankrolled unflinchingly and unquestioningly by the world's wealthiest nation, supported faithfully and smilingly by a whole apparatus of intellectual lackeys.'
- Azmi Bishara, Israeli-Palestinian politician and academic, denies that stone throwing is a weapon or guerrilla tactic: it symbolizes, he argues, "nakedness against the occupier . . the non-accessibility of weapons in the hands of the people.'
- Todd May says that "technically, the throwing of stones is not a form of nonviolent resistance" but that it sets in motion the same dynamics as actions that are.
- Robert L. Holmes says that "stone-throwing, as pathetically ineffectual as it is as a military tactic against heavily armed soldiers, is still a form of violence, as is the throwing of firebombs and the dropping of blocks from buildings."
- Julie M. Norman says that throwing stones is a "'limited violence' tactic", and notes that a majority of Palestinian youth surveyed consider it nonviolent.
- Mary Elizabeth King says that throwing stones or petrol bombs is a violent action, but that "to many Palestinians the hurled stones were meant to impede and harass - not kill - the occupying Israeli military forces and Israelis settlers in the West Bank and Gaza".

== In popular culture ==
Many popular songs and poems, some written in admiration by other Arabs, such as the Syrian Nizar Qabbani, dwell on the function of stones in expressing the identity of Palestinians and their land.

In Palestinian theatre, a play staged at the beginning time of the First Intifada (1987) bore the title Alf Layla wa-Layla min Layāli Rāmi al-Ḥijāra, (A Thousand and One Nights of the Nights of a Stone Thrower) and portrayed an encounter between an Israeli military governor and a Palestinian youth who is represented as a Palestinian David facing down an Israeli Goliath and his well-equipped warriors. The military governor loses, and the narrator comments:

'Already a man by the age of ten, the stone thrower child's game with the stones became a gesture of a free man. He saw that nothing remained but the stones themselves to defend his home from the gluttony of the governor, who was gobbling away at the trees, the stars and the sun.'

The leader of the troupe François Abū Sālim, was subsequently arrested for staging the play.

In Michel Khleifi's 1990 film on the First Intifada, Canticle of the Stones, a woman collapses on seeing her house demolished by an Israeli bulldozer, and another woman comments: 'Even if every Palestinian dies, the stones will throw themselves by themselves.'

Slingshot Hip Hop is a 2008 documentary film about Palestinian youth culture and hip hop music.

The 2012 film Rock the Casbah deals with the struggle of Israeli soldiers and Arab civilians to deal with, "asymmetrical warfare i(n which) one side has guns, the other merely rocks," after an incident where a washing machine is dropped onto, and kills, a soldier.

== See also ==
- Jewish Israeli stone-throwing
- Palestinian political violence
- Stone pelting in Kashmir
- Serhildan
- Stoning
- Timeline of the Israeli–Palestinian conflict

== Sources ==
- Graff, James A. (2015). "Targeting Children: Rights versus Realpolitik". In Kapitan, Tomis (ed.). Philosophical Perspectives on the Israeli-Palestinian Conflict (2nd ed.). Routledge. pp. 157–184. ISBN 978-1-317-46285-9.
- Hajjar, Lisa (2005). Courting Conflict: The Israeli Military Court System in the West Bank and Gaza. University of California Press. ISBN 978-0-520-24194-7.
- ICG (20 December 2012). Extreme Makeover? (II): The Withering of Arab Jerusalem (PDF). International Crisis Group. Archived from the original (PDF) on 12 May 2019.
- Peteet, Julie (May 1996). "The Writing on the Walls: The Graffiti of the Intifada". Cultural Anthropology. 11 (2): 139–159. doi:10.1525/can.1996.11.2.02a00010. JSTOR 656446. S2CID 143605458.
- Punamäki, Raija-Leena (Summer 1988). "Experiences of Torture, Means of Coping, and Level of Symptoms among PalestinianPolitical Prisoners". Journal of Palestine Studies. 17 (4): 81–96. doi:10.2307/2537292. JSTOR 2537292.
- Thrall, Nathan (2017). The Only Language They Understand: Forcing Compromise in Israel and Palestine. Henry Holt and Company. ISBN 978-1-627-79710-8.

== Bibliography ==
- David A. McDonald, 'Performative Politics: Folklore and Popular resistance in the First Palestine Intifada,' in Moslih Kanaaneh, Stig-Magnus Thorsén, Heather Bursheh, David A. McDonald (eds.) Palestinian Music and Song: Expression and Resistance since 1900, Indiana University Press, 2013 pp123–140, p. 133.
