= Killing of Esther Ohana =

Esther Ohana (Hebrew: אסתר אוחנה; Alt: Ester Ohana) was an Israeli woman who was killed by a rock thrown by a Palestinian Arab through the window of the vehicle in which she was riding on 29 January 1983, hitting her directly in the head. Ohana never regained consciousness and died two weeks later in hospital.

Ohana was the first Israeli to be killed by a Palestinian stone-throwing attack.

== Attack ==
The attack took place on the Beersheva - Hebron road, where it passed through the Arab town of Dhahiriya. Ohana, a civilian social worker from Beit Shean, was riding in a private vehicle driven by an army officer at the time of the attack. Ohana was taken to a hospital, she died on 12 February without ever having regained consciousness. She was to have been married a week later.

=== Search for killers and curfew ===
Israel immediately imposed a curfew on Dahariya, permitting residents to leave their houses only during a 2-hour period each day as police sought clues to the identity of the perpetrators. After three weeks, 5 suspects were arrested and the curfew was lifted.

=== Conviction and sentencing ===
Five youths were convicted of "deliberately causing death" and sentenced to between 11 and 13 years in prison. Four of the youths confessed to having thrown rocks at the car in which Ohana was a passenger, the fifth confessed to being the leader of the "terrorist cell," but stated that he had not personally thrown rocks. No penalty was imposed on the house of the man who did not throw stones. The houses of the four who threw stones were "forfeited and sealed off" under Regulation 119. The penalty was upheld on appeal on the grounds that it is the "duty and right" of the Military Commander "to protect all people using public roads, Jews and Arabs alike; given the plague of throwing stones."

== Impact ==
Addressing the Knesset's Foreign Affairs and Security Committee, General Rafael Eitan is reported to have urged that "for every stone that the Arabs throw in the West Bank, ten new settlements should be built." In April, Israel announced that it would expand 68 West Bank settlements, increasing the Jewish population of the West Bank from 30,000 to 50,000.

On January 31, 1983 the Israeli cabinet approved the establishment of the West Bank settlement of Teneh Omarim as a Nahal post by 21 members of the Socialist-Zionist Hashomer Hatzair movement who had intended to settle at Kibbutz Nir Oz in the Negev, and instead settled at Teneh Omarim, near the road where Ohana had been killed two days before.

== Context ==
Five years later, during the First Intifada, a Jewish civilian, Vardi Bamberger, 25, of Pesagot, was severely injured when rocks were thrown at the vehicle in which she was riding at the same spot where Ester Ohana was killed. Bamberger suffered a fractured skull, but survived.
