= Murder of Ofir Rahum =

Killing of Israeli teen by Palestinian gunmen

- Part of the Second Intifada militancy campaign
- Location: Outskirts of Ramallah, West Bank
- Date: 17 January 2001
- Attack type: Shooting attack
- Deaths: a 16-year-old Israeli civilian (Ofir Rahum)
- Perpetrators: Three Palestinian gunmen (Mona Jaud Awana, Hassan Alkadi, and Abdul Fatah Doleh)

The murder of Ofir Rahum (Hebrew: אופיר רחום) was a shooting attack which occurred on 17 January 2001, in which Palestinian militants from the Tanzim faction of Fatah killed 16-year-old Israeli high school student Ofir Rahum on the outskirts of Ramallah.

The murder was planned and initiated by 24-year-old Mona Jaud Awana from Bir Nabala. After many weeks in which Mona conducted long private conversations in English with Rahum through the instant messenger program ICQ, during which she masqueraded as a Jewish immigrant from Morocco named Sally, Mona managed to gain his confidence and get him to meet with her in Jerusalem, supposedly for romantic purposes. When he arrived for the meeting, she drove him through the border control into the Palestinian-controlled territory and towards a secluded area on the outskirts of Ramallah where Palestinian terrorists shot him at close range, with Mona standing aside and watching.

== Background ==
Ofir Rahum

Mona Awana, later arrested by the Israeli police, stated that on the day of the lynching of two Israeli soldiers in Ramallah in late 2000 by a Palestinian crowd, she decided to abduct an Israeli and murder him. Mona had been present at the Ramallah lynching, and said she was "excited" by what she saw. Soon after, she began contacting Israelis on the Internet. Awana chatted with several Israeli teenagers on chat rooms and engaged in an online romance with Rahum. In conversations over several months she pressed for a meeting in Jerusalem. When Rahum suggested a venue closer to his home, she claimed she had no car but promised to arrange for his return by 5 pm. Employing sexual innuendos, she persuaded him to meet her. Two days before the murder, she wrote, "You don't know how much I am waiting for Wednesday." When they met, she convinced him to accompany her to Ramallah.

== Murder ==
On 17 January 2001, Mona and Rahum met at the central bus station in Jerusalem, spoke briefly in English, and then got on a taxi which drove to the el-Ram intersection. From there they drove in a Ford Escort with Israeli license plates, through the border control into the Palestinian-controlled territory and towards the outskirts of Ramallah. When Rahum questioned Mona why they were traveling through Arab-dominant areas, Mona replied that "that's the way it is in Jerusalem, which has both Arab and Jewish neighborhoods."

At 11:30, Mona stopped the car at a secluded area on the outskirts of Ramallah next to a car with Palestinian license plates, at a location which was chosen in advance with the Palestinian militant cell. Mona immediately jumped out of the vehicle, while the militants, Hassan Alkadi and Abdul Fatah Doleh, armed with rifles, got out of their car and shot Rahum from close range more than 15 times, while all along Mona was standing aside and watching. Afterwards, the assailants threw Rahum's body into the trunk and fled to Ramallah.

The assailants secretly buried Rahum's body in the al-Tira neighborhood in Ramallah.

== Investigation ==
After Rahum did not return home from school, his family began looking for him, and found out that he did not go to school that day. Following further investigation by the Israeli Shin Bet security agency and the Israeli International Crimes Unit, it was revealed that Rahum corresponded with Mona through the Internet and that she pressed Rahum to meet with her in Jerusalem, and that she promised to have intimate relations with him.

Meanwhile, an undercover Israeli Duvdevan Unit force, in conjunction with the Shin Bet, raided Mona's house in Bir Nabala and managed to apprehend Mona. She was later interrogated by the Shin Bet.

On 18 January, Palestinian security forces located Rahum's body and brought it to the Ramallah hospital. A short time later, his body was transferred to Israel.

Although Mona initially refused to cooperate with the investigators, she broke down after about four weeks and gave a full confession of her involvement in the murder, and revealed the identities of her partners in crime – the senior Ramallah-area Fatah Tanzim operatives Hassan Alkadi and Abdul Fatah Doleh of Beitunia.

== Aftermath ==
The murder caused great shock amongst the Israeli public. The Israeli Prime Minister and Defense Minister Ehud Barak stated in response to the murder that the attack was a "heinous crime committed by vile killers, lacking human dignity. The Security forces will not spare any effort to reach the murderers so that they would be punished severely." Thousands of people attended Rahum's funeral which was held on 19 January at noon in the Ashkelon cemetery. Rahum's gravestone was built in the form of a personal computer. Israel's Permanent Representative to the United Nations wrote to the Secretary-General to protest the "recent acts of Palestinian terrorism directed against Israeli civilians".

Awana was tried, and eventually convicted of murder in February 2003 and sentenced to life imprisonment. She was later transferred to the Neveh Tirza prison in 2006 after attacking another inmate. In 2007, Awana went on a hunger strike to protest her conditions in prison as she was kept in her cell up to 23 hours per day and later in June 2008, she was transferred to Damon Prison in northern Israel.

Though the Israeli government initially said that Awana would not be part of the deal, she was released to Gaza on 18 October 2011 as part of the Gilad Shalit prisoner exchange between Israel and Hamas. Awana is now residing in exile in Turkey.

== Abbas-Awana meeting ==
On 20 December 2011, Palestinian leader Mahmoud Abbas privately met Awana in Ankara, for which he was criticized by Israel. Abbas said that the release of the remaining Palestinian prisoners in Israel was at the top of the Palestinian agenda. An Israeli government spokesman said that the Israeli government was "disappointed" by this decision, and that "instead of promoting peace and reconciliation, the Palestinian leadership seems to be putting extremist murderers up on a pedestal. This raises serious questions as to their commitment and as to their desire to end the conflict."

== See also ==
- Internet relationship
- Palestinian political violence
