= Murder of Helena Rapp =

1992 Palestinian terrorist attack in Bat Yam, Israel

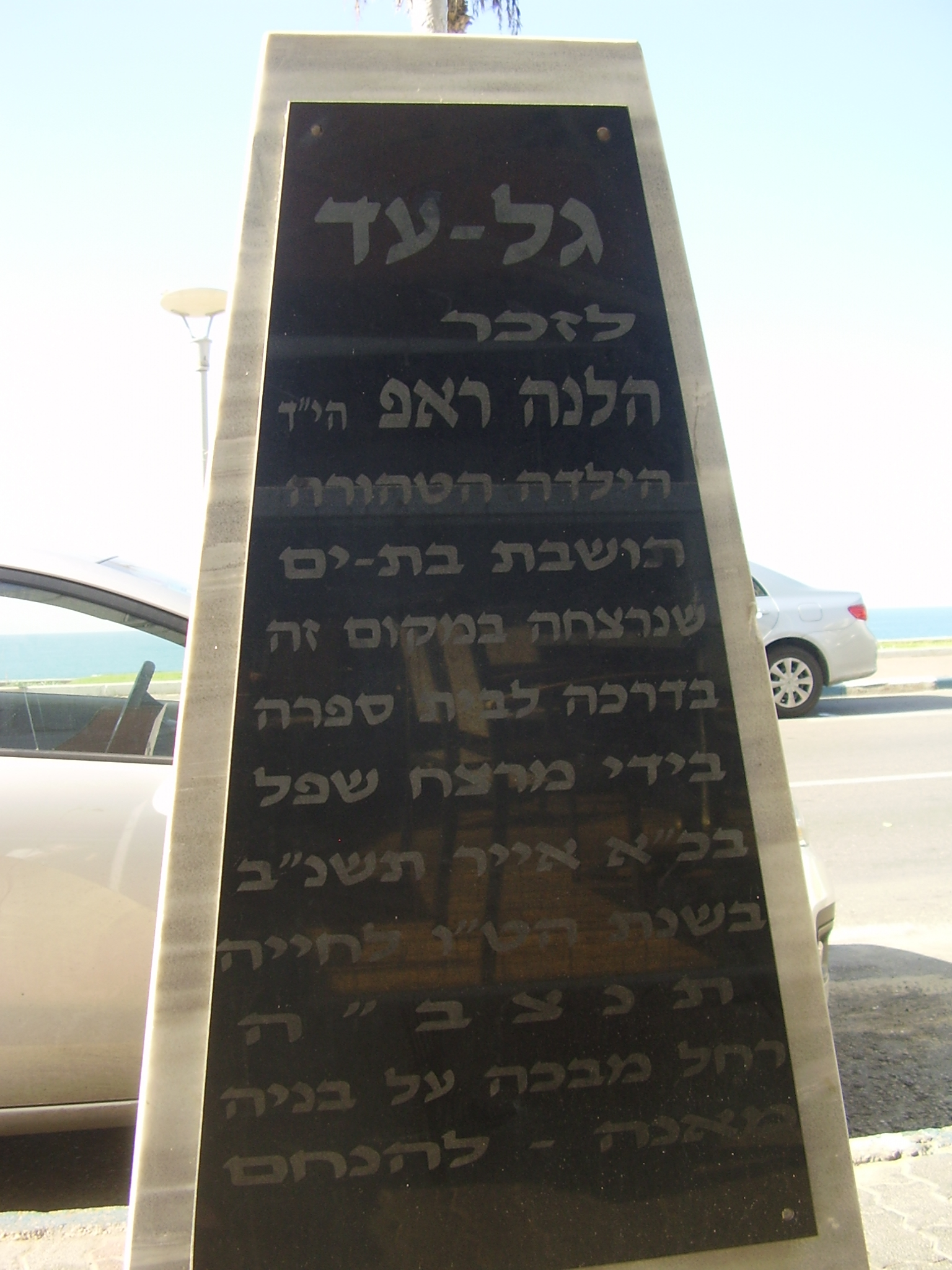
- Helena Rapp monument on Ben Gurion street, Bat Yam

- The attack site
- Native name: רצח הלנה ראפ
- Location: 32°01′16″N 34°44′22″E; Bat Yam promenade, Israel
- Date: 24 May 1992; 34 years ago c. 7:30 am (UTC+2)
- Attack type: Stabbing attack
- Weapon: Knife
- Victims: 15-year-old Israeli schoolgirl Helena Rapp
- Perpetrator: Islamic Jihad claimed responsibility
- Assailant: Fouad Abd El Hani El Omrin
- No. of participants: 1

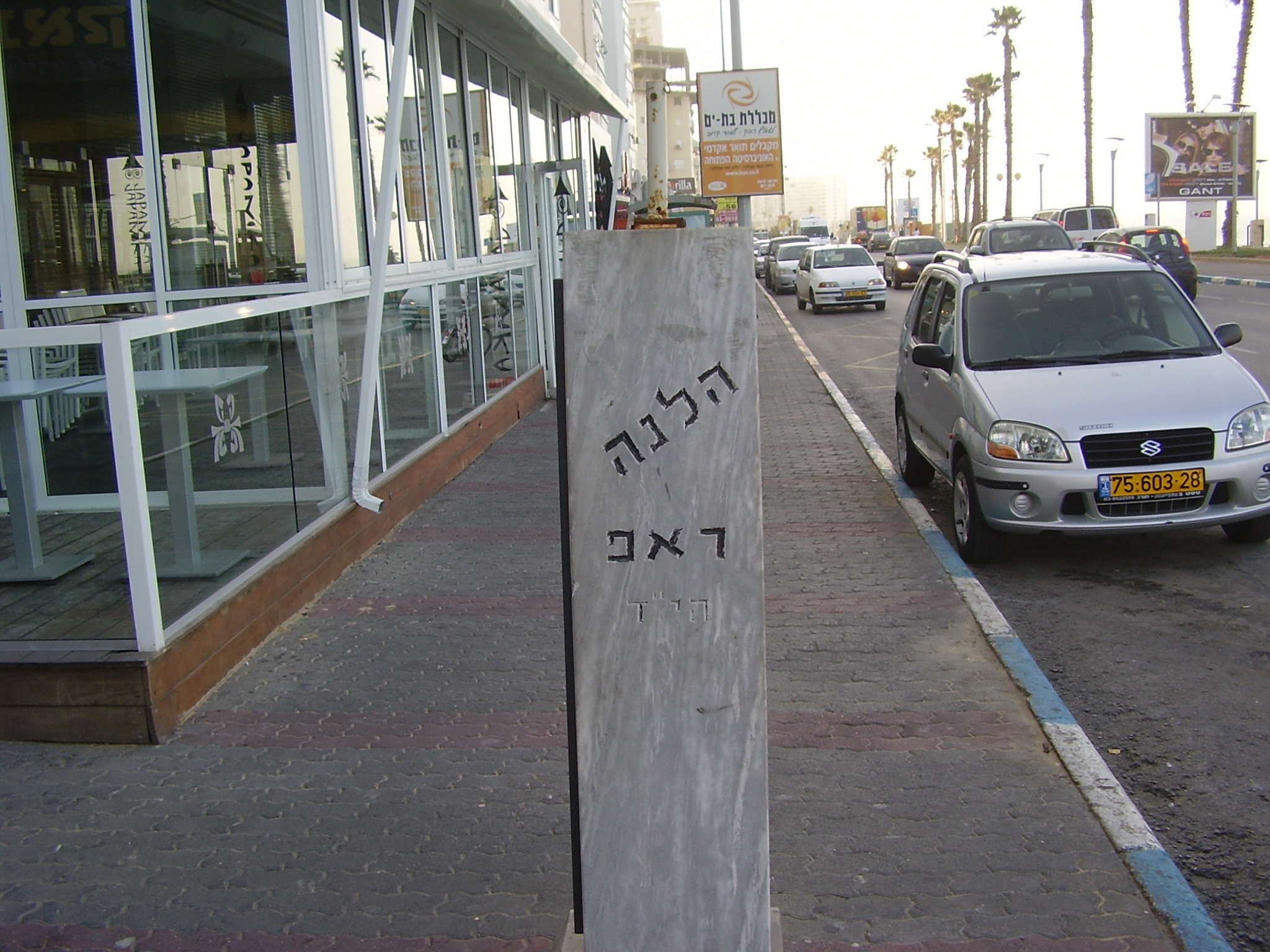
Helena Rapp monument on Ben Gurion street, Bat Yam

The murder of Helena Rapp occurred on 24 May 1992 when a Palestinian stabbed 15-year-old Israeli Helena Rapp to death in the Israeli coastal city of Bat Yam. The attack shocked the Israeli public as one of the more prominent of a series of stabbing attacks that took place in Israel during the early 1990s. Following the attack, riots broke out in Bat Yam until they were dispersed by police five days later. The attacks signified to many Israelis a deterioration of their personal security. The killer was later freed as part of a prisoner exchange between Israel and Hamas.

== Attack ==
On 24 May 1992, at around 7:30 am, 18-year-old Palestinian Fuad Muhammad Abdulhadi Amrin stabbed to death 15-year-old Israeli Helena Rapp at the corner of Ben-Gurion and Jabotinsky streets in Bat Yam while she was on her way to her school bus stop.

== Aftermath ==
Amrin was arrested and sentenced to life imprisonment. The Islamic Jihad claimed responsibility for the attack.

Following the attack, thousands of Bat Yam residents rioted in the streets of the city for five days without significant interference, causing heavy damage to property while occasionally attacking random Arab-looking by-passers.

Among the organizers of the riots was Baruch Marzel, who was later sentenced to 8 months probation for his part in the riots. After 5 days, during which Helena Rapp's father Ze'ev Rapp encouraged the riots, he eventually responded to a police request to help disperse the rioters and as a result the riots subsided. In the Or Commission Israeli Chief of Police Assaf Hefetz criticized the way the police handled the rioting after Rapp's murder and claimed that the riots should have been dispersed much earlier.

After the incident, Ze'ev Rapp, Helena's father, devoted his life to commemorating his daughter and to public activities as the chairman of the Israeli Victims of Terror Attacks Organization.

Following the attack, which took place during the 1992 Israeli legislative elections, many Israeli politicians showed up in Bat Yam and/or spoke out about the attack. The Minister of Police Roni Milo and the leader of the right-wing nationalist Moledet party Rehavam Ze'evi were present at Helena Rapp's funeral. Labor Party politician Shimon Peres arrived in Bat-Yam and despite some concerns was welcomed by local residents. Much of the Israeli public blamed the right-winged Shamir government for the deterioration to the personal security of Israelis during this period. Videos of the rioting that took place in Bat Yam were featured in Labor Party electoral ads which blamed the deteriorating security situation on the Likud government.

=== Release of assailant ===
On 18 October 2011, Fuad Muhammad Abdulhadi Amrin, who was originally sentenced to life imprisonment, was released to Gaza as part of the Gilad Shalit prisoner exchange between Israel and Hamas.
