= Sharm El Sheikh summit =

There are two Sharm El Sheikh summits:

- 2005 Sharm El Sheikh Summit
- 2025 Sharm El Sheikh Summit
