= Second Intifada =

2000–2005 Palestinian uprising against Israeli occupation

- Part of the Israeli–Palestinian conflict
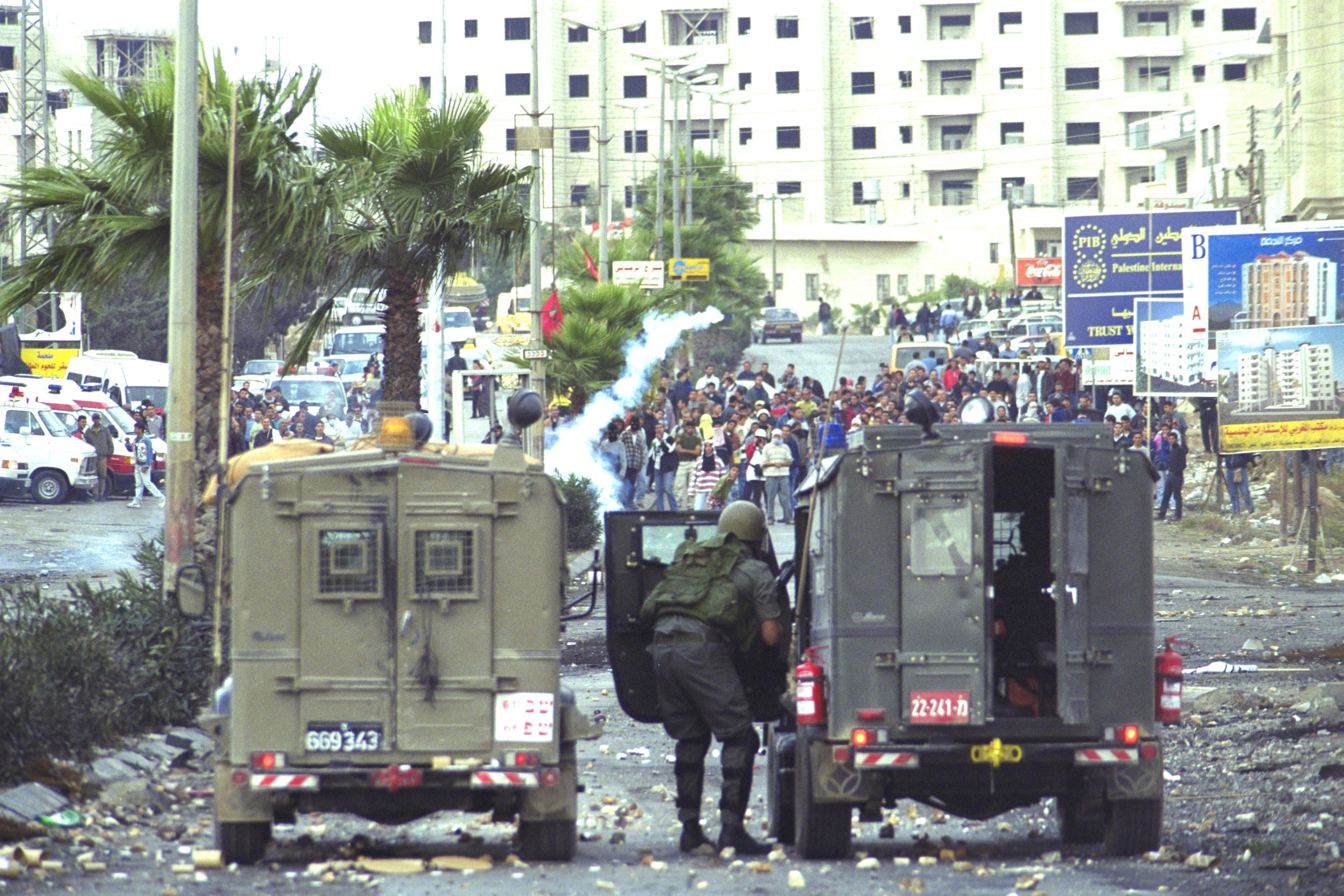
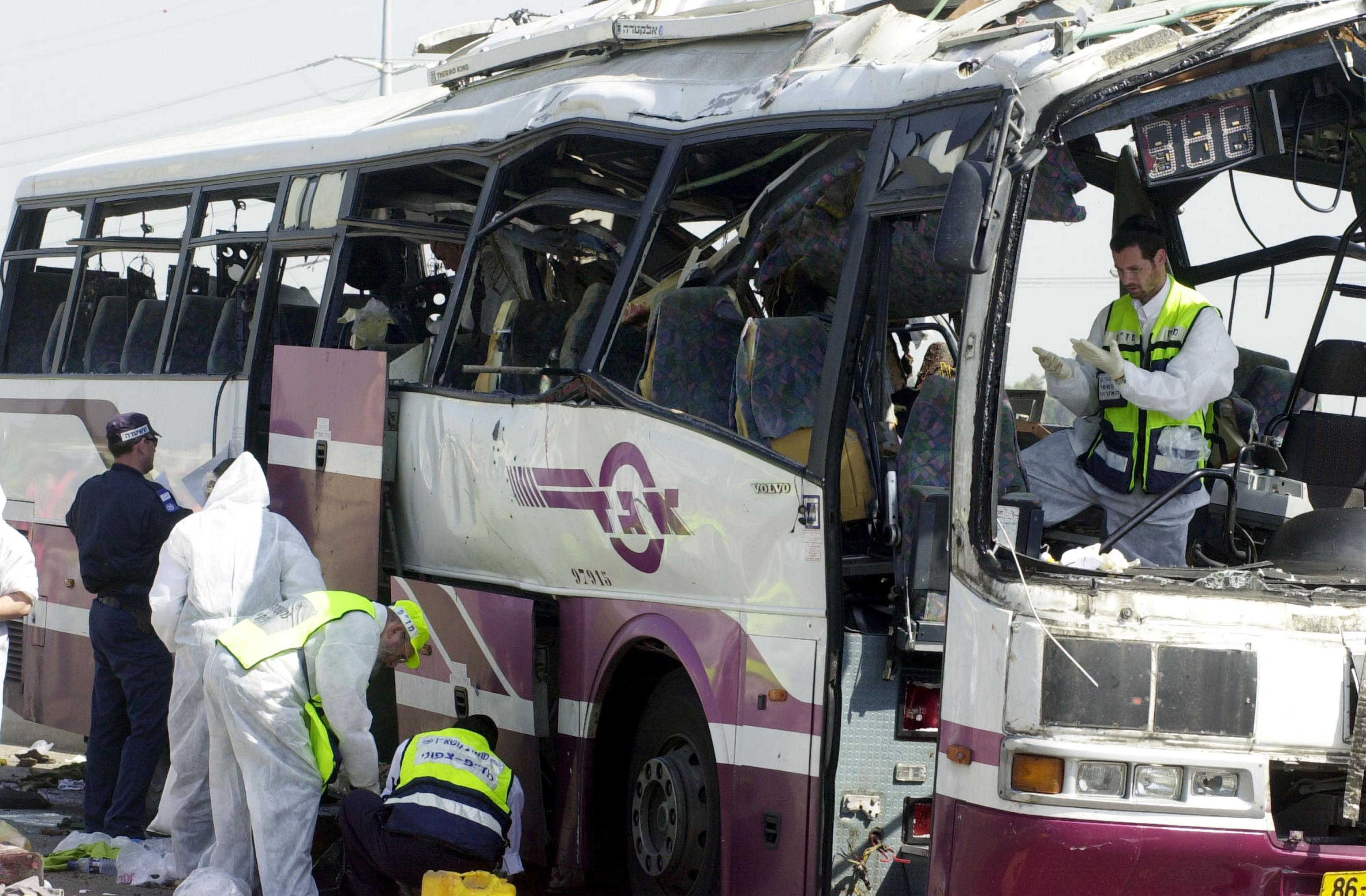
- Clockwise from top-left: Palestinian child Faris Odeh throws a stone at an Israeli tank in the Gaza Strip; Israeli soldiers in Nablus during Operation Defensive Shield; Aftermath of a Palestinian suicide bombing on a public transit bus near Haifa; Palestinian protesters confront Israeli security forces near Ramallah
Date	28 September 2000 – 8 February 2005 (4 years, 4 months, 1 week and 4 days)
Location	Israel; Israeli-occupied Palestinian territories
Result	Uprising suppressed
Territorial changes	Israeli forces withdraw from the Gaza Strip; Israel initiates the Gaza disengagement plan; Israel constructs the West Bank barrier

Belligerents
Israel	Palestinian Authority; PLO; Fatah; Popular Front for the Liberation of Palestine; Democratic Front for the Liberation of Palestine; Hamas; Palestinian Islamic Jihad; Popular Resistance Committees

Commanders and leaders
(Israel) Ariel Sharon; (Israel) Avi Dichter; (Israel) Ehud Barak; (Israel) Shaul Mofaz; (Israel) Moshe Ya'alon; (Israel) Dan Halutz; (Israel) Gabi Ashkenazi; (Israel) Dror Weinberg †; (Israel) Yehuda Edri †	(Palestine) Yasser Arafat #; (Palestine) Mahmoud Abbas; (Palestine) Marwan Barghouti (POW); (Palestine) Abu Ali Mustafa X; (Palestine) Ahmad Sa'adat (POW); (Palestine) Nayef Hawatmeh; (Palestine) Ahmed Yassin X; (Palestine) Abdel Aziz al-Rantisi X; (Palestine) Khaled Mashal; (Palestine) Ismail Haniyeh; (Palestine) Mohammed Deif; Abd Al Aziz Awda; Ramadan Shalah; Jamal Abu Samhadana

Units involved
Israel Defense Forces; Israel Police; Border Police; Civil Guard; Shin Bet; Mishmeret Yesha	Palestinian Security Services; National Security Forces; Preventative Security Service; (Fatah) Al-Aqsa Martyrs' Brigades; (Fatah) Tanzim; Abu Ali Mustafa Brigades; National Resistance Brigades; (Hamas) Al-Qassam Brigades; Al-Quds Brigades; Al-Nasser Salah al-Deen Brigades

Casualties and losses
29 September 2000 – 1 January 2005: ~1,010 Israelis total: • 644–773 Israeli civilians killed by Palestinians; • 215–301 Israeli troops killed by Palestinians	29 September 2000 – 1 January 2005: 3,179–3,354 Palestinians total: • 2,739–3,168 Palestinians killed by Israeli troops;* • 152–406 Palestinians killed by Palestinians; • 34 Palestinians killed by Israeli civilians
- 55 foreign nationals/citizens total: • 45 foreigners killed by Palestinians; • 10 foreigners killed by Israeli troops
- *For the controversial issue of distinguishing Palestinian civilian/combatant casualties, see § Casualties.

The Second Intifada (Arabic: الانتفاضة الثانية, romanized: al-Intifāḍa aṯ-Ṯāniya, lit. 'The Second Uprising'; Hebrew: האינתיפאדה השנייה, romanized: ha-Intifada ha-Shniya), also known as the Al-Aqsa Intifada, was a major uprising by Palestinians against Israel and its occupation from 2000. Initially sparked by civilian protests by Arab residents in East Jerusalem and areas within Israel proper, the uprising escalated into a prolonged period of heightened violence in Israel, the West Bank and the Gaza Strip. This violence, which included shootings, suicide bombings, and military operations, continued until the Sharm el-Sheikh Summit of 2005, which ended hostilities.

The general triggers for the unrest are speculated to have been centered on the failure of the 2000 Camp David Summit, which was expected to reach a final agreement on the Israeli–Palestinian peace process in July 2000. An uptick in violent incidents started in September 2000, after Israeli politician Ariel Sharon made a provocative visit to the Temple Mount; the visit itself was peaceful, but, as anticipated, sparked protests and riots that Israeli police put down with rubber bullets, live ammunition, and tear gas. Israeli security responded with extreme violence, killing at least 47 Palestinian protesters within the first five days. Within the first few days of the uprising, the Israeli military fired one million rounds of ammunition.

A prominent feature of the Second Intifada was a series of suicide bombings carried out by Palestinian militant groups. After March 2001, approximately 138 suicide bombings were conducted by these factions, primarily targeting Israeli civilians. Israeli security forces engaged in gunfights, targeted killings, tank attacks, and airstrikes; Palestinians engaged in gunfights, stone-throwing, and rocket attacks. With a combined casualty figure for combatants and civilians, the violence is estimated to have resulted in the deaths of approximately 3,000 Palestinians and 1,000 Israelis, as well as 64 foreign nationals.

The Second Intifada ended with the Sharm el-Sheikh Summit of 2005, as Palestinian president Mahmoud Abbas and Sharon, by then Israel's prime minister, agreed to take definitive steps to de-escalate the hostilities. They also reaffirmed their commitment to the "roadmap for peace" that had been proposed by the Quartet on the Middle East in 2003. Additionally, Sharon agreed to release 900 Palestinian prisoners and further stated that Israeli troops would withdraw from those parts of the West Bank that they had re-occupied while fighting Palestinian militants during the uprising.

== Etymology ==
Second Intifada refers to a second Palestinian uprising, following the first Palestinian uprising, which occurred between December 1987 and 1993. "Intifada" (انتفاضة) translates into English as "uprising". Its root is an Arabic word meaning "the shaking off". It has been used in the meaning of "insurrection" in various Arab countries; the Egyptian riots of 1977, for example, were called the "bread intifada". The term refers to a revolt against the Israeli occupation of the Palestinian territories.

Al-Aqsa Intifada refers to Al-Aqsa, the main name for the mosque compound constructed in the 8th century CE atop the Temple Mount in the Old City of Jerusalem, and also known to Muslims as the Haram al-Sharif.

The Intifada is sometimes called the Oslo War (מלחמת אוסלו) by some Israelis who consider it to be the result of concessions made by Israel following the Oslo Accords, and Arafat's War, after the late Palestinian leader whom some blamed for starting it. Others have named what they consider disproportionate response to what was initially a popular uprising by unarmed demonstrators as the reason for the escalation of the Intifada into an all-out war.

== Background ==
=== Oslo Accords ===
Under the Oslo Accords, signed in 1993 and 1995, Israel committed to the phased withdrawal of its forces from parts of the Gaza Strip and West Bank, and affirmed the Palestinian right to self-government within those areas through the creation of a Palestinian Authority. For their part, the Palestine Liberation Organization formally recognised Israel and committed to adopting responsibility for internal security in population centres in the areas evacuated. Palestinian self-rule was to last for a five-year interim period during which a permanent agreement would be negotiated. However, the realities on the ground left both sides deeply disappointed with the Oslo process. Palestinian freedom of movement reportedly worsened from 1993 to 2000. Israelis and Palestinians have blamed each other for the failure of the Oslo peace process. In the five years immediately following the signing of the Oslo accords, 405 Palestinians and 256 Israelis were killed.

From 1996 Israel made extensive contingency plans and preparations, collectively code-named "Musical Charm", in the eventuality that peace talks might fail. In 1998, after concluding that the 5-year plan stipulated in the Oslo Talks would not be completed, the IDF implemented an Operation Field of Thorns plan to conquer towns in Area C, and some areas of Gaza, and military exercises at regimental level were carried out in April 2000 to that end. Palestinian preparations were defensive, and small-scale, more to reassure the local population than to cope with an eventual attack from Israel. The intensity of these operations led one Brigadier General, Zvi Fogel to wonder whether Israel's military preparations would not turn out to be a self-fulfilling prophecy.

In 1995, Shimon Peres took the place of Yitzhak Rabin, who had been assassinated by Yigal Amir, a Jewish extremist opposed to the Oslo peace agreement. In the 1996 elections, Israelis elected a right-wing coalition led by the Likud candidate, Benjamin Netanyahu who was followed in 1999 by the Labor Party leader Ehud Barak.

=== Camp David Summit ===
From 11 to 25 July 2000, the Middle East Peace Summit at Camp David was held between the United States President Bill Clinton, Israeli Prime Minister Ehud Barak, and Palestinian Authority Chairman Yasser Arafat. The talks ultimately failed with each side blaming the other. There were five principal obstacles to agreement: borders and territorial contiguity, Jerusalem and the Temple Mount, Palestinian refugees and their right of return, Israeli security concerns and Israeli settlements. Disappointment at the situation over the summer led to a significant fracturing of the PLO as many Fatah factions abandoned it to join Hamas and Islamic Jihad.

On 13 September 2000, Yasser Arafat and the Palestinian Legislative Council postponed the planned unilateral declaration of an independent Palestinian state.

=== Israeli settlements ===
While Peres had limited settlement construction at the request of US Secretary of State, Madeleine Albright, Netanyahu continued construction within existing Israeli settlements and put forward plans for the construction of a new neighbourhood, Har Homa, in East Jerusalem. However, he fell far short of the Shamir government's 1991–92 level and refrained from building new settlements, although the Oslo agreements stipulated no such ban. Construction of housing units before Oslo, 1991–92: 13,960; after Oslo, 1994–95: 3,840; 1996–1997: 3,570.

To marginalise the settlers' more militant wing, Barak courted moderate settler opinion, securing agreement for the dismantlement of 12 new outposts that had been constructed since the Wye River Agreement of November 1998, but the continued expansion of existing settlements with plans for 3,000 new houses in the West Bank drew strong condemnation from the Palestinian leadership. Though construction within existing settlements was permitted under the Oslo agreements, Palestinian supporters contend that any continued construction was contrary to its spirit, prejudiced the outcome of final status negotiations, and undermined Palestinian confidence in Barak's desire for peace.

== Timeline ==
=== 2000 ===
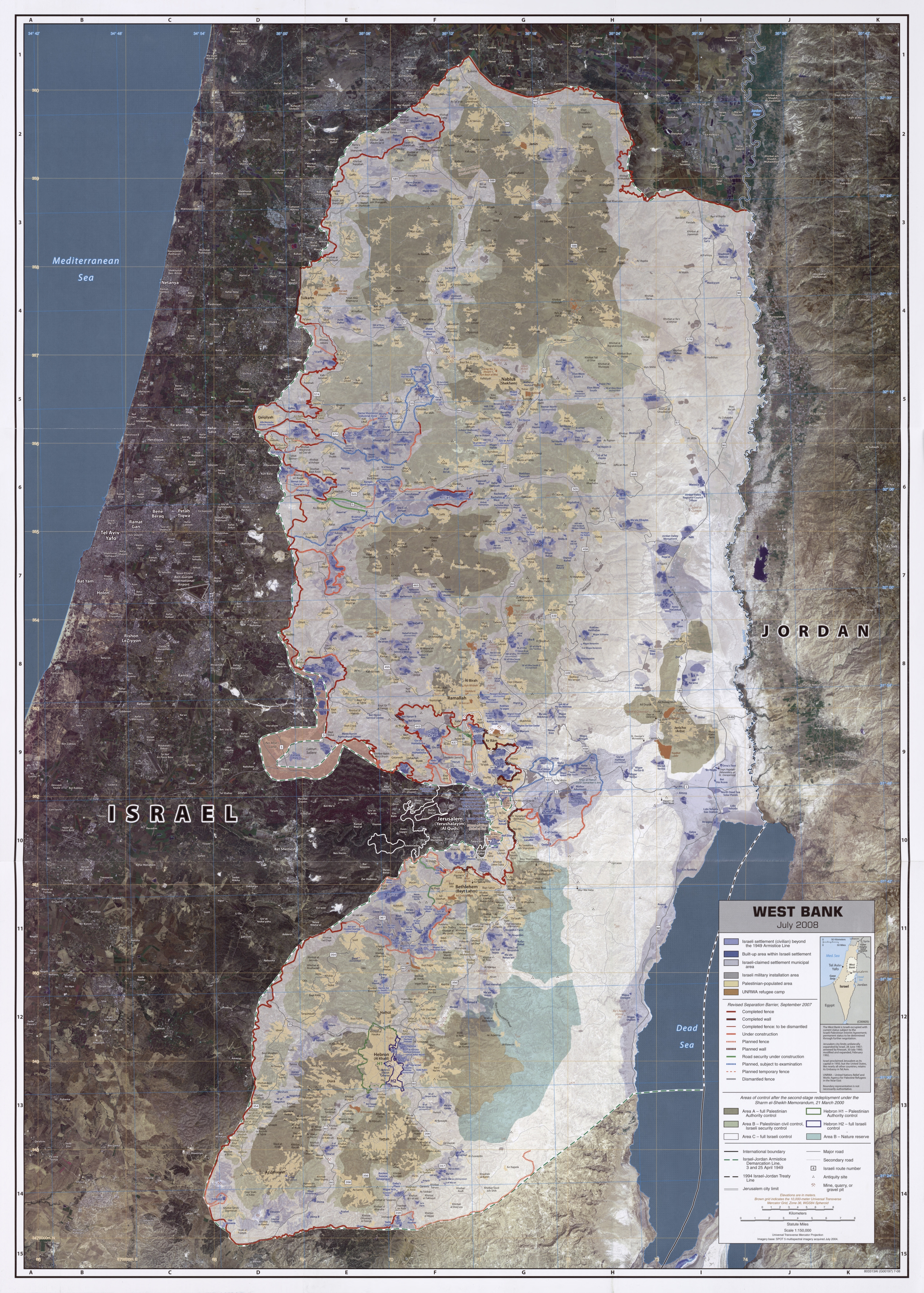
CIA remote-sensing map of areas governed by the Palestinian Authority, July 2008.

The Middle East Peace Summit at Camp David, from 11 to 25 July 2000, took place between the United States President Bill Clinton, Israeli Prime Minister Ehud Barak, and Palestinian Authority Chairman Yasser Arafat. It failed with the latter two blaming each other for the failure of the talks. There were four principal obstacles to agreement: territory, Jerusalem and the Temple Mount, Palestinian refugees and the right of return, and Israeli security concerns.

==== Ariel Sharon visits the Temple Mount ====
On 28 September, Israeli opposition leader Ariel Sharon and a Likud party delegation guarded by hundreds of Israeli riot police visited the Temple Mount, which is widely considered the third holiest site in Islam. Israel has claimed sovereignty over the Mount and the rest of East Jerusalem since 1980, and the compound is the holiest site in Judaism.

The Israeli Interior Minister Shlomo Ben-Ami, who permitted Sharon's visit, later claimed that he had telephoned the Palestinian Authority's security chief Jibril Rajoub before the visit and gotten his reassurances that as long as Sharon didn't enter the mosques his visit wouldn't cause any problems. Rajoub vociferously denied having given any such reassurances.

Shortly after Sharon left the site, angry demonstrations by Palestinian Jerusalemites outside erupted into rioting. The person in charge of the waqf at the time, Abu Qteish, was later indicted by Israel for using a loud-speaker to call on Palestinians to defend Al-Aqsa, which action Israeli authorities claimed was responsible for the subsequent stone-throwing in the direction of the Wailing Wall. Israeli police responded with tear gas and rubber bullets, while protesters hurled stones and other projectiles, injuring 25 policemen, of whom one was seriously injured and had to be taken to hospital. At least three Palestinians were wounded by rubber bullets.

The stated purpose for Sharon's visit of the compound was to assert the right of all Israelis to visit the Temple Mount; however, according to Likud spokesman Ofir Akunis, the actual purpose was to "show that under a Likud government [the Temple Mount] will remain under Israeli sovereignty." Ehud Barak in the Camp David negotiations had insisted that East Jerusalem, where the Haram was located, would remain under complete Israeli sovereignty. In response to accusations by Ariel Sharon of government readiness to concede the site to the Palestinians, the Israeli government gave Sharon permission to visit the area. When alerted of his intentions, senior Palestinian figures, such as Yasser Arafat, Saeb Erekat, and Faisal Husseini, all asked Sharon to call off his visit.

Ten days earlier the Palestinians had observed their annual memorial day for the Sabra and Shatila massacre, where thousands of Lebanese and Palestinian Muslims were massacred by Lebanese Forces supported by the Israeli military. The Israeli Kahan Commission had concluded that Ariel Sharon, who was the Israeli Defense Minister during the Sabra and Shatila massacre, was found to bear personal responsibility "for ignoring the danger of bloodshed and revenge" and "not taking appropriate measures to prevent bloodshed." Sharon's negligence in protecting the civilian population of Beirut, which had come under Israeli control, amounted to a non-fulfillment of a duty with which the Defence Minister was charged, and it was recommended that Sharon be dismissed as Defence Minister. Sharon initially refused to resign, but after the death of an Israeli after a peace march, Sharon did resign as Defense minister, but remained in the Israeli cabinet.

The Palestinians condemned Sharon's visit to the Temple Mount as a provocation and an incursion, as were his armed bodyguards that arrived on the scene with him. Critics claim that Sharon knew that the visit could trigger violence, and that the purpose of his visit was political. According to one observer, Sharon, in walking on the Temple Mount, was "skating on the thinnest ice in the Arab-Israeli conflict."

According to The New York Times, many in the Arab world, including Egyptians, Palestinians, Lebanese and Jordanians, point to Sharon's visit as the beginning of the Second Intifada and derailment of the peace process. According to Juliana Ochs, Sharon's visit 'symbolically instigated' the second intifada. Marwan Barghouti said that although Sharon's provocative actions were a rallying point for Palestinians, the Second Intifada would have erupted even had he not visited the Temple Mount.

==== Post-visit Palestinian riots ====
On 29 September 2000, the day after Sharon's visit, following Friday prayers, large riots broke out around the Old City of Jerusalem. Israeli police fired at Palestinians at the Temple Mount throwing stones over the Western Wall at Jewish worshippers. After the chief of Jerusalem's police force was knocked unconscious by a stone, they switched to live ammunition and killed four Palestinian youths. Up to 200 Palestinians and police were injured. Another three Palestinians were killed in the Old City and on the Mount of Olives. By the end of the day, seven Palestinians had been killed and 300 had been wounded; 70 Israeli policemen were also injured in the clashes.

In the days that followed, demonstrations erupted all over the West Bank and Gaza. Israeli police responded with live fire and rubber-coated bullets. In the first five days, at least 47 Palestinians were killed, and 1,885 were wounded. In Paris, as Jacques Chirac attempted to mediate between the parties, he protested to Barak that the ratio of Palestinians and Israelis killed and wounded on one day were such that he could not convince anyone the Palestinians were the aggressors. He also told Barak that "continu(ing) to fire from helicopters on people throwing rocks" and refusing an international inquiry was tantamount to rejecting Arafat's offer to participate in trilateral negotiations. During the first few days of riots, the IDF fired approximately 1.3 million bullets.

According to Amnesty International the early Palestinian casualties were those taking part in demonstrations or bystanders. Amnesty further states that approximately 80% of the Palestinians killed during the first month were in demonstrations where Israeli security services lives were not in danger.

On 30 September 2000, the death of Muhammad al-Durrah, a Palestinian boy shot dead while sheltering behind his father in an alley in the Gaza Strip, was caught on video. Initially the boy's death and his father's wounding was attributed to Israeli soldiers. The scene assumed iconic status, as it was shown around the world and repeatedly broadcast on Arab television. The Israeli army initially assumed responsibility for the killing and apologised, and only retracted 2 months later, when an internal investigation cast doubt on the original version, and controversy subsequently raged as to whether indeed the IDF had fired the shots or Palestinian factions were responsible for the fatal gunshots.

==== October 2000 events ====
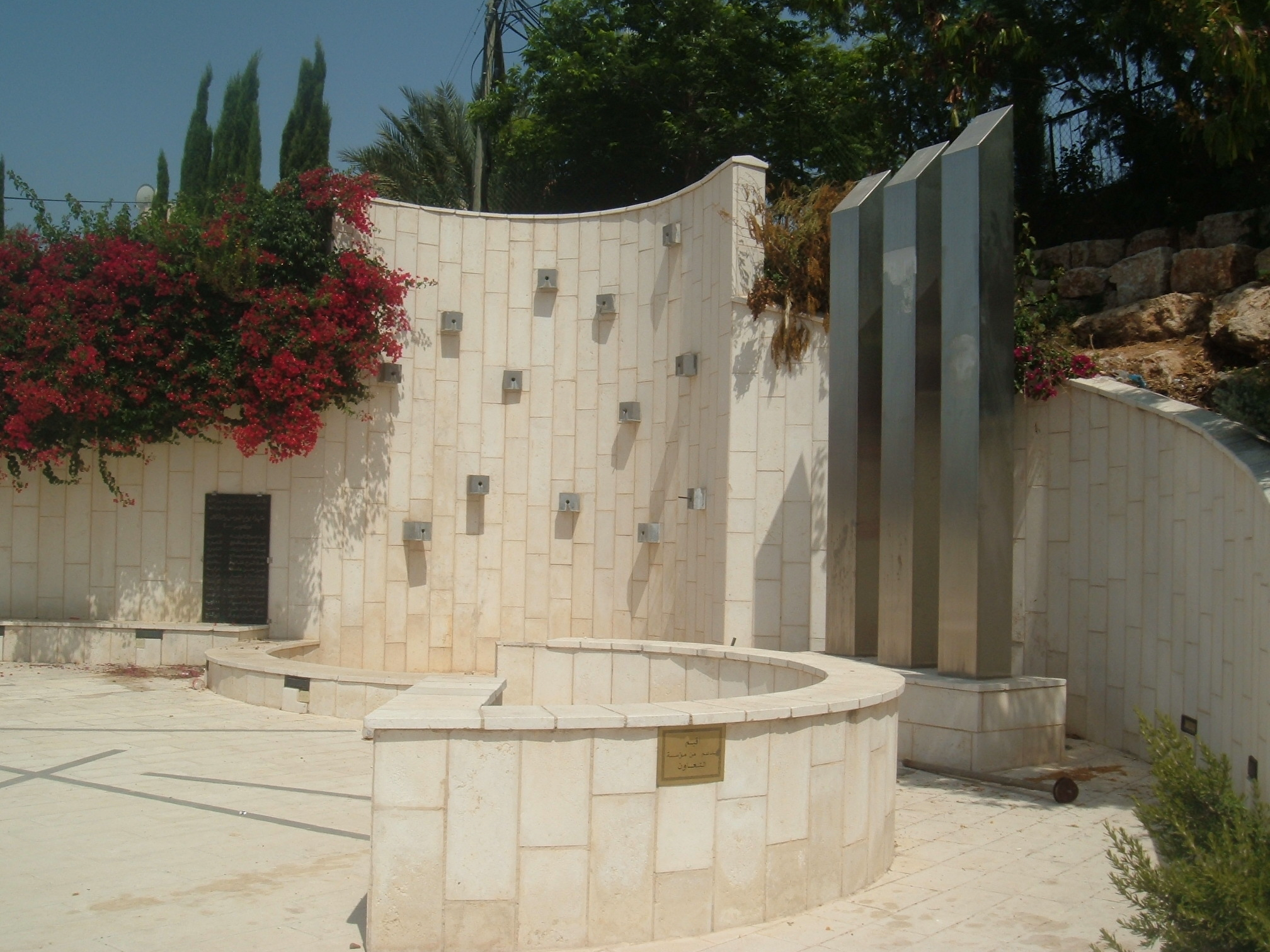
Monument to Israeli Arab casualties in October 2000 riots, Nazareth

The "October 2000 events" refers to several days of disturbances and clashes within Israel, mostly between Arab citizens and the Israel police, as well as large-scale rioting by both Arabs and Jews. Twelve Arab citizens of Israel and a Palestinian from the Gaza Strip were killed by Israeli police, while an Israeli Jew was killed when his car was hit by a rock on the Tel-Aviv-Haifa freeway. During the first month of the Intifada, 141 Palestinians were killed and 5,984 were wounded, while 12 Israelis were killed and 65 wounded.

A general strike and demonstrations across northern Israel began on 1 October and continued for several days. In some cases, the demonstrations escalated into clashes with the Israeli police involving rock-throwing, firebombing, and live-fire. Policemen used tear-gas and opened fire with rubber-coated bullets and later live ammunition in some instances, many times in contravention of police protocol governing riot-dispersion. This use of live ammunition was directly linked with many of the deaths by the Or Commission.

On 8 October, thousands of Jewish Israelis participated in violent acts in Tel Aviv and elsewhere, some throwing stones at Arabs, destroying Arab property and chanting "Death to the Arabs."

Following the riots, a high degree of tension between Jewish and Arab citizens and distrust between the Arab citizens and police were widespread. An investigation committee, headed by Supreme Court Justice Theodor Or, reviewed the violent riots and found that the police were poorly prepared to handle such riots and charged major officers with bad conduct. The Or Commission reprimanded Prime Minister Ehud Barak and recommended Shlomo Ben-Ami, then the Internal Security Minister, not serve again as Minister of Public Security. The committee also blamed Arab leaders and Knesset members for contributing to inflaming the atmosphere and making the violence more severe.

==== Ramallah lynching and Israeli response ====
On 12 October, PA police arrested two Israeli reservists who had accidentally entered Ramallah, where in the preceding weeks a hundred Palestinians had been killed, nearly two dozen of them minors. Rumours quickly spread that Israeli undercover agents were in the building, and an angry crowd of more than 1,000 Palestinians gathered in front of the station calling for their death. Both soldiers were beaten, stabbed, and disembowelled, and one body was set on fire. An Italian television crew captured the killings on video and then broadcast the tape internationally. A British journalist had his camera destroyed by rioters as he attempted to take a picture. The brutality of the killings shocked the Israeli public, who saw it as proof of a deep-seated Palestinian hatred of Israel and Jews. In response, Israel launched a series of retaliatory air-strikes against Palestinian Authority targets in the West Bank and Gaza Strip. The police station where the lynching had taken place was evacuated and destroyed in these operations. Israel later tracked down and arrested those responsible for killing the soldiers.

==== November–December 2000 ====
Clashes between Israeli forces and Palestinians increased sharply on 1 November, when three Israeli soldiers and six Palestinians were killed, and four IDF soldiers and 140 Palestinians were wounded. In subsequent days, casualties increased as the IDF attempted to restore order, with clashes occurring every day in November. A total of 122 Palestinians and 22 Israelis were killed. On 27 November, the first day of Ramadan, Israel eased restrictions on the passage of goods and fuel through the Karni crossing. That same day, the Jerusalem settlement of Gilo came under Palestinian heavy machine gun fire from Beit Jala. Israel tightened restrictions a week later, and Palestinians continued to clash with the IDF and Israeli settlers, with a total of 51 Palestinians and 8 Israelis killed in December. In a last attempt by the Clinton administration to achieve a peace deal between Israelis and Palestinians, a summit was planned in Sharm el-Sheikh in December. However, Israeli Prime Minister Barak decided not to attend after the Palestinians delayed their acceptance of the Clinton Parameters.

=== 2001 ===
The Taba Summit between Israel and the Palestinian Authority was held from 21 to 27 January 2001, at Taba in the Sinai peninsula. Israeli prime minister Ehud Barak and Palestinian President Yasser Arafat came closer to reaching a final settlement than any previous or subsequent peace talks yet ultimately failed to achieve their goals.

On 17 January 2001, Israeli teenager Ofir Rahum was murdered after being lured into Ramallah by a 24-year-old Palestinian, Mona Jaud Awana, a member of Fatah's Tanzim. She had contacted Ofir on the internet and engaged in an online romance with him for several months. She eventually convinced him to drive to Ramallah to meet her, where he was instead ambushed by three Palestinian gunmen and shot over fifteen times. Awana was later arrested in a massive military and police operation, and imprisoned for life. Five other Israelis were killed in January, along with eighteen Palestinians.

Ariel Sharon, at the time from the Likud party, ran against Ehud Barak from the Labor party. Sharon was elected Israeli Prime Minister 6 February 2001 in the 2001 special election to the Prime Ministership. Sharon refused to meet in person with Yasser Arafat.

Violence in March resulted in the deaths of 8 Israelis, mostly civilians, and 26 Palestinians. In Hebron, a Palestinian sniper killed ten-month-old Israeli baby Shalhevet Pass. The murder shocked the Israeli public. According to the Israel police investigation the sniper aimed deliberately at the baby.

On 30 April 2001, seven Palestinian militants were killed in an explosion, one of them a participant in Ofir Rahum's murder. The IDF refused to confirm or deny Palestinian accusations that it was responsible.

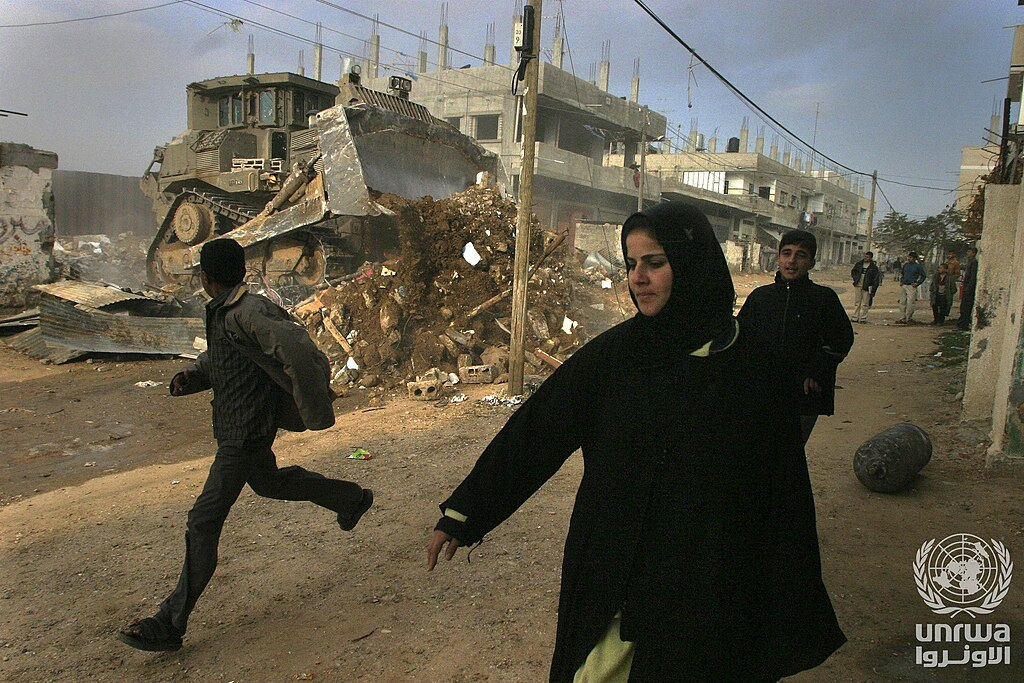
Israeli armoured bulldozer demolishing a Palestinian house in Gaza city, 2001

On 7 May 2001, IDF naval commandos captured the vessel Santorini, which was sailing in international waters towards Palestinian Authority-controlled Gaza. The ship was laden with weaponry. The Israeli investigation that followed said that the shipment had been purchased by Ahmed Jibril's Popular Front for the Liberation of Palestine - General Command (PFLP-GC). The ship's value and that of its cargo was estimated at $10 million. The crew was reportedly planning to unload the cargo of weapons-filled barrels—carefully sealed and waterproofed along with their contents—at a prearranged location off the Gaza coast, where the Palestinian Authority would recover it.

On 8 May 2001, two Israeli teenagers, Yaakov "Koby" Mandell (13) and Yosef Ishran (14), were kidnapped while hiking near their village. Their bodies were discovered the next morning in a cave near where they lived. USA Today reported that, according to the police, both boys had "been bound, stabbed and beaten to death with rocks." The newspaper continued, "The walls of the cave in the Judean Desert were covered with the boys' blood, reportedly smeared there by the killers."

After a suicide bombing struck Netanya on 18 May 2001, Israel for the first time since 1967 used warplanes to attack Palestinian Authority targets in the West Bank and Gaza, killing 12 Palestinians. In the past, airstrikes had been carried out with helicopter gunships.

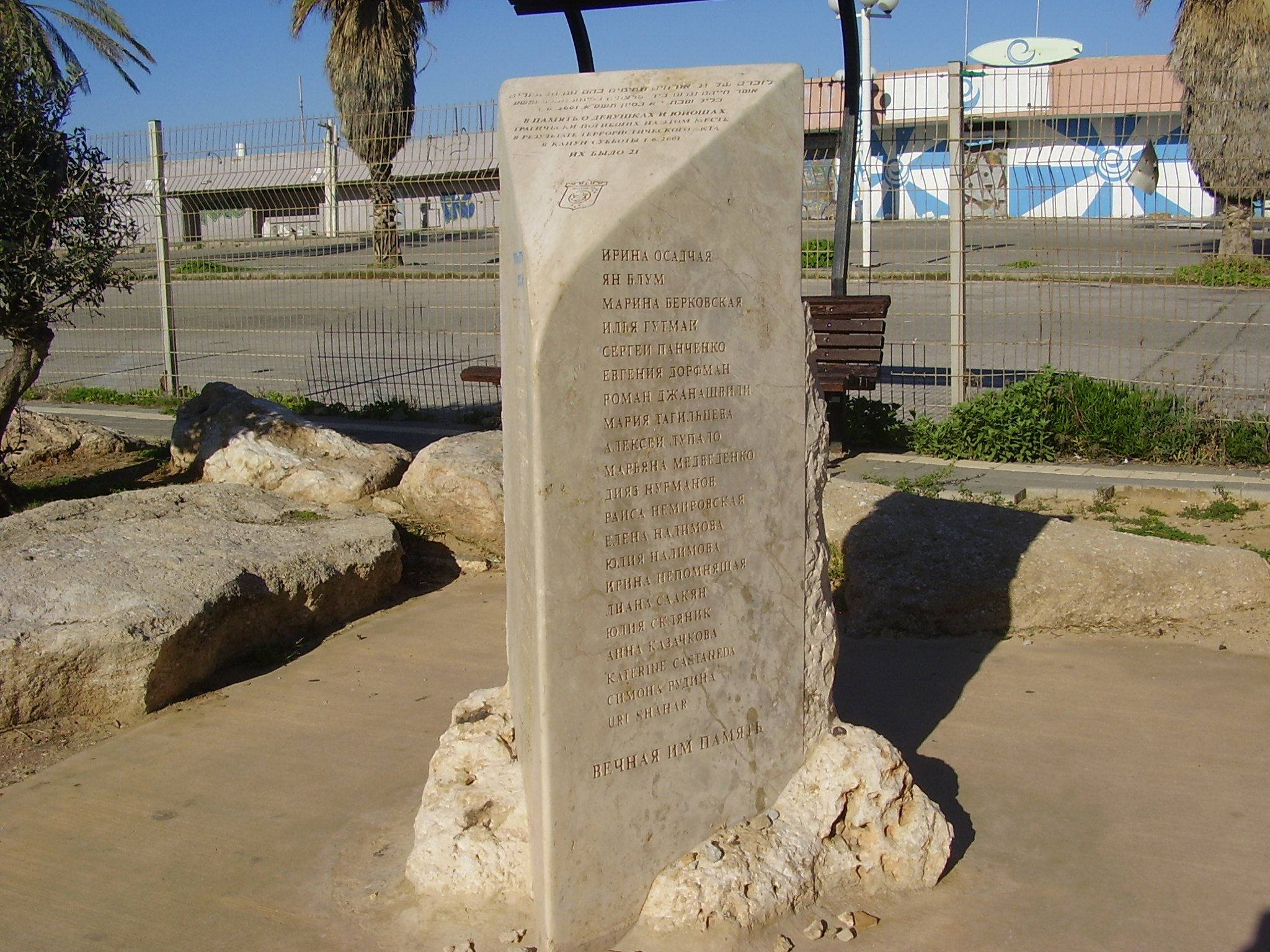
Dolphinarium Massacre memorial at the Tel Aviv Dolphinarium site with the names of the victims written in Russian

On 1 June 2001, an Islamic Jihad suicide bomber detonated himself in the Tel Aviv coastline Dolphinarium dancing club. Twenty-one Israeli civilians, most of them high school students, were killed and 132 injured. The attack significantly hampered American attempts to negotiate a cease-fire.

The 12 June Murder of Georgios Tsibouktzakis by Palestinian snipers was later tied to Marwan Barghouti.

A total of 469 Palestinians and 199 Israelis were killed in 2001. Amnesty International's report on the first year of the Intifada states:

The overwhelming majority of cases of unlawful killings and injuries in Israel and the Occupied Territories have been committed by the IDF using excessive force. In particular, the IDF have used US-supplied helicopters in punitive rocket attacks where there was no imminent danger to life. Israel has also used helicopter gunships to carry out extrajudicial executions and to fire at targets that resulted in the killing of civilians, including children. ... Hamas and Islamic Jihad have frequently placed bombs in public places, usually within Israel, in order to kill and maim large numbers of Israeli civilians in a random manner. Both organizations have fostered a cult of martyrdom and frequently use suicide bombers.

Palestinian terrorists committed a number of suicide attacks later in 2001, among them the Sbarro restaurant massacre, with 15 civilian casualties (including 7 children); the Nahariya train station suicide bombing and the Pardes Hanna bus bombing, both with 3 civilian casualties; the Ben Yehuda Street bombing with 11 civilian deaths, many of them children; and the Haifa bus 16 suicide bombing, with 15 civilian casualties.

=== 2002 ===
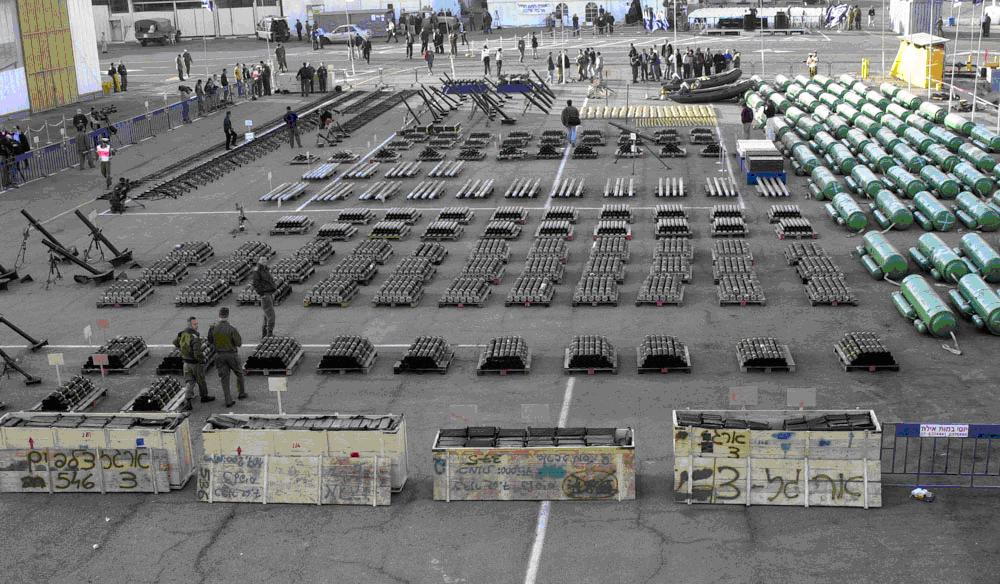
Military equipment confiscated from Karine A

In January 2002, the IDF Shayetet 13 naval commandos captured the Karine A, a freighter carrying weapons from Iran towards Israel, believed to be intended for Palestinian militant use against Israel. It was discovered that top officials in the Palestinian Authority were involved in the smuggling, with the Israelis pointing the finger towards Yasser Arafat as also being involved.

Palestinians launched a spate of suicide bombings and attacks against Israel, aimed mostly at civilians. On 3 March, a Palestinian sniper killed 10 Israeli soldiers and civilians and wounded 4 at a checkpoint near Ofra using an M1 Garand. He was later arrested and sentenced to life imprisonment. The rate of the attacks increased, and was at its highest in March 2002.

In addition to numerous shooting and grenade attacks, the month saw 15 suicide bombings carried out in Israel — an average of one bombing every two days. The high rate of attacks caused widespread fear throughout Israel and serious disruption of daily life throughout the country. March 2002 became known in Israel as "Black March". On 12 March United Nations Security Council Resolution 1397 was passed, which reaffirmed a Two-state solution and laid the groundwork for a Road map for peace.

On 27 March, the wave of violence culminated with a suicide bombing during a Passover celebration at the Park Hotel in Netanya in which 30 people were killed. The attack became known as the Passover massacre. In total, around 130 Israelis, mostly civilians, were killed in Palestinian attacks during March 2002. On 28 March, Arab leaders, whose constituencies were exposed to detailed television coverage of the violence in the conflict, set out a comprehensive Arab Peace Initiative that was endorsed by Arafat, but virtually ignored by Israel.

On 29 March, Israel launched Operation Defensive Shield, which lasted until 3 May. The IDF made sweeping incursions throughout the West Bank, and into numerous Palestinian cities. Arafat was put under siege in his Ramallah compound. The UN estimated that 497 Palestinians were killed and 1,447 wounded by the Israeli incursion from 1 March to 7 May. A UN report cleared Israel of allegations of massacre, but criticized it for using excessive force on the civilian population. Israeli forces also arrested 4,258 Palestinians during the operation. Israeli casualties during the operation totaled 30 dead and 127 wounded. The operation culminated with the recapturing of Palestinian Authority controlled areas.

==== Battle of Jenin ====
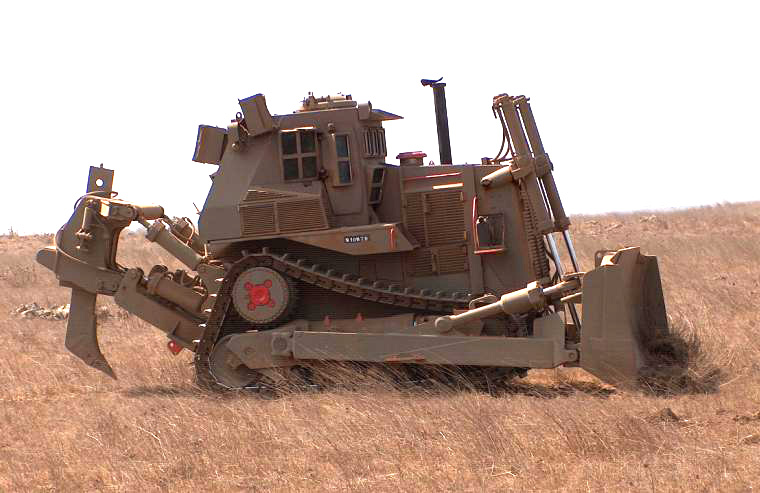
IDF Caterpillar D9 armored bulldozer

Between 2 and 11 April, a siege and fierce fighting took place in the Palestinian refugee camp of the city of Jenin. The camp was targeted during Operation Defensive Shield after Israel determined that it had "served as a launch site for numerous terrorist attacks against both Israeli civilians and Israeli towns and villages in the area." The Jenin battle became a flashpoint for both sides, and saw fierce urban combat as Israeli infantry supported by armor and attack helicopters fought to clear the camp of Palestinian militants. The battle was eventually won by the IDF, after it employed a dozen Caterpillar D9 armored bulldozers to clear Palestinian booby traps, detonate explosive charges, and raze buildings and gun-posts; the bulldozers proved impervious to attacks by Palestinian militants.

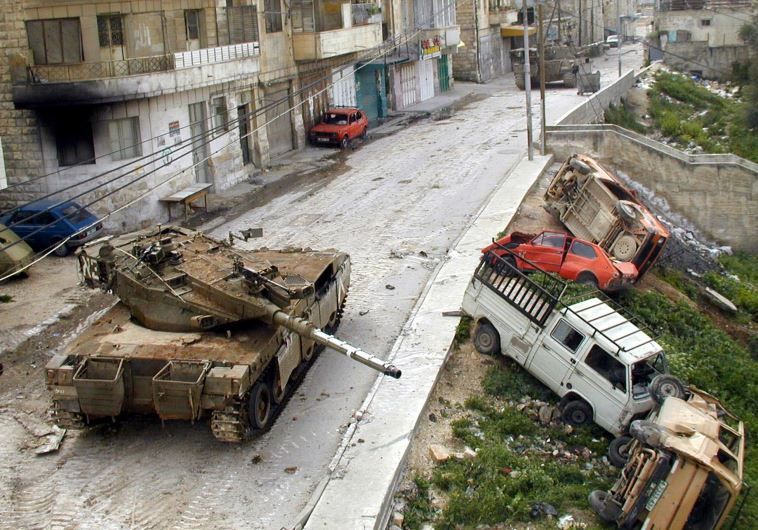
Israeli tanks in the streets of the Palestinian refugee camp of Jenin, April 2002.

During Israeli military operations in the camp, Palestinian sources alleged that a massacre of hundreds of people had taken place. A senior Palestinian Authority official said in mid-April that some 500 had been killed. During the fighting in Jenin, Israeli officials had also initially estimated hundreds of Palestinian deaths, but later said they expected the Palestinian toll to reach "45 to 55." In the ensuing controversy, Israel blocked the United Nations from conducting the first-hand inquiry unanimously sought by the Security Council, but the UN nonetheless felt able to dismiss claims of a massacre in its report, which said there had been approximately 52 deaths, criticising both sides for placing Palestinian civilians at risk. Based on their own investigations, Amnesty International and Human Rights Watch charged that some IDF personnel in Jenin had committed war crimes but also confirmed that no massacre had been committed by the IDF. Both human rights organizations called for official inquiries; the IDF disputed the charges.

After the battle, most sources, including the IDF and Palestinian Authority, placed the Palestinian death toll at 52–56; Human Rights Watch documented 52 Palestinian deaths and claimed that it included at least 27 militants and 22 civilians, and an additional 3 Palestinians whose status as militants or civilians could not be ascertained, while the IDF said that 48 militants and 5 civilians had been killed. According to Human Rights Watch, 140 buildings had been destroyed. The IDF reported that 23 Israeli soldiers had been killed and 75 wounded during the battle.

==== Siege in Bethlehem ====
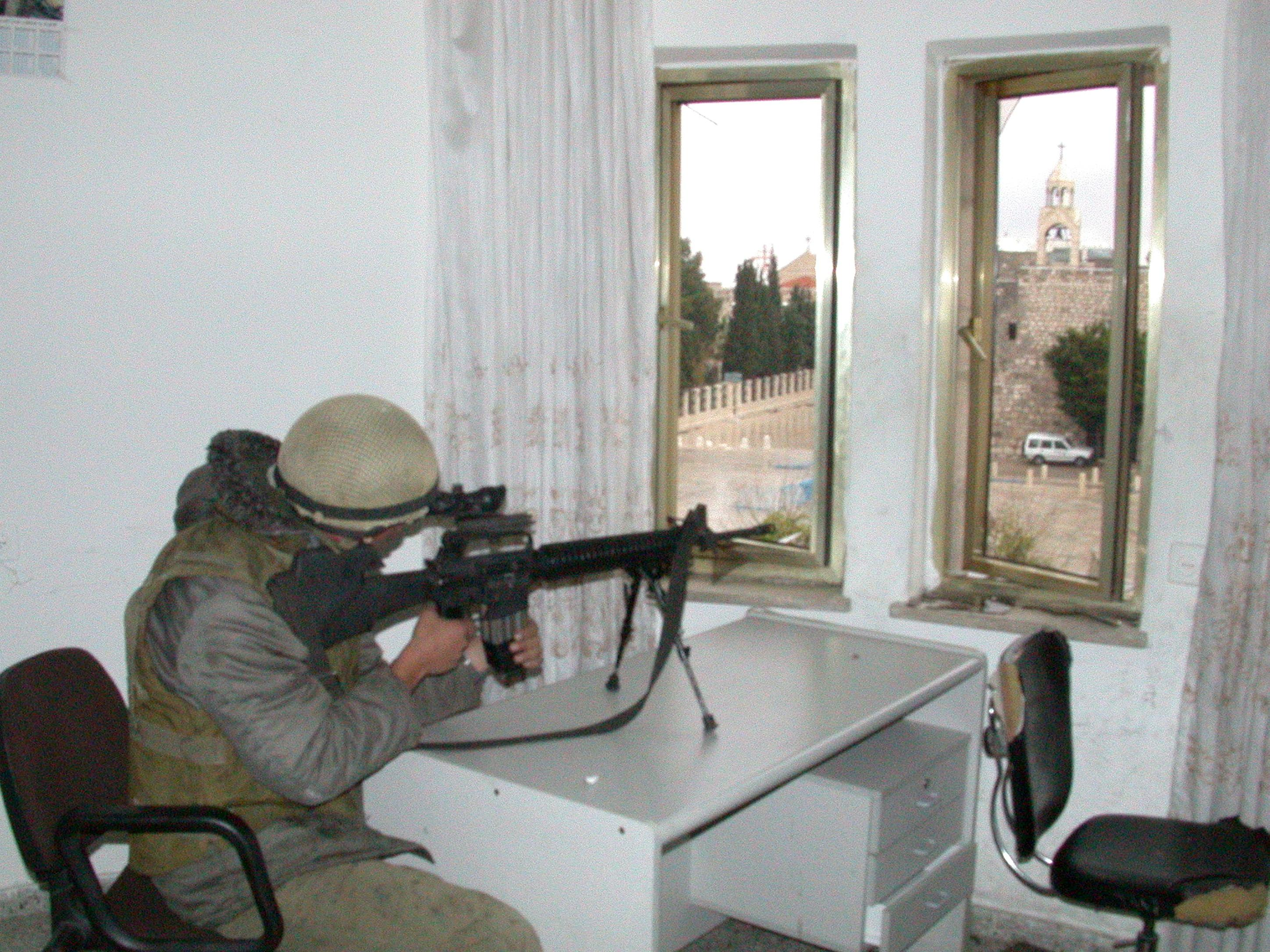
Israeli sniper during the siege of the Church of the Nativity in Bethlehem, April 3, 2002

From 2 April to 10 May, a stand-off developed at the Church of the Nativity in Bethlehem. IDF soldiers surrounded the church while Palestinian civilians, militants, and priests were inside. During the siege, IDF snipers killed 8 militants inside the church and wounded more than 40 people. The stand-off was resolved by the deportation to Europe of 13 Palestinian militants whom the IDF had identified as terrorists, and the IDF ended its 38-day stand-off with the militants inside the church.

=== 2003 ===
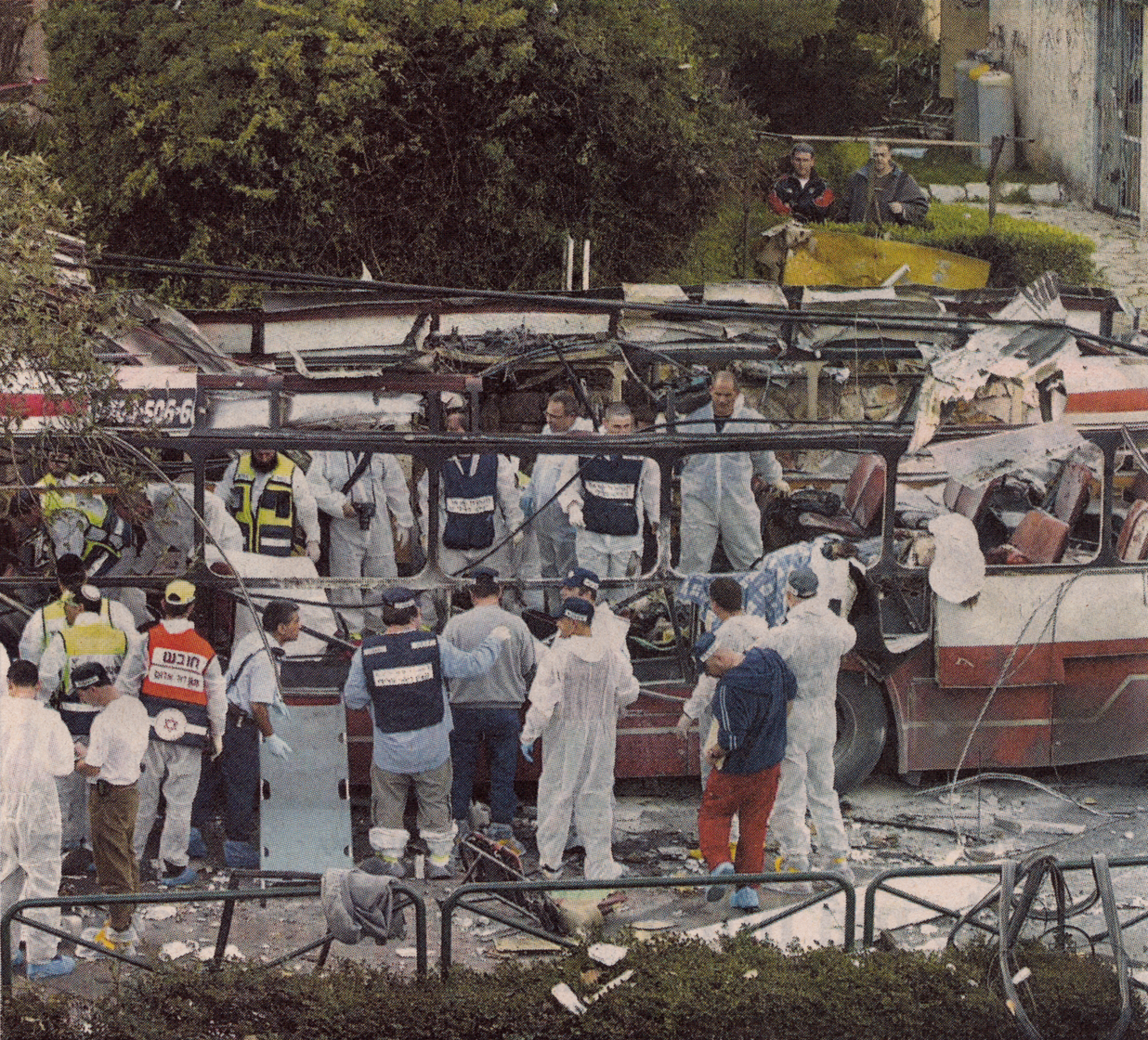
The aftermath of a bus bombing in Haifa in 2003

Following an Israeli intelligence report stating that Yasir Arafat had paid $20,000 to al-Aqsa Martyrs' Brigades, the United States demanded democratic reforms in the Palestinian Authority, as well the appointment of a prime minister independent of Arafat. On 13 March 2003, following U.S. pressure, Arafat appointed Mahmoud Abbas as Palestinian prime minister.

Following the appointment of Abbas, the U.S. administration promoted the Road map for peace—the Quartet's plan to end the Israeli–Palestinian conflict by disbanding militant organizations, halting settlement activity and establishing a democratic and peaceful Palestinian state. The first phase of the plan demanded that the Palestinian Authority suppress guerrilla and terrorist attacks and confiscate illegal weapons. Unable or unwilling to confront militant organizations and risk civil war, Abbas tried to reach a temporary cease-fire agreement with the militant factions and asked them to halt attacks on Israeli civilians.

On 20 May, Israeli naval commandos intercepted another vessel, the Abu Hassan, on course to the Gaza Strip from Lebanon. It was loaded with rockets, weapons, and ammunition. Eight crew members on board were arrested including a senior Hezbollah member.

On 29 June 2003, a temporary armistice was unilaterally declared by Fatah, Hamas and Islamic Jihad, which declared a ceasefire and halt to all attacks against Israel for a period of three months. Violence decreased somewhat in the following month, but suicide bombings against Israeli civilians continued as well as Israeli operations against militants.

Four Palestinians, three of them militants, were killed in gun battles during an IDF raid of Askar near Nablus involving tanks and armoured personnel carriers (APCs); an Israeli soldier was killed by one of the militants. Nearby Palestinians claimed a squad of Israeli police disguised as Palestinian labourers opened fire on Abbedullah Qawasameh as he left a Hebron mosque. YAMAM, the Israeli counter-terrorism police unit that performed the operation, said Qawasemah opened fire on them as they attempted to arrest him.

On 19 August, Hamas coordinated a suicide attack on a crowded bus in Jerusalem killing 23 Israeli civilians, including 7 children. Hamas claimed it was a retaliation for the killing of five Palestinians (including Hamas leader Abbedullah Qawasameh) earlier in the week. U.S. and Israeli media outlets frequently referred to the bus bombing as shattering the quiet and bringing an end to the ceasefire.

Following the Hamas bus attack, Israeli Defence Forces were ordered to kill or capture all Hamas leaders in Hebron and the Gaza Strip. The plotters of the bus suicide bombing were all captured or killed and Hamas leadership in Hebron was badly damaged by the IDF. Strict curfews were enforced in Nablus, Jenin, and Tulkarem; the Nablus lockdown lasted for over 100 days. In Nazlet 'Issa, over 60 shops were destroyed by Israeli civil administration bulldozers. The Israeli civil administration explained that the shops were demolished because they were built without a permit. Palestinians consider Israeli military curfews and property destruction to constitute collective punishment against innocent Palestinians.

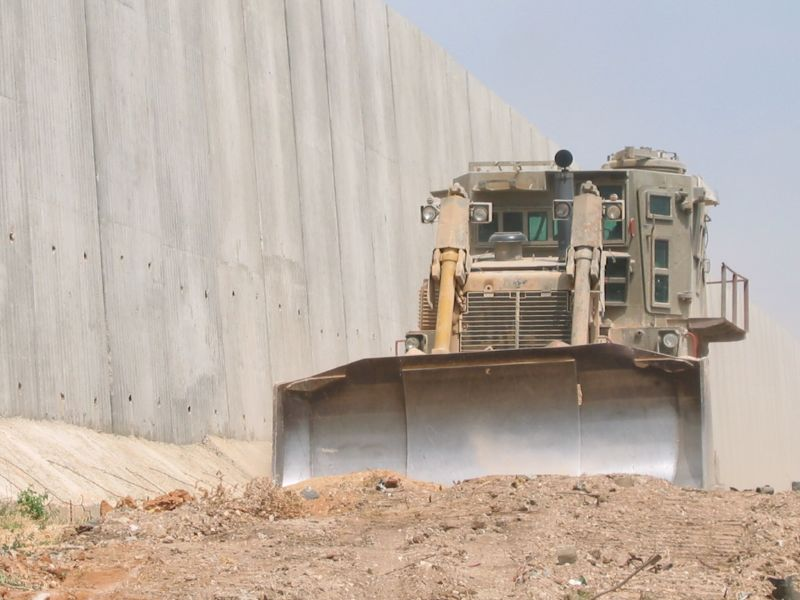
Early Israeli construction of West Bank barrier, 2003

Unable to rule effectively under Arafat, Abbas resigned in September 2003. Ahmed Qurei (Abu Ala) was appointed to replace him. The Israeli government gave up hope for negotiated settlement to the conflict and pursued a unilateral policy of physically separating Israel from Palestinian communities by beginning construction on the Israeli West Bank barrier. Israel claims the barrier is necessary to prevent Palestinian attackers from entering Israeli cities. Palestinians claim the barrier separates Palestinian communities from each other and that the construction plan is a de facto annexation of Palestinian territory.

Following a 4 October suicide bombing in Maxim restaurant, Haifa, which claimed the lives of 21 Israelis, Israel claimed that Syria and Iran sponsored the Islamic Jihad and Hezbollah, and were responsible for the terrorist attack. The day after the Maxim massacre, IAF warplanes bombed an alleged former Palestinian training base at Ain Saheb, Syria, which had been mostly abandoned since the 1980s. Munitions being stored on the site were destroyed, and a civilian guard was injured.

=== 2004 ===
In response to repeated shelling of Israeli communities with Qassam rockets and mortar shells from Gaza, the IDF operated mainly in Rafah – to search and destroy smuggling tunnels used by militants to obtain weapons, ammunition, fugitives, cigarettes, car parts, electrical goods, foreign currency, gold, drugs, and cloth from Egypt. Between September 2000 and May 2004, ninety tunnels connecting Egypt and the Gaza Strip were found and destroyed. Raids in Rafah left many families homeless. Israel's official stance is that their houses were captured by militants and were destroyed during battles with IDF forces. Many of these houses are abandoned due to Israeli incursions and later destroyed. According to Human Rights Watch, over 1,500 houses were destroyed to create a large buffer zone in the city, many "in the absence of military necessity", displacing around sixteen thousand people.

On 2 February 2004, Israeli Prime Minister Ariel Sharon announced his plan to transfer all the Jewish settlers from the Gaza Strip. The Israeli opposition dismissed his announcement as "media spin", but the Israeli Labour Party said it would support such a move. Sharon's right-wing coalition partners National Religious Party and National Union rejected the plan and vowed to quit the government if it were implemented. Yossi Beilin, peace advocate and architect of the Oslo Accords and the Geneva Accord, also rejected the proposed withdrawal plan. He claimed that withdrawing from the Gaza Strip without a peace agreement would reward terror.

Following the declaration of the disengagement plan by Ariel Sharon and as a response to suicide attacks on Erez crossing and Ashdod seaport (10 people were killed), the IDF launched a series of armored raids on the Gaza Strip (mainly Rafah and refugee camps around Gaza), killing about 70 Hamas militants. On 22 March 2004, an Israeli helicopter gunship killed Hamas leader Sheikh Ahmed Yassin, along with his two bodyguards and nine bystanders. On 17 April, after several failed attempts by Hamas to commit suicide bombings and a successful one that killed an Israeli policeman, Yassin's successor, Abdel Aziz al-Rantissi, was killed in an almost identical way, along with a bodyguard and his son Mohammed.

The fighting in Gaza Strip escalated severely in May 2004 after several failed attempts to attack Israeli checkpoints such as Erez crossing and Karni crossing. On 2 May, Palestinian militants attacked and shot dead a pregnant woman and her four young daughters. Amnesty International classified it as a crime against humanity and said it "reiterates its call on all Palestinian armed groups to put an immediate end to the deliberate targeting of Israeli civilians, in Israel and in the Occupied Territories". Additionally, on 11 and 12 May, Palestinian militants destroyed two IDF M-113 APCs, killing 13 soldiers and mutilating their bodies. The IDF launched two raids to recover the bodies, killing 20–40 Palestinians and greatly damaging structures in the Zaitoun neighbourhood in Gaza and in south-west Rafah.

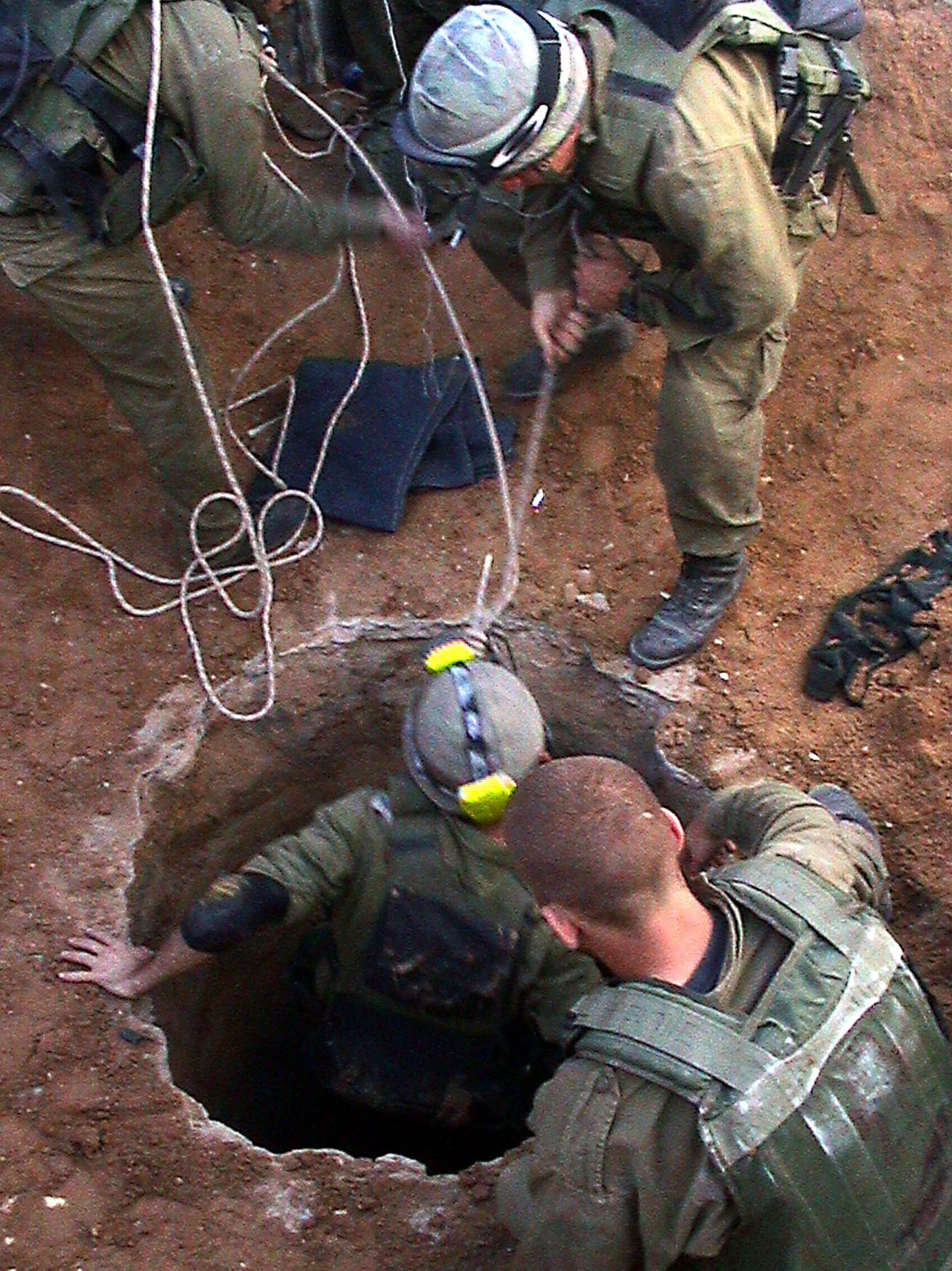
Israeli forces uncover a smuggling tunnel in Gaza, May 2004

Subsequently, on 18 May the IDF launched Operation Rainbow with a stated aim of striking the militant infrastructure of Rafah, destroying smuggling tunnels, and stopping a shipment of SA-7 missiles and improved anti-tank weapons. A total of 41 Palestinian militants and 12 civilians were killed in the operation, and about 45–56 Palestinian structures were demolished. Israeli tanks shelled hundreds of Palestinian protesters approaching their positions, killing 10. The protesters had disregarded Israeli warnings to turn back. This incident led to a worldwide outcry against the operation.

On 29 September, after a Qassam rocket hit the Israeli town of Sderot and killed two Israeli children, the IDF launched Operation Days of Penitence in the north of the Gaza Strip. The operation's stated aim was to remove the threat of Qassam rockets from Sderot and kill the Hamas militants launching them. The operation ended on 16 October, after having caused widespread destruction and the deaths of over 100 Palestinians, at least 20 of whom were under the age of sixteen. The IDF killed thirteen-year-old Iman Darweesh Al Hams as she strayed into a closed military area; the commander was accused of allegedly firing his automatic weapon at her dead body deliberately to verify the death. The act was investigated by the IDF, but the commander was cleared of all wrongdoing, and more recently, was fully vindicated when a Jerusalem district court found the claim to be libellous, ruled that NIS 300,000 be paid by the journalist and TV company responsible for the report, an additional NIS 80,000 to be paid in legal fees and required the journalist and television company to air a correction. According to Palestinian medics, Israeli forces killed at least 62 militants and 42 other Palestinians believed to be civilians. According to a count performed by Haaretz, 87 militants and 42 civilians were killed. Palestinian refugee camps were heavily damaged by the Israeli assault. The IDF announced that at least 12 Qassam launchings had been thwarted and many militants hit during the operation.

On 21 October, the Israeli Air Force killed Adnan al-Ghoul, a senior Hamas bomb maker and the inventor of the Qassam rocket.

On 11 November, Yasser Arafat died in Paris.

Escalation in Gaza began amid the visit of Mahmoud Abbas to Syria in order to achieve a Hudna between Palestinian factions and convince Hamas leadership to halt attacks against Israelis. Hamas vowed to continue the armed struggle, sending numerous Qassam rockets into open fields near Nahal Oz, and hitting a kindergarten in Kfar Darom with an anti-tank missile.

On 9 December five Palestinians weapon smugglers were killed and two were arrested in the border between Rafah and Egypt. Later that day, Jamal Abu Samhadana and two of his bodyguards were injured by a missile strike. In the first Israeli airstrike against militants in weeks, an unmanned Israeli drone plane launched one missile at Abu Samahdna's car as it travelled between Rafah and Khan Younis in the southern Gaza Strip. It was the fourth attempt on Samhadana's life by Israel. Samhadana is one of two leaders of the Popular Resistance Committees and one of the main forces behind the smuggling tunnels. Samhadana is believed to be responsible for the blast against an American diplomatic convoy in Gaza that killed three Americans.

On 10 December, in response to Hamas firing mortar rounds into the Neveh Dekalim settlement in the Gaza Strip and wounding four Israelis (including an 8-year-old boy), Israeli soldiers fired at the Khan Younis refugee camp (the origin of the mortars) killing a seven-year-old girl. An IDF source confirmed troops opened fire at Khan Younis, but said they aimed at Hamas mortar crews.

The largest attack since the death of Yasser Arafat claimed the lives of five Israeli soldiers on 12 December, wounding ten others. Approximately 1.5 tons of explosives were detonated in a tunnel under an Israeli military-controlled border crossing on the Egyptian border with Gaza near Rafah, collapsing several structures and damaging others. The explosion destroyed part of the outpost and killed three soldiers. Two Palestinian militants then penetrated the outpost and killed two other Israeli soldiers with gunfire. It is believed that Hamas and a new Fatah faction, the "Fatah Hawks", conducted the highly organised and coordinated attack. A spokesman, "Abu Majad", claimed responsibility for the attack in the name of the Fatah Hawks claiming it was in retaliation for "the assassination" of Yasser Arafat, charging he was poisoned by Israel.

=== 2005 ===
Palestinian presidential elections were held on 9 January, and Mahmoud Abbas (Abu Mazen) was elected as the president of the PA. His platform was of a peaceful negotiation with Israel and non-violence to achieve Palestinian objectives. Although Abbas called on militants to halt attacks against Israel, he promised them protection from Israeli incursions and did not advocate disarmament by force.

Violence continued in the Gaza Strip, and Ariel Sharon froze all diplomatic and security contacts with the Palestinian National Authority. Spokesman Assaf Shariv declared that "Israel informed international leaders today that there will be no meetings with Abbas until he makes a real effort to stop the terror." The freezing of contacts came less than one week after Mahmoud Abbas was elected, and the day before his inauguration. Palestinian negotiator Saeb Erekat, confirming the news, declared "You cannot hold Mahmoud Abbas accountable when he hasn't even been inaugurated yet."

Gaza Strip, with borders and Israeli limited fishing zone

Following international pressure and Israeli threat of wide military operation in the Gaza Strip, Abbas ordered Palestinian police to deploy in the northern Gaza Strip to prevent Qassam rocket and mortar shelling over Israeli settlement. Although attacks on Israelis did not stop completely, they decreased sharply. On 8 February 2005, at the Sharm el-Sheikh Summit of 2005, Sharon and Abbas declared a mutual truce between Israel and the Palestinian National Authority. They shook hands at a four-way summit that also included Jordan and Egypt at Sharm al-Sheikh. However, Hamas and Islamic Jihad said the truce is not binding for their members. Israel has not withdrawn its demand to dismantle terrorist infrastructure before moving ahead in the Road map for peace.

Many warned that truce is fragile, and progress must be done slowly while observing that the truce and quiet are kept. On 9–10 February night, a barrage of 25–50 Qassam rockets and mortar shells hit Neve Dekalim settlement, and another barrage hit at noon. Hamas said it was in retaliation for an attack in which one Palestinian was killed near an Israeli settlement. As a response to the mortar attack, Abbas ordered the Palestinian security forces to stop such attacks in the future. He also fired senior commanders in the Palestinian security apparatus. On 10 February, Israeli security forces arrested Maharan Omar Shucat Abu Hamis, a Palestinian resident of Nablus, who was about to launch a bus suicide attack in the French Hill in Jerusalem.

On 13 February 2005, Abbas entered into talks with the leaders of the Islamic Jihad and the Hamas, for them to rally behind him and respect the truce. Ismail Haniyah, a senior leader of the group Hamas said that "its position regarding calm will continue unchanged and Israel will bear responsibility for any new violation or aggression."

In the middle of June, Palestinian factions intensified bombardment over the city of Sderot with improvised Qassam rockets. Palestinian attacks resulted in 2 Palestinians and 1 Chinese civilian killed by a Qassam, and 2 Israelis were killed. The wave of attacks lessened support for the disengagement plan among the Israeli public. Attacks on Israel by the Islamic Jihad and the al-Aqsa Martyrs' Brigades increased in July, and on 12 July, a suicide bombing hit the coastal city of Netanya, killing 5 civilians. On 14 July, Hamas started to shell Israeli settlements inside and outside the Gaza Strip with dozens of Qassam rockets, killing an Israeli woman. On 15 July, Israel resumed its "targeted killing" policy, killing 7 Hamas militants and bombing about 4 Hamas facilities. The continuation of shelling rockets over Israeli settlements, and street battles between Hamas militants and Palestinian policemen, threatened to shatter the truce agreed in the Sharm el-Sheikh Summit of 2005. The Israeli Defence Force also started to build up armored forces around the Gaza Strip in response to the shelling.

=== End of the Second Intifada ===
The ending date of the Second Intifada is disputed, as there was no definite event that brought it to an end. The general view is that it ended in 2005, while some sources include events and statistics extending as late as 2007.

- Some commentators, such as Sever Plocker, consider the intifada to have ended in late 2004. With the sickness and then death of Yasser Arafat in November 2004, the Palestinians lost their internationally recognised leader of the previous three decades, after which the intifada lost momentum and led to internal fighting between Palestinian factions (most notably the Fatah–Hamas conflict), as well as conflict within Fatah itself.
- Israel's unilateral disengagement from the Gaza Strip, announced in June 2004 and completed in August 2005, is also cited as signalling the end of the intifada, for instance by Ramzy Baroud.
- Some consider 8 February 2005 to be the official end of the Second Intifada, although sporadic violence still continued outside PA control or condonation. On that day, Abbas and Sharon met at the Sharm el-Sheikh Summit, where they vowed to end attacks on each other. In addition, Sharon agreed to release 900 Palestinian prisoners and withdraw from West Bank towns. Hamas and Palestinian Islamic Jihad (PIJ) refused to be parties to the agreement, arguing the cease-fire was the position of the PA only. Five days later Abbas reached agreement with the two dissenting organizations to commit to the truce with the proviso that Israeli violation would be met with retaliation.

Schachter addressed the difficulties in deciding when the Second Intifada ended. He reasoned that suicide bombing was the best criterion, being arguably the most important element of the violence involved, and that according to this criterion the intifada ended during 2005.

== Trigger for the uprising ==
The Second Intifada started on 28 September 2000, after Ariel Sharon, a Likud party candidate for Israeli Prime Minister, made a visit to the Temple Mount, also known as Al-Haram Al-Sharif, an area sacred to both Jews and Muslims, accompanied by over 1,000 security guards. He stated on that day, "the Temple Mount is in our hands and will remain in our hands. It is the holiest site in Judaism and it is the right of every Jew to visit the Temple Mount."

This visit was seen by Palestinians as highly provocative; and Palestinian demonstrators, throwing stones at police, were dispersed by the Israeli Army, using tear gas and rubber bullets. A riot broke out among Palestinians at the site, resulting in clashes between Israeli forces and the protesting crowd.

Some believe the Intifada started the next day, on Friday, 29 September, a day of prayers, when an Israeli police and military presence was introduced and there were major clashes and deaths.

=== The Mitchell Report ===
The Sharm el-Sheikh Fact-Finding Committee (an investigatory committee set up to look into the causes behind the breakdown in the peace process, chaired by George J. Mitchell) published its report in May 2001. In the Mitchell Report, the government of Israel asserted that:

The immediate catalyst for the violence was the breakdown of the Camp David negotiations on July 25, 2000, and the "widespread appreciation in the international community of Palestinian responsibility for the impasse". In this view, Palestinian violence was planned by the PA leadership, and was aimed at "provoking and incurring Palestinian casualties as a means of regaining the diplomatic initiative".

The Palestine Liberation Organization, according to the same report, denied that the Intifada was planned, and asserted that "Camp David represented nothing less than an attempt by Israel to extend the force it exercises on the ground to negotiations." The report also stated:

From the perspective of the PLO, Israel responded to the disturbances with excessive and illegal use of deadly force against demonstrators; behavior which, in the PLO's view, reflected Israel's contempt for the lives and safety of Palestinians. For Palestinians, the widely seen images of Muhammad al-Durrah in Gaza on September 30, shot as he huddled behind his father, reinforced that perception.

The Mitchell report concluded:

The Sharon visit did not cause the "Al-Aqsa Intifada". But it was poorly timed and the provocative effect should have been foreseen; indeed it was foreseen by those who urged that the visit be prohibited.

and also:

We have no basis on which to conclude that there was a deliberate plan by the PA to initiate a campaign of violence at the first opportunity; or to conclude that there was a deliberate plan by the [Government of Israel] to respond with lethal force.

=== Contributing factors ===
Palestinians have claimed that Sharon's visit was the beginning of the Second Intifada, while others have claimed that Yasser Arafat had pre-planned the uprising.

Some, like Bill Clinton, say that tensions were high due to failed negotiations at the Camp David Summit in July 2000. They note that there were Israeli casualties as early as 27 September; this is the Israeli "conventional wisdom", according to Jeremy Pressman, and the view expressed by the Israeli Foreign Ministry. Most mainstream media outlets have taken the view that the Sharon visit was the spark that triggered the rioting at the start of the Second Intifada. In the first five days of rioting and clashes after the visit, Israeli police and security forces killed 47 Palestinians and wounded 1885, while Palestinians killed 5 Israelis.

Palestinians view the Second Intifada as part of their ongoing struggle for national liberation and an end to Israeli occupation, whereas many Israelis consider it to be a wave of Palestinian terrorism instigated and pre-planned by then Palestinian leader Yasser Arafat.

Support for the idea that Arafat planned the uprising comes from Hamas leader Mahmoud al-Zahar, who said in September 2010 that when Arafat realized that the Camp David Summit in July 2000 would not result in the meeting of all of his demands, he ordered Hamas as well as Fatah and the Aqsa Martyrs Brigades, to launch "military operations" against Israel. Al-Zahar is corroborated by Mosab Hassan Yousef, son of the Hamas founder and leader, Sheikh Hassan Yousef, who claims that the Second Intifada was a political maneuver premeditated by Arafat. Yousef claims that "Arafat had grown extraordinarily wealthy as the international symbol of victimhood. He wasn't about to surrender that status and take on the responsibility of actually building a functioning society."

David Samuels quoted Mamduh Nofal, former military commander of the Democratic Front for the Liberation of Palestine, who supplied more evidence of pre-28 September military preparations. Nofal recounts that Arafat "told us, Now we are going to the fight, so we must be ready". Barak as early as May had drawn up contingency plans to halt any intifada in its tracks by the extensive use of IDF snipers, a tactic that resulted in the high number of casualties among Palestinians during the first days of rioting.

Arafat's widow Suha Arafat reportedly said on Dubai television in December 2012 that her husband had planned the uprising: "Immediately after the failure of the Camp David [negotiations], I met him in Paris upon his return.... Camp David had failed, and he said to me, 'You should remain in Paris.' I asked him why, and he said, 'Because I am going to start an intifada. They want me to betray the Palestinian cause. They want me to give up on our principles, and I will not do so,'" the research institute [MEMRI] translated Suha as saying.

Israel's unilateral pullout from Lebanon in the summer of 2000 was, according to Philip Mattar, interpreted by the Arabs as an Israeli defeat and had a profound influence on tactics adopted in the Al Aqsa Intifada. PLO official Farouk Kaddoumi told reporters: "We are optimistic. Hezbollah's resistance can be used as an example for other Arabs seeking to regain their rights." Many Palestinian officials have gone on record as saying that the intifada had been planned long in advance to put pressure on Israel. It is disputed however whether Arafat himself gave direct orders for the outbreak, though he did not intervene to put a brake on it A personal advisor to Arafat, Manduh Nufal, claimed in early 2001 that the Palestinian Authority had played a crucial role in the outbreak of the Intifada. Israeli's military response demolished a large part of the infrastructure built by the PA during the years following the Oslo Accords in preparation for a Palestinian state. This infrastructure included the legitimate arming of Palestinian forces for the first time: some 90 paramilitary camps had been set up to train Palestinian youths in armed conflict. Some 40,000 armed and trained Palestinians existed in the occupied territories.

On 29 September 2001 Marwan Barghouti, the leader of the Fatah Tanzim in an interview to Al-Hayat, described his role in the lead up to the intifada.

I knew that the end of September was the last period (of time) before the explosion, but when Sharon reached the al-Aqsa Mosque, this was the most appropriate moment for the outbreak of the intifada.... The night prior to Sharon's visit, I participated in a panel on a local television station and I seized the opportunity to call on the public to go to the al-Aqsa Mosque in the morning, for it was not possible that Sharon would reach al-Haram al-Sharif just so, and walk away peacefully. I finished and went to al-Aqsa in the morning.... We tried to create clashes without success because of the differences of opinion that emerged with others in the al-Aqsa compound at the time.... After Sharon left, I remained for two hours in the presence of other people, we discussed the manner of response and how it was possible to react in all the cities (bilad) and not just in Jerusalem. We contacted all (the Palestinian) factions.

Barghouti also went on record as stating that the example of Hezbollah and Israel's withdrawal from Lebanon was a factor which contributed to the Intifada.

According to Nathan Thrall, from Elliott Abrams's inside accounts of negotiations between 2001 and 2005, it would appear to be an inescapable conclusion that violence played an effective role in shaking Israeli complacency and furthering Palestinian goals: the U.S. endorsed the idea of a Palestinian State, Ariel Sharon became the first Israeli Prime Minister to affirm the same idea, and even spoke of Israel's "occupation", and the bloodshed was such that Sharon also decided to withdraw from Gaza, an area he long imagined Israel keeping. However, Zakaria Zubeidi, former leader of the Al-Aqsa Martyrs' Brigades, considers the Intifada to be a total failure that achieved nothing for the Palestinians.

== Casualties ==
The casualty data for the Second Intifada has been reported by a variety of sources and though there is general agreement regarding the overall number of dead, the statistical picture is blurred by disparities in how different types of casualties are counted and categorized.

The sources do not vary widely over the data on Israeli casualties. B'Tselem reports that 1,053 Israelis were killed by Palestinian attacks through 30 April 2008. Israeli journalist Ze'ev Schiff reported similar numbers citing the Shin Bet as his source in an August 2004 Haaretz article where he noted:

The number of Israeli fatalities in the current conflict with the Palestinians exceeded 1,000 last week. Only two of the country's wars – the War of Independence and the Yom Kippur War – have claimed more Israeli lives than this intifada, which began on September 29, 2000. In the Six-Day War, 803 Israelis lost their lives, while the War of Attrition claimed 738 Israeli lives along the borders with Egypt, Syria and Lebanon.

There is little dispute as to the total number of Palestinians killed by Israelis. B'Tselem reports that through 30 April 2008, there were 4,745 Palestinians killed by Israeli security forces, and 44 Palestinians killed by Israeli civilians. B'Tselem also reports 577 Palestinians killed by Palestinians through 30 April 2008.

Between September 2000 and January 2005, 69 percent of Israeli fatalities were male, while over 95 percent of the Palestinian fatalities were male. "Remember These Children" reports that as of 1 February 2008, 119 Israeli children, age 17 and under, had been killed by Palestinians. Over the same time period, 982 Palestinian children, age 17 and under, were killed by Israelis.

=== Combatant versus non-combatant deaths ===
Regarding the numbers of Israeli civilian versus combatant deaths, B'Tselem reports that through 30 April 2008 there were 719 Israeli civilians killed and 334 Israeli security force personnel killed.

Israeli total / Palestinian total; Israeli breakdown / Palestinian breakdown; The chart is based on B'Tselem casualty numbers. It does not include the 577 Palestinians killed by Palestinians.

B'Tselem reports that through 30 April 2008, out of 4,745 Palestinians killed by Israeli security forces, there were 1,671 "Palestinians who took part in the hostilities and were killed by Israeli security forces", or 35.2%. According to their statistics, 2,204 of those killed by Israeli security forces "did not take part in the hostilities", or 46.4%. There were 870 (18.5%) who B'Tselem defines as "Palestinians who were killed by Israeli security forces and it is not known if they were taking part in the hostilities".

The B'Tselem casualties breakdown's reliability was questioned and its methodology has been heavily criticized by a variety of institutions and several groups and researchers, most notably Jerusalem Center for Public Affairs's senior researcher, retired IDF lieutenant colonel Jonathan Dahoah-Halevi, who claimed that B'Tselem repeatedly classifies terror operatives and armed combatants as "uninvolved civilians", but also criticized the Israeli government for not collecting and publishing casualty data. Caroline B. Glick, deputy managing editor of The Jerusalem Post and former advisor to Benjamin Netanyahu, pointed to several instances where, she claimed, B'Tselem had misrepresented Palestinian rioters or terrorists as innocent victims, or where B'Tselem failed to report when an Arab allegedly changed his testimony about an attack by settlers. The Committee for Accuracy in Middle East Reporting in America (CAMERA), which said that B'Tselem repeatedly classified Arab combatants and terrorists as civilian casualties.

The Israeli International Policy Institute for Counter-Terrorism (IPICT), on the other hand, in a "Statistical Report Summary" for 27 September 2000, through 1 January 2005, indicates that 56% (1,542) of the 2,773 Palestinians killed by Israelis were combatants. According to their data, an additional 406 Palestinians were killed by actions of their own side. 22% (215) of the 988 Israelis killed by Palestinians were combatants. An additional 22 Israelis were killed by actions of their own side.

IPICT counts "probable combatants" in its total of combatants. From their full report in September 2002:

A 'probable combatant' is someone killed at a location and at a time during which an armed confrontation was going on, who appears most likely – but not certain – to have been an active participant in the fighting. For example, in many cases where an incident has resulted in a large number of Palestinian casualties, the only information available is that an individual was killed when Israeli soldiers returned fire in response to shots fired from a particular location. While it is possible that the person killed had not been active in the fighting and just happened to be in the vicinity of people who were, it is reasonable to assume that the number of such coincidental deaths is not particularly high. Where the accounts of an incident appear to support such a coincidence, the individual casualty has been given the benefit of the doubt, and assigned a non-combatant status.

In the same 2002 IPICT full report there is a pie chart (Graph 2.9) that lists the IPICT combatant breakdown for Palestinian deaths through September 2002. Here follow the statistics in that pie chart used to come up with the total combatant percentage through September 2002:

Combatants	Percent of all Palestinian deaths
Full Combatants	44.8%
Probable Combatants	8.3%
Violent Protesters	1.6%
Total Combatants	54.7%

On 24 August 2004, Haaretz reporter Ze'ev Schiff published casualty figures based on Shin Bet data. The Haaretz article reported: "There is a discrepancy of two or three casualties with the figures tabulated by the Israel Defense Forces."

Here is a summary of the figures presented in the article:

- Over 1,000 Israelis were killed by Palestinian attacks in the al-Aqsa Intifada.
- Palestinians sources claim 2,736 Palestinians killed in the Intifada.
- The Shin Bet has the names of 2,124 Palestinian dead.
- Out of the figure of 2,124 dead, Shin Bet assigned them to these organizations:
  - 466 Hamas members
  - 408 Fatah's Tanzim and al-Aqsa Martyrs' Brigades
  - 205 Palestinian Islamic Jihad
  - 334 of "Palestinian security forces – for example, Force 17, the Palestinian police, General Intelligence, and the counter security apparatus"

The article does not say whether those killed were combatants or not. Here is a quote:

The Palestinian security forces – for example, Force 17, the Palestinian police, General Intelligence, and the counter security apparatus – have lost 334 of its members during the current conflict, the Shin Bet figures show.

In response to IDF statistics about Palestinian casualties in the West Bank, the Israeli human rights organization B'Tselem reported that two-thirds of the Palestinians killed in 2004 did not participate in the fighting.

In 2009, historian Benny Morris stated in his retrospective book One State, Two States that about one third of the Palestinian deaths up to 2004 had been civilians.

=== Palestinians killed by Palestinians ===
B'Tselem reports that through 30 April 2008, there were 577 Palestinians killed by Palestinians. Of those, 120 were "Palestinians killed by Palestinians for suspected collaboration with Israel". B'Tselem maintains a list of deaths of Palestinians killed by Palestinians with details about the circumstances of the deaths. Some of the many causes of death are crossfire, factional fighting, kidnappings, collaboration, etc.

Concerning the killing of Palestinians by other Palestinians, a January 2003 The Humanist magazine article reports:

For over a decade the PA has violated Palestinian human rights and civil liberties by routinely killing civilians—including collaborators, demonstrators, journalists, and others—without charge or fair trial. Of the total number of Palestinian civilians killed during this period by both Israeli and Palestinian security forces, 16 percent were the victims of Palestinian security forces.

... According to Freedom House's annual survey of political rights and civil liberties, Freedom in the World 2001–2002, the chaotic nature of the Intifada along with strong Israeli reprisals has resulted in a deterioration of living conditions for Palestinians in Israeli-administered areas. The survey states:

Civil liberties declined due to: shooting deaths of Palestinian civilians by Palestinian security personnel; the summary trial and executions of alleged collaborators by the Palestinian Authority (PA); extra-judicial killings of suspected collaborators by militias; and the apparent official encouragement of Palestinian youth to confront Israeli soldiers, thus placing them directly in harm's way.

Internal Palestinian violence has been called an 'Intra'fada during this Intifada and the previous one.

== Aftermath ==
On 25 January 2006, the Palestinians held general elections for the Palestinian Legislative Council. The Islamist group Hamas won with an unexpected majority of 74 seats, compared to 45 seats for Fatah and 13 for other parties and independents. Hamas is officially declared as a terrorist organization by the United States and the European Union and its gaining control over the Palestinian Authority (such as by forming the government) would jeopardize international funds to the PA, by laws forbidding the sponsoring of terrorist groups.

On 9 June, seven members of the Ghalia family were killed on a Gaza beach. The cause of the explosion remains uncertain. Nevertheless, in response, Hamas declared an end to its commitment to a ceasefire declared in 2005 and announced the resumption of attacks on Israelis. Palestinians blame an Israeli artillery shelling of nearby locations in the northern Gaza Strip for the deaths, while an Israeli military inquiry cleared itself from the charges.

On 25 June, a military outpost was attacked by Palestinian militants and a gunbattle followed that left 2 Israeli soldiers and 3 Palestinian militants dead. Corporal Gilad Shalit, an Israeli soldier, was captured and Israel warned of an imminent military response if the soldier was not returned unharmed. In the early hours of 28 June Israeli tanks, APCs and troops entered the Gaza Strip just hours after the air force had taken out two main bridges and the only powerstation in the strip, effectively shutting down electricity and water. Operation Summer Rains commenced, the first major phase of the Gaza–Israel conflict, which continues to run independently of the intifada.

On 26 November 2006, a truce was implemented between Israel and the Palestinian Authority. A 10 January 2007, Reuters article reports: "Hamas has largely abided by a November 26 truce which has calmed Israeli–Palestinian violence in Gaza."

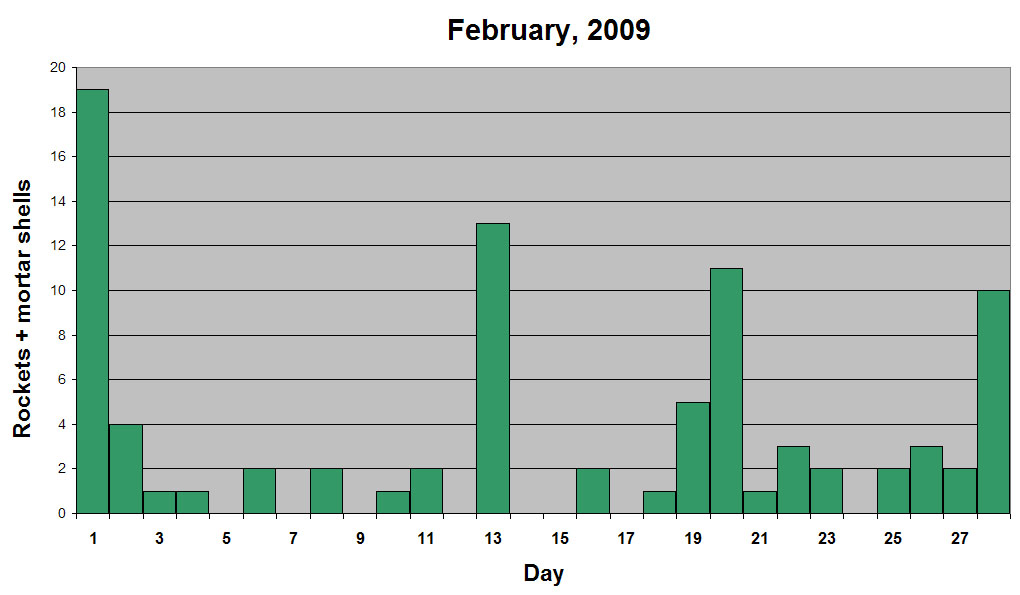
Rocket and mortar shells from Gaza into Israel, February 2009

=== 2008–2009 Gaza–Israel War ===
An intensification of the Gaza–Israel conflict, the Gaza war, occurred on 27 December 2008 (11:30 a.m. local time; 09:30 UTC) when Israel launched a military campaign codenamed Operation Cast Lead (Hebrew: מבצע עופרת יצוקה) targeting the members and infrastructure of Hamas in response to the numerous rocket attacks upon Israel from the Gaza Strip. The operation has been termed the Gaza massacre (Arabic: مجزرة غزة) by Hamas leaders and much of the media in the Arab World. Studies published in the international medical journal ‘Global Public Health’ indicate that Israel violated human rights by targeting medical personnel and civilians, preventing emergency medical evacuations and restricting health care to civilians.

On Saturday, 17 January 2009, Israel announced a unilateral ceasefire, conditional on elimination of further rocket and mortar attacks from Gaza, and began withdrawing over the next several days. Hamas later announced its own ceasefire, with its own conditions of complete withdrawal and opening of border crossings. A reduced level of mortar fire originating in Gaza continues, though Israel has so far not taken this as a breach of the ceasefire. The frequency of the attacks can be observed in the thumbnailed graph. The data corresponds to the article "Timeline of the Gaza War (2008–2009)", using mainly Haaretz news reports from 1 February up to 28 February. The usual IDF responses are airstrikes on weapon smuggling tunnels.

The violence continued on both sides throughout 2006. On 27 December the Israeli Human Rights Organization B'Tselem released its annual report on the Intifada. According to which, 660 Palestinians, a figure more than three times the number of Palestinian fatalities in 2005, and 23 Israelis, were killed in 2006. From a 28 December Haaretz article: "According to the report, about half of the Palestinians killed, 322, did not take part in the hostilities at the time they were killed. 22 of those killed were targets of assassinations, and 141 were minors." 405 of 660 Palestinians were killed in the 2006 Gaza–Israel conflict, which lasted from 28 June till 26 November.

== Tactics ==
Unlike the First Intifada, a Palestinian civil uprising mainly focused on mass protests and general strikes, the Second Intifada rapidly turned into an armed conflict between Palestinian militant groups and the Israel Defense Forces. Palestinian tactics focused on Israeli civilians, soldiers, police and other security forces, and methods of attack included suicide bombings, launching rockets and mortars into Israel, kidnapping of both soldiers and civilians, including children, shootings, assassination, stabbings, and lynchings.

Israeli tactics included firing live ammunition into crowds of protesters, even when the lives of Israeli Security forces were not at threat, shelling residential areas including the use of up to one-ton bombs over densely populated civilian areas, extrajudicial assassinations, setting up checkpoints, imposing curfews, and collective punishment through the demolition of Palestinian homes and orchards[. The tactics used by Israel throughout the second intifada have been criticized by human rights groups as tantamount to war crimes, and resulted in the deaths of many civilians, including women and children.

=== Palestinians ===
Militant groups involved in violence include Hamas, Palestinian Islamic Jihad, Popular Front for the Liberation of Palestine (PFLP) and the al-Aqsa Martyrs' Brigades. The most lethal Palestinian tactic was the suicide bombing (see List). Conducted as a single or double bombing, suicide bombings were generally conducted against "soft" targets, or "lightly hardened" targets (such as checkpoints) to try to raise the cost of the war to Israelis and demoralize the Israeli society. Most suicide bombing attacks (although not all) targeted civilians, and were conducted in crowded places in Israeli cities, such as public transport, restaurants, shopping malls and markets.

One major development was the use of suicide bombs carried by children. Unlike most suicide bombings, the use of these not only earned condemnation from the United States and from human rights groups such as Amnesty International, but also from many Palestinians and much of the Middle East press. The youngest Palestinian suicide bomber was 16-year-old Issa Bdeir, a high school student from the village of Al Doha, who shocked his friends and family when he blew himself up in a park in Rishon LeZion, killing a teenage boy and an elderly man. The youngest attempted suicide bombing was by a 14-year-old captured by soldiers at the Huwwara checkpoint before managing to do any harm.

Militant groups also waged a high-intensity campaign of guerrilla warfare against Israeli military and civilian targets inside Israel and in the Palestinian Territories, utilizing tactics such as ambushes, sniper attacks, and suicide bombings. Military equipment was mostly imported, while some light arms, hand grenades and explosive belts, assault rifles, and Qassam rockets were indigenously produced. They also increased use of remote-controlled landmines against Israeli armor, a tactic that was highly popular among the poorly armed groups. Car bombs were often used against "lightly hardened" targets such as Israeli armored jeeps and checkpoints. Also, more than 1,500 Palestinian drive-by shootings killed 75 people in only the first year of the Intifada.

In May 2004, Israel Defense minister Shaul Mofaz claimed that United Nations Relief and Works Agency for Palestine Refugees in the Near East's ambulances were used to take the bodies of dead Israeli soldiers in order to prevent the Israel Defense Forces from recovering their dead. Reuters has provided video of healthy armed men entering ambulance with UN markings for transport. UNRWA initially denied that its ambulances carry militants but later reported that the driver was forced to comply with threats from armed men. UNRWA still denies that their ambulances carried body parts of dead Israeli soldiers.

In August 2004, Israel said that an advanced explosives-detection device employed by the IDF at the Hawara checkpoint near Nablus discovered a Palestinian ambulance had transported explosive material.

Some of the Palestinian reaction to Israeli policy in the West Bank and Gaza Strip has consisted of non-violent protest, primarily in and near the village of Bil'in. Groups such as the Palestinian Centre for Rapprochement, which works out of Beit Sahour, formally encourage and organize non-violent resistance. Other groups, such as the International Solidarity Movement openly advocate non-violent resistance. Some of these activities are done in cooperation with internationals and Israelis, such as the weekly protests against the Israeli West Bank Barrier carried out in villages like Bi'lin, Biddu and Budrus. This model of resistance has spread to other villages like Beit Sira, Hebron, Saffa, and Ni'lein. During the Israeli re-invasion of Jenin and Nablus, "A Call for a Non-violent Resistance Strategy in Palestine" was issued by two Palestinian Christians in May 2002.

Non-violent tactics have sometimes been met with Israeli military force. For example, Amnesty International notes that "10-year-old Naji Abu Qamer, 11-year-old Mubarak Salim al-Hashash and 13-year-old Mahmoud Tariq Mansour were among eight unarmed demonstrators killed in the early afternoon of May 19, 2004 in Rafah, in the Gaza Strip, when the Israeli army open fire on a non-violent demonstration with tank shells and a missile launched from a helicopter gunship. Dozens of other unarmed demonstrators were wounded in the attack." According to Israeli army and government officials, the tanks shelled a nearby empty building and a helicopter fired a missile in a nearby open space in order to deter the demonstrators from proceeding towards Israeli army positions.

=== Israel ===
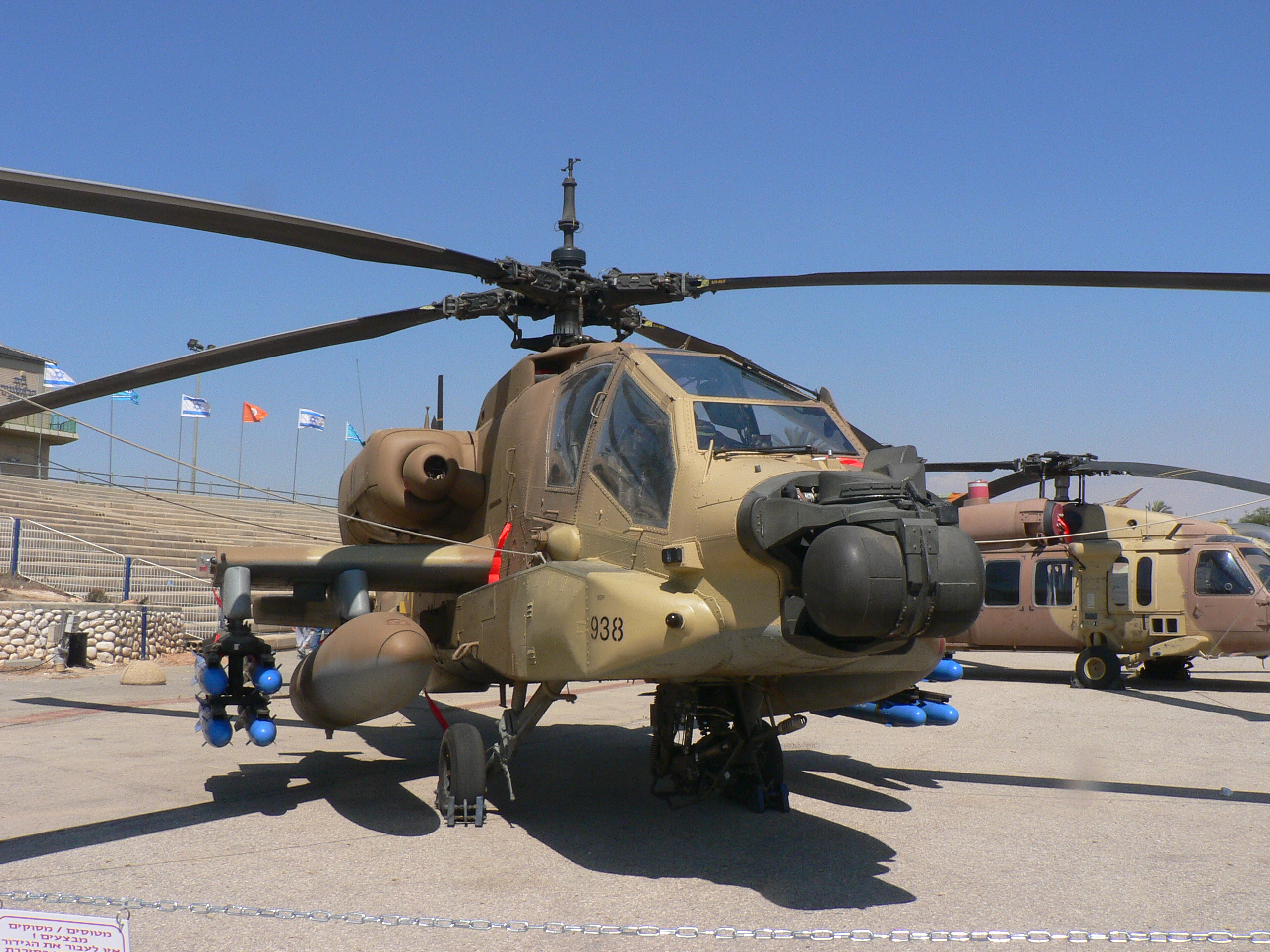
The Israeli Air Force (IAF) AH-64 Apache were used as platform for shooting guided missiles at Palestinian targets and employed at the targeted killings policy against senior militants and terrorists leaders.

The Israel Defense Forces (IDF) countered Palestinian attacks with incursions against militant targets into the West Bank and Gaza Strip, adopting highly effective urban combat tactics. The IDF stressed the safety of their troops, using such heavily armored equipment as the Merkava heavy tank and armored personnel carriers, and carried out airstrikes with various military aircraft including F-16s, drone aircraft and helicopter gunships to strike militant targets. Much of the ground fighting was conducted house-to-house by well-armed and well-trained infantry. Due to its superior training, equipment, and numbers, the IDF had the upper hand during street fighting. Palestinian armed groups suffered heavy losses during combat, but the operations were often criticized internationally due to the civilian casualties often caused. Palestinian metalworking shops and other business facilities suspected by Israel of being used to manufacture weapons were regularly targeted by airstrikes, as well as Gaza Strip smuggling tunnels.

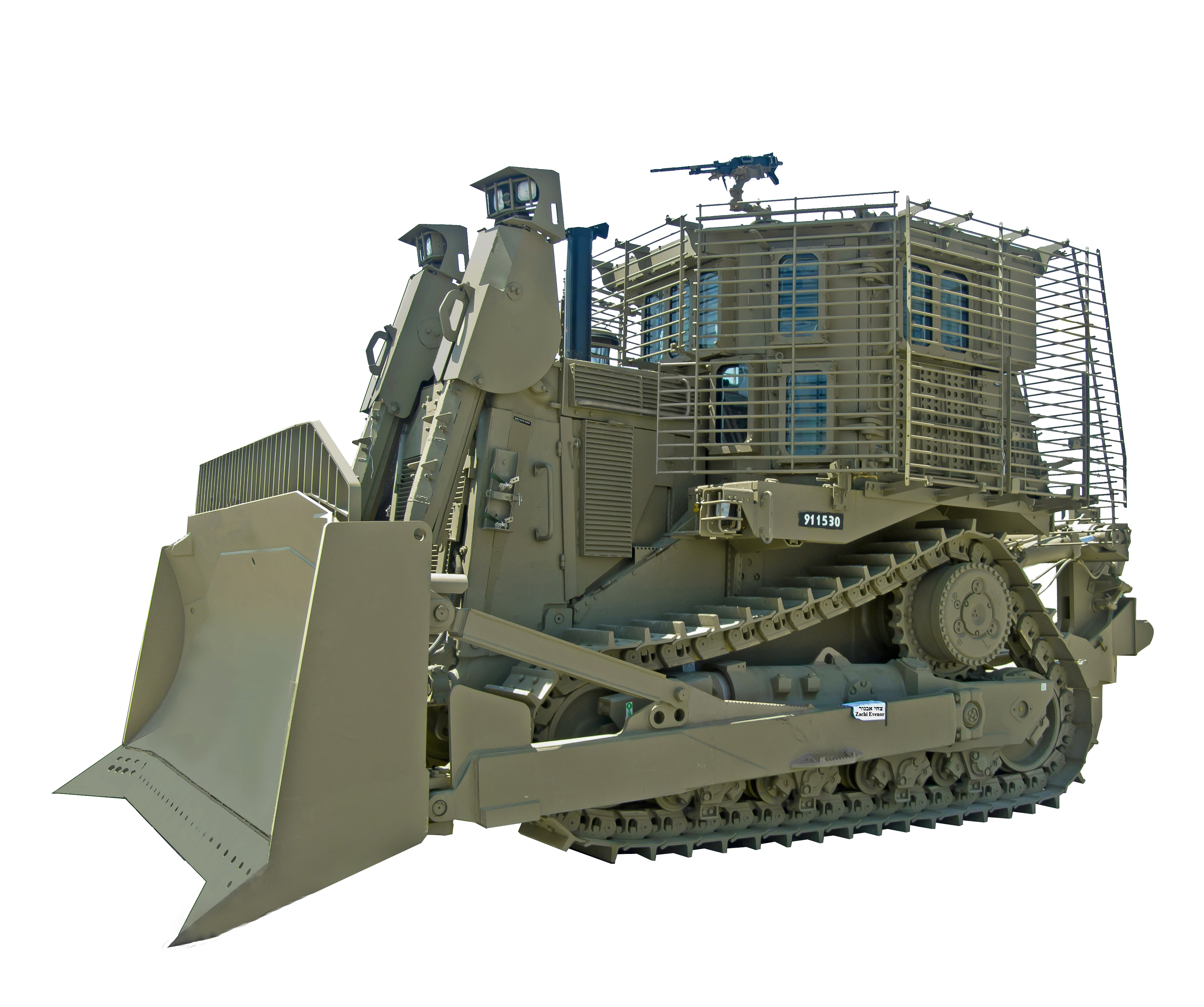
IDF Caterpillar D9 armoured bulldozer. Military experts cited the D9 as a key factor in keeping IDF casualties low.

Israeli Caterpillar D9 armored bulldozers were routinely employed to detonate booby traps and IEDs, to demolish houses along the border with Egypt that were used for shooting at Israeli troops, to create "buffer zones", and to support military operations in the West Bank. Until February 2005, Israel had in place a policy to demolish the family homes of suicide bombers after giving them a notice to evacuate. Due to the considerable number of Palestinians living in single homes, the large quantity of homes destroyed, and collateral damage from home demolitions, it became an increasingly controversial tactic. Families began providing timely information to Israeli forces regarding suicide bombing activities in order to prevent the demolition of their homes, although families doing so risked being executed or otherwise punished for collaboration, either by the Palestinian Authority or extrajudicially by Palestinian militants. The IDF committee studying the issue recommended ending the practice because the policy was not effective enough to justify its costs to Israel's image internationally and the backlash it created among Palestinians.

With complete ground and air superiority, mass arrests were regularly conducted by Israeli military and police forces; at any given time, there were about 6,000 Palestinian prisoners detained in Israeli prisons, about half of them held temporarily without a final indictment, in accordance with Israeli law.

The tactic of military "curfew" – long-term lockdown of civilian areas – was used extensively by Israel throughout the Intifada. The longest curfew was in Nablus, which was kept under curfew for over 100 consecutive days, with generally under two hours per day allowed for people to get food or conduct other business.

Security checkpoints and roadblocks were erected inside and between Palestinian cities, subjecting all people and vehicles to security inspection for free passage. Israel defended those checkpoints as being necessary to stop militants and limit the ability to move weapons around. However some Palestinian, Israeli and International observers and organizations have criticized the checkpoints as excessive, humiliating, and a major cause of the humanitarian situation in the Occupied Territories. Transit could be delayed by several hours, depending on the security situation in Israel. Sniper towers were used extensively in the Gaza Strip before the Israeli pullout.

The Israeli intelligence services Shin Bet and Mossad penetrated Palestinian militant organizations by relying on moles and sources within armed groups, tapping communication lines, and aerial reconnaissance. The intelligence gathered allowed the IDF, Israel Border Police, and Israel Police, including Yamam and Mistaravim special forces units, to thwart hundreds of planned suicide bombings. The intelligence gathered also helped create a list of Palestinians marked for targeted killings.

Israel extensively used targeted killings, the assassinations of Palestinians involved in organizing attacks against Israelis, to eliminate imminent threats and to deter others from following suit, relying primarily on airstrikes and covert operations to carry them out. The strategy of targeted killings had been proposed by Shin Bet, which determined that while it was impossible to stop every single suicide bomber, suicide bombings could be stopped by directly attacking the conspiratorial infrastructure behind them by killing operational commanders, recruiters, couriers, weapons procurers, maintainers of safehouses, and smugglers of money which financed the bombings. Israel was criticized for the use of helicopter gunships in urban assassinations, which often resulted in civilian casualties. Israel criticized what it described as a practice of militant leaders hiding among civilians in densely populated areas, thus turning them into unwitting human shields. Throughout the Intifada, the Palestinian leadership suffered heavy losses through targeted killings.

The practice has been widely condemned as extrajudicial executions by the international community, while the Israeli High Court ruled that it is a legitimate measure of self-defense against terrorism. Many criticize the targeted killings for placing civilians at risk, though its supporters believe it reduces civilian casualties on both sides.

In response to repeated rocket attacks from the Gaza Strip, the Israeli Navy imposed a maritime blockade on the area. Israel also sealed the border and closed Gaza's airspace in coordination with Egypt, and subjected all humanitarian supplies entering the Strip to security inspection before transferring them through land crossings. Construction materials were declared banned due to their possible use to build bunkers. The blockade has been internationally criticized as a form of "collective punishment" against Gaza's civilian population.

== International involvement ==
The international community has long taken an involvement in the Israeli–Palestinian conflict, and this involvement has only increased during the al-Aqsa Intifada. Israel currently receives $3 billion in annual military aid from the United States, excluding loan guarantees. Even though Israel is a developed industrial country, it has remained as the largest annual recipient of US foreign assistance since 1976. It is also the only recipient of US economic aid that does not have to account for how it is spent. The Palestinian Authority receives $100 million annually in military aid from the United States and $2 billion in global financial aid, including "$526 million from Arab League, $651 million from the European Union, $300 million from the US and about $238 million from the World Bank". According to the United Nations, the Palestinian territories are among the leading humanitarian aid recipients.

Additionally, private groups have become increasingly involved in the conflict, such as the International Solidarity Movement on the side of the Palestinians, and the American Israel Public Affairs Committee on the side of the Israelis.

In the 2001 and 2002 Arab League Summits, the Arab states pledged support for the Second Intifada just as they had pledged support for the First Intifada in two consecutive summits in the late 1980s.

== Impact on the Oslo Accords ==
Since the start of the Second Intifada and its emphasis on suicide bombers deliberately targeting civilians riding public transportation (buses), the Oslo Accords began to be viewed with increasing disfavor by the Israeli public. In May 2000, seven years after the Oslo Accords and five months before the start of the Second Intifada, a survey by the Tami Steinmetz Center for Peace Research at the Tel Aviv University found that 39% of all Israelis support the Accords and that 32% believe that the Accords will result in peace in the next few years. In contrast, a survey in May 2004 found that 26% of all Israelis support the Accords and 18% believe that the Accords will result in peace in the next few years; decreases of 13% and 16% respectively. Furthermore, a later survey found that 80% of all Israelis believe the Israel Defense Forces have succeeded in dealing with the Second Intifada militarily.

== Economic effects ==
=== Israel ===
The Israeli commerce experienced a significant negative effect, particularly due to a sharp drop in tourism. A representative of Israel's Chamber of Commerce estimated the cumulative economic damage caused by the crisis at 150 to 200 billion shekels (US$35–45 billion) – against an annual GDP of $122 billion in 2002. The Israeli economy recovered after 2005 with the sharp decrease in suicide bombings, following IDF's and Shin-Bet's efforts.

=== Palestinian Authority ===
The Office of the United Nations Special Coordinator for the Middle East Peace Process (UNSCO) estimated the damage to the Palestinian economy at over $1.1 billion in the first quarter of 2002, compared to an annual GDP of $4.5 billion.

== See also ==
- 1990 Temple Mount riots
- 2014 Jerusalem unrest
- First Intifada (1987–1993)
- Israeli demolition of Palestinian property
- Israeli disengagement from the Gaza Strip (2005)
- List of modern conflicts in the Middle East
- Occupied Palestinian territories
- Palestinian nationalism
- Palestinian political violence
- Sharm El Sheikh Summit of 2005
- Sumud (steadfastness)
- Taba Summit (2001)
- Timeline of the Israeli–Palestinian conflict in 2015
- West Bank barrier – started in 2002

Directly connected to the Second Intifada and its aftermath

- Civilian casualties in the Second Intifada
- List of Palestinian suicide attacks
- Timeline of the Israeli–Palestinian conflict in 2000
- Timeline of the Israeli–Palestinian conflict in 2001
- Timeline of the Israeli–Palestinian conflict in 2002
- Timeline of the Israeli–Palestinian conflict in 2003
- Timeline of the Israeli–Palestinian conflict in 2004
- Timeline of the Israeli–Palestinian conflict in 2005
- Timeline of the Israeli–Palestinian conflict in 2006
- Timeline of the Israeli–Palestinian conflict in 2007
- Timeline of the Israeli–Palestinian conflict in 2008
