= Timeline of the Israeli–Palestinian conflict in 2000 =

- Timeline of the Israeli–Palestinian conflict
- 1999; 2000; 2001

This page is a partial listing of incidents of violence in the Israeli-Palestinian conflict in 2000.

The year 2000 in Israel and Palestine marked the beginning of the Al-Aqsa Intifada, leading to a number of Palestinian and Israeli deaths.

== January ==
Up to 28 September, 12 Palestinians were killed by the Israeli army in the occupied territories.

== September ==
- September 27: Sgt. David Biri, 19, of Jerusalem, was fatally wounded in a bombing near Netzarim in the Gaza Strip.
- September 29: Border Police Supt. Yosef Tabeja, 27, of Ramle was shot to death by his Palestinian counterpart on a joint patrol near Kalkilya.
- September 29: In a clash between Palestinian stone throwers and Israeli police on the Temple Mount, 5 Palestinians are killed by rubber bullets.
- September 30: 10 Palestinians killed between them, Muhammad al-Durrah, 12, killed in the arms of his father near the former settlement of Netzarim. Nizar Mahmoud Hasan Aida, 16, of Deir Ammar refugee camp, killed by IDF gunfire to his chest during a peace demonstration at Ayosh Junction. Khaled Adli Bassem al-Bazyan, 14, of Nablus, killed by IDF gunfire to his abdomen during a demonstration on the Nablus-Ramallah road.

== October ==
- October 1: Border Police Cpl. Madhat Yusuf, a 19 year old Druze of Beit Jann, was killed in a gun battle when hundreds of rioters attacked Joseph's tomb in Nablus, throwing stones, throwing Molotov cocktails, and shooting into the complex.
- October 1: Several civilian children deaths, Muhammad Nabil Daoud Hamad al-Abasi, 16, of Al-Bireh, killed by IDF gunfire to his head during a demonstration at Ayosh Junction. Sara Abdul-Azim Abdul-Haq Hasan, 18 months, of Sarah, near Salfit, killed by Israeli settler gunfire to her head while riding with her father in a car. Samer Samir Sudki Tabanja, 12, of Nablus, killed by IDF helicopter gunfire to his head while watching a demonstration. Sami Fathi Muhammad al-Taramsi, 17, of Gaza City, killed by IDF gunfire to his head during a demonstration at Netzarim Junction. Hussam Naim Hasan Bakhit, 17, of Balata refugee camp, killed by IDF helicopter fire to his head while watching a demonstration. Iyad Ahmad al-Khashishi, 16, of Nablus, died of chest wounds sustained Sept. 30 from IDF gunfire while at a demonstration on the Nablus-Ramallah road.
- October 2: Wael Tayseer Muhammad Qatawi, 14, of Balata refugee camp, killed by IDF gunfire to his chest.
- October 2: Wichlav Zalsevsky, 24, of Ashdod, was shot in the head in the village of Masha on the trans-Samaria highway.
- October 2: Sgt. Max Hazan, 20, of Dimona, died to sniper fire injuries sustained near Beit Sahur.
- October 3: Hussam Mahmoud Ismael al-Hamshari, 15, of Tulkarm, died of head wounds sustained Oct. 1 from IDF gunfire during a demonstration. Amr Kahlil Mustafa al-Rifai, 17, of Maghazi refugee camp, Gaza, killed by IDF gunfire to his head and chest during a demonstration at Netzarim Junction.
- October 4: Muhammad Yousef Zayd abu-Asi, 13, of Bani Suheila, Gaza, killed by IDF gunfire to his head, chest and back during a demonstration at Netzarim Junction.
- October 6: Majdi Samir Musa al-Misilmani, 15, of Beit Hanina, near Jerusalem, killed by IDF gunfire to his head during a demonstration. Muhammad Khaled Mahmoud Tammam, 17, of Tulkarm, killed by IDF shelling to his chest.
- October 8: The bullet-riddled body of Rabbi Hillel Lieberman, a 36 year old American immigrant, from Elon Moreh, was found at the southern entrance to Nablus.
- October 10: Aseel Hassan Asleh, 17, of Araba, near Nazareth, Palestinian with Israeli citizenship and an active Seeds of Peace participant, killed by Israeli police gunfire to his neck at close range while at a demonstration near his village.
- October 11: Sami Hasan Salim Silmi Salama, 17, of Tulkarm, killed by IDF gunfire to his chest.
- October 12: Sami Fathi Abdallah abu-Jazar, 12, of Rafah, Gaza, died of head wounds sustained Oct. 10 from IDF gunfire during a demonstration.
- October 12: In the 2000 Ramallah Lynching, two IDF reserve personnel, Yossi Avrahami (38) and Vadim Nurzhitz (33) accidentally entered Ramallah where they were held in a police station. Over 1,000 Palestinians attacked the police station injuring 13 Palestinian policemen before beating and stabbing the IDF reservists to death.
- October 16: Muayad Usama Ali al-Jawarish, 14, of Aida refugee camp, killed by IDF gunfire to his chest and abdomen while on the way to school.
- October 20: Muhammad Adel Hasan abu-Tahun, 15, of Tulkarm, killed by IDF gunfire to his head and chest during a demonstration. Samer Talal al-Awaisi, 16, of Qalqilya, killed by IDF gunfire to his chest during a demonstration. Ala Bassam Abdullah Bani-Nimra, 13, of Salfit, killed by IDF gunfire to his head during a demonstration. Thaer Ali Daoud Omar Muala, 17, Amari refugee camp, killed by IDF gunfire to his head during a demonstration at Ayosh Junction.
- October 19: Holocaust survivor Rabbi Binyamin Herling, 64, of Kedumim, was killed when Fatah members and Palestinian security forces opened fire on a group of Israeli men, women, and children on a trip at Mount Ebal near Nablus. His grandson, Dvir, was also murdered 19 years later.
- October 21: Omar Ismael Omar al-Buhisi, 16, of Deir al-Balah, Gaza, killed by IDF gunfire to his chest during a demonstration near the Kfar Darom settlement. Majid Ibrahim Hasan Hawamdeh, 15, of al-Bireh, killed by IDF gunfire to his head during a demonstration.
- October 22: Salahaldeen Fawzi Ahmad al-Nijmi, 15, of Maghazi refugee camp, Gaza, killed by IDF gunfire to his chest during a demonstration near the Kfar Darom settlement. Wael Mahmoud Imad al-Nasheet, 12, of Jabalia refugee camp, Gaza, killed by an IDF rubber-coated bullet to his head during a demonstration near the Erez industrial zone.
- October 23: Ashraf Ahmad Abdul-Majid al-Habayeb, 15, of Askar refugee camp, died of head wounds sustained Oct. 16 from IDF gunfire during a demonstration. Saed Adnan Abdullah al-Tambour, 17, of Nablus, killed by IDF gunfire to his head while picking olives.
- October 24: Nidal Muhammad Zuhdi al-Dbeiki, 16, of Gaza City, killed by IDF gunfire to his abdomen during a demonstration near the Erez industrial zone. Iyad Usama Taher Shath, 13, of Khan Younis, killed by an IDF rubber-coated bullet to his head during a demonstration. Ala Muhammad Abdul-Rahman Mahfuz al-Jawabra, 14, of Al-Arroub, died of head wounds sustained Oct. 6 from IDF gunfire while on the terrace of his home one hour after injuring an Israeli soldier with a stone.
- October 27: Bashir Saleh Musa Shalawit, 16, of Qalqilya, deaf, killed by IDF gunfire to his abdomen during a demonstration.
- October 28: The body of Marik Gavrilov, 25, of Bnei Aysh was found inside his burned-out car, between the village of Bitunia and Ramallah.
- October 29: Husni Ibrahim Hasan al-Najjar, 17, of Rafah refugee camp, Gaza, killed by IDF gunfire to his head during a demonstration.
- October 30: Eish-Kodesh Gilmor, 25, of Mevo Modi'in, was shot and killed while on duty as a security guard at the National Insurance Institute's East Jerusalem branch. He was survived by his wife and one year old daughter. Another guard was injured.
- October 30: Amos Machlouf, 30, of the Gilo neighborhood in Jerusalem, was found murdered in a ravine near Beit Jala.
- October 31: Thaer Ibrahim Shalsh al-Zayd, 17, of Jalazoun refugee camp, killed by IDF gunfire to his abdomen during a demonstration at Ayosh Junction.

== November ==
- November 1: Lt. David-Hen Cohen, 21, of Karmiel and Sgt. Shlomo Adshina, 20, of Kibbutz Ze'elim were killed in a shooting incident in the Al-Hader area, near Bethlehem, and Amir Zohar, 34, was killed while guarding a town in Jordan Valley. Ahmad Salman Ibrahim abu-Tayeh, 13, of Shati refugee camp, Gaza, killed by IDF gunfire to his head during a demonstration at the Karni checkpoint. Muhammad Ibrahim Muhammad al-Hajjaj, 14, of Gaza City, killed by IDF gunfire to his head and chest during a demonstration at the Karni checkpoint. Ibrahim Riziq Marzuq Omar 15, of Shati refugee camp, Gaza, killed by IDF gunfire to his chest during a demonstration at the Karni checkpoint.
- November 2: Ayelet Shahar Levy, 28, and Hanan Levy, 33 two Israeli civilians killed in a car bombing in Jerusalem. The Islamic Jihad claims responsibility. Khaled Muhammad Ahmed al-Katibw, 17, of Hazma, near Jerusalem, killed by IDF gunfire to his abdomen during a demonstration. Yazen Muhammad Eisa al-Haliqa, 17, of al-Khader, near Bethlehem, killed by IDF gunfire to his head and chest during a demonstration.
- November 3: Rami Ahmad Abdul-Fattah Mutawe, 15, of Hazma, near Jerusalem, killed by IDF gunfire to his abdomen during a demonstration.
- November 4: Hind Nidal Jamil Qauider, 23 days old, of Hebron, killed by IDF gas.
- November 5: Maher Muhammad Ibrahim al-Suedy, 16, of Bureij refugee camp, Gaza, killed by IDF gunfire to his head during a demonstration.
- November 6: Wajdi Alam al-Hattab, 15, of Tulkarm, killed by IDF gunfire to his chest during a demonstration. Muhammad Nawaf Hamad al-Taban, 17, of al-Zawaida, near Deir al-Balah, Gaza, killed by IDF gunfire to his back during a demonstration near the Kfar Darom settlement.
- November 7: Ahmad Amin al-Khuffash, 7, of Murda, near Salfit, murdered by an Israeli settler vehicle.
- November 8: Noa Dahan, 25, of Moshav Mivtahim in the south, was shot to death while driving to her job at the Rafah border crossing in Gaza.
- November 8: Ibrahim Fuad Riziq al-Qasas, 16, of Khan Younis, Gaza, killed by IDF gunfire to his head during a demonstration near the Tufah checkpoint. Muhammad Musbah Ismael abu-Ghali, 16, of Khan Younis, Gaza, killed by IDF gunfire to his chest during a demonstration near the Tufah checkpoint. Khaled Fayez Suleiman abu-Zahra, 17, of Nur al-Shams refugee camp, killed by IDF gunfire to his chest and abdomen. Raed Abdul-Majed Muhammad Daoud, 14, of Hares, near Salfit, killed by IDF gunfire to his abdomen during a demonstration. Fares Fayq Odeh, 14, of Gaza City, killed by IDF gunfire to his head while throwing stones near the Karni checkpoint.
- November 10: Sgt. Shahar Vekret, 20, of Lod was fatally shot by a Palestinian sniper near Rachel's Tomb at the entrance to Bethlehem. Usama Mazen Salim Azouka, 14, of Jenin, killed by IDF gunfire to his chest during a demonstration. Usama Samir Abdul-Nabi al-Jirjawi, 17, of Gaza City, killed by IDF gunfire to his chest during a demonstration near the Karni checkpoint.
- November 11: Sgt. 1st Class Avner Shalom, 28, of Eilat, was killed in a shooting attack at the Gush Katif junction in the Gaza Strip when his jeep was attacked. Musa Ibrahim Musa al-Dibs, 15, of Jabalya refugee camp, Gaza, killed by IDF gunfire to his chest during a demonstration near the Erez industrial zone. Basel Hussein abu-Qamer, 15, of Jabalya, Gaza, killed by IDF gunfire during a demonstration near the Erez industrial zone.
- November 12: Mahmoud Nafez abu-Naji, 15, of Gaza City, killed by IDF gunfire to his chest during a demonstration.
- Nov 13, 2000 - Sarah Leisha, a 42 year old mother of five and a teacher, of Neveh Tzuf was killed in a drive-by shooting gunfire near Ofra, north of Ramallah. Cpl. Elad Wallenstein, 18, of Ashkelon, and Cpl. Amit Zanna, 19, of Netanya were killed by gunfire from a car passing the military bus carrying them near Ofra. Gabi Zaghouri, 36, of Netivot was killed by gunfire directed at the truck he was driving near the Kissufim junction in the southern part of the Gaza Strip.
- November 14: Muhammad Khater Muhammad al-Ajla, 13, of Gaza City, killed by IDF gunfire to his head during a demonstration near the Karni checkpoint. Saber Khamis al-Barash, 15, of Amari refugee camp, killed by IDF gunfire to his chest during a demonstration near the Ayosh Junction.
- November 15: Jadou Maneh Jadou abul-Kabash, 16, of al-Samu, near Hebron, killed by IDF gunfire to his abdomen during a demonstration. Ahmad Samir Basal, 15, of Gaza City, killed by IDF gunfire to his chest during a demonstration near the Karni checkpoint. Ibrahim Abdul-Rauf al-Juedy, 17, of Qalqilya, killed by IDF gunfire to his chest and abdomen during a demonstration. Muhammad Nasr Muhammad al-Shurafi, 17, of Gaza City, killed by IDF gunfire to his head during a demonstration near the Karni checkpoint. Jihad Suheil Suleiman abu-Shahmeh, 13, of Khan Younis, killed by IDF gunfire to his head during a demonstration near the Tufah checkpoint.
- November 17: Muhammad Abdul-Jalil abu-Rayan, 17, of Halhoul, near Hebron, killed by IDF gunfire to his head during a demonstration on Route 60.
- November 18: St -Sgt. Baruch (Snir) Flum, 21, of Tel-Aviv was shot and killed by a senior Palestinian Preventive Security Service officer who infiltrated the Kfar Darom greenhouses in the Gaza Strip. St.-Sgt. Sharon Shitoubi, 21, of Ramle, wounded in the Palestinian shooting attack in Kfar Darom, died of his wounds on Nov 20.
- November 19: Abdul-Rahman Ziad al-Dahshan, 14, of Gaza City, killed by IDF gunfire to his chest during a demonstration at the Karni checkpoint.
- November 20: Miriam Amitai, 35, and Gavriel Biton, 34, both of Kfar Darom, were killed when a roadside bomb exploded alongside a bus carrying children from Kfar Darom to school in Gush Katif. Nine others, including 5 children, were. Ibrahim Ahmad Hasan Othman, 16, of Rafah refugee camp, Gaza, killed by IDF gunfire to his chest.
- November 21: Itamar Yefet, 18, killed by a sniper in Gaza. Yaser Taleb Muhammad al-Nabtiti, 16, of Tulkarm, killed by IDF gunfire to his chest during a demonstration.
- November 22: Shoshana Reis, 21, of Hadera, and Meir Bahrame, 35, of Givat Olga, were killed and over 55 wounded in a car bomb attack in Hadera. Ibrahim Hasan al-Muqanan, 15, of Khan Younis, Gaza, killed by IDF gunfire to his head during a demonstration.
- November 23: Lt. Edward Matchnik, 21, of Beersheba, was killed in an explosion at the District Coordination Office near Gush Katif in the Gaza Strip. Sgt. Samar Hussein, 19, of Hurfeish, was killed when Palestinian snipers opened fire at soldiers patrolling the border fence near the Erez crossing. Maram Imad Ahmad Hasouna, 3, of al-Bireh, killed by IDF gas near her home. Majdi Ali Abed, 15, of Gaza City, died of head wounds sustained Nov. 17 from IDF gunfire during a demonstration near the Karni checkpoint. Aysar Muhammad Sadiq Hasis, 15, of al-Jalameh, near Jenin, killed by IDF gunfire to his head during a demonstration.
- November 24: Maj. Sharon Arameh, 25, of Ashkelon was killed by Palestinian sniper fire in fighting near Neve Dekalim in the Gaza Strip. Ariel Jeraffi, 40, of Petah Tikva, a civilian employed by the IDF, was killed by Palestinian fire as he travelled near Otzarin in the West Bank.
- November 25: Abdul-Minem Muhammad Izaldeen al-Bosta, 17, of Araba, near Jenin, killed by IDF gunfire to his head during a demonstration.
- November 26: Mahdi Qasem Jaber, 17, of Qalqilya, killed by IDF gunfire during a demonstration. Muhammad Mansur Nasr abu-Adwan, 16, of Qalqilya, killed by IDF gunfire during a demonstration.
- November 28: Karam Fathi Shehada al-Kurd, 14, of Rafah, Gaza, died of head wounds sustained Nov. 23 from IDF gunfire during a demonstration near the Rafah border crossing with Egypt.
- November 29: Muhammad Muhammad Abdallah al-Mashrawi, 14, of Gaza City, died of head wounds sustained Nov. 26 from IDF gunfire during a demonstration near the Karni checkpoint.
- November 30: Shadi Ahmad Hasan Zhoul, 14, of Husan, near Bethlehem, killed by an Israeli settler vehicle while walking to school. Walid Muhammad Ahmad al-Badan, 17, of Taqou, near Bethlehem, killed by IDF gunfire to his chest during a demonstration near the Tekoa settlement.

== December ==
- December 1: Muhammad Saleh Muhammad al-Arja, 12, of Rafah, Gaza, killed by Israeli sniper fire to his head near the Rafah border crossing. Medhat Muhammad Subhi Jadallah, 14, of Shati refugee camp, Gaza, killed by IDF gunfire to his head during a demonstration.
- December 5: Ramzi Adel Muhammad Bayatnah, 15, of Abu Qash, near Ramallah, killed by IDF gunfire to his head during a demonstration near the Ayosh Junction.
- December 7: Zuhair Mustafa Ali al-Hattab, 17, of Gaza City, died of head wounds sustained Nov. 20 from IDF gunfire during a demonstration near the Karni checkpoint. Mutaz Azmi Ismael Teilakh, 16, of Dheisheh refugee camp, killed by IDF gunfire to his head during a demonstration.
- December 8: Rina Didovsky, 39, a Beit Hagai school teacher, and Eliyahu Ben-Ami, 41, from Otniel, were killed when a car full of gunmen opened fire on their van near Kiryat Arba Rina Didovsky. Sgt. Tal Gordon, an Israeli soldier is killed in a gunfire attack on a civilian bus. Omar Samir Abdul-Hamid al-Mashni, 16, of Beit Ur al-Tahta, near Ramallah, killed by IDF gunfire to his head during a demonstration following Friday prayers at Jerusalem's al-Aqsa mosque.
- December 9: Salim Muhammad Salim al-Hameida, 13, of Rafah, Gaza, died of head wounds sustained Dec. 5 from IDF gunfire near the Rafah border crossing.
- December 11: Ahmad Ali Darwish al-Qawasma, 14, of Hebron, died of head wounds sustained Dec. 8 from IDF gunfire at close range during clashes.
- December 22: Arafat Muhammad Ali al-Jabarin, 16, of Sa'ir, near Hebron, killed by IDF gunfire to his head while throwing stones in Beit Einun.
- December 15: Muhammad Farouq Daoud, 17, of Harres, near Salfit, killed by IDF gunfire to his chest while throwing stones near the village checkpoint.
- December 20: Hani Yousef Hamid al-Sufi, 14, of Rafah, Gaza, killed by IDF shelling to his head while trying to block the passage of tanks and a bulldozer.
- December 21: Eliyahu Cohen, an Israeli civilian ambushed and killed by Palestinian gunmen near Jerusalem.
- December 28: Capt. Gad Marasha, 30, of Kiryat Arba and Border Police Sgt.-Maj. Yonatan Vermullen, 29, of Ben-Sheme were killed while dismantling a road-side bomb, by another explosive device, in the Gaza strip. The Islamic Jihad claimed responsibility.
- December 31: Binyamin Zeev Kahane (the son of Meir Kahane) and his wife, Talia, killed in an ambush by Palestinian snipers. 5 of their children, aged between two months and 10, were injured. Math Ahmad Muhammad abu-Hadwan, 11, of Hebron, killed by IDF gunfire to his head in Tel Rumeida. Abdul-Rahman Khaled Hammouda Khbeish, 4, of Balata refugee camp, killed by IDF gunfire to his head.

== See also ==
- October 2000 events
- Israeli casualties of war
- house demolition in the Israeli–Palestinian conflict
