= Timeline of the Israeli–Palestinian conflict in 2001 =

- Timeline of the Israeli–Palestinian conflict
- 2000; 2001; 2002

Note: This compilation includes only those attacks on Israelis that resulted in casualties and no Palestinian deaths are recorded. Numerous other attacks which failed to kill, maim, or wound are not included.

== January ==
17 January: 16-year-old Israeli Ofir Rahum is shot and killed near the Palestinian city of Ramallah. Israeli police claimed that he had been shot by members of the Palestinian Tanzim group, which the police suspected had set a trap through a chat room. Israeli Prime Minister Ehud Barak said the event would make it hard to continue peace talks with the Palestinians.

21 January: An Israeli settler named Nachum Korman from the Hadar Beitar settlement, was sentenced to six months' community service and was fined 70,000 shekels for clubbing an 11 year old Palestinian child, Hilmi Shusha, to death with a rifle butt, drawing condemnation from B'Tselem.

23 January: Mordehai Dayan, 27, & Etgar Zeitouny, 34, both of Tel Aviv, were abducted from a restaurant where they had been eating and shot to death in Tul Karem.

28 January: Ehud Barak, Prime Minister of Israel calls off peace talks till after the February 6 Election.

29 January: An Israeli killed in a drive-by shooting north of Jerusalem.

== February ==
6 February: Ariel Sharon is elected Prime Minister of Israel.

8 February: President of the USA, George W. Bush, confirms that the parameters for a Mideast peace deal, presented to Israeli and Palestinian negotiators by President Clinton before he left office, would not be picked up by his administration as a basis for further negotiations.

8 February: A teenaged Palestinian shepherd was killed by Israeli tank fire near the Jewish settlement of Kfar Darom in the Gaza Strip.

8 February: A battle erupted in the West Bank city of Ramallah between Israeli troops and Palestinian security forces. A 15 year old Palestinian stone thrower was killed by the Israelis.

13 February: Massoud Ayyad, a 60 year old lieutenant colonel in Palestinian Authority President Yasser Arafat's bodyguard unit, Force 17, is killed when Israeli helicopter gunships fired four missiles into his car as he drove on the outskirts of the Jabaliya refugee camp, Gaza Strip.

14 February: Hamas claim responsibility for the attack at a Bus Stop that left 7 Israeli Defense Force soldiers and one civilian dead, though the family of the attacker Khalil Abu Olbeh deny any connection with any group.

14 February: Israel shuts border crossings to Jordan and Egypt for Palestinians and bans flights out of Gaza airport, except for travel to Mecca, Saudi Arabia, for the hajj pilgrimage.

== March ==
March 2:

- A Palestinian boy, aged 9 was shot by Israeli soldiers outside his home in Ramallah.
- A Palestinian man with learning difficulties was killed by Israeli soldiers in the Gaza Strip when they suspected him of seeking to plant a bomb on a main road.

March 3: The Israeli Army digs a trench around the West Bank city of Jericho, closing the city's access down to one Israeli controlled checkpoint.

March 4: Hamas claim responsibility for the 2001 Netanya bombing, a suicide bombing by Ahmed Alyan, 23 that left the bomber and three Israelis dead.

March 7: Ariel Sharon is officially sworn in, forming a new national unity government.

March 23: The CIA cease efforts to persuade Israel and the Palestinians to renew security cooperation.

March 26: A Palestinian sniper commits the Murder of Shalhevet Pass, a 10 month old infant as she was held by her father.

March 27: Israel closes all entrances to Hebron, home to 120,000 Palestinians - and imposed a curfew on the 40,000 people living in the old town.

== May ==
May 1: Assaf Hershkovitz, a resident of the Jewish settlement of Ofra, is killed by gunfire while driving. Giv'at Asaf was established near the site of his murder, in his memory.

May 9: Two 14-year settler boys Koby Mandell and Yosef Ishran were stoned to death.

May 18: 5 Israelis killed in a suicide bombing in Netanya. Over 100 are wounded, Hamas claimed responsibility. An Israeli soldier off-duty is killed by gunfire while driving.

== June ==
=== June 1 ===
Dolphinarium massacre: 21 Israeli young people murdered and over 120 wounded by a Hamas militant suicide bombing at a disco near the Dolphinarium in Tel Aviv.

=== June 5 ===
Infant Yehuda Shoham was critically injured in an Arab stone-throwing attack near his home in Shiloh. The baby died of his injuries.

=== June 12 ===
Murder of Georgios Tsibouktzakis: Greek Orthodox churchman is murdered in an Arab drive-by shooting on the Maaleh Adumim road.

=== June 28 ===
A woman murdered and another injured in a drive-by shooting.

== August ==
=== August 9 ===
15 people die and 130 are injured in the Sbarro restaurant suicide bombing in Jerusalem. Both Hamas and Islamic Jihad claim responsibility. An Israeli student killed in a shooting attack north of the West Bank.

== October ==
=== October 17 ===
Israeli Tourism Minister Rehavam Zeevi is assassinated by the PFLP.

== November ==
=== November 4 ===
Two Israeli teenagers killed when fire opened by a Palestinian gunman in Jerusalem. 45 people are injured.

=== November 29 ===
3 people are killed and 9 wounded in a suicide bombing of a bus near Hadera. Both Islamic Jihad and Fatah claimed responsibility. A soldier is killed and another wounded in a shooting incident on the Green Line.

== See also ==
- Israel-Gaza conflict
