= 2005 Sharm El Sheikh Summit =

Egyptian–Israeli–Jordanian–Palestinian diplomatic meeting

The Sharm El Sheikh Summit of 2005 was a high-profile diplomatic meeting between Egypt, Israel, Jordan, and the Palestinian National Authority. Hosted in the Egyptian city of Sharm El Sheikh on 8 February 2005, it was organized in an effort to end the Second Intifada, which had resulted in the deaths of over 3,000 Palestinians and over 1,000 Israelis since it began in September 2000. The four leaders in attendance were Egyptian president Hosni Mubarak, Israeli prime minister Ariel Sharon, Jordanian king Abdullah II, and Palestinian president Mahmoud Abbas. Abbas had recently succeeded Yasser Arafat, who died in November 2004, as the President of the Palestinian National Authority.

Sharon and Abbas explicitly undertook to cease all violence against each other's peoples and affirmed their commitment to the roadmap for peace, which had been proposed by the Middle East Quartet. Sharon also agreed to release 900 of the 7,500 Palestinian prisoners in Israeli custody at the time, and to withdraw from occupied West Bank towns.

== Background ==
The Second Intifada, which began in September 2000, had by February 2005 led to over 5,000 Palestinian and Israeli casualties and took an extensive toll on both economies and societies. The cycle of violence persisted throughout this period, except for a short-lived truce in mid-2003.

Neither side was willing to negotiate until there was a halt to violence. Yasser Arafat, the man thought by many to have engineered the Intifada and to have kept it alive, died in November 2004. The Palestinian presidential election was held on 9 January 2005 to elect Arafat's successor. It confirmed Mahmoud Abbas as President of the Palestinian Authority. His initial efforts were to bring order to the anarchy in the Palestinian territories and halt attacks against Israel. As a good will gesture, Ariel Sharon changed his attitude towards negotiations and ordered a significant reduction of Israeli military activity in the Palestinian territories and took many measures to help Palestinian civilians.

These trust-building steps, together with renewed security coordination between the two sides and the backing of the United States, Jordan and Egypt led to the agreement to hold the Sharm El Sheikh Summit. The summit began with a series of meetings between Sharon and Mubarak, King Abdullah and Abbas. Later, all leaders except King Abdullah read statements reaffirming their commitment to continued efforts to stabilize the situation and reconfirmed their commitment to the Road map for peace process.

== Outcome ==
Though no agreement was signed, Sharon and Abbas in their closing statements explicitly stated their intention for a cessation of all violent activity against each other's peoples, marking a formal end to the Second Intifada. They all reconfirmed their commitment to the Road map for peace process. Sharon also agreed to release 900 Palestinian prisoners and to withdraw from West Bank towns.

== Subsequent events ==
The violence in Israel continued into the following years, though suicide bombings decreased significantly. By May 2005, 500 of the 900 prisoners scheduled for release had been released. However, after Qassam rocket attacks on Sderot on 5 May, Sharon stopped the release of the remaining 400 prisoners, saying the Palestinian Authority needs to rein in the militants.

== See also ==
=== Arab–Israeli peace diplomacy and treaties ===
- Paris Peace Conference, 1919
- Faisal–Weizmann Agreement (1919)
- 1949 Armistice Agreements
- Camp David Accords (1978)
- Egypt–Israel peace treaty (1979)
- Madrid Conference of 1991
- Oslo Accords (1993)
- Israel–Jordan peace treaty (1994)
- Camp David 2000 Summit
- Israeli–Palestinian peace process
- Projects working for peace among Israelis and Arabs
- List of Middle East peace proposals
- International law and the Arab–Israeli conflict
- Agreement on Movement and Access
