= Timeline of the Israeli–Palestinian conflict in 2003 =

- Timeline of the Israeli–Palestinian conflict
- 2002; 2003; 2004

This page is a partial listing of incidents of violence in the Israeli-Palestinian conflict in 2003.

Note: This page is incomplete and does not include all deaths. Additionally, it doesn't include the numerous other attacks which failed to murder, maim, or wound.

== January ==
- 1 January: Tareq Ziad Duas 15-year-old, killed on 1 January 2003. Sami Zidan 22-year-old, killed on 1 January 2003, Muhammad 'Atiyyah Duas 15-year-old killed on 1 January 2003, Jihad Jum'ah 'Abd 5 year-old, killed on 1 January 2003
- 2 January: The charred body of Massoud Makhluf Alon, 72, from Menahemiya in the Lower Galilee, was found in the northern Jordan Valley in his burned out car. The Fatah Al-Aqsa Martyrs' Brigades claimed responsibility for the murder. Tammer Khader 21-year-old, killed on 2 January 2003
- 5 January: 23 people, including eight foreigners, were murdered in two nearly simultaneous suicide bombings in central Tel Aviv. More than 100 others were reported seriously injured. Islamic Jihad and Yasser Arafat's Al Aqsa Martyrs Brigades claimed responsibility. Another arm of Yassar Arafat's movement denied responsibility.
- 6 January: Israeli forces raided the Maghazi refugee camp in Gaza and killed three Palestinians and wounded a dozen more. Baker Muhammad Hadura 24-year-old, killed; Nassim Hassan Abu Maliah 25-year-old, killed; Iyad Muhammad Abu Za'id 26-year-old, killed
- 8 January: Ahmad 'Ajaj 8 January 2003, Aiman Muhammad Haneideq 30-year-old killed
- 10 January: Tareq Mahmoud 'Abd al-Quader Jadu 20-year-old, killed
- 11 January: Basman Shnir 20-year-old killed; 'Abd a-Latif Wadi 30-year-old, killed
- 12 January: Eli Biton, a 48-year-old man was killed and four people wounded when terrorists infiltrated Moshav Gadish and opened fire. The Palestinian Islamic Jihad claimed responsibility for the attack. Mikhail Kazakov, 34, of Jerusalem was killed by militants who infiltrated across the Israel-Egypt border, near the Negev town of Nitzana.
- 12 January: Three Palestinians were killed; Muhammad Quar'a 14-year-old resident of Khan Yunis, killed; 'Ali Thaher Nassar 45-year-old killed; Hamadeh 'Abd a-Rahman a-Najar 13-year-old killed on 12 January 2003 and 12 wounded as 50 Israeli army vehicles accompanied with bulldozers and helicopters entered the town of Khan Yunis in the southern Gaza Strip during the night 11–12 January. Seven civilian facilities were blown up.
- 13 January: Jamal Mahmoud Abu al-Qumbuz 20-year-old killed
- 17 January: 34-year-old Netanel Ozeri was killed when militants entered his home near Kiryat Arba, and opened fire. His 5-year-old daughter and two others were wounded. Hamas claimed responsibility for the attack.
- 23 January: Cpl. Ronald Berer, 20, of Rehovot; Cpl. Assaf Bitan, 19, of Afula; and St.-Sgt. Ya'akov Naim, 20, of Kfar Monash were killed by militants while on patrol south of Hebron. Hamas claimed responsibility for the attack.
- 26 January: During the night 25–26 January Israeli forces invaded the al-Zaytoun neighbourhood of Gaza City. Twelve Palestinians were killed, three were hit with shrapnel from an artillery shell and nine were shot dead. 17 workshops were blown up and 15 more were severely damaged.
- 31 January: 13 Palestinians and over 50 wounded as the IDF made its deepest incursion in Gaza City in years. Scores of buildings was raided and 13 factories blown up, many of them used to manufacture weapons.

== February ==
- 6 February: Amir Ben-Aryeh, 21, of Maccabim, and St.-Sgt. Idan Suzin, 20, of Kiryat Tivon were killed and two more soldiers were wounded in a shooting attack in the area of Nablus. Both gunmen were killed by return fire from IDF troops. The PFLP and Fatah-Tanzim claimed responsibility for the attack.
- 11 February: Maj. Shahar Shmul, 24, of Jerusalem was killed by a Palestinian sniper near the Church of the Nativity in Bethlehem while checking a suspicious vehicle. The PFLP and the Islamic Jihad claimed responsibility for the attack.
- 14 February: An Israeli Merkava III heavy tank was destroyed by a mine near Dugit and Beit Lahiya, killing 4 soldiers. Hamas claimed responsibility.
- 23 February: Sgt. Doron Lev, 19, of Holon was shot and killed when a Palestinian sniper opened fire at an army position in the southern Gaza Strip. The PFLP claimed responsibility for the attack.

== March ==
- 5 March: Haifa bus 37 massacre – 17 killed, and about 53 injured in a suicide bombing on a bus in Haifa. Many of the fatalities were children returning home from school. The attack was conducted by Hamas.
- 7 March: Rabbi Eli Horowitz and his wife Dina from Kiryat Arba, were killed and five wounded by armed militants disguised as Jewish worshippers who infiltrated Kiryat Arba, entered their home and murdered them while they were celebrating the Sabbath. Hamas claimed responsibility for the attack.
- 10 March: Sgt. Tomer Ron, 20, of Moshav Moledet, was killed and four soldiers were wounded - one seriously - in Hebron, on the road between the Cave of the Patriarchs and Kiryat Arba, when Palestinian militants opened fire on a foot patrol. Two organizations - Hamas and Ahmed Jibril's Popular Front-General Command - claimed responsibility for the attack.
- 12 March: Sgt. Assaf Moshe Fuchs, 21, of Kibbutz Gvat was killed and another soldier wounded Wednesday morning in an exchange of fire with wanted militants from the Islamic Jihad in the West Bank village of Saida, near Tulkarm.
- 16 March: Rachel Corrie, an American member of the International Solidarity Movement in Rafah, was killed when she tried to obstruct an Israel Defense Forces bulldozer operating in a Palestinian residential area of Rafah.
- 18 March: Sgt.-Maj. (res.) Ami Cohen, 27, of Netanya was killed and another soldier wounded south of Bethlehem when Palestinians opened fire during a search for wanted militants.
- 19 March: A 51-year-old Israeli was shot dead while driving in his car between Mevo Dotan and Shaked in the West Bank). The Fatah al-Aqsa Martyrs Brigades claimed responsibility.

== April ==
- 8 April: Two Israeli combat helicopters, accompanied by an F-16 fighter jet, attacked a densely populated area of Gaza City. One helicopter launched two missiles against a car carrying Hamas leader Sa'id Arbid. Arbid and two other Hamas members were killed when the car exploded. Soon after a crowd of Palestinians gathered around the car, the helicopter fired a third missile and killed five more. In total seven Palestinians were killed and 53 more were wounded.
- 10 April: St.-Sgt. Yigal Lifshitz, 20, of Rishon Lezion, and St.-Sgt. Ofer Sharabi, 21, of Givat Shmuel were killed and nine others wounded when Palestinian militants opened fire before dawn on their base near Bekaot in the northern Jordan Valley. The PFLP and the al-Aqsa Martyrs Brigades claimed responsibility for the attack.
- 11 April: Tom Hurndall, a British member of the International Solidarity Movement, was shot by an IDF sniper in a crossfire after Palestinians fires an RPG at them. The sniper was sentenced to 8 years in prison for manslaughter. He died after almost a year in coma 13 January 2004.
- 13 April: Gabriel (Gabi) Pedatzur, 49, of Kochav Yair was killed by militants in the Ben Shemen forest.
- 15 April: An Israeli and a Palestinian were killed and four Israelis were wounded when a Palestinian militant opened fire at the Karni industrial zone crossing in the Gaza Strip. Hamas claimed responsibility for the attack. Additionally, Daniel Mandel, 24, of Alon Shvut was killed and another soldier was wounded in an exchange of gunfire during a search for wanted Hamas militants in Nablus.
- 20 April: IDF photographer Cpl. Lior Ziv, 19, of Holon, was killed and three other soldiers were wounded during an operation to destroy a Hamas smuggling tunnel in Rafah, in the Gaza Strip.
- 24 April: A 23-year-old Israeli security guard was killed and 13 were wounded in a suicide bombing outside the train station in Kfar Saba. Groups related to the Fatah al-Aqsa Martyrs Brigades and the PFLP claimed joint responsibility for the attack.
- 30 April: Three Israelis were killed, and about 60 injured when a British Muslim suicide bomber blows himself up outside Mike's Place bar on the Tel Aviv coast. A second would-be suicide bomber, also a British citizen, failed to explode and attempted to escape through the sea. His body was washed away to the shore a few days later. On 8 March 2004, Hamas claimed responsibility for the attack, and released a videotape showing an interview with the two suicide bombers.

== May ==
- 2 May: A British cameraman was shot dead by Israeli soldiers in Rafah.
- 4 May: The body of Tali Weinberg, 26, of Beit Aryeh, was discovered in a garage in Rosh Ha'ayin with numerous stab wounds. The suspect, Weinberg's boyfriend, arrested on June 11, a 21-year-old Arab resident of Kafr Qasem, is believed to have carried out the murder as part of a "loyalty test" administered by Palestinian terrorist organizations.
- 5 May: An Israeli was killed and two others (including the victim's 6-year-old daughter) were seriously wounded when militants fired shots at their vehicle near Shvut Rachel, in the northern West Bank. The Fatah al-Aqsa Martyrs' Brigades claimed responsibility for the attack.
- 11 May: A 53-year-old Israeli man was shot in the head and killed by Palestinians in a roadside ambush north of [Jerusalem]. Both Fatah and the Popular Front for the Liberation of Palestine claimed responsibility for the attack.
- 17 May: Gadi Levy and his wife Dina were killed by a suicide bomber in Hebron. Hamas claimed responsibility for the attack.
- 18 May: Palestinian suicide bomber kills seven, wounds 20 on bus in Jerusalem's French Hill district. Hamas claimed responsibility for the attack.
- 19 May: A suicide bomber blows herself up at the entrance to a mall in the northern Israeli town of Afula. Three people were killed and about 60 wounded. The Islamic Jihad and the Fatah al-Aqsa Martyrs Brigades both claimed responsibility for the attack.

== June ==
- 5 June: The bodies an Israeli adult and child were found near Hadassah Ein Kerem hospital in Jerusalem, brutally beaten and stabbed to death.
- 8 June: Haviv Dadon, 16, of Shlomi was killed and four other Israelis wounded in a Hizbullah rocket attack. Four soldiers were killed and four reserve soldiers were wounded when Palestinian militants wearing IDF uniforms opened fire on an IDF outpost near the Erez checkpoint and industrial zone in the Gaza Strip. Three militants were killed by IDF soldiers. The Fatah Al-Aqsa Martyrs Brigades, Hamas and the Islamic Jihad issued a joint statement claiming responsibility for the attack. Sgt. Matan Gadri, 21, of Moshav Moledet was killed in Hebron while pursuing two Palestinian gunmen who earlier had wounded a Border Policeman on guard at the Tomb of the Patriarchs. The two militants were killed.
- 11 June: 17 people were killed and over 100 wounded when a suicide bomber attacked a #14A bus in downtown Jerusalem. Hamas claimed responsibility.
- 12 June: A 51-year-old Israeli was found fatally shot in his car in the West Bank. The Fatah al-Aqsa Martyrs Brigades claimed responsibility for the attack.
- 13 June: Sgt. Mordechai Sayada, 22, of Tirat Carmel, was shot to death in Jenin by a Palestinian sniper as his jeep patrol passed by. The Fatah al-Aqsa Martyrs Brigades claimed responsibility for the attack.
- 17 June: An Israeli 7-year-old girl was killed and three of her family members (including her younger sister) wounded when Palestinians, armed with assault rifles, attacked the car they were travelling in, on road no. 6, some few hundreds meters far from Qalqiliya. The Al-Aqsa Martyrs' Brigades claimed responsibility.
- 19 June: An Israeli shopkeeper was killed in Sdei-Trumot (a village in northern Israel), when a Palestinian suicide bomber blew himself up inside the shop. The Islamic Jihad claimed responsibility for the attack.
- 20 June: A 47-year-old Israeli was killed when his car was fired upon in an ambush by Palestinians north of Ramallah. His parents, US citizens, were seriously wounded and his wife lightly injured. Hamas claimed responsibility for the attack.
- 26 June: An Israeli phone company employee was killed in a shooting attack by a Palestinian teenager in the Israeli Arab town of Baka al-Garbiyeh. The Fatah al-Aqsa Martyrs Brigades claimed responsibility for the attack.
- 30 June: A 46-year-old Bulgarian construction worker was killed in a shooting attack on a road west of Jenin, while driving a truck. The Fatah Al-Aqsa Martyrs Brigades claimed responsibility for the attack, in opposition to the declared ceasefire.

== July ==
- 7 July: A 65-year-old Israeli woman was killed in her home in Moshav Kfar Yavetz and three of her grandchildren lightly wounded in a suicide bombing. The Islamic Jihad claimed responsibility for the attack.
- 15 July: A 24-year-old Israeli was stabbed to death while protecting his girlfriend against a Palestinian armed with a long-bladed knife on Tel Aviv's beach-front promenade. The militant, who was shot and apprehended, was a member of the Fatah Al-Aqsa Martyrs Brigades, which claimed responsibility for the attack.
- 21 July: The body of IDF soldier Cpl. Oleg Shaichat, 20, of Upper Nazareth, abducted and murdered on July 21 while on his way home, was found on July 28, buried in an olive grove near Kafr Kana, an Arab village in the Lower Galilee.

== August ==
- 8 August: Third Petty Officer Roi Oren, 20, an Israel Navy commando, was fatally shot in an assault on a Hamas bomb factory in Nablus.
- 12 August: A 43-year-old Israeli was killed by a teenage Palestinian suicide bomber attack on a Rosh HaAyin supermarket.
- 12 August: Two Israelis were killed by a teenage Palestinian suicide bomber attack at a bus stop outside Ariel.
- 19 August: Jerusalem bus 2 massacre – 23 killed and 136 injured by a Palestinian suicide bomber attack on a bus in Jerusalem. Among the victims were several children. The Palestinian Islamic Jihad in Hebron, and Hamas claimed responsibility for the attack.
- 29 August: A 25-year-old Israeli was fatally shot in an attack while driving north-east of Ramallah. His wife who was seven months pregnant, sustained moderate injuries, and gave birth to a baby girl by Caesarean section. The Fatah al-Aqsa Brigades claimed responsibility for the attack.

== September ==
- 4 September: Sgt. Gabriel Uziel, 20, of Givat Ze'ev was shot and mortally wounded by a militant sniper in Jenin; he died en route to the hospital. The Fatah al-Aqsa Martyrs Brigades and the Islamic Jihad claimed responsibility for the attack.
- 5 September: 2nd Petty Officer Ra'anan Komemi, 23, of Moshav Aminadav, from the Naval Commandos was killed in a clash with armed Palestinians in Nablus. A senior Hamas bomb-maker, believed to have orchestrated several fatal suicide bombings, was also killed in the clash. Four soldiers were wounded, one seriously.
- 9 September: Nine non-combat soldiers were killed and over 30 wound when a suicide bomber exploded in a bus stop near Asaf-Ha-Rofe hospital and the military base of Tzrifin. Hamas claimed responsibility.
- 9 September: Seven people were killed and over 50 wounded when a suicide bomber exploded at the Café Hillel in Jerusalem. Hamas claimed responsibility.
- 25 September: St.-Sgt. Avihu Keinan, 22, of Shilo was killed and six soldiers wounded in an IDF operation to arrest wanted Islamic Jihad and Hamas militants in the El Boureij refugee camp in the southern Gaza Strip.
- 26 September: A 7-month-old baby girl and a 29-year-old man were killed, and both of the baby's parents were wounded, when a Palestinian gunman entered their home in Negohot (in the West Bank) and opened fire during the family's celebration of the Jewish New Year.

== October ==
- 4 October: Maxim restaurant suicide bombing – 21 people were killed and 64 wounded when the female suicide bomber Hanadi Jaradat explodes in the Jewish-Arab Maxim restaurant in Haifa. Four of the victims were children, including a 2-month-old. The Islamic Jihad group claimed responsibility for the suicide-massacre. The suicide bombing attack came just a day before Yom Kippur.
- 15 October: Three American diplomatic personnel - John Eric Branchizio, 37, of Texas, John Martin Linde, Jr., 30, of Missouri, and Mark T. Parson, 31, of New York, were killed and one was wounded at the Beit Hanoun junction in the Gaza Strip when a massive bomb demolished an armor-plated jeep in a convoy carrying U.S. diplomats.
- 19 October: Three Israeli soldiers were killed and two more were injured after a roadside ambush near Ein-Yabrud village, south of Ofra on the West Bank.
- 20 October: The Israeli air force launched five attacks in Gaza, killing 14 people and wounding 100.
- 24 October: Two female soldiers and one male soldier were killed after two militants infiltrated into the military court inside Netzarim settlement on the Gaza Strip. Three more soldier were wounded.

== November ==
- 18 November: Two soldiers were killed by a Palestinian gunman in a checkpoint near Bethlehem.
- 19 November: Four people were injured and one woman was killed, when an Arab militant, Ahmed Jahid, opened fire on a group of tourist in Rabin border crossing between the Arava (Israel) and Aqaba (Jordan). The militant was killed by Israeli security guards and it is believed he was sent by Al-Qaeda.
- 22 November: Two Israeli civilian security guards were killed in a construction site near Nahal Kidron at the outskirts of Jerusalem. The Al-Aqsa Martyrs' Brigades claimed responsibility.
- 26 November: Three Palestinian civilians riding in a car on the Gaza Strip were killed by Israeli soldiers.

== December ==
- 3 December: The Israeli security forces captured two militants on their way to commit a massacre in Yokneam Illit school. The two were members of the Palestinian security apparatus and were armed with a 10 kg explosive belt.
- 22 December: Capt. Hagai Bibi, 24, of Maaleh Adumim, and Capt. Leonardo (Alex) Weissman, 23, of Afula were killed when a Palestinian militant opened fire and threw hand grenades as they emerged from their jeep on the Kissufim-Gush Katif road in the Gaza Strip. The Fatah al-Aqsa Martyrs Brigades claimed responsibility for the attack.
- 25 December: 4 Israelis were killed as a 17-year-old suicide bomber blew himself up in a bus station on a main road between Tel Aviv and Petah Tikva. The PFLP claimed responsibility.

== See also ==
- Second Intifada
- Timeline of the Israeli Palestinian Conflict 2002
- Timeline of the Israeli Palestinian Conflict 2004
- 2003 in Israel
- 2003 in the Palestinian territories
- List of Palestinian rocket attacks on Israel in 2002–2006
- Timeline of the Israeli–Palestinian conflict
