= 2002 Metzer attack =

Terrorist attack during the Second Intifada

- Part of the Second Intifada
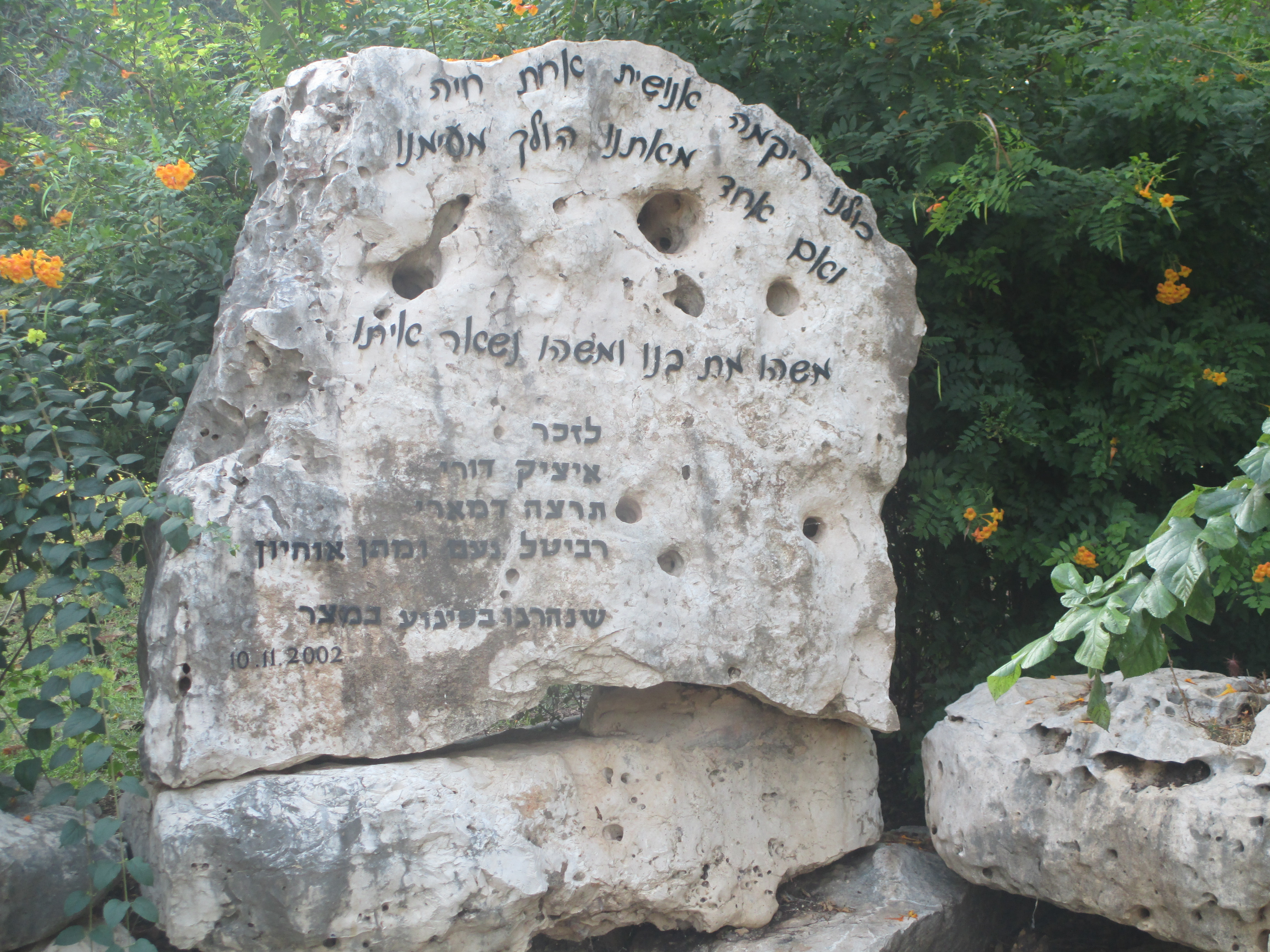
- Memorial for the attack victims, located in Metzer.

- The attack site
- Native name: הפיגוע במצר
- Location: 32°26′24″N 35°02′51″E; Kibbutz Metzer, Israel
- Date: 10 November 2002; 23 years ago c. 23:30 pm (UTC+2)
- Attack type: Mass shooting
- Weapon: M16 rifle
- Deaths: 5 civilians
- Perpetrator: al-Aqsa Martyrs' Brigades

The 2002 Metzer attack was a terrorist attack on Israeli civilians in Kibbutz Metzer, Israel that took place on 10 November 2002, during the Second Intifada. The victims included a family, Revital Ohayoun, the mother, and her two children, Matan, 5, and Noam, 4. Two other adults were killed by the assailant, including Tirza Damari, and Yitzhak Drori.

Muhammad Naifeh, a commander in Fatah’s Al-Aqsa Martyrs Brigades, was arrested for having masterminded the attack and sentenced to 13 life sentences in Gilboa Prison for various terror attacks and shootings. Sirhan Sirhan, a Fatah terrorist was the assailant. He was killed in October 2003, while being pursued in his car in a joint operation by the Israel Defense Forces, Shin Bet and the Yamam.

The attack resonated deeply with the Israeli public, particularly the murders of the family. The attack was harshly condemned by the United Nations and Israeli government.

== Background ==
Kibbutz Metzer has long been considered a bastion of the Israeli left and its peace movement. The kibbutz and surrounding areas had established a reputation for warm Arab-Jewish relations, cultivated over the decades. As a result, the kibbutz was surrounded by only an ordinary wire fence.

In October 2001, St.-Sgt. Yaniv Levy, a soldier in the Combat Engineering Brigade was murdered at close range by terrorists at the Kibbutz Metzer junction. Fatah's Tanzim claimed responsibility for the attack. One of the perpetrators, Mansour Shreim, also planned the 2002 Hadera attack. He was sentenced to 14 life sentences and was released in 2025. In 2025, he was released as part of a prisoner-hostage swap amid the Gaza War hostage crisis.

Hours before the attack, police official had foiled a suicide bombing near the kibbutz. Border police suspected an infiltration into the kibbutz and spotted a vehicle with two Palestinian passengers. The driver defied orders to stop and the car subsequently exploded, caused by an explosive belt worn by one passenger and a bomb carried by the other.

The kibbutz lies within a narrow 10-mile corridor between the West Bank and the Mediterranean. Weeks before the attack, the corridor was the scene of the Karkur junction suicide bombing, killing 14 bus passengers.

In June 2002, Muhammad Naifeh, the mastermind of the Metzer attack caused issues for Yasser Arafat with Americans involved in the peace process. Days after the 2002 French Hill suicide bombing, Arafat met with Naifeh in Jerusalem and gave him an envelope with $20,000 for Tanzim activity. The Israelis reported the meeting to the Americans, as well as Naifeh's involvement in the French Hill attack. This led to President George W. Bush distancing himself from Arafat and called for Palestinians to replace Arafat as their leader.

== Attack ==
Palestinian terrorist Sirhan Sirhan infiltrated kibbutz Metzer before midnight on 10 November 2002. He opened fire on residents near the dining room and was spotted by a local couple hiding in the bushes. The couple became separated, and Tirza Damari stumbled over a pipe before being shot dead by the gunman. Her partner escaped. Revital Ohayon was awakened by the gunfire and turned on the lights in her home and rushed to the bedroom of her two young children, Matan, 5, and Noam, 4. Sirhan noticed the lights and broke into her home. There he killed the mother and children. Yitzhak "Itzik" Dori, the kibbutz secretary was on guard duty and drove up to the Ohayon home, having heard gunfire from there. He was shot dead by the gunman. Sirhan was chased away by an armed member of the kibbutz.

The Al Aqsa Martyrs Brigades claimed responsibility for the attack.

== Victims ==
The attacker murdered filmmaker Revital Ohayoun, 34, and her two young children (Matan, 5, and Noam, 4), who were killed in their beds. Their mother was slain while died while attempting to block the gunman in the bedroom doorway. The family had only settled in the kibbutz three months earlier, with Ohayoun believing it would be a good community in which to raise her family.

Additionally, Tirza Damari, 42, and Yitzhak Drori, 44, the kibbutz secretary, were shot while responding to the gunfire. Thousands of Israelis attended the funeral of Dori, with a significant number coming from other kibbutzim in Israel.

== Perpetrators ==
Muhammad Naifeh, a commander in Fatah’s Al-Aqsa Martyrs Brigades, was arrested for having masterminded the attack and sentenced to 13 life sentences in Gilboa Prison. In 2025, he was released as part of a prisoner-hostage swap amid the Gaza War hostage crisis.

Sirhan Sirhan (Arabic: سرحان سرحان, died 2003) was identified as the assailant. He was reportedly a member of the Tanzim, an armed wing of Fatah. Despite initial claims to the contrary, he was not related to Sirhan Sirhan, the Palestinian American Christian who assassinated United States Senator Robert F. Kennedy in 1968.His house was demolished on December 19, 2002, by the Israel Defense Forces (IDF). On October 3, 2003, Sirhan was killed by the Yamam, an Israel Border Police counter-terrorism unit, during an attempt to arrest him.

== Reactions ==
Laura King, then global affairs correspondent for the Los Angeles Times wrote that the attack had strong traction among the Israeli public:

"In both Israel and the Palestinian territories, more than 25 months of bloodletting has diminished the shock effect of even the most violent deaths.

But the killings at the kibbutz struck a chord across Israel.

Television viewers witnessed a wrenching display of grief by Avi Ohayon, father of Noam and Matan, boys of 4 and 5 who were shot dead as they tried to hide under their covers."

Prime Minister, Ariel Sharon visited the kibbutz in the wake of the attack, promising justice: “What we saw here today is yet another example of the people we are confronting,”

Kofi Annan, then-Secretary-General of the United Nations condemned the attack in a statement, saying that he was appalled by the murders.

Yasser Arafat stated that he intended to appoint a committee to investigate the attack.

Kibbutz residents expressed their belief that the community had been targeted for its commitment to coexistence between Arabs and Jews. Dov Avital, chief economist of the kibbutz said: "We were targeted because of our belief. They wanted to show there is no such thing as coexistence. They think Palestinians should fight Jews. If they kill our dream, our vision of life, then they will have succeeded."

Martin Schupak, one of the founders of the kibbutz, who came from Argentina, said: "But at least we could still say that a kibbutz is a paradise for children. Now it's a paradise where they kill children."

Tahhir Arda led an Arab delegation from the neighbouring village of Meiser to express condolences for the attack: "We are one family, Metzer and Meiser,".

== See also ==
- 2011 Itamar attack
- Palestinian political violence
- Timeline of the Israeli–Palestinian conflict in 2002
