= Timeline of the Israeli–Palestinian conflict in 2004 =

Israeli-Palestinian conflict timeline

- Timeline of the Israeli–Palestinian conflict
- 2003; 2004; 2005

This page is a partial listing of incidents of violence in the Israeli-Palestinian conflict in 2004.

== January ==
- January 3: Israeli soldiers kill three Palestinians: one with a pistol, one lighting a Molotov cocktail, and one throwing rocks in Nablus in the West Bank. The stone thrower was a 15-year-old boy. Later, during the funeral service for the three dead, another Palestinian was shot dead after drawing his pistol. Three others were wounded.
- January 13: A father of five was shot dead and three Israelis were injured in a roadside ambush by the Fatah's Al Aqsa Martyrs' Brigades.
- January 14: Four Israelis were killed at Erez crossing after a suicide bomber exploded herself in a checkpoint to the industrial zone of Erez. Hamas and the Al-Aqsa Martyrs' Brigades claimed joint responsibility.
- January 28: Israeli forces entered the Alzaytoun area south of Gaza City, killing eight Palestinians, five of whom were armed members of the Palestinian Islamic Jihad, and wounding dozens .
- January 29: 2004 Jerusalem bus 19 bombing – Eleven Israelis killed and 50 wounded in a suicide bombing of a city bus in Jerusalem. The Al-Aqsa Martyrs' Brigades claimed responsibility. Hamas also claimed responsibility the next day. The Israeli Ministry of Foreign Affairs released a video documenting the sights that police forensic expert encountered at the scene. (contains graphic content).
- January 30: Three armed Palestinians were killed in gun fights with IDF forces. Two were killed while carrying explosives near Dugit. The third died in a gunfight at Bethlehem.

== February ==
- February 2: Yasser Abu al-Aesh, an alleged local leader of Islamic Jihad, was among four militants killed during an Israeli raid in the Rafah refugee camp in the Gaza Strip. The house where the men had been staying was later destroyed.

On 2 February 2004, Israeli Prime Minister Ariel Sharon announced his plan to transfer all the Jewish settlers from the Gaza Strip. The Israeli opposition dismissed his announcement as "media spin" but the Israeli Labour Party said it would support such a move. Sharon's right-wing coalition partners National Religious Party and National Union rejected the plan and vowed to quit the government if it were implemented.

- February 11: Twelve Palestinian militants and civilians were killed in clashes with Israeli forces in al-Shojaeya neighbourhood in Gaza city. In Rafah refugee camp one Palestinian civilian was killed by Israeli sniper fire. During the day more than 50 Palestinians were wounded, 23 of them children.
- February 22: Eight Israelis killed and 60 wounded in a suicide bombing of a city bus (14A) in Jerusalem, occurring one day before the start of hearings at the International Court of Justice regarding the Israeli West Bank barrier. The Al-Aqsa Martyrs' Brigades claimed responsibility.
- February 26: Sgt.-Maj.(res.) Amir Zimmerman, 25, of Kfar Monash was killed and two other soldiers wounded when two Palestinian guerrillas opened fire near the Erez Crossing between the Gaza Strip and Israel. The guerrillas were killed by IDF forces. The Fatah Al-Aqsa Martyrs Brigades claimed responsibility for the attack.
- February 27: An Israeli couple (parents of a 2-year-old girl) were shot dead in their car on their way home, in the northern Negev. After firing at the car from a distance, causing the driver to lose control, the terrorists approached the car and shot the couple at point-blank range. Altogether, over 40 bullets were used. Yasser Arafat's Fatah's Al-Aqsa Martyrs' Brigades claimed responsibility for the attack.,
- February 28: Mahmud Jhouda, head of Islamic Jihad's "military wing" in Gaza was killed together with another Islamic Jihad member and a relative of his, when the car in which the three were driving was targeted by an Israeli helicopter.

== March ==
- March 3: Three Hamas militants were killed in the Gaza Strip when their car was targeted by an Israeli helicopter. Hamas said the three were on "a jihad mission".
- March 13: Two Palestinians were killed by Israeli soldiers near the Karni border crossing in Gaza.
- March 14: Near-simultaneous attacks by two Palestinian suicide bombers kill 10 and wound 12 in the Israeli port of Ashdod. Hamas and Al-Aqsa Martyrs' Brigades claim joint responsibility.
- March 18: Four Palestinians, two militants and two children, die in two Israeli air strikes on Rafah refugee camp in Gaza. Several more are wounded.
- March 19: An Israeli man, George Elias Khouri, is shot dead from a passing vehicle while jogging in the French Hill neighborhood of Jerusalem. Al-Aqsa Martyrs' Brigades claim the attack, and later apologize when it becomes known that the victim was George Khouri, a Christian Arab.
- March 22: Ahmed Yassin, leader of Hamas, and six Palestinian bystanders are killed by an Israeli missile from a helicopter gunship.

== April ==
- April 3: Yaakov Zagha, a 40-year father of six, is shot dead outside his house after his daughter Chana, 14, was wounded by a Palestinian from nearby Tul Karem. The shooter was later killed by IDF forces. Hamas claimed responsibility.
- April 7: A demonstration of Palestinians and international activists against the West Bank wall was fired upon by Israeli soldiers. Twenty people were injured, none seriously.
- April 17: Israeli border policeman Kfir Ohaiyon, 20, of Eilat was killed and three other Israelis injured in a suicide bombing at the Erez Crossing in northern Gaza. Hamas and Fatah claimed joint responsibility for the attack.
- April 25: Border Policeman Cpl. Yaniv Mashiah, 20, of Jaffa, was killed and three others lightly wounded just an hour after the beginning of Memorial Day for Israel's fallen soldiers, when shots were fired at their vehicle near Hebron. The Al-Aqsa Martyrs Brigades claimed responsibility for the attack.

== May ==
- May 2: Tali Hatuel, a 34-year-old Israeli woman who was eight months pregnant, and her four daughters – Hila (11), Hadar (9), Roni (7) and Meirav (2) – were shot to death in the Gaza Strip, near the Kissufim checkpoint. Three other Israelis were wounded. The Popular Resistance Committees and Islamic Jihad claimed responsibility.
- May 11: Six IDF soldiers were killed during an IDF operation to target Qassam rocket workshops in Gaza City, when an armored personnel carrier was struck by an explosive device planted by Palestinian militants. Hamas and the Islamic Jihad claimed responsibility for the attack. The soldiers killed: Sgt. Adaron Amar, 20, of Eilat; Sgt. Aviad Deri, 21, of Ma'aleh Adumim; Staff-Sgt. Ofer Jerbi, 21, of Moshav Ben-Zakai; Staff-Sgt. Ya'akov (Zelco) Marviza, 25, of Kibbutz HaMa'apil; Sgt. Kobi Mizrahi, 20, of Moshav Mata; and Staff-Sgt. Eitan Newman, 21, of Jerusalem.
- May 12: An IDF officer and four soldiers were killed, and three IDF soldiers were lightly injured, while preparing to detonate a weapon-smuggling tunnel on the Philadelphi Route near the Israeli-Egyptian border near Rafah. Their armored personnel carrier exploded, apparently after being hit by an RPG anti-tank rocket. The Islamic Jihad claimed responsibility for the attack. The soldiers killed: Cpl. Elad Cohen, 20, of Jerusalem; Sgt.-Maj. Aiman Ghadir, 24, of Bir Makhsur; Capt. Aviv Hakani, 23, of Ashdod; Sgt. Za'ur (Zohar) Smelev, 19, of Ofakim; and Sgt. Lior Vishinski, 20, of Ramat Gan.
- May 14: Staff-Sergeant Rotem Adam, 21, Rishon LeZion and Sergeant Alexei Hayat, 21, of Beer Sheva were killed and two soldiers moderately wounded by Palestinian sniper fire in the Rafah refugee camp in the southern Gaza Strip.
- May 18: In response to previous attack on Israeli troops at the Gaza Strip, the IDF launches Operation Rainbow (2004) with a stated aim of striking the terror infrastructure of Rafah, destroying smuggling tunnels, and stopping a shipment of SA-7 missiles and improved anti-tank weapons. The operation ended after the IDF killed 40 Palestinian militants and 12 civilians and demolished about 45–56 structures. The great destruction and killing of 10 protesters led to a worldwide outcry against the operation.
- May 29: Major Shachar Ben-Yishai, 25, of Menahemia was killed by Palestinian gunfire following a search in the Balata camp near Nablus. The Fatah Al-Aqsa Martyrs Brigades claimed responsibility for the attack.

== June ==
- June 21: Weerachai Wongput, 37, from the Nong Han District of the northeastern province of Udon Thani in Thailand, died after being hit by shrapnel from a mortar fired into greenhouses in Kfar Darom in the Gaza Strip. The mortar was fired by Palestinians trying to divert attention from an attempt to infiltrate the settlement. Hamas claimed responsibility for the attack.
- June 27: Staff-Sergeant Ro'i Nissim, 20, from Rishon LeTzion, was killed and five others were injured when a tunnel laden with more than 1000 kg of explosives detonated under IDF outpost of the "Urhan" junction near Gush Katif in the Gaza Strip. Hamas and al-Aqsa Martyrs' Brigades claimed responsibility.
- June 28: Four-year-old Afik Zahavi, and Mordehai Yosefof, 49, were killed in Sderot by a Palestinian Qassam rocket that hit a kindergarten, the first fatal Qassam attack. The boy's mother, Ruthie Zahavi, 28, was critically wounded. Hamas claimed responsibility.
- June 29: Moshe Yohai, 63, from Ashdod, an Israeli truck driver, was shot dead near Ramallah. The al-Aqsa Martyrs' Brigades claimed responsibility.

== July ==
- July 4: Victor Kreiderman, 49, was killed and his wife, Emma, wounded, in a shooting attack between Mevo Dotan and Shaked. The al-Aqsa Martyrs' Brigades claimed responsibility. The militant fled to the nearby Arab village of Yabed.
- July 6: Captain Moran Vardi, 25, of Shayetet-13 was killed during a battle with two militants barricaded in a house in Nablus. In that battle four Palestinians were killed, two of them were PFLP militants.
- July 11: A remote-control bomb killed Sgt. Ma'ayan Naim, 19 and wounded 34 others, in a bus station in Har-Zion Boulevard in Tel Aviv. Yasser Arafat's al-Aqsa Martyrs' Brigades claim responsibility. Israeli prime-minister Ariel Sharon said that: "Today's fatality [in the Tel Aviv bombing] was the first act of murder perpetrated under the protective wing of the Hague ruling". ,

== August ==
- August 2: A Qassam rocket hits Sderot and damages a house, causing blast injuries to three people.
- August 11: Two people were killed and 16 wounded when an explosive device was detonated by Palestinian militants inside an Arab taxi as it attempted to cross the Qalandia checkpoint just north of Jerusalem. Two Palestinians were killed, and about 20 people, the majority of them Arabs, were wounded. The al-Aqsa Martyrs' Brigades faction of Fatah claimed responsibility and expresses regret that Arabs were among the dead and wounded.
- August 13: Shlomo Miller, 50, father of seven children, was shot dead and another person wounded in an ambush near Itamar. The gunman was killed by Israeli security forces and was identified as an officer in Yasser Arafat's Preventative Security Force. Fatah claimed responsibility.
- August 15: A MAGAV policeman was slashed with a knife across the neck by an Arab from Shuafat, in the Old City of Jerusalem. The officer managed to kill the attacker, but was seriously wounded and underwent emergency surgery.
- August 20: Nail Khalil Abu Ghulah, reported to suffer a psychological disorder, was shot dead by Israeli soldiers east of Wadi Gaza village while climbing the fence of an Israeli community.
- August 27: An IDF Combat Engineering force rescues three Israelis from lynching by Arabs in the Qalandia refugee camp. A Palestinian mob attacked the Israelis, stoned them, beat them and tried to set their truck on fire. The Israelis were wounded and after rescue were treated at Hadassah Ein Kerem hospital in Jerusalem.
- August 30: An Israeli civilian was wounded by gunfire directed towards an IDF position near Khan Yunis. He was evacuated to Barzilai Hospital in Ashkelon.
- August 31: Two Palestinian suicide bombers kill 16 Israelis and wound more than 94 others aboard two city buses in Beer Sheva. Among the dead is four-year-old Avial Atash. Hamas claims responsibility. The victims, all residents of Beersheba: Shoshana Amos, 64; Aviel Atash, 3; Vitaly Brodsky, 52; Tamara Dibrashvilli, 70; Raisa Forer, 55; Larisa Gomanenko, 48; Denise Hadad, 50; Tatiana Kortchenko, 49; Rosita Lehman, 45; Karine Malka, 23; Nargiz Ostrovsky, 54; Maria Sokolov, 57; Roman Sokolovsky, 53; Tekele Tiroyaient, 33; Eliyahu Uzan, 58; Emmanuel Yosef (Yosefov), 28. ,

== September ==
- September 3: Two Arabs transporting a bomb are hit by Israeli gunfire causing the bomb to explode. Both Arabs die.
- September 7: A 60-year-old jogger is wounded by shrapnel from a Qassam rocket fired at Sderot.
- September 7: Fourteen Hamas militants are killed and 40 wounded in an Israeli airstrike on their training camp. ,
- September 8: A car bomb explodes near a MAGAV road block in Baqa al-Sharkiya, managing to kill only its driver. The Fatah's al-Aqsa Martyrs' Brigades claimed responsibility.
- September 8: An Arab fugitive was killed and two others wounded in Jericho during a shootout with Israeli soldiers trying to arrest them.
- September 10: Abdel Aziz Ashkar, 34, a Hamas leader was killed by Israeli forces.
- September 13: Three senior militants belonging to the Fatah Al-Aqsa Martyrs Brigades were killed in an Israeli targeted killing in Jenin.,
- September 15: Nine Palestinian militants and a child were killed in two IDF operations in Nablus and Jenin. In Nablus, Shayetet-13 killed four Fatah militants, and one from Islamic Jihad. A child was killed in the crossfire. In Jenin, four wanted Fatah militants were killed by undercover Border Police troops. Two female suicide bombers turned themselves in to IDF forces following the death of their handler Hanni Aqad. ,
- September 20: Senior Hamas commander in Gaza Khaled Abu Shamiyah was killed by Israeli forces.,
- September 20: Two Hamas members, Rabah Zakut and Nabil al-Saidi, while on their way to launch Qassam rockets into Israel, were killed by Israeli forces in the Rimal neighborhood of Gaza.
- September 22: A female suicide bomber killed herself, wounding some 15 people and killing Momoya Tahio, 20, from Rehovot, and Menashe Komemi, 19, from Moshav Aminadav. Both were MAGAV officers who stopped her from approaching the nearby bus stop in the French Hill neighborhood of Jerusalem. The Fatah al-Aqsa Martyrs' Brigades claimed responsibility.
- September 23: A Qassam rocket attack on Sderot resulted in eight Israelis being treated at Barzalai Hospital in Ashkelon.
- September 23: Three militants were killed during an attack on the Israeli community of Morag.
- September 23: Three Israeli soldiers were killed defending the community of Morag, Captain Tal Bardugo, 22, from Jerusalem; St.-Sergeant Nir Sami, 21, from Jerusalem; St.-Sgt. Yisrael Lutati, 20, from N'vei Dekalim.
- September 24: Tif'eret Tretner, 24, an Israeli woman, is killed and another is wounded, on Friday morning when four mortar shells were fired at Neveh Dekalim, part of the Gush Katif bloc in the Gaza Strip.
- September 27: Two militants detected while placing a bomb near the Erez Crossing were shot and wounded by Israeli troops.
- September 29: Hamas member Tawfik Ali Charafi, and two or three others were killed.
- September 29: Three Qassam rockets hit Sderot, killing two-year-old Dorit Aniso and four-year-old Yuval Abebeh, and injuring 10–20 people. Militant group Hamas claimed responsibility. Israel launches Operation Days of Patience in response.
- September 30: Gilad Fischer, 22, from Hoshaiya, an Israeli soldier, was killed near Beit Hanoun.
- September 30: At least 24 Palestinians killed and dozens injured in wave of fighting. Seven of the dead were hit by Israeli tank fire in a crowded marketplace
- September 30: Shulamit Batito, 36, from Nisanit, an Israeli woman, was shot dead while jogging between Nisanit and Alei Sinai.
- September 30: Victor Ariel, 20, from Moshav Kadima, a medic, was killed while treating Shulamit Batito.
  - According to Haaretz, 97 Palestinians were killed during September 2004, 83 of whom were armed terrorists.

== October ==
- October 1, 2004: A Palestinian is killed and six are arrested, by IDF forces, in a Palestinian police office near the Erez crossing. An explosive belt and several rifles were captured in the same office. The seven planned to commit a combined suicide attack on the Erez crossing.
- October 2, 2004: Ten Palestinians are killed by IDF forces in another day of fighting in the Gaza Strip. Four terrorists were killed, during an infiltration attempt, 200 meters outside Kibbutz Nahal Oz in the Negev, while six others, Hamas members, were killed by the Israeli Air Force's targeted strikes.
- October 4: Two Israeli soldiers are wounded and six militants are killed, including a Hamas field commander, and two Arab civilians are killed during the sixth day of the Israeli incursion into the Jabaliya refugee camp. Two Qassam rockets are fired at the Israeli town of Sderot, injuring one Israeli.
- October 4: Ronen Ben-Meiri, 31, from Haifa, an Israeli undercover policeman was killed in a gunfight with Palestinian Authority Force 17 members in Ramallah. During the gunfight the three targeted Arabs were killed and two other wounded. Among the dead Arabs was Nadiv Sawahteh, wanted for his role in numerous terrorist shooting attacks.
- October 5: An Israeli Arab motorist is shot and wounded by occupants of a passing car while he was changing the tire of his vehicle on Route 60 near Gush Etzion.
- October 5: Bashir Dabash, a senior member Islamic Jihad in the Gaza Strip was killed by Israeli helicopter air-to-surface missiles fired at his vehicle. A second member of Islamic Jihad riding in the vehicle was killed as well. Also, on this day, Iman Darweesh Al Hams, a 13-year-old girl, was shot and killed in Rafah, Gaza Strip, by the IDF.
- October 6: Pratheep Nanongkham, 24, a greenhouse worker from Maha Sarakham province in Thailand, was killed when armed terrorists infiltrated the hothouse area of Kfar Darom in the central Gaza Strip. Hamas claimed responsibility for the attack.
- October 7: Three car bombs are detonated in Egyptian towns in the Sinai Peninsula frequented by Israeli tourists. The largest explosion, which killed at least 35 and wounding 114, was at a Hilton Taba in Taba, near the border with Israel. The other two explosions occurred at the towns of Ras al-Sultan and Nuweiba, killing two Israelis and four Egyptians. A group calling itself Jamayia al-Islamia al-Alamiya ("World Islamist Group") later claims responsibility and threatens further attacks. 13 of the victims were Israelis, 6 where Egyptians, 2 were Italians and 14 were from Russia and Eastern Europe.
- October 8: A Palestinian worker died from his wounds Friday morning following a Palestinian sniper attack on hothouse workers on the Rafah Yam settlement in the southern Gaza Strip.
- October 16: 2004 Israeli operation in the northern Gaza Strip is officially ended, with an estimated 130 Palestinian killed, of which 87 were armed combatants.
- October 18: six Palestinian militants are killed in failed attacks IDF forces. Two crossed the Israeli Gaza Strip barrier and killed by IDF patrol, two were killed in Kissufim junction and two were killed in Rafah, after trying to plant a bomb.
- October 19: Yair Turgeman, 22, is killed by sniper fire directed at the Menashe Battalion in northern Samaria. The al Aqsa Martyrs' Brigades, a faction of Palestinian Authority Chairman Yasser Arafat's Fatah, claimed responsibility.
- October 21: two Hamas militant were shot dead while trying to infiltrate Kibbutz Nahal Oz in the cover of morning fog.
- October 21: Moshe Elmaleh, 34, of Dimona, husband and father of three, soldier in the Israeli Engineering Corps was killed by a Hamas bomb blast along the Philadelphi Route.
- October 21: Hamas chief explosives engineer Adnal al-Ghoul and his deputy, Imad al-Baas, were killed and two others wounded by the Israel Air Force helicopter strike in Jabalia.
- October 28: IDF Sergeant Michael Chizik was killed by mortars fired at an army post near the Gaza settlement of Morag. Six other soldiers were injured in the attack, of them three suffered serious wounds.
- According to Haaretz 165 Palestinians were killed by IDF forces during October 2004, of whom only 50 were noncombatants (30.3%).

== November ==
- November 1: Three Israelis (Leah Levine aged 64, Shmuel Levy aged 65, and Tatiana Ackerman aged 34) were killed and 30 wounded when a 16-year-old child suicide bomber blow himself at the open air Carmel Market in Tel Aviv. The Popular Front for the Liberation of Palestine, a part of Yasser Arafat's PLO organization claims the bombing as theirs. Arafat's Palestinian Authority condemned the bombing.
- November 5: Two Palestinian children, Ahmad al-Sameiri (8) and his cousin Muhammad al-Sameiri (7), are killed by an explosion in the refugee camp of Khan Yonis in the Gaza Strip. Hospital officials say it was from a tank shell that hit a house. Israeli spokesmen said there had been no army fire in the area. They believe it was either caused when a Palestinian mortar misfired or by the detonation of a roadside bomb., ,
- November 6: Two militants were killed en route to attacking the Israeli community of Gadid. One Israeli soldier was wounded. Islamic Jihad confirms that the dead were theirs.
- November 6: Two Al-Aqsa Martyrs' Brigades militants are killed when their car bomb explodes prematurely in Qalqilya.
- November 7: Cpl. Tom Dekel (20), is killed during a military operation near Tulkarm, apparently by friendly fire.
- November 7: Four militants were killed after they opened fire upon IDF soldiers in Jenin. The four, Amin Abu-Qamil, Fadi Ajabriya, Muhmad Mashraqa and Muhmad Simi-Salah, include two from Fatah and two from Islamic Jihad.
- November 10: One militant was killed en route to the Israeli community of Dugit and an Israeli naval patrol.
- November 10: An Israeli child was wounded when the Israeli community of N'vei Dekalim was attacked with mortars. Five mortar bombs hit the community in two separate attacks.
- November 11: A Thai worker was wounded in a mortar attack on the Israeli community of Netzer-Hazani.
- November 11: al-Aqsa Martyrs Brigades attack Netzarim with bombs, mortar rounds, rocket propelled grenades and automatic weapons. Three Arabs are killed.
- November 13: A 26-year-old woman was injured by shrapnel from a bomb attack in eastern Gush Etzion. Fatah claims responsibility.
- November 25: Three Hamas operatives were killed and one was seriously injured during fights with IDF forces. In Hebron, Two Hamas seniors were killed and one was seriously wounded after the IDF demolished the house they were hiding in. In Rafah, one Hamas member was killed from a tank shell as the IDF uncovered a smuggling tunnel in a residential building.

== December ==
- December 7: Nadav Kudinski, an Israeli soldier from the K9 unit, and his dog were killed from a bomb hidden in a chicken coop covering a tunnel. In the ensuing battle two Hamas militants were killed. Later, two Islamic Jihad were killed.
- December 9: five weapon smugglers were killed and two were arrested in the border between Rafah and Egypt. Later that day, Jamal Abu Samhadana and two of his bodyguards were injured by a missile strike. Samhadana is believed to be responsible for the blast against an American diplomatic convoy in Gaza that killed three Americans.
- December 10: Following Hamas firing mortar rounds into the Neveh Dekalim settlement in the Gaza Strip and wounding four Israelis (including an 8-year-old boy), Israeli soldiers fired at the Khan Younis refugee camp (the origin of the mortars) killing a 7-year-old girl. An IDF source confirmed troops opened fire at Khan Younis, but said they aimed at Hamas mortar crews. The IDF insisted that it does its utmost to avoid civilian casualties.
- December 12: At least 5 Israeli soldiers from the Bedouin Scouts Battalion are killed and 10 are injured, as a tunnel rigged with 1500 kg of explosives, combined with two suicide bombers, exploded near the Rafah crossing between Rafah and Egypt. Hamas and al-Aqsa Martyrs' Brigades' offshoot called "Fatah Hawk" claimed joint responsibility. A Fatah gunmen was killed by IDF forces after he shot on the rescue unit soldiers.
- December 14: A Thai worker is killed and two more are injured in Gush Katif by Palestinian mortar shell.
- December 15: Five Israelis are injured, one critically, as Palestinian militants shoot on two cars near the Kissufim crossing in the Gaza Strip. IDF forces managed to kill one of the shooters. Islamic Jihad and Al-Aqsa Martyrs' Brigades claimed joint responsibility. ,
- December 15: In the West Bank, gunmen of the Al-Aqsa Martyrs Brigades shot dead 20-year-old Ibrahim Zeita, who they said had acted as an informant for Israel. His body was then dumped in a Ramallah square.
- December 16 and December 17: Israel launched Operation Orange Iron in Khan Yunis, in which IDF tanks and armored bulldozers entered the west part of the town to prevent mortar shellings. During the operation 11 Palestinians were killed, of who 8 armed militants and 3 civilian, and between 24 and 50 were injured. IDF said that two soldiers were lightly injured from an anti-tank missile.
- December 21: Ariela Fahima, 39, mother to four and resident of Moshav Nechusa, was found dead near her home. The Israeli Police said that this was an act of terror, committed by Palestinians from the nearby West Bank.
- December 22: Israeli civil security guard who guarded bulldozers used for building the Israeli West Bank barrier was killed in a shooting attack by two Palestinian militants.
- December 30: Ten Palestinians, of who 9 were armed, are killed in an Israeli army incursion into the Khan Younis refugee camp in the Gaza Strip. During the raid the local Hamas commander is killed and two Israeli soldiers are slightly wounded. The raid, codenamed "Purple Iron" was the third operation in Khan Yunis in response to constant mortars shelling on Israeli settlements. (BBC), (Haaretz),

== See also ==
- Media coverage of the Arab-Israeli conflict
- 2004 Israeli operation in the northern Gaza Strip
- 2004 Israeli operation in Rafah
