= Fadi Kafisha =

Fatah militia commander (d. 2006)

Fadi Kafisha (died August 31, 2006) was the head of the Tanzim in Nablus. Kafisha was responsible for organizing many suicide bombings and other attacks on Israelis and creating many explosive belts.

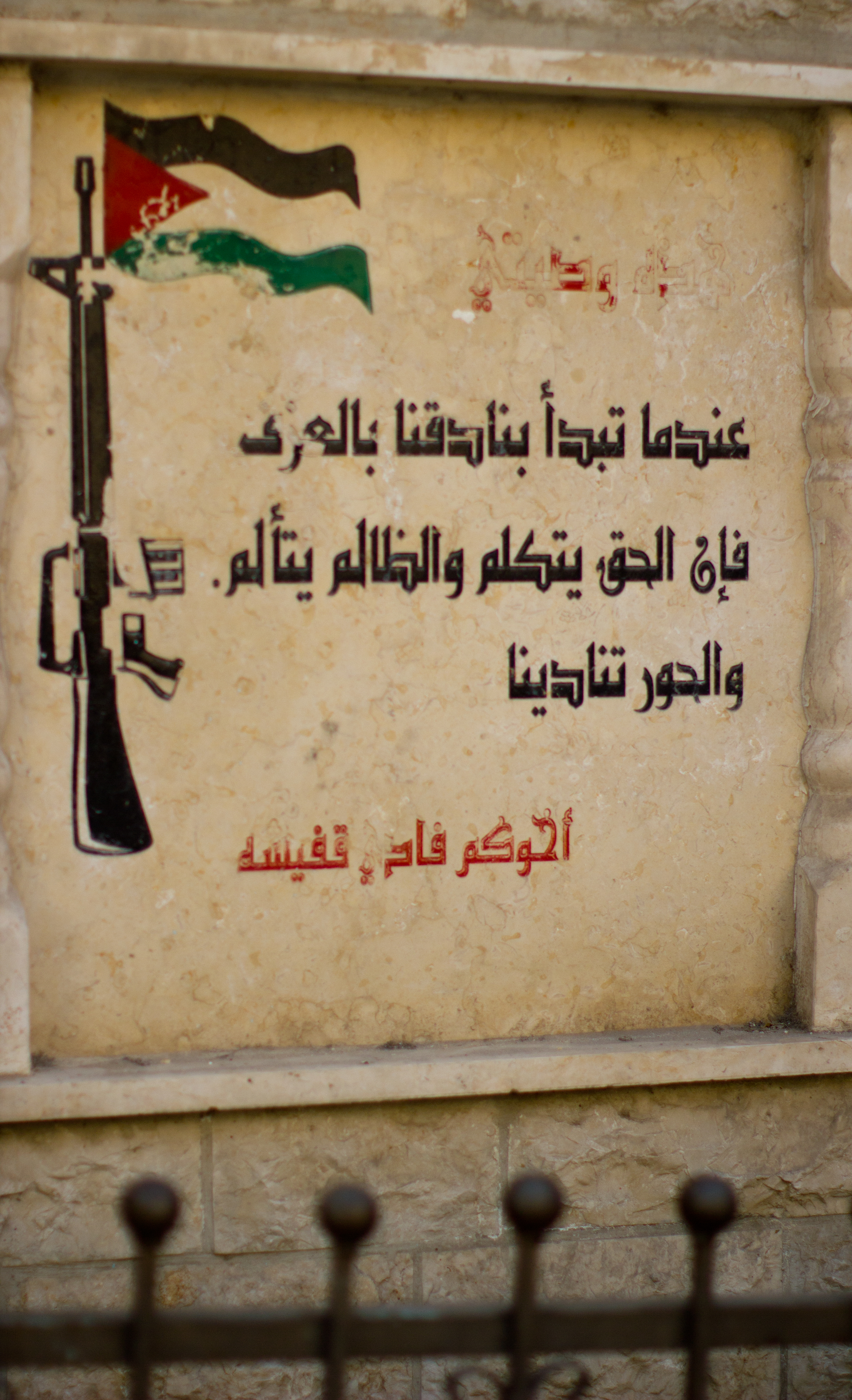
His memorial in Nablus

In 2004 Kafisha was wounded during a confrontation with IDF soldiers and his arm was amputated. His contact in Lebanon working for Hezbollah, Kais Ubaid, sent him an artificial arm from Germany. Apparently, Kafisha continued to lead the Nablus Al-Aqsa Martyrs' Brigades with this arm. During another attempt to capture Kafisha it is alleged he lost his eye. During the al-Aqsa Intifada Kafisha took the leading initiative in preparing terror attacks on Israelis, yet the military checkpoints surrounding Nablus denied most of them exit, and Kafisha's activities were frustrated. Though overshadowed by more publicity-friendly terrorists like Zakaria Zubeidi, Kafisha was instrumental in transforming Nablus into the "terror capital of the West Bank," and when he was killed the Brigades were already planning a wave of terror attacks against Israeli civil and military targets on the West Bank.

On July 17, 2006, a bomb attack in Nablus organized by Kafisha killed an Israeli soldier and wounded six others.

On August 31, 2006, Kafisha was killed during a random ambush by the Israeli 93rd "Haruv" battalion of the Kfir Brigade. The killing of Kafisha was unexpected, in that he had been in hiding for much of the past decade, and only later did the Israelis discover that they had killed the man described as the most-wanted man in the West Bank. Kafisha's status placed him only behind the leaders of Hamas's Izz ad-Din al-Qassam Brigades, Mohammed Deif and Ahmed al-Jabari of the Gaza Strip in terms of notoriety in the Israeli intelligence wanted lineup.
