= Ram Brustein =

Physics professor (b 1957)

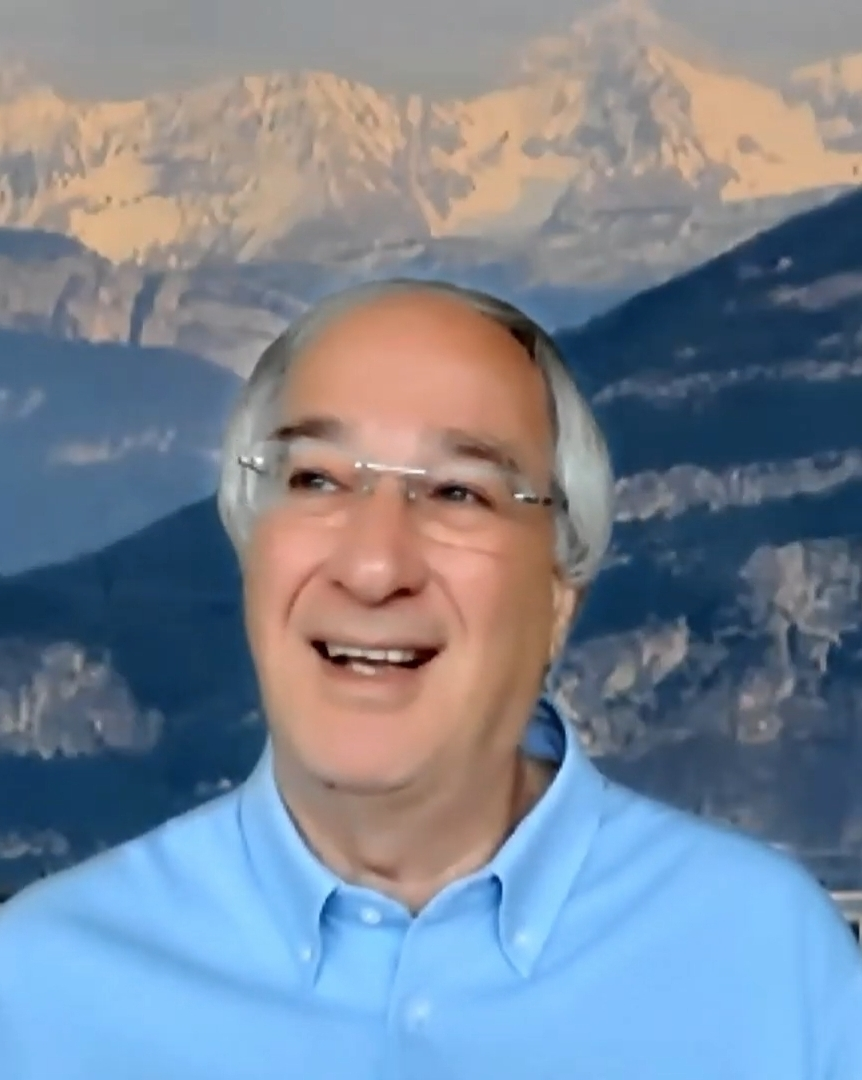
- Born: 1957 (age 68–69); Kibbutz Metzer
- Education: Tel Aviv University
- Scientific career
- Fields: Theoretical physics, Cosmology
- Workplaces: Ben Gurion University, CERN
- Thesis: String Propagation in Background Fields and Conformal Field Theories in Two Dimensions

Ram (Ramy) Brustein (Hebrew: רמי ברושטיין; born: 1957) is a Professor in the Department of Physics at Ben-Gurion University (BGU), Israel, where he holds the Albert Einstein Chair in Theoretical Physics.

His research focuses on theoretical physics and cosmology.

== Early life and education ==
Ramy Brustein was born in kibbutz Metzer, Israel. He began his academic studies in Physics and Mathematics at Tel Aviv University in 1978, and received his B.Sc. (with honors) in 1982, and M.Sc. (with honors) in 1984.

He continued his Ph.D. studies at Tel Aviv University until 1988. His thesis on "String Propagation in Background Fields and Conformal Field Theories in Two Dimensions" was supervised by Prof. Shimon Yankielowicz.

== Career ==
In 1988 Brustein was a postdoctoral research fellow in the University of Texas at Austin In the Weinberg theory group, and later at the University of Pennsylvania. Brustein became a fellow at CERN in 1993, and two years later he joined Ben-Gurion University as a Senior Lecturer. He became an associate professor in 2000, and was promoted to full professor of Physics in 2004.

Brustein also held several official positions at Ben Gurion University, including Dean of the Kreitman School of Advanced Graduate Studies, Senate Member and Chair of the Department of Physics.

== Research ==
Brustein's work examines the intersection of fundamental physics, early universe cosmology and black holes by applying Einstein's gravity and string theory to gravitational singularities.

In 1992, he showed that simple string models cannot sustain cosmological inflation, implying an alternative cosmic origin.

In 1995, he demonstrated that a pre-big bang phase would produce a detectable gravitational wave signal.

In 2019, he introduced the "frozen star" model, an ultracompact, nonsingular object without a horizon that reproduces a black hole's observable properties.

In 2000, he derived an entropy bound suggesting the big bang was preceded by a quantum phase.

== Awards and honors ==
Brustein received the Alon Fellowship from the Council for Higher Education in Israel in 1994. He was also a research fellow at CERN and at the Center for Advanced Studies, LMU Munich, and a short term member at the Institute for Advanced Study in Princeton. In 2016, he became the incumbent of the Albert Einstein Chair in Theoretical Physics.
