= Naif Abu-Sharah =

Fatah militia commander (1966–2004)

Naif Abu Sharah (1966 – 27 June 2004) (Arabic: نائف أبو شارة) was a Palestinian member of the al-Aqsa Martyrs' Brigades in Nablus, an armed wing of Fatah. He was killed in an Israel Defense Forces operation in the old city of Nablus in 2004 along with two other senior Palestinian militants.

== Biography ==
Born in 1966 Abu Sharab commanded the Fatah-linked al-Aqsa Martyrs Brigades Nablus. The group was very active in the Second Intifada, which began in 2000. Abu Sharab was allegedly one of the key players in Tanzim, another armed wing of Fatah.
