= Metzer =

Kibbutz in Haifa District, Israel

Metzer: מֶצֶר (Hebrew)
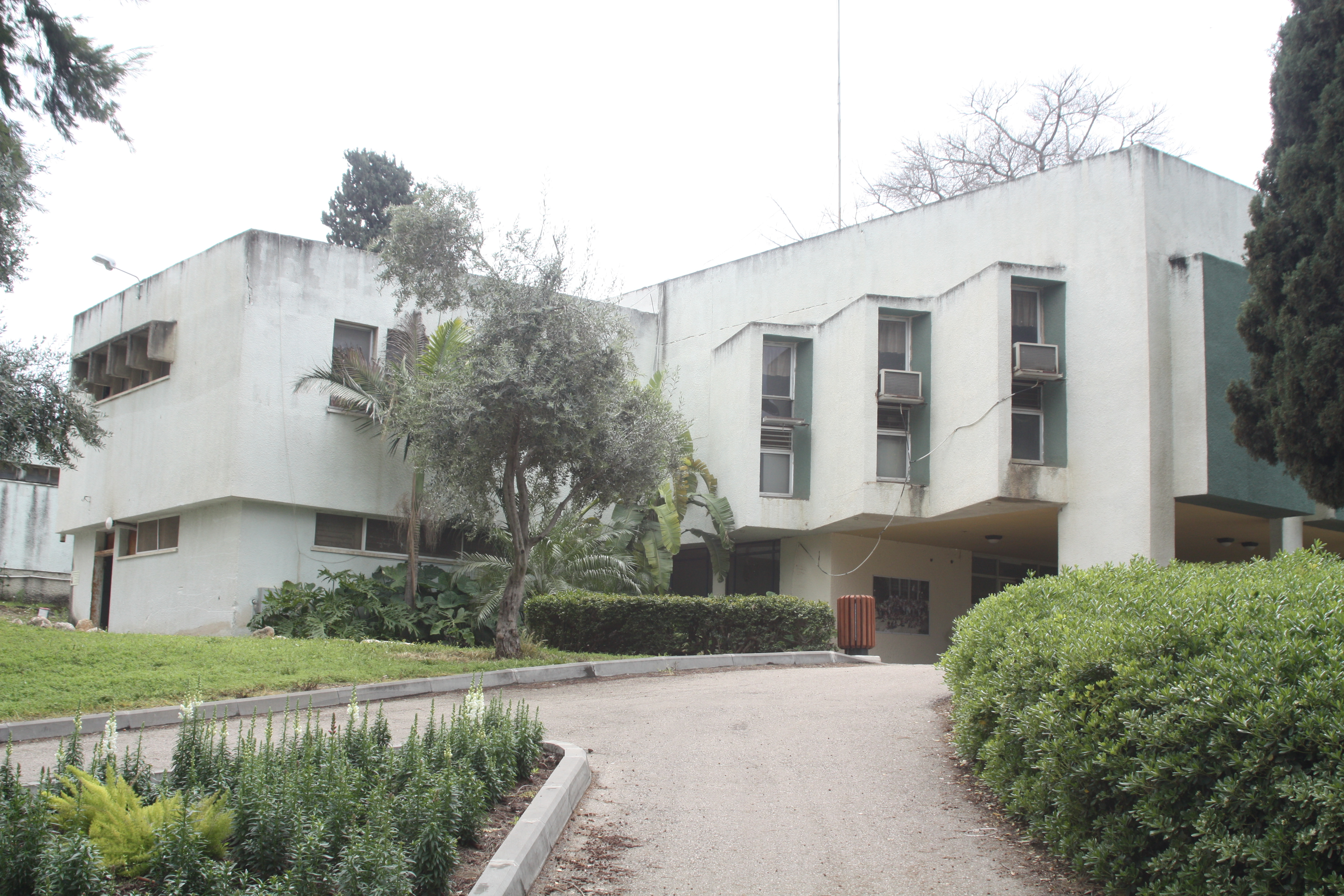
- Kibbutz dining room
- Etymology: Border
- Location within Haifa region of Israel Location within Israel
- Coordinates: 32°26′24″N 35°02′51″E
- Country: Israel
- District: Haifa
- Subdistrict: Hadera
- Council: Menashe
- Affiliation: Kibbutz Movement
- Founded: 8 September 1953
- Founder: Argentine Jews
- Population (2024): 461
- Website: www.metzer.org.il

Metzer (Hebrew: מֶצֶר, lit. Border) is a kibbutz in northern Israel. Located near the Green Line to the north of Baqa al-Gharbiyye, it falls under the jurisdiction of Menashe Regional Council. In 2024 it had a population of 461.

== Etymology ==
The Government Naming Committee mentioned Psalm 118:5 ("I called upon YAH [the Lord, Hashem] in distress [mêṣar]; YAH answered me[, and set me] in a broad place"). Metzar or metsar has the meaning of something tight, and figuratively of trouble (distress, pain, strait, terrors etc.). The Naming Committee referred to the fact that the kibbutz bordered the territory of Jordan (holding the West Bank at the time), with the border being just 500 meters from the centre of the kibbutz represented by the dining hall.

== History ==
The kibbutz was founded on 8 September 1953 by a garin ('nucleus') of 128 immigrants from Argentina who belonged to the Hashomer Hatzair movement and eager to flee Peronist rule. It became known for its embrace of leftist politics and involvement in the peace movement between Arabs and Jews. Members shared a water source and agricultural knowledge with Arab neighbours in Meiser. The community fostered "the school for co-existence" between Arabs and Jews, offering tours to Jewish tourists and schoolchildren of the kibbutz grounds and of neighbouring Meiser.

In 1964 and 1967 it received new members from Israeli nuclei. The kibbutz belongs to the National Kibbutz Movement.

The founders were trained at Kibbutz Merhavia (1950-1952) and later at other kibbutzim - Ga'aton, Sa'ar, Gat and HaMa'apil.

=== Terrorist attacks ===
The community was impacted by the Second Intifada between 2000 and 2005.In October 2001, St.-Sgt. Yaniv Levy, a soldier in the Combat Engineering Brigade was murdered at close range by terrorists at the Kibbutz Metzer junction. Fatah's Tanzim claimed responsibility for the attack. One of the perpetrators, Mansour Shreim, also planned the 2002 Hadera attack. He was sentenced to 14 life sentences and was released in 2025. In 2025, he was released as part of a prisoner-hostage swap amid the Gaza War hostage crisis.

In November 2002, the 2002 Metzer attack took place at the kibbutz, where five Israeli civilians were murdered in a terror attack. The attack was masterminded by Muhammad Naifeh, a commander in Fatah’s Al-Aqsa Martyrs Brigades. Sirhan Sirhan, a Fatah terrorist was the assailant. He was killed in October 2003, while being pursued in his car in a joint operation by the Israel Defense Forces, Shin Bet and the Yamam.

In August 2025, the security coordinator of the kibbutz prevented a suspected terror stabbing attack at the entrance to the kibbutz by a Palestinian man from Tulkarm.
