= Ikhlas Khouli =

First Palestinian woman to be executed for a crime

Ikhlas Khouli was a 35-year-old resident of Tulkarm, West Bank, and mother of seven who was executed in 2002, without trial, by Fatah's Al-Aqsa Martyrs Brigade for allegedly collaborating with Israel. She was the first Palestinian woman to be executed for such a crime.

== Kidnapping and Execution ==
The Kidnapping and eventual execution of Ikhlas Khouli took place during the Second Intifada in August 2002. After the death of Ziad Mohammed Daas, a militia commander in the area, members of al-Aqsa Martyrs' Brigades suspected Khouli of feeding information to the Israeli government that led to his death. Members of this group kidnapped Khouli, and tortured her. During the torture process the group captured video of Khouli confessing to being an informant for Israel. News sources would characterize this confession as being made under duress. Khouli was found dead at a "disfigured monument plastered with posters of so-called "martyrs" and children killed in the intifada." in the city of Tulkarm.

== Legacy ==
Ikhlas Khouli was the mother of seven children. Her eldest son Bakir was also kidnapped by members of the al-Aqsa Martyrs' Brigades. Bakir later recounted in an interview how he was blindfolded and taken to a refugee camp, where he was tortured with electric wire and asked questions regarding his mothers alleged role with Israel. Bakir was later returned to his home, and his family. The family would face social isolation, with the eldest daughter of the family Najla Khouli stating that, "Even our grandmother won't talk to us,"
