= Samih Madhoun =

Samih Madhoun, also transliterated Samih al-Madhoun and Sameh Alamdhon (Arabic: سميح المدهون) was a senior leader of the Al-Aqsa Martyrs' Brigades, an armed group affiliated with the Palestinian political party Fatah. He was killed on 14 June 2007 in Nuseirat refugee camp in the central Gaza Strip by the al-Qassam Brigades, the military wing of the Hamas movement.
