= 2002 Wadi al-Haramiya sniper attack =

Palestinian attack against Israeli targets in West Bank

Wadi al-Haramiya sniper attack
- Part of the Second Intifada
- Location: 31.9919°N 35.2495°E; Wadi al-Haramiya checkpoint near Ofra, West Bank, occupied Palestinian territory
- Date: March 3, 2002
- Target: Israel Defense Forces
- Weapon: M1 Garand
- Deaths: 10 (7 IDF soldiers, 3 Israeli civilians)
- Injuries: 6
- Perpetrator: Tha'ir Kayid Hammad of the al-Aqsa Martyrs Brigades
- Motive: Opposition to Israeli settlements built on Palestinian territories occupied by Israel
- Verdict: Life imprisonment
- Convicted: 1

A Palestinian sniper attack against Israeli soldiers and civilians took place at Wadi al-Haramiya on March 3, 2002. A lone Palestinian sniper, 22-year-old Tha'ir Kayid Hammad (Arabic: ثائر كايد حمّاد), a member of the al-Aqsa Martyrs' Brigades from the village of Silwad carried out the attack. He had acquired an old World War II-era M1 Garand rifle and 30 rounds of ammunition and had done target practice in the valleys around Silwad. Hammad managed to kill seven Israeli soldiers and three civilians before his rifle exploded while firing his 25th shot, forcing him to give up and escape. He was arrested two years later and sentenced to life imprisonment, and is currently imprisoned in Israel.

== The incident ==
Wadi al-Haramiya (Arabic: وادي الحرامية, lit. 'Valley of Thieves') is a valley between Ramallah and Nablus on the West Bank.

The Israel Defense Forces (IDF) was maintaining a checkpoint at Uyoun al-Haramiya (the Wells of Haramiya), near the Israeli settlement Ofra, manned by a reserve company.

Before dawn on the morning of March 3, 2002, the sniper positioned himself under some olive trees on a hilltop overlooking the checkpoint. At 6:40 he opened fire at the three soldiers manning the checkpoint and the driver of a civilian car, which had stopped at the checkpoint. All four were killed within minutes. Nine Israeli soldiers were inside a barracks building. Platoon commander Lieutenant David Damelin and the unit's medic Yochai Porat emerged from the building to locate the shooter and assist the casualties. Both were shot dead. The remaining soldiers decided to stay inside the building and called for reinforcements.

A patrol jeep that arrived with reinforcements immediately came under fire. The reserve company's sergeant, Avraham Ezra, was killed and several of his men were injured. The rest of the casualties occurred when randomly arriving civilian cars stopped at the checkpoint. Three Israeli civilians and an IDF officer were killed. Tha'ir Hammad claimed in an interview (obtained by unknown means from prison) that the Israelis were armed and that one of them took aim at him but that he shot first. He also claimed that he refrained from harming an Israeli woman and her children, shouting at her in Hebrew and Arabic to leave the area.

Two of the Israeli civilians killed, Sergei Birmov, 33, and Vadim Balagula, 32, were killed when they stopped their car at the checkpoint, as they made their way to work at a candy factory in Jerusalem.

The Israelis never succeeded in locating the sniper's hiding place even after dispatching a helicopter. He had intended to continue shooting but when he fired his 25th bullet the old rifle exploded, rendering it useless. He was thus forced to give up and return to his village. Seven soldiers, two of them officers, and three civilians were killed in the 25-minute attack. Another six Israelis were wounded, four of them seriously.

The al-Aqsa Martyrs Brigades, the armed wing of the Fatah movement, claimed responsibility for the attack. Fatah leader Marwan Barghouti praised the attack. "Blessed be the fighting hands of the heroes, who dealt these blows to the army of occupation," he said.

The Israeli authorities assumed that the shooter was a highly trained marksman from an elite unit, such as Force 17. The average Palestinian militant could not be expected to hit 16 targets with 25 bullets. Mossad also contacted European and American security agencies to help identify the killer. Mossad suspected that a member of the Irish Republican Army could be responsible for the act. The sniper became a hero among local residents.

Haaretz veteran military correspondent Ze'ev Schiff called the incident "[o]ne of most stinging and bizarre fiascoes" of the IDF in the Second Intifada: "the entire incident can only be described as a massive blunder and a disgrace for the IDF. No excuse can be accepted. This sort of incident cannot be blamed on the lower ranks." A series of investigations were carried out with the apparent purpose of exonerating the senior officers and putting the full blame on the soldiers at the checkpoint. The scandal led to a major overhaul of rules for IDF probes.

== Capture and imprisonment ==
On the night of October 3, 2004, following a manhunt by the IDF and Shin Bet, Tha'ir Kayid Hammad was arrested by an IDF force of the Duchifat Battalion. He was tried, convicted, and given 11 life sentences.

Hammad is incarcerated in Nafha Prison in the Negev. In 2015, he was put in solitary confinement after issuing a statement calling for Palestinians in the West Bank and Jerusalem to revolt over Israeli attacks on Al-Aqsa. In 2017, he was reportedly injured in a clash with prison guards.

== Fatalities ==
IDF soldiers:

1. Capt. Ariel Hovav, 25, of Eli
2. Lt. (res.) David Damelin, 29, of Kibbutz Metzar
3. 1st Sgt. (res.) Rafael Levy, 42, of Rishon LeZion
4. Sgt.-Maj. (res.) Avraham Ezra, 38, of Kiryat Bialik
5. Sgt.-Maj. (res.) Eran Gad, 24, of Rishon LeZion
6. Sgt.-Maj. (res.) Yochai Porat, 26, of Kfar Saba
7. Sgt.-Maj. (res.) Kfir Weiss, 24, of Beit Shemesh

Civilians:

1. Sergei Birmov, 33, of Ariel
2. Vadim Balagula, 32, of Ariel
3. Didi Yitzhak, 66, of Eli

== See also ==
- 2002 Hebron ambush
- Ein 'Arik checkpoint attack
