= Ein 'Arik checkpoint attack =

Attack on an IDF checkpoint during the second intifada

Coordinates: 31.9010°N 35.1508°E

Ein 'Arik ambush
- Part of Second Intifada
Date	19 February 2002
Location	Ein 'Arik, West Bank, Palestinian territories
Result	Palestinian victory

Belligerents
Israel Defense Forces	Al-Aqsa Martyrs' Brigades

Commanders and leaders
(Israel) Lt. Moshe Eini †	Unknown

Strength
(Israel) 8 soldiers	2 militants

Casualties and losses
1 police officer killed (Israel) 5 soldiers killed (Israel) 1 soldier wounded	None
- No civilian casualties

The Ein 'Arik checkpoint attack occurred 19 February 2002. One Israeli officer and 5 soldiers were killed in an attack on an IDF checkpoint near the Palestinian village of Ein 'Arik, west of Ramallah in the Israeli-occupied West Bank.

== History ==
The checkpoint was defended by eight soldiers, five of whom were on duty while three were resting in a nearby trailer. The two militants set out from Ramallah. They approached the checkpoint at 9 pm. Shortly after a change of guards they open fire on the soldiers at the checkpoint, killing three of them and moderately wounding a fourth. A fifth soldier, who served as the look-out, fled the scene unharmed and alerted military authorities. The militants then proceeded to a nearby trailer where the remaining soldiers were holed up. The commanding officer Lt. Moshe Eini and two other soldiers were killed. It is uncertain whether the Israeli soldiers ever returned fire. None of the militants were hurt in the clash and both returned to Ramallah.

The two militants were police officers of the Palestinian National Authority and reportedly members of the Fatah movement. The al-Aqsa Martyrs' Brigades claimed responsibility for the Ein ‘Arik attack. One of the participants of the attack, variously named "Said Saliman Saida" or "Shadi Sawaa'da" (Palestinian sources identify him as Shadi Sa'id as-Su’ayida Arabic: شادي سعيد السعايدة) was later arrested and sentenced to 7 life sentences. Shortly after his trial he became ill and died in Soroka hospital. A leader of Al-Aqsa Brigades, Kamil Ghanam [Kamal Ranam] (Arabic: كامل غنام), claimed that Su’ayida "was in excellent health when he was arrested... We are sure Israel killed him as revenge [for the 2002 attack]." The second militant was identified as Da'oud al-Haj.

Aftermath

In response, Israeli paratroopers were ordered to attack Palestinian police positions. An Israeli soldier who participated in the incident described it as "an eye for an eye". The identity of the attackers were then unknown but Israel held the Palestinian police responsible for letting them through their checkpoints. 15 Palestinian police officers were killed that night, some of them unarmed.

== Fatalities ==
Israel Defence Forces

- Lt. Moshe Eini, 21, of Petah Tikva
- St.-Sgt. Benny Kikis, 20, of Carmiel
- St.-Sgt. Mark Podolsky, 20, of Tel Aviv
- St.-Sgt. Erez Turgeman, 20, of Jerusalem
- St.-Sgt. Tamir Atsmi, 21, of Kiryat Ono
- St.-Sgt. Michael Oxsman, 21, of Haifa

al-Aqsa Martyrs Brigades

- Shadi Sa'id as-Su’ayida

== See also ==
- 2002 Hebron ambush
- Wadi al-Haramiya sniper attack
