= Yeshivat Beit Yisrael bombing =

Suicide bombing in the Second Intifada (2 March 2002)

Coordinates: 31.7887°N 35.2223°E

- Part of the Second Intifada militancy campaign
- The attack site
- Location: Jerusalem
- Date: 2 March 2002; 24 years ago c. 19:00 pm (GMT+2)
- Attack type: Suicide bombing
- Deaths: 10 civilians (+ 1 suicide bomber)
- Injuries: Over 50, 4 critically
- Perpetrator: Al-Aqsa Martyrs Brigade claimed responsibility
- Assailant: Mohammed al-Chouhani

A Palestinian suicide bombing occurred in the Beit Yisrael neighborhood in downtown Jerusalem on 2 March 2002. Eleven Israeli civilians were killed in the attack, including two infants, three children and two teenagers. Over 50 people were injured in the attack, four of them critically. The bombing took place at the entrance of the Haredi yeshiva "Beit Yisrael" in central Jerusalem where people had gathered for a bar mitzvah celebration. The suicide bomber detonated the bomb full of shrapnel alongside a group of women with their baby strollers, waiting for the services in a nearby synagogue to conclude. The Palestinian militant organization al-Aqsa Martyrs' Brigades claimed responsibility for the attack.

== The attack ==
The bombing took place on Saturday evening in the Haredi Beit Yisrael neighborhood of Jerusalem, a neighborhood that had been targeted in three previous attacks.

Shortly after 7 PM, the streets were crowded with worshippers who had just finished the sun-down prayers that mark the conclusion of the Shabbat. People had gathered near the Mahane Yisrael yeshiva for the bar mitzvah of Naveh Hazan. Another family, the Hajabis, were also celebrating their son's bar mitzvah, and members of the related Nehmad and Ilan families had arrived in Jerusalem for the celebration. Upwards of 1,000 Jews prayed every Saturday evening at the Mahane Israel seminary.

The bomber was standing alongside a group of women with baby carriages who were waiting for their husbands to return from the synagogue, and blew himself up just as the family and guests were beginning to leave. The ensuing blast shook downtown Jerusalem, and ignited a nearby car. Among the dead were an infant and her six-year-old brother, a mother and her three-year-old son, and a 12-year-old boy. The dead included members of the Hajabi, Hazan, Nehmad, and Ilan families. A woman who was pregnant with twins survived but lost both of her unborn children. Two babies were taken to Hadassah Medical Center, the whereabouts of their parents unknown.

The bombing occurred only meters from the site of a previous car bombing the year before. At the Mahane Yisrael seminary, a stone wall was splattered in blood.

Shlomi, an eyewitness, saw a baby carriage alongside a dead baby and other dead people. Another witness said that she and everyone else in her family had been injured when the bomber attacked:

I was speaking with everyone and when I turned around I saw people flying in the air. My brother fell onto me. I didn't know if my brother was wounded or the blood of other wounded people was on him. All I felt was pain.

Eitan of the Magen David Adom recounted:

We arrived at the site and saw scenes of horror. Young children, old people, women, lying in the road without hands, without legs, blood everywhere and enormous destruction all about. Only some had the strength to scream or cry. The quiet was the thing I remember most... This was one of the worst attacks I can remember.

Livnat, the sister of Sofia Ya'arit Eliyahu who died in the blast with her seven-month-old son, described her experience:

On Saturday night, we went out for a walk with two baby carriages. Sofia's baby started crying and she bent down to pick him up, while I continued walking with her little girl. We were 10 meters from them when we heard a horrendous explosion ... I looked back and saw only a huge inferno. Sofia and the baby had disappeared."

== Fatalities ==
Ten people were killed instantly in the attack, and an eleventh died later of his injuries. 8 of those fatalities were from the Nehmad family. Over 50 people were injured.

== Perpetrators ==
The al-Aqsa Martyrs' Brigades, the armed wing of Fatah, claimed responsibility and said the attack was to avenge the deaths of 19 Palestinians killed during Israeli military incursions into the Balata and Jenin refugee camps earlier in the week. The bomber was identified as 19-year-old Mohammed al-Chouhani from the Dheisheh refugee camp near Bethlehem. Around 1,500 Palestinians celebrated through the camp handing out sweets and shooting in the air.

Two of the bomber's assistants, Ashraf Hajajre and Muhammad Sarahne, were later captured and sentenced to life imprisonment in March 2004 and November 2003 respectively, but later released as part of October 2025 Gaza ceasefire agreement.

== Official reactions ==
=== Involved parties ===
- Hundreds of Palestinians celebrated on hearing the news and took to the streets firing guns into the air.

=== International ===
The US State Department harshly condemned this "terrorist outrage". "Such murder of innocent citizens cannot be justified and can only harm the interests and aspirations of the Palestinian people in progress toward a better future ... We call upon Chairman Arafat and the Palestinian Authority to do everything possible to confront and stop the terrorists responsible for these criminal acts."

=== Supranational ===
United Nations High Commissioner for Human Rights Mary Robinson expressed her shock and horror and said, "Acts of suicide bombings in Israel harm the interests and aspirations of the Palestinian people because they undermine support for the cause of self-determination and the fight against occupation."

== Burials ==
The Nehamad family were buried in Rishon Letzion. The Israeli Health Minister, Nissim Dahan, said of the dead: "They cut off the most beautiful flowers before their time was due." The eulogies expressed feelings of bitterness and anger. Sofia Ya'arit Eliyahu, 23, and her seven-month-old son, Avraham Eliyahu were buried at Moshav Noam.

== Media coverage controversy ==
Prior to the attack, the broadcast channel Arutz 2 ("Channel 2") aired a soccer match between Maccabi Haifa and Maccabi Kiryat Gat. When the attack was reported to the media, the channel decided to broadcast reports from a suicide attack in Jerusalem side-by-side with the ongoing match, an act which was followed by harsh criticism both by journalists and by the general public.

== See also ==
- Israeli casualties of war
