= Islamic Jihad for the Liberation of Palestine =

Islamic Jihad for the Liberation of Palestine (IJLP) was a Lebanese Shia group that claimed credit for the January 24, 1987 abduction of three American and one Indian professors – Alann Steen, Jesse Turner, Robert Polhill, Mithaleshwar Singh – from Beirut University College in West Beirut. They were eventually released.

== Kidnapping of american catedratics ==
On January 24, 1987, the Alann Steen, Jesse Turner, Robert Polhill, Mithal Eshwar Singh was kidnapped by unknown militants dressed as lebanese police, later identified as Islamic Jihad for the Liberation of Palestine The abducted were staff of the university, who stopped living in the campus apartments for security reasons, but were stalked by their captors. The JILP militiamen demanded the release of 100 Arab prisoners in Israel in exchange for the release of the professors, to which Israeli authorities refused to accept the exchange.

During the first weeks of the kidnapping, Professor Alann Steen began to have complications in his health, with some of the kidnapped people reporting that his state of health was deplorable. After a few weeks, the professor began to improve his health, thanking his captors for their care in the tapes published by the terrorists.

=== Release of the hostages ===
It wasn't until October 4, 1988, when Mithileshwar Singh is released after ten months of captivity, handed over to Syrian authorities who handed over members of the US forces. US authorities stressed that Singh's release occurred without the need for agreements or negotiations with the kidnappers.

It was not until April 23, 1990, when Robert Polhill was finally released after 39 months of captivity. Polhill would end up passing away at the age of 65 at Georgetown University Teaching Hospital on July 3, 1999, due to complications with cancer.

Months later, on October 21, 1991, the YILP released Jesse Turner after holding him for nearly four years. Six days later, Turner return to the United States. Weeks later, on December 3, the last American hostage Alann Steen was released, officially the penultimate American hostage on Lebanese soil.
