= 2002 Hadera attack =

Mass shooting and grenade attack in Israel

- Part of the Second Intifada militancy campaign
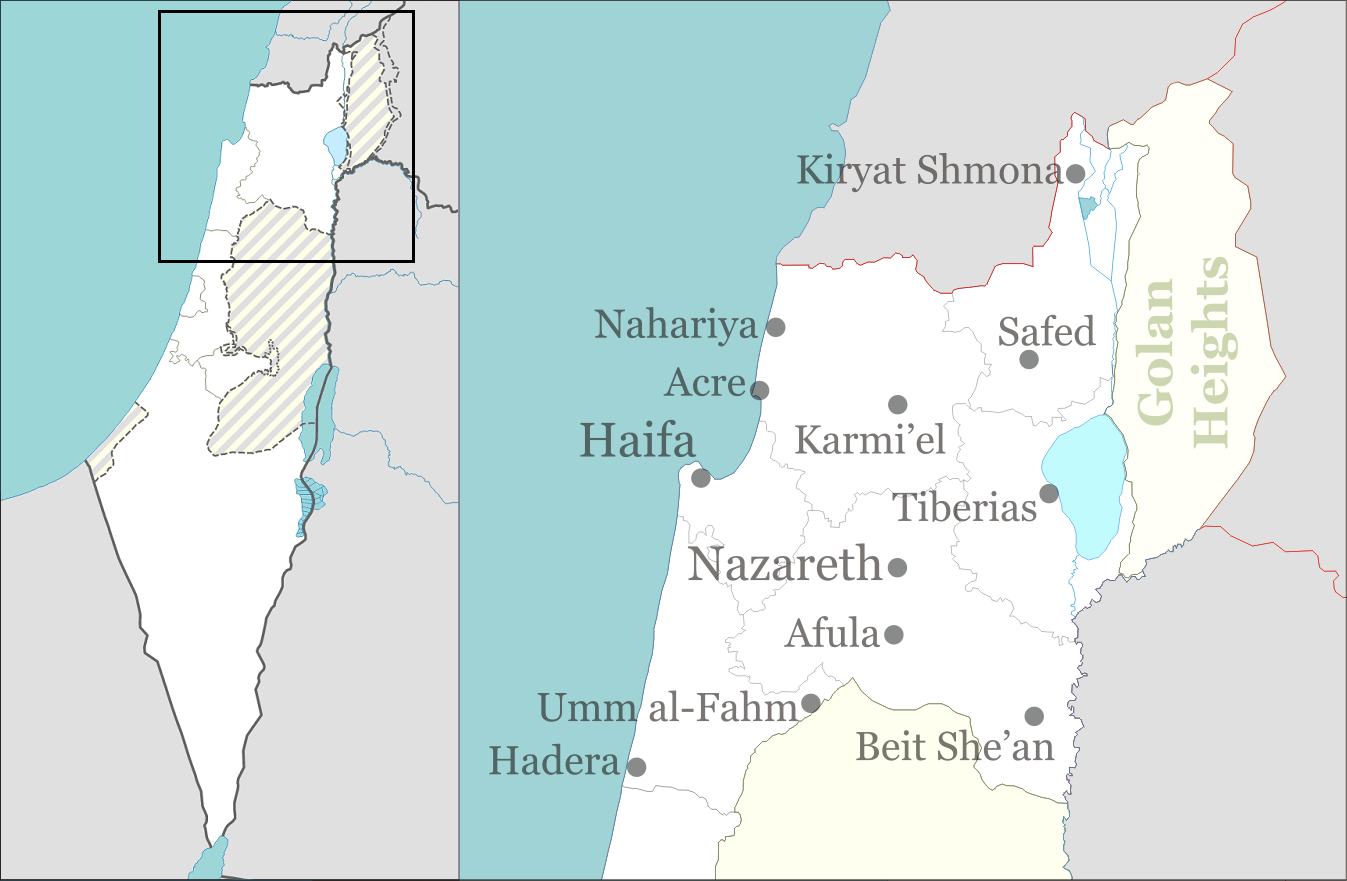
- The attack site
- Native name: הפיגוע באולם ארמון דוד
- Location: 32°26′18″N 34°55′32″E; Hadera, Israel
- Date: January 17, 2002; 24 years ago c. 9:45 pm (UTC+2)
- Attack type: Mass shooting; massacre; murder–suicide; suicide bombing
- Weapons: M16 rifle; grenades
- Deaths: 6 civilians (+1 assailant)
- Injuries: 33 civilians
- Perpetrator: al-Aqsa Martyrs Brigades claimed responsibility
- Assailant: Abdul Salaam Sadek Hassouneh

On Thursday, January 17, 2002, a Palestinian gunman, 24-year-old Abdul Salaam Sadek Hassouneh, killed six people and wounded 33 at a bat mitzvah celebration in Hadera, Israel.

== Attack ==
The attack took place at 9:45 pm (GMT+2) as guests were departing. The al-Aqsa Martyrs' Brigades assumed responsibility for the attack, claiming it was vengeance for the killing of its leader Raed Karmi. An Israeli police spokesman said the man, apparently on a suicide mission, had thrown several grenades into the Armon David wedding hall, where the Bat Mitzvah celebration had taken place, and detonated explosives on himself. The attacker was shot by police. A belt filled with explosives was found on the attacker.

== Victims ==
The six people who were killed at the Bar Mitzvah were:

Edward Bakshayev, 48, of Or Akiva

Anatoly Bakshayev, 63, of Or Akiva

Aharon Ben Yisrael-Ellis, 32, of Ra'anana

Dina Binayev, 48, of Ashkelon

Boris Melikhov, 56, of Sderot

and Avi Yazdi, 25, of Hadera.

Aharon Ellis was an American singer who was performing at the Bar Mitzvah. His wife filled a lawsuit in US Federal Court against the Palestinian Authority with which al-Aqsa Martyrs is affiliated. It was alleged that that the perpetrator was a Palestinian Authority officer.

A judgment of $173 million was imposed but the sides signed an agreement in October 2009 with the final sum paid not revealed.

== Perpetrator ==
The al-Aqsa Martyrs Brigades said the attacker, 24-year-old Abdel Salam Hassouna, was from a village near Nablus and launched the attack to avenge the death of Raed Karmi.

After the attack a video made earlier by the attacker was released, in which he is seen declaring: "I am doing this to avenge all the Palestinian martyrs."

== Official reactions ==
Involved parties

- Israel
- Palestinian territories
  - The Palestinian Authority condemned the attack but blamed Israel for provoking it.

International

- United States: the US government condemned the Hadera attack "in the strongest possible terms," calling it a "horrific act of terrorism." The widow of the one American killed in the attack, Aharon Ellis, brought a lawsuit against the Palestinian Authority that received a $173 million default judgment in 2006, and in 2009 was settled out of court.

== See also ==
- List of massacres in Israel
- Palestinian political violence
- Passover massacre
- List of terrorist incidents, 2002
