= Raed Al Karmi =

Palestinian Fatah member assassinated by Israel in 2002

Raed Al Karmi (died 14 January 2002) was a Palestinian militant and a leader of the Fatah-associated Al-Aqsa Martyrs' Brigades during the Second Intifada. He was involved in the killing of two Tel Aviv restaurant owners, Etgar Zeituni and Moti Dayan, in Tulkarm on 23 January 2001. Israeli officials accused him of responsibility for the shooting deaths of nine Israelis.

Al Karmi was the target of missiles by Israeli forces in September 2001 but survived the attack. However, two people he was riding with were killed. Karmi was assassinated by Israel in Tulkarem on 14 January 2002 in a bombing near his home.

Karmi's funeral was held in Tulkarm on 15 January 2002. Agence France-Presse reported that approximately 10,000 people attended and that armed mourners fired into the air and called for revenge.

According to sociologist Bader Araj, Karmi's assassination prompted Fatah's first suicide bombing. On 11 February 2002, Yasser Arafat decided to dismantle the Al-Aqsa Martyrs' Brigades, but the group issued a statement challenging his decision. Binyamin Ben-Eliezer, the Israeli defence minister at the time, later said that he had warned prime minister Ariel Sharon that killing Karmi would end the ceasefire, but that Sharon insisted the operation proceed.

A street in his hometown, Tulkarem, was named after him in 2015.

== See also ==
- Al-Aqsa Martyrs' Brigades
- Lions' Den militant group
