= Beit Yisrael =

Neighborhood in Jerusalem

- Neighborhood
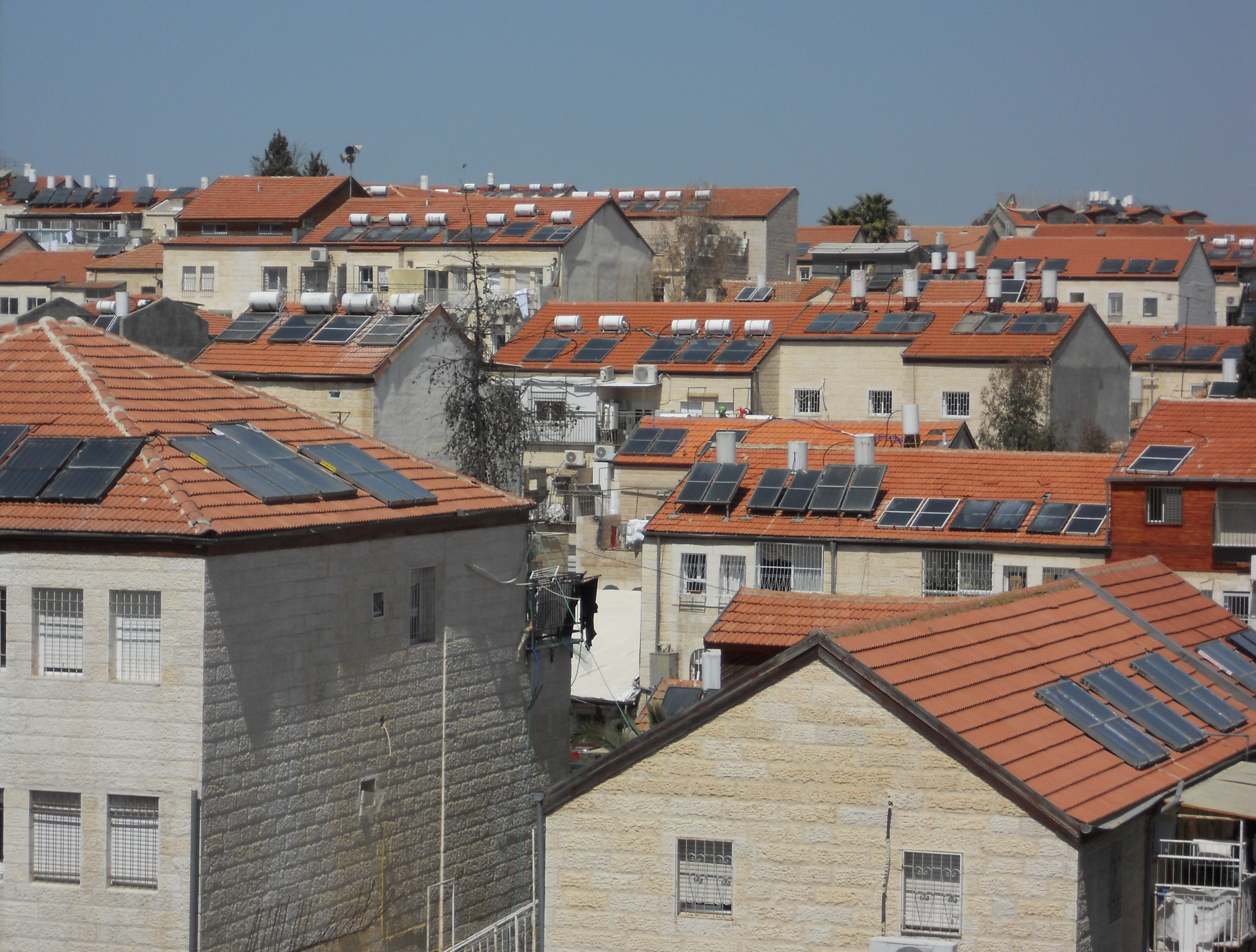
- In April 2012
- Etymology: lit. 'House of Israel'
- Location in Jerusalem
- Country: Israel
- City: Jerusalem

Beit Yisrael (Hebrew: בית ישראל, lit. 'House of Israel') is a predominantly Haredi neighborhood in central Jerusalem. It is located just north of Mea Shearim.

== History ==
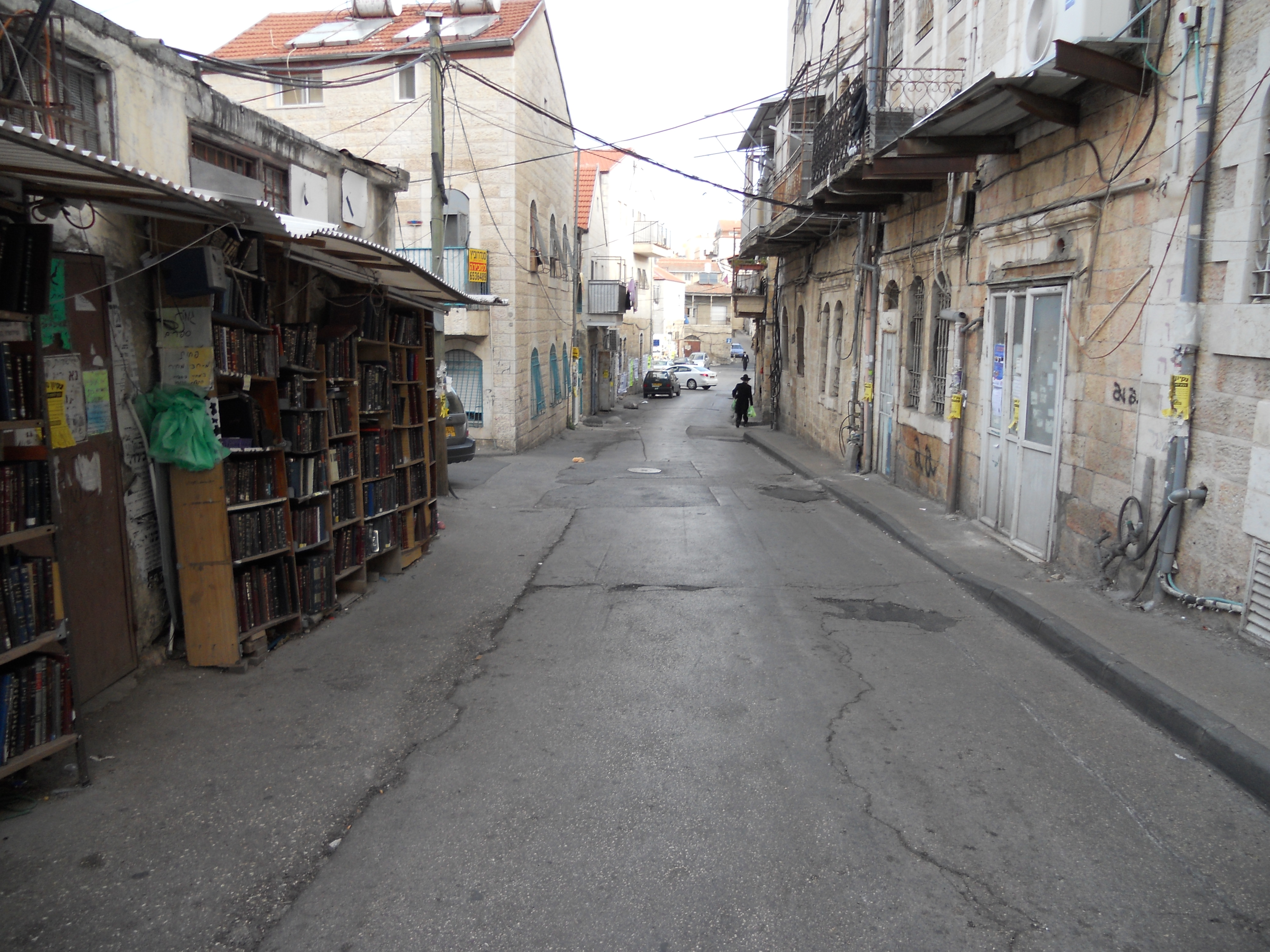
Rabbi Sonnenfeld Street

Beit Yisrael is located in the vicinity of two ancient refuse mounds, the taller of which was 40 feet (12 m) high. Locals always supposed their origin was from long-defunct area soap works; however, their positioning just outside the 3rd wall of the Roman Judea period pointed to another possibility—ash heaps from remnants of korbanot ([animal] sacrifices) from the Temple in Jerusalem, which were required to be placed outside the city (see terumat hadeshen). Samples of the material sent to Justus von Liebig in Munich seemed to confirm the latter hypothesis. The mounds disappeared around the time of the Second World War.

Founded in the 1880s as an extension of Mea Shearim, the neighborhood was originally called "Mea Shearim HaHadasha" (Hebrew: מאה שערים החדשה, lit. 'The New Mea Shearim'). A number of prominent community activists of the Old Yishuv, looking for a solution to the skyrocketing costs of living quarters in Mea Shearim, came up with the idea to purchase the adjacent plot of land, a dirty and infested area nicknamed "the pool" because of its severe drainage problems. Aryeh Leib Dayan purchased the plot for a cheap price, after which they drained the water and began to build. The neighborhood book of regulations describes some of the difficulties of the time:

Poverty and shortage spread their dominion over the holy city of Jerusalem, may it be rebuilt. Her sons die on a daily basis, and the majority are poor and destitute. Even the measly stipend that served as a bit of relief for the poor of Jerusalem to pay their bills has, for various reasons, been reduced to almost nothing, and the sons of Zion will soon have to search for another place to live. Lest it be too late and they find themselves, God forbid, compelled to sleep outside in the fields, on the stones and in the caves...they have, with the help of God, succeeded in gathering about a hundred members...to buy field and vineyard on which to build houses...

The name Beit Yisrael is derived from the verse in Ezekiel 36:10, in which Ezekiel prophesies to the hills and mountains of Israel, "I shall make numerous on you the people, the entire House of Israel; the cities will be reinhabited and the ruins will be rebuilt."

Beit Yisrael originally consisted of one central street by the same name, which contained the main synagogue, with small alleyways branching off on which houses were built. Another main street, which connected the neighborhood to Mea Shearim, was built later and named for Dayan. Two-story houses lined the roads, with spacious courtyards behind them and a shared well for every two houses. The inhabitants were originally poor people who could not afford housing in other neighborhoods, though many olim from across the globe settled there as well. By 1900, there were sixty houses and two synagogues. Throughout the years of Mandate Palestine, the neighborhood continued to grow, eventually expanding to the north. During the 1947–1949 Palestine war Beit Yisrael was on the front lines, and from 1949 until 1967, it was situated adjacent to the Armistice Line and the border with Jordan.

On March 2, 2002, eleven people were killed and over 50 injured in a suicide bombing outside a yeshiva in the neighborhood, where people had gathered for a bar mitzvah celebration.

== Religious institutions ==
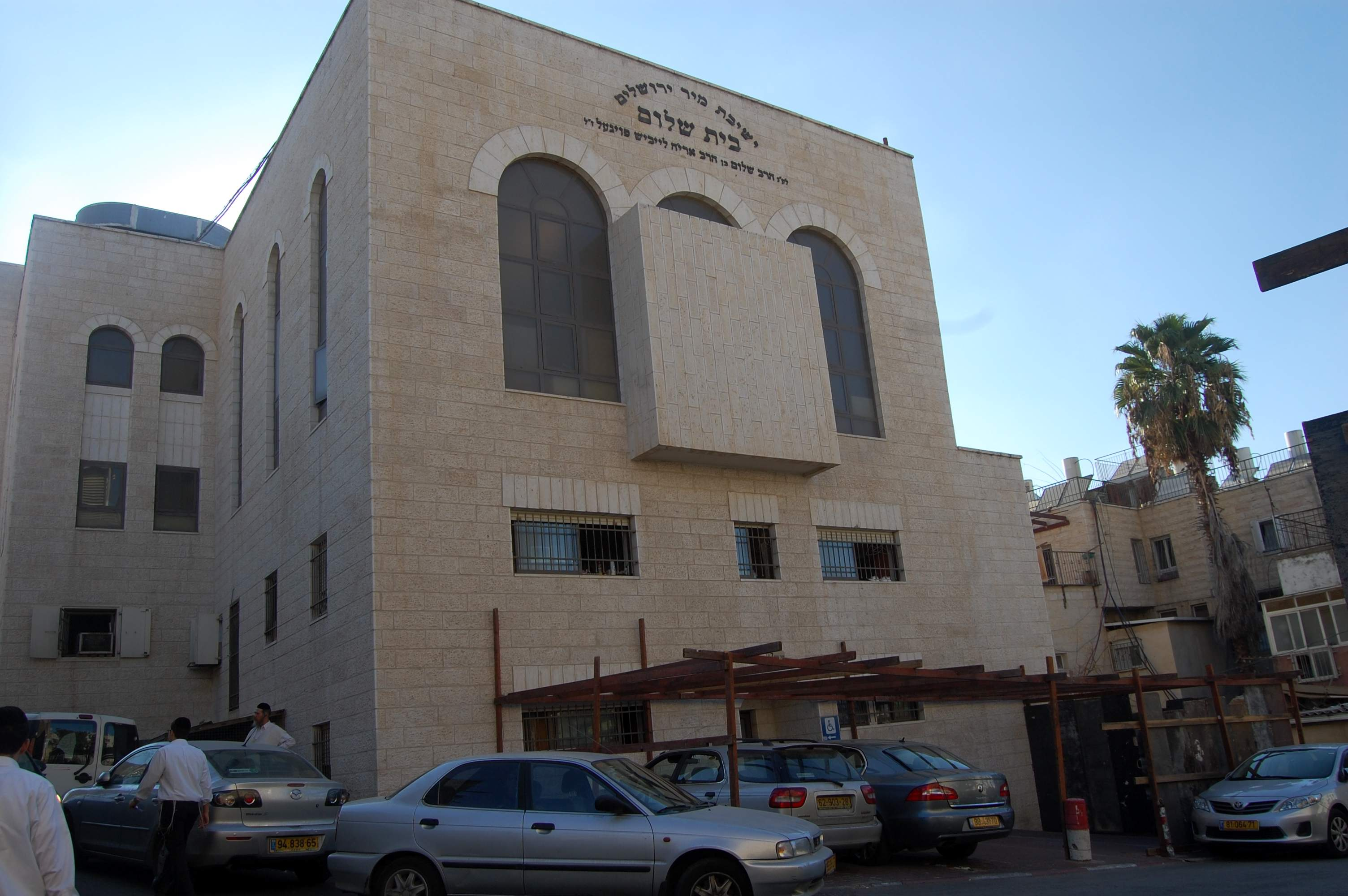
Front of Mir Yeshiva's Beis Shalom

The neighborhood is populated predominantly by Haredi Jews. The neighborhood's main synagogue, Beit Yaakov (Hebrew: בית יעקב), was established in 1887 using funds donated by a donor who wished to remain anonymous. The marble plaque, which can still be seen on the wall, relates some of the background of the donation:

For eternal remembrance in God's sanctuary, this study hall was built with the donation of a single donor, whose identity is hidden and mysterious, who donated 110 Napoleons with the help of Rabbi Yitzchok Yaakov, son of Yosef Shabtai from Kherson, thus the synagogue shall be named "Beit Yaakov". The donor has stipulated that it be prohibited to change this synagogue to be used for any purpose other than a study hall for the Beit Yisrael community. May God command His blessing to rest on them, and they and their descendants should reap their full reward, both physical and spiritual, until the coming of Moshiach, and they should merit to see the rebuilding of the Temple speedily, in our days. The remaining funds for the building were taken from the Beit Yisrael community. Completed and established in the year 5647/1887. May My house be a place of prayer for Beit Yisrael for all eternity.

There has been speculation as to the identity of this anonymous donor; a local legend holds that a wealthy resident often lent money to local businessmen. Once, after forgetting that one of his debtors, Shlomo Zalman Porush, the administrator of the city's charity fund, had already repaid his loan, he asked for payment. Porush insisted that he had already paid, so they went to Rav Shmuel Salant. In such a scenario, under Jewish monetary law, the debtor must swear that he repaid the loan to the creditor. The debtor, even after swearing, and now absolved from paying, paid a second time. When the creditor discovered his error, he immediately went back to the debtor in order to return the money. Porush refused the money, saying he doesn't want to take money which he made an oath over. He instead donated the money to build Beit Yaakov.

The Beit Yaakov synagogue (also known as Beis Yisroel Shteiblach) has six smaller rooms, known as shteiblach, in which minyanim can be found at almost any hour. According to the synagogue administration, more people pray there daily than in any other synagogue in Jerusalem, including the famed Zikhron Moshe shteiblach. The entire complex was refurbished and modernized in the last few years. To the west of the synagogue building is the Machane Yisrael Yeshiva for baalei teshuva (returnees to religious observance).

Many other synagogues can be found in Beit Yisrael, owing to the many Jews of various ethnic backgrounds who preferred to pray according to their local custom, including Jews from Dagestan, Kurdistan, Afghanistan, and others. There are also many synagogues of various Hasidic sects, including Pinsk-Karlin, Lelov, Lubavitch, and Zvhil.

Also located in Beit Yisrael is the Mir Yeshiva, the largest yeshiva in the world, boasting over 9,000 students.
