= Al-Aqsa Martyrs' Brigades =

Coalition of Palestinian militant groups

- كتائب شهداء الأقصى
- Leader: Raed Al Karmi (former)
- Dates active: 2000–present
- Ideology: Palestinian nationalism; Socialism; Anti-Zionism; Secularism; Factions: Islamism
- Part of: Fatah (until 2007)
- Website: nedal.net

The al-Aqsa Martyrs' Brigades (Arabic: كتائب شهداء الأقصى, romanized: Katāʾib Shuhadāʾ al-Aqṣā) (Note: Common, simplified romanization in English: Kataeb Shuhada Al-Aqsa.) are a Fatah-aligned coalition of Palestinian armed groups in the West Bank and the Gaza Strip.

Created in 2000 amidst the Second Intifada, the Brigades previously operated as the official armed wing of the Fatah political party before separating from them in 2007. Presently, the organization continues to be politically aligned with Fatah and nonetheless sometimes still presents itself as the party's armed wing, an association rejected by Fatah leadership.

The al-Aqsa Martyrs' Brigades have conducted various armed attacks on Israeli military and civilian targets since 2000. Notably, they have participated in the ongoing Gaza war (2023–present) alongside Hamas and other allied Palestinian factions.

The Brigades have been designated as a terrorist organization by Israel, the European Union, Canada, Japan, New Zealand, and the United States.

== Relationship with Fatah and the Palestinian Authority ==
The al-Aqsa Martyrs' Brigades were formed in Balata Camp, near Nablus in the West Bank, following a controversial visit in September 2000 by Israeli Prime Minister Ariel Sharon and a large police contingent to Temple Mount in Jerusalem. The al-Aqsa Martyrs' Brigades had a close connection to Fatah under the leadership of Yasser Arafat, although this connection was weakened following Arafat's death in 2004. The al-Aqsa Martyrs' Brigades continues to be aligned with Fatah politically.

Al-Aqsa Martyrs Brigades announced their separation from the Fatah party in 2007, coinciding with President Mahmoud Abbas’s announcement of a decree banning all armed militias. The Fatah movement does not currently officially adopt the military wing, and its statements and websites are devoid of any reference to it or its members and leaders. In 2007 to 2008 some members defected to the Palestinian Authority while others formed Islamist splinter groups such as the Popular Resistance Committees (PRC) in the Gaza Strip. Ibrahim al-Nabulsi has been described as "a Fatah leader from Kataeb Shuhada' Al-Aqsa" but it is possible that many people have separate affiliations to both.

=== Before 2007 ===
Since 2002, some leaders in Fatah have reportedly tried to get the Brigades to stop attacking civilians.

In November 2003, BBC journalists uncovered a payment by Fatah of $50,000 a month to the Brigades This investigation, combined with the documents found by the Israel Defense Forces (IDF), led the government of Israel to draw the conclusion that the al-Aqsa Martyrs' Brigades had always been directly funded by Yasser Arafat.

On 18 December 2003, Fatah asked the leaders of the al-Aqsa Martyr's Brigades to join the Fatah Council, recognizing it officially as part of the Fatah organization.

In June 2004, then Palestinian Prime Minister Ahmed Qurei openly stated this: "We have clearly declared that the Aksa Martyrs' Brigades are part of Fatah. We are committed to them and Fatah bears full responsibility for the group."

=== 2007 amnesty deal ===
In July 2007, Israel and the Palestinian Authority reached an amnesty deal under which 178 al-Aqsa gunmen surrendered their arms to the Palestinian Authority, renounced future anti-Israel violence and were permitted to join Palestinian security forces. Later agreements in 2007 and 2008 added more gunmen to the list of those granted amnesty in exchange for ending violence, eventually bringing the total to over 300.

On 22 August 2007, according to Arutz Sheva, the al-Aqsa Martyrs' Brigades announced that it was backing out of the amnesty deal due to the IDF's arrest of two members who had been granted amnesty. al-Aqsa members in Gaza engaged in retaliatory rocket fire aimed at Israel. The IDF said that the two men had continued to be engaged in terrorist activity, defending the arrests under the stipulations of the amnesty deal.

== Militant activities ==
=== 2000 – 2022 ===
The Al-Aqsa Martyrs Brigades are responsible for numerous attacks in the West Bank, targeting both Israelis and Palestinians.

The group's first attack occurred on 30 October 2000, when a young militant shot two Israeli police officers in the back at the entrance to the National Insurance Institute in East Jerusalem, killing an officer on the way to the hospital.

On 17 January 2001, Hisham Nikki, head of the official Palestinian Broadcasting Corporation associated with Yasser Arafat, was shot dead by masked gunmen in a restaurant in Gaza, Gaza Strip. Days later, the group claimed the murder of an Israeli civilian.

In January 2002 they carried out the 2002 Hadera attack, when a gunman killed six and wounded 33 in a Bat Mitzvah celebration. On 19 February 2002 the Brigades carried out the Ein 'Arik checkpoint attack, near Ramallah, where one officer and five soldiers were killed. On 3 March 2002 they carried out the Wadi al-Haramiya sniper attack on an IDF checkpoint at Wadi al-Haramiya, near Ofra, where two officers and five soldiers were killed and five soldiers wounded. Three civilian settlers were also killed in the incident. On 2 March 2002 they carried out the Yeshivat Beit Yisrael massacre in Beit Yisrael, Jerusalem where 11 were killed. In August 2002 they killed a Palestinian woman, Ikhlas Khouli for collaborating with Israel.

On 5 January 2003, the Brigades killed 22 people in the Tel Aviv Central bus station massacre. In November 2003, they killed the brother of Ghassan Shakaa (the mayor of Nablus).

On 29 January 2004, the Brigades carried out the Café Moment bombing in Rehavia, Jerusalem, resulting in 11 people being killed. During the first three months of 2004, a number of attacks on journalists in the West Bank and Gaza Strip were blamed on the Brigades as well, including the attack on the Arab television station Al Arabiya's West Bank offices by masked men who identified themselves as members of the Brigades. Palestinian journalists in Gaza called a general strike on 9 February 2004 to protest this rising violence against journalists. On 22 February 2004 they did a suicide bombing on a bus in West Jerusalem, killing 8 people. On 14 March 2004 the Brigades together with Hamas carried out the Port of Ashdod bombings where 10 were killed.

On 24 March 2004, a Palestinian teenager named Hussam Abdo was caught in an IDF checkpoint carrying an explosive belt. Following his arrest, an al-Aqsa Martyrs' Brigades teenagers' militant cell was exposed and arrested in Nablus. The al-Aqsa Martyrs' Brigades took prominent part in the July 2004 riots in the Gaza Strip, in which Palestinian officers were kidnapped and PA security headquarters buildings and policemen were attacked by gunmen. These riots led the Palestinian cabinet to declare a state of emergency. One media outlet described the situation in the Palestinian Authority as anarchy and chaos. On 23 September 2004, a 15-year-old suicide bomber was arrested by Israeli security forces.

On 16 October 2005, the al-Aqsa Martyrs' Brigades claimed responsibility for a shooting attack at the Gush Etzion Junction which killed three Israelis and wounded three others.

The European Union's Gaza offices were raided by 15 masked gunmen from al-Aqsa Martyrs' Brigades on 30 January 2006. They demanded apologies from Denmark and Norway regarding the Jyllands-Posten Muhammad cartoons and left 30 minutes later without shots fired or injuries.

On 9 June 2007, in a failed assault on an IDF position at the Kissufim crossing between Gaza and Israel in a possible attempt to kidnap IDF soldiers, 4 armed members of the al-Quds Brigades – the military wing of Islamic Jihad – and the Al-Aqsa Martyrs' Brigades as the then military wing of Fatah used a vehicle marked with "TV" and "PRESS" insignia, penetrated the border fence, and assaulted a guard tower in what Islamic Jihad and the army said was a failed attempt to capture an Israeli soldier. IDF troops killed one militant, while the others escaped. The use of a vehicle that resembled a press vehicle evoked a sharp response from many journalists and news organizations, including the Foreign Press Association and Human Rights Watch. On 14 July 2007, Zakaria Zubeidi – who was considered the local al-Aqsa leader for Jenin and the northern West Bank, and who had been wanted for many years for his armed activity against Israel – agreed to cease fighting against Israel after Prime Minister Ehud Olmert gave conditional pardon for 178 prisoners from the PA territories.

The Brigades claimed responsibility for the 2022 Bnei Brak shootings, where a gunman shot five people dead in the ultra-Orthodox Tel Aviv suburb of Bnei Brak before being killed.

=== Gaza war (2023–present) ===
The Al-Aqsa Martyrs' Brigades participated in the October 7 attacks on Israel, which triggered the ongoing systemic destruction of and genocide in Gaza by the IDF.

According to the Institute for the Study of War, during the Israeli invasion of the Gaza Strip, the al-Aqsa Martyrs' Brigades engaged in combat with the Israel Defence Forces in various locations throughout the Gaza Strip, including in Gaza City, Khan Yunis, and Juhor ad-Dik.

== Notable members ==
Notable members of the al-Aqsa Martyrs' Brigades includes active militants and militants that were killed or arrested by the Israeli security forces.

- Raed Al-Karmi: General commander and founder the Brigades; killed by Shin Bet on 14 January 2002 in Tulkarm.
- Naif Abu-Sharah: local commander in Nablus (killed by IDF).
- Fadi Kafisha: former head of the Tanzim in Nablus; killed by IDF in 2006.
- Sirhan Sirhan: Involved in the 2002 Metzer attack. Killed by Yamam in 2003.
- Zakaria Zubeidi: local commander in Jenin, known for his relationship with Israeli far left activist Tali Fahima.
- Samih Madhoun: senior leader. Killed in 2007 by the al-Qassam Brigades
- Ibrahim al-Nabulsi: local commander in Nablus, killed in August 2022.
- Chris Bandak: local commander in Bethlehem and the only known Christian in the Brigades at the time of his arrest in February 2003; released in 2011 as part of an exchange for the release of Gilad Shalit.
- Issam al-Salaj: head of the Balata Battalion killed during an Israeli special forces operation in the west bank city of Nablus.

== See also ==
- List of Palestinian suicide attacks (by al-Aqsa Martyrs' Brigades and others)
- Palestinian domestic weapons production
- Palestinian National Authority
- Popular Resistance Committees
- Use of child suicide bombers by Palestinian militant groups
