= Tanzim =

Current within the Palestinian Fatah movement

Tanzim (Arabic: التنظيم Al-Tanẓīm, "The Organization") was a term used by Palestinians to refer to the grassroots organisation of Fatah in Palestine during the 1990s and early 2000s, and by Israeli and American sources to refer to an alleged armed organisation said to operate within Fatah.

On 4 December 2001, Israel proscribed "Tanzim" as a terrorist organisation. No organisation by that name has been proscribed by any other countries.

== The 1990s ==
Writing in December 2000, shortly after the outbreak of the Second Intifada, journalist Graham Usher characterised the Tanzim as a current within Fatah that had originated among Palestinians within the occupied territories during the First Intifada.

Before 1994 the Fatah's West Bank organisation was encouraged from outside by Fatah leader Marwan Barghouti. After 1994, when exiled leaders of Fatah were allowed to return to Palestine as a result of the Oslo Accord, this grassroots cadre were either "marginalized or coopted" by the PA, Usher wrote. After the first Palestinian Legislative Council was elected in 1996, it was deputies associated with "Al-Tanzim" - i.e. those who had lived their lives in Palestine rather than exile - who were most liable to campaign against corruption and mismanagement in the new Palestinian Authority. They formed both the scaffolding of Fatah's grassroots organisation, and an internal opposition to the leadership of Yasser Arafat.

These cadre wanted less corruption, more democracy, fewer concessions to perceived Israeli violations of the Oslo Accord, and more cooperation between Palestinian factions, including those outside the Palestine Liberation Organisation. They also wanted an international strategy that engaged the Arab world and the United Nations, rather that just the United States. Early in the Second Intifada, Tanzim organised popular demonstrations against the occupation. Israel accused them of hiding armed individuals within the crowds who would fire on Israeli soldiers. Usher wrote that hundreds of Tanzim activists reactivated in the early Second Intifada, and participated in armed operations.

Israeli and American accounts present Tanzim as an armed organisation of Fatah members initiated by Yasser Arafat in 1995. Tanzim was a grassroots, community-level organisation intended to divert support from the emergent Islamist groups - Hamas and Islamic Jihad - to the Palestinian Authority and PLO leadership.

== The Second Intifada ==
On 9 November 2000, at the beginning of the Second Intifada, Hussein Abayat, an activist associated with Tanzim in Beit Sahur, was killed by a missile shot from an Israeli helicopter The operation is considered the first time that Israel publicly acknowledged conducting a targeted killing. Abayat's companion Khaled Salahat was severely wounded in the strike.

Marwan Barghouti who had been a leader of Tanzim during the 1990s, wrote in January 2002: "While I, and the Fatah movement to which I belong, strongly oppose attacks and the targeting of civilians inside Israel, our future neighbour, I reserve the right to protect myself, to resist the Israeli occupation of my country and to fight for my freedom."

== After the Second Intifada ==
On 15 February 2015, the Israeli army arrested Jamal Abu Lel, charging that he was "the head of" the Tanzim "terrorist organization". Israel alleged that Abu Lel ran the organisation from the Qalandiya refugee camp while carrying an Israeli permanent resident identity card due to his residiency in Kafr 'Aqab in East Jerusalem. Abu Lel was accused by the Shin Bet of funding and directing terrorist and shooting attacks against Israelis. No specific attacks were mentioned in connection with Abu Lel's arrest, and no press reports refer to armed actions claimed by Tanzim over the preceding years.

On 20 September 2023, a video was circulated on social media that was attributed in reporting variously to "the pro-Fatah Tanzim militia" and "Abbas loyalists". It claimed the legacy of the Al-Aqsa Martyrs' Brigades and denounced the Jenin Brigades for conspiring with "Shi'ite Iran" and Israel and damaging Palestinian security.

== Alleged attacks ==
Certain Palestinian armed attacks have been attributed to "Tanzim" or militants associated with it by Israeli and American sources. Below is a list of attacks attributed to "Tanzim" by Barry Rubin and Judith Colp Rubin. Other sources do not necessarily support the attribution.

Date of attack	Attack description	Reference
17 January 2001	Three Tanzim gunmen murder a 16-year-old Israeli	
25 January 2001	Tanzim militants kill an Israeli near the Atarot industrial zone, north of Jerusalem	
1 February 2001	Tanzim militants shot and killed an Israeli driver near the Aroub refugee camp in the West Bank	
11 February 2001	Tanzim militants shot and killed an Israeli driving home to the West Bank settlement of Gush Katif	
26 March 2001	A 10-month-old Israeli baby was shot by Tanzim	
15 May 2001	Three Israelis were shot and killed by Tanzim militants while driving on the Allon Road in the West Bank	
18 May 2001	Tanzim militants shot and killed an Israeli soldier and his mother on a road north of Jerusalem	
23 May 2001	Tanzim shot and killed an Israeli motorist outside the West Bank settlement of Ariel	
31 May 2001	Tanzim insurgents shot and killed an Israeli north of Tulkarem	
20 June 2001	A Tanzim militant killed an Israeli with gunfire who had gone to visit a Palestinian business partner in the West Bank village of Silat ad-Dhahr	
12 July 2001	Four Tanzim militants shot and killed an Israeli driver outside Kiryat Arba, a West Bank settlement	
13 July 2001	Tanzim insurgents killed an official investigating the site of the shooting near the Kiryat Arba settlement the previous day	
26 July 2001	Tanzim aligned-militants shot and killed an Israeli driver near Giv'at Ze'ev, a West Bank settlement.	
15 January 2002	Tanzim-aligned insurgents shot and killed a 45-year-old Israeli woman at a gas station near the Givat Ze’ev settlement	
16 January 2002	Tanzim-affiliated militants shot and killed an Arab resident of Beit Hanina in East Jerusalem, having mistaken her for a Jewish Israeli	
9 February 2002	Tanzim militants shot and killed an Israeli female driver on Highway 5 in the West Bank, and injure her son	
12 August 2004	A Tanzim militant killed two Palestinian civilians and injured 12 other Palestinian civilians and six Israeli border guards by detonating a bomb at the Qalandia checkpoint in the West Bank.	

== See also ==
- Palestinian political violence
- Second Palestinian Uprising
- Palestinian right of armed resistance
