= Gilboa Prison break =

2021 event in Israel

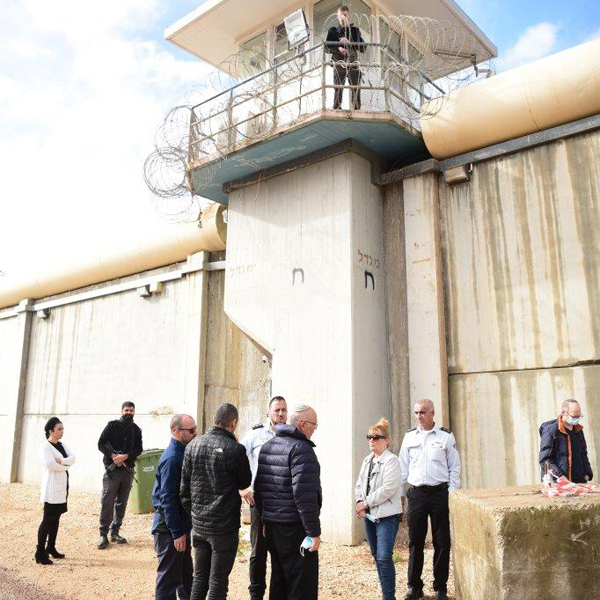
Guard tower Heth (ח׳) in the Gilboa prison, under which was the exit of the escape tunnel

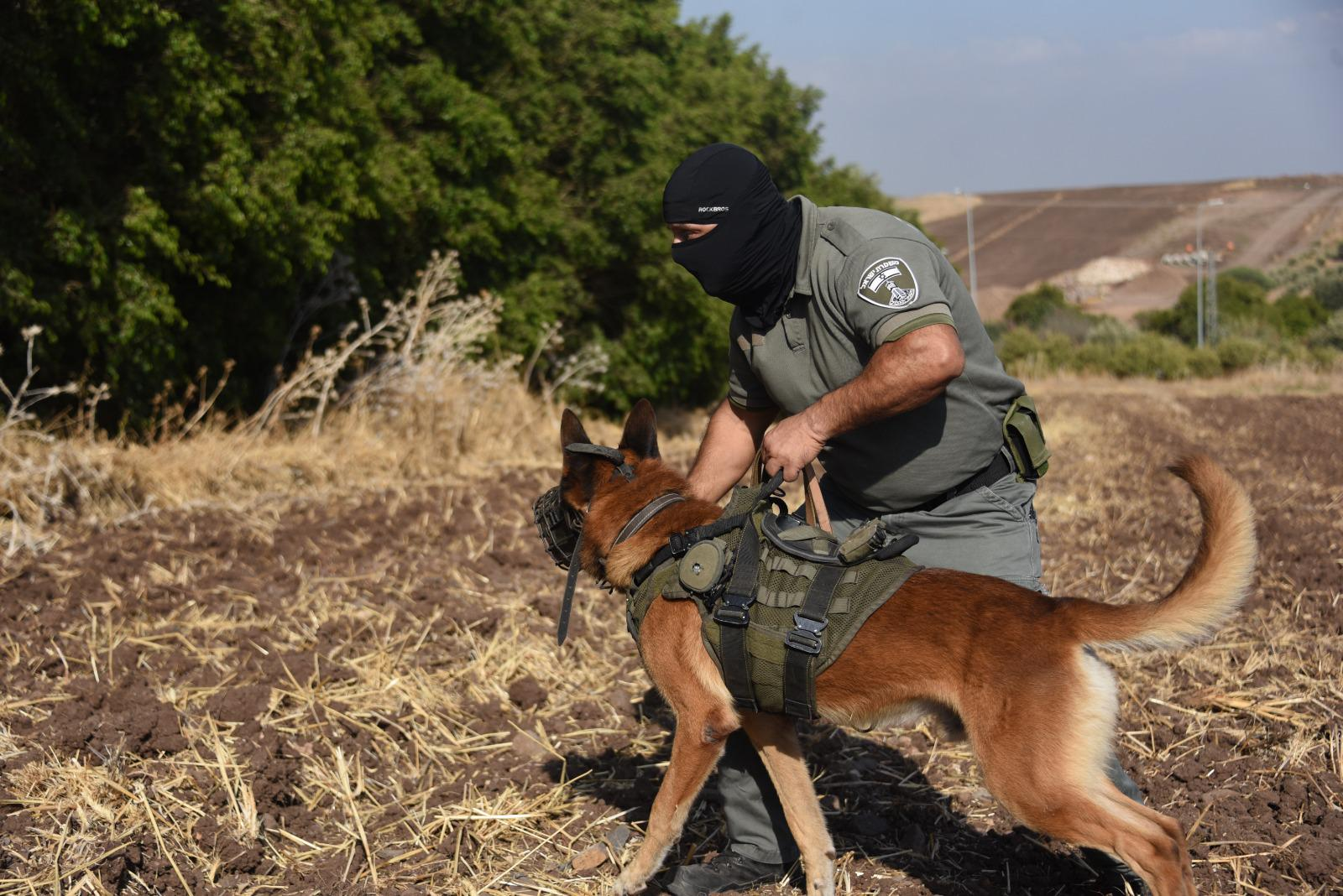
An Israel Border Police dog handler with his dog during the search

The Gilboa Prison break was a security event in Israel which occurred on 6 September 2021, when six Palestinian prisoners escaped from Gilboa Prison, a maximum security prison in northern Israel, through a tunnel.

Among the escapees was Zakaria Zubeidi, former leader of al-Aqsa Martyrs' Brigades in Jenin. The incident is considered to be the most significant prison break in Israel's history.

By September 19, all 6 escapees had been re-captured.

== Background ==
Gilboa Prison opened in 2004, and first it was called Shita B as part of the Shita Prison system. Shortly after, it became a separate independent prison with high security level designed for security prisoners following the Second Intifada.

In August 2014, a similar escape attempt was foiled when an underground tunnel that prisoners had been digging was discovered by Israeli security forces.

Cellphone call barriers were installed in the prison, but they were activated at an inefficient level, contrary to regulations and following protests from the part of the prisoners.

== The escape ==
The prisoners escaped through an underground tunnel in the prison's drainage system from the bathroom of cell number 5 in the second branch of the prison. The tunnel was about 22 meters long and had been surreptitiously dug over an extended period prior to the escape. A probe of the escape led by Shin Bet concluded that the digging begun as early as November 2020, and at least 11 prisoners helped dig the tunnel. The excavation was done with plates and pan handles, and dumped the excavated dirt in the prison's sewer system, garbage cans, and hollow shafts. A guard responsible for maintaining the sewer system had noticed blockages but did not report them to prison authorities. The prisoners hid the entry hole under a floorboard. A day before the escape, the most senior prisoner of the group, Zakaria Zubeidi, requested a transfer to the cell where the five other prisoners were located. The request was accepted with no suspicions raised.

The escape occurred on 6 September 2021, in the middle of the night, after 1:00 am. The hole from which the prisoners emerged was directly beneath a watchtower which was unmanned due to a manpower shortage. A guard in a nearby watchtower was asleep at the time. She later claimed that she had got up after hearing noises but didn't see anything and went back to sleep. As the prisoners emerged from the tunnel, guard dogs in the prison yard started barking, activating a warning system which trained security cameras in the direction that the dogs were barking. However, the guard who was supposed to be monitoring the video feed was allegedly watching television instead. The prisoners left their prison uniforms outside the tunnel and changed clothes. Although it was initially suspected that some of them had been picked up by a waiting car, Israeli investigators later determined that they had no vehicles during the break and had traveled on foot.

The first report regarding a suspected escape reached the police at 1:49 am, from a citizen driving on Route 71 who called the police and reported that he saw figures running in the fields. Within minutes, a patrol car arrived at the scene and began scanning it. An employee at a gas station in the area later reported a man who looked strange passing through the area. At 2:14 am, the deputy commander of the Beit She'an police station informed the prison control center about the reports of suspicious figures in the prison's vicinity that had come in. At around 3:00 am, farmers from the localities near the prison reported suspicious figures observed in the agricultural areas of the localities. At Gilboa Prison, prison staff carried out a headcount of the inmates. At 3:29 am, the staff reported that three inmates were missing. This was upgraded to six at 4:00 am.

Based on interrogations of recaptured prisoners, Shin Bet determined that after escaping, the six men walked about 7 kilometers (4.3 miles) to the Israeli-Arab town of Na'ura, where they asked a few local residents to drive them to Jenin and were refused. They then spent less than an hour in the local mosque where they showered and changed clothes before leaving town. After hearing that a significant number of security forces were deployed along the border with the West Bank, they decided to split into three pairs and go into hiding in northern Israel. Surveillance footage captured someone thought to be one of the suspects crossing into the West Bank near the village of Jalamah through a gap in the West Bank barrier.

== The escapees ==
Except Zubeidi, the escaped prisoners were Islamic Jihad members, four of which were serving life sentences after being convicted of planning or carrying out attacks that killed Israelis, while the youngest prisoner had been held without charge for two years in administrative detention:

- Zakaria Zubeidi (45), Commander of the Fatah's al-Aqsa Martyrs' Brigades in Jenin. Arrested for organizing numerous attacks against Israelis during the Second Intifada including a suicide bombing in Tel Aviv and an attack on a Likud polling station, as well as two shooting attacks on buses in November 2018 and January 2019. His trial was ongoing at the time of the escape.
- Mahmoud Abdullah Ardah (46), a member of Palestinian Islamic Jihad, was imprisoned since 1996 and was convicted for carrying out terror attacks and membership in Islamic Jihad.
- Mohammed Qassem Ardah (39), Mahmoud Abdullah's brother. Imprisoned in 2002 for carrying out terror attacks and membership in Islamic Jihad.
- Yaqoub Mahmoud Qadri (49), member of Palestinian Islamic Jihad, imprisoned since 2003 for planning attacks against Israelis and membership in Islamic Jihad.
- Ayham Nayef Kamamji (35), imprisoned since 2006 for the murder of Eliyahu Asheri.
- Monadel Yacoub Nafe’at (26), member of Islamic Jihad, imprisoned under administrative detention since 2019.

== Manhunt ==
Israeli police search operations

After learning of the escape, the Israel Police, including units of the Israel Border Police, began searching for the escaped prisoners in cooperation with the Shin Bet, the General Security Service. The Israel Defense Forces deployed two battalions, two reconnaissance teams, a number of special forces squads, and aerial surveillance teams to assist in the search efforts. The Shin Bet initially believed the prisoners had been in contact with people outside the prison using a smuggled mobile phone and that they had been picked up in a car.

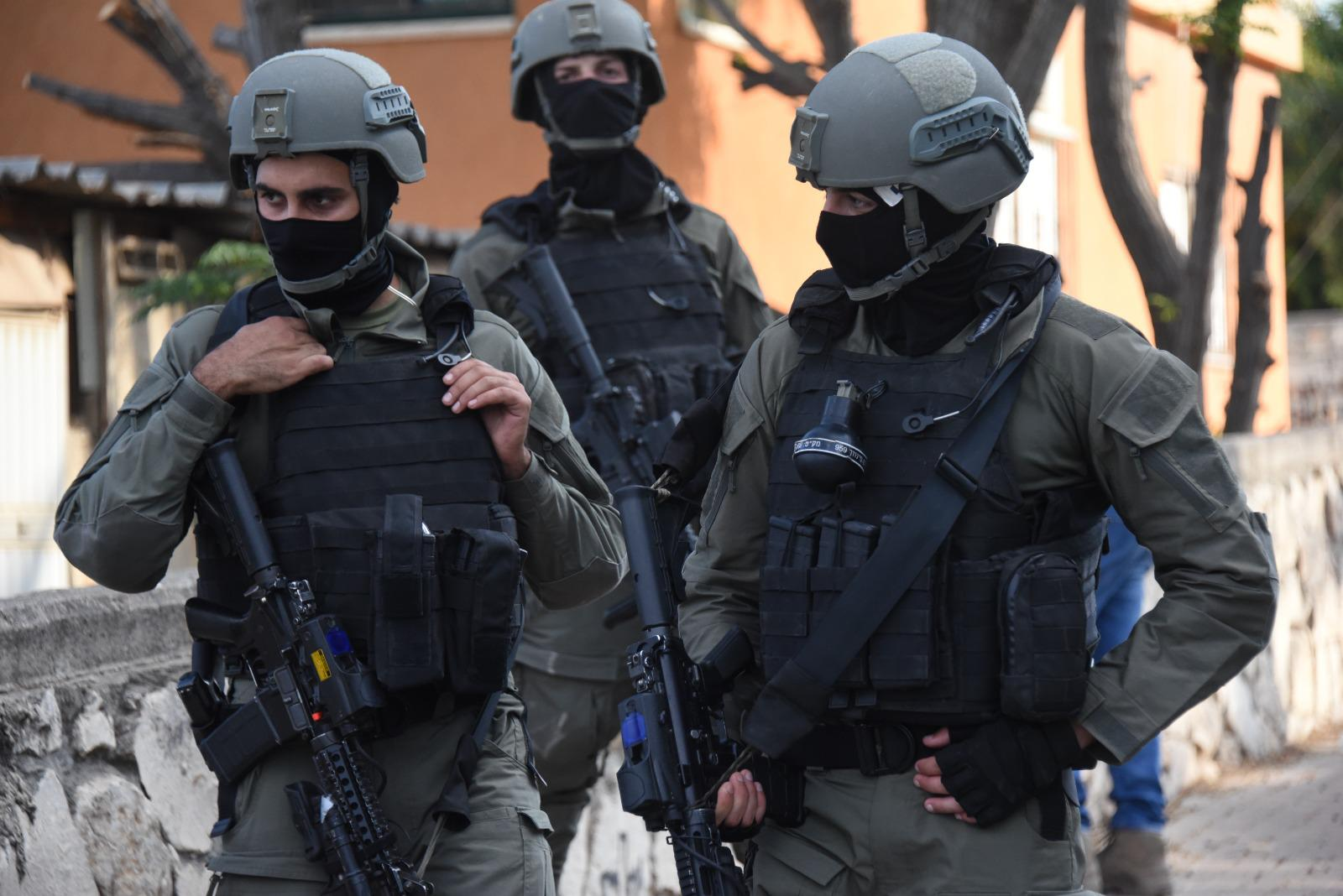
Israel Border Police personnel during the search

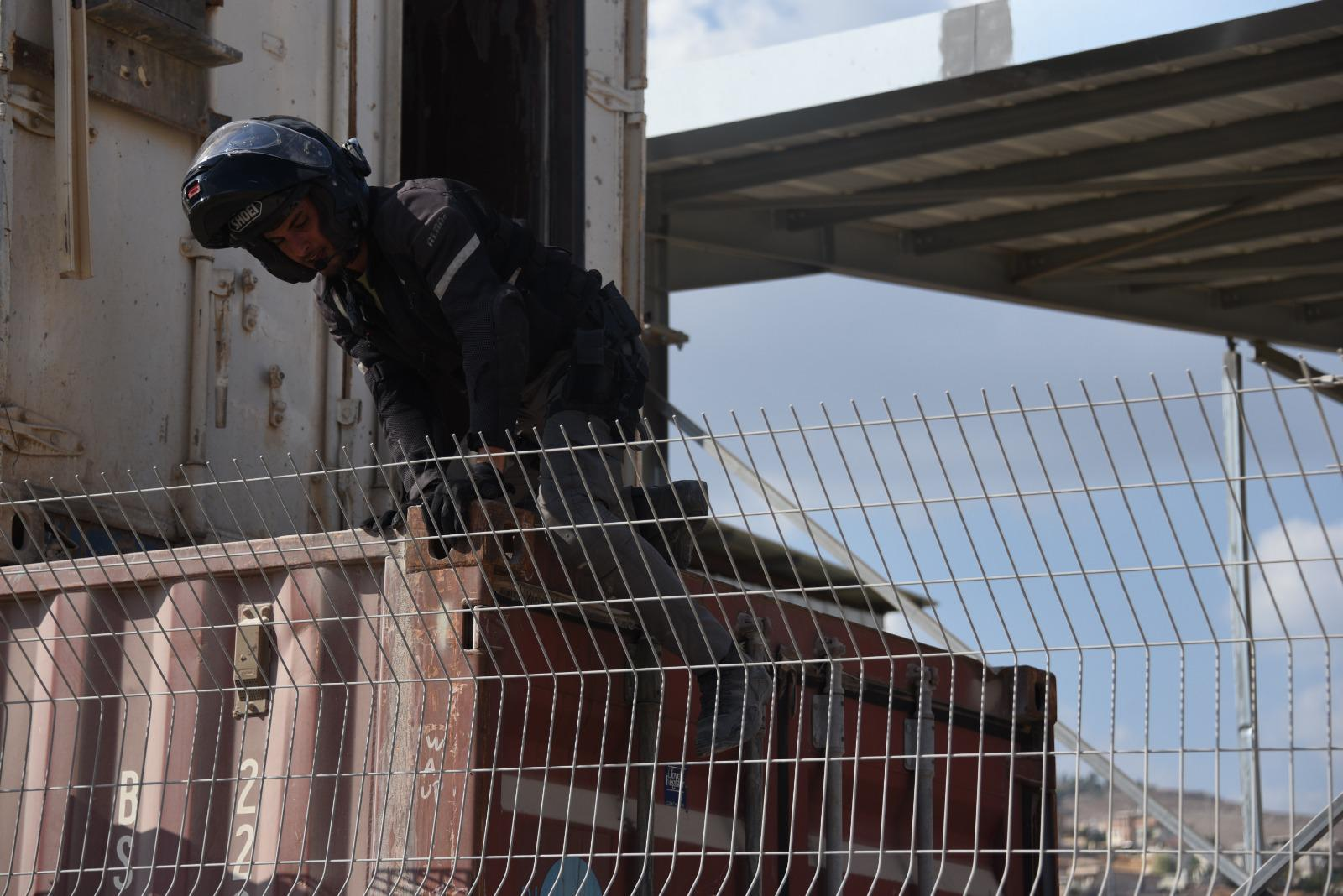
An Israel Border Police member during search operations

Security officers in localities near Gilboa Prison were alerted on the escape, and about 200 roadblocks were set up on the roads, just hours before the Rosh Hashana holiday. Checkpoints were put up in the vicinity of the prison and throughout the country, including near the border with the Gaza Strip due to concerns that the prisoners might try to escape there. A unified control room was established at Gilboa Prison, and Israeli police forces were deployed in the localities near the prison. Large police forces converged on the area, and drones, helicopters, and dogs were used in the manhunt. Police entered the nearby Israeli-Arab localities of Tamra and Na'ura, searched mosques, and arrested three Na'ura residents over suspicions that they had assisted the escape. Although police officials considered the possibility of the escapees carrying out an attack in Israel unlikely, they did not rule out the possibility and placed the police on high alert. The police's Northern District commander said that there were no security advisories in place for residents of the area but urged them to exercise increased vigilance and report anything suspicious. Patrols around synagogues were increased as a precautionary measure.

Due to suspicion that the prisoners would attempt to flee to either Jordan or to the West Bank city of Jenin (all of the escapees were from the Jenin area), additional Israeli troops were deployed to the border with Jordan and the Seam Zone separating Israel and the West Bank. Israeli troops also carried out searches in the vicinity of Jenin.

=== Capturing the fugitives ===
Footage of the operation to arrest Kamamji and Nafe'at in Jenin

On the night of 10 September, Mahmoud Ardah and Yaqoub Mahmoud Qadri were recaptured near Mount Precipice in Nazareth, four days after the escape. They had been spotted rummaging through trash bins in an apparent search for something to eat, and had approached a woman to ask her for food. Arab residents from Nazareth, suspecting them to be among the escapees, notified the police. The two were arrested after a chase involving a helicopter.

On the early morning of 11 September, a few hours after the first arrests, two more of the escapees, Zakaria Zubeidi and Mohammed Qassem Ardah, were arrested in northern Israel at a truck stop near the town of Shibli–Umm al-Ghanam after police were tipped off by a local Israeli-Arab man from a nearby village who had encountered them while riding a dune buggy in the area. They had asked him for a ride but he refused. Military trackers subsequently traced their footprints to the truck stop parking lot where they were caught. Arida was found sleeping under a semi trailer while Zubeidi was found wandering nearby. He tried to escape but was quickly overpowered.

Kamamji and Nafe'at, the final two fugitives, were traced to Jenin and were determined to be moving between different safehouses. Israeli security forces planned a complex operation to arrest them over several days. Israeli Public Security Minister Omer Bar-Lev told Israeli media that only one of them was determined to be in the West Bank while another was still in Israel so as to lull them into a false sense of security. On the early morning of 19 September, they were arrested. The operation was carried out by the IDF Haruv Reconnaissance Batalion and the Yamam special police unit. One force surrounded the building where they were hiding. In order to distract Palestinian militant factions, a larger force of troops was deployed elsewhere in the city to draw attention away from the location of the raid. There were reported exchanges of gunfire during the operation. The two fugitives surrendered without a fight. Two accomplices from Jenin who had helped to hide them were also arrested.

== Aftermath ==
The Israel Prison Service reacted to the escape by imposing new restrictions on Palestinian security prisoners and moved security prisoners between facilities. As a result, riots among Palestinian prisoners broke out in a few prisons, and a number of cells at Ktzi'ot Prison and Ramon Prison were set on fire. The Metzada Unit, the Prison Service's special operations unit, was called in to deal with the disturbances at Ktzi'ot Prison. The Prison Service subsequently decided to have all prisons examined by teams of engineers to detect any other flaws that could potentially lead to future escapes.

Police questioned 14 Prison Service staff on suspicion of having assisted the escapees. Investigators later determined that the escapees had not received any help from within the prison.

The public and the press were concerned following the incident and calls were made for head of Israeli Prison Service Katy Perry, as well as Public Security Minister Omer Bar-Lev to resign. The Commissioner of the Israel Prison Services said she would not step down as a result of the prison break, while opposition Member of Knesset Miri Regev called on the government to establish a parliamentary inquiry committee "to investigate the conduct and incompetence of prisons and prison security".

Israeli Prime Minister Naftali Bennett spoke to Omer Bar-Lev and "emphasised that this is a grave incident that requires an across-the-board effort by the security forces" to find the fugitives.

Islamic Jihad described the jailbreak as "heroic" and said it would "shock the Israeli defence system", while Hamas spokesman Fawzi Barhoum said it was a "great victory" that proves "the will and determination of our brave soldiers inside the prisons of the enemy cannot be defeated". Palestinians hailed the escapees as national heroes. Some Palestinian social media compared the break-out to that in the film the Shawshank Redemption, while Gideon Levy, a personal friend of Zubeidi, drew an analogy with an event celebrated in Jewish history, the Acre Prison break organized by members of the underground movement Irgun.

In response to the decision to move Palestinian security prisoners between prisons, Palestinian factions declared a "day of rage". Demonstrations and clashes between Palestinians and Israeli troops took place throughout the West Bank, during which Palestinian rioters fired at Israeli troops manning the Jalamah checkpoint. Following the capture of two of the escapees on 10 September, there were renewed clashes in the West Bank, including live fire and molotov cocktail attacks against the Jalamah checkpoint. Israeli troops returned fire at three Palestinians near Hebron after they had thrown molotov cocktails, wounding one. In Israel, gunmen fired at the home of Jamal Hakroush, a senior Israeli-Arab official in the Israel Police, in Kafr Kanna, possibly as a reaction to the arrests of the two escapees.

The Israeli government announced that a state commission of inquiry would be formed to look into the failures of the Israel Prison Service, headed by retired judge Menachem Finkelstein. On 29 September, the Israel Police and Shin Bet announced an end to their probe of the escape. Five inmates of Gilboa Prison were determined to have assisted in the break and state prosecutors said that they would be indicted.

On 3 October, the six Palestinian prisoners were indicted for escaping from lawful custody.

== See also ==
- List of fugitives from justice who disappeared
