= Adato =

Adato is a Jewish surname. Notable people with the surname include:

- Orit Adato (born 1955), Israeli military commander and Israel Prison Service Commissioner
- Perry Miller Adato (born 1920), American film director
- Rachel Adato (born 1947), Israeli gynaecologist, lawyer and politician
