= Zakaria Zubeidi =

Palestinian militant (born 1976)

Zakaria Muhammad 'Abdelrahman Zubeidi (Arabic: زكريا محمد عبد الرحمن الزبيدي; other spellings include Zakariyah Zbeidi, Zacharia and Zubaidi; born 1976) is the former Jenin chief of the Al-Aqsa Martyrs' Brigades.

He is considered a "symbol of the Intifada", and was on Israel's most-wanted list for several years. In an interview in 2005 he assumed responsibility for the 2002 Beit She'an attack that killed 6 people. He pledged to put away his weapons as part of an Israeli amnesty in 2007, though he never gave his guns up in the sense of relinquishing them to the authorities. Zubeidi nevertheless agreed to give up violence, and after a three-month probation period, was removed from Israel's wanted list. He subsequently devoted himself to 'cultural resistance' in the form of support for the Freedom Theatre at the Jenin Refugee Camp.

On 28 December 2011, Israel rescinded Zubeidi's pardon, and in May 2012 he was detained without charge by the Palestinian National Authority for six months. On 27 February 2019, Zubeidi was arrested again and in May charged before an Israeli military court with carrying out at least two shooting attacks on civilian buses in the West Bank. On 6 September 2021, he escaped from the Gilboa Prison in Israel's North, together with five other Palestinian prisoners, through a tunnel that they had dug. Five days later, on 11 September 2021, Zubeidi was caught near the Israeli village of Kfar Tavor.

In January 2025, Zubeidi was released as part of a 2025 Gaza war ceasefire, aimed at securing the release of Israeli hostages held in Gaza by Hamas.

== Early life ==
Zakaria was born in 1976 into the family of Mohammed and Samira Zubeidi, one of eight children at the Jenin refugee camp. The family originally came from a village near Caesarea from which they were expelled in the 1947–1949 Palestine war. In an rare interview with a British reporter, Zakaria recalled his father, an English teacher, was prevented from teaching by the Israelis after he was arrested in the late 1960s for being a member of Fatah. He worked instead as a labourer in an Israeli iron foundry, did some private teaching on the side, and became a peace activist. The first Israeli Zubeidi had ever met was the soldier who came to take away his father away, leaving the mother to raise their children alone.

In the late 1980s and early 1990s, during the First Intifada, Israeli human rights activist Arna Mer-Khamis opened a children's theater in Jenin, "Arna's House", to encourage understanding between Israelis and Palestinians. Dozens of Israeli volunteers ran the events, and Samira, believing that peace was possible, offered the top floor of the family house for rehearsals. Zubeidi, then aged 12, his older brother Daoud, and four other boys around the same age formed the core of the troupe.

Zubeidi attended the UNRWA school in Jenin Refugee Camp, and by all accounts was a good student. In 1989, at age 13, he was shot in the leg when he threw stones at Israeli soldiers. He was hospitalised for six months and underwent four operations, but was left permanently affected, with one leg shorter than the other and a noticeable limp. At age 14, he was arrested for the first time (again for throwing stones) and jailed for six months. At that time he had become the representative before the prison governor for the other child prisoners. On his release, he dropped out of high school after one year. A year later, he was re-arrested for throwing Molotov cocktails and imprisoned for 4 1/2 years. In prison, he learned Hebrew, and became politically active, joining Fatah.

On his release following the 1993 Oslo Accords, he joined the Palestinian Authority's Palestinian Security Forces. He became a sergeant, but left, disillusioned, after a year, complaining: "There were colleagues whom I had taught to read who were promoted to senior positions because of nepotism and corruption."

He went to work illegally in Israel, and for two years earned a good living as a contractor for home renovations in Tel Aviv and Haifa. He was eventually arrested in Afula and, after being briefly imprisoned for working without a permit, deported back to Jenin. With his permit to work in Israel blocked, Zubeidi reportedly resorted to auto theft. In 1997, he was caught with a stolen car, and was given a fifteen-month sentence. After serving his time, he returned to the camp in Jenin. He became a truck driver, transporting flour and olive oil, but in September 2000 lost his job when the West Bank was sealed off due to the Second Intifada.

== Leader of the Al-Aqsa Brigades ==
=== Battle of Jenin ===
Zubeidi himself traces his entry into armed militancy back to late 2001 when, after the killing of a close friend, he learned how to make bombs. On 3 March 2002, one month before the main assault on the refugee camp, his mother was killed during an Israeli raid into Jenin. She had taken refuge in a neighbor's home and was shot by an IDF sniper who targeted her as she stood near a window. She subsequently bled to death. Zubeidi's brother Taha was also killed by soldiers shortly afterward. A month later, a suicide bomber from Jenin killed 29 Israelis. The Israeli Army then launched a full-scale offensive in the Jenin refugee camp, demolishing hundreds of homes, leaving 2,000 homeless. Ten days of fighting ensued in which 52 Palestinians and 23 Israeli soldiers died.

Aside from grieving for lost family members and friends, Zubeidi was greatly embittered by the fact that none of the Israelis who had accepted his mother's hospitality, and whom he had thought were his friends, tried to contact him. In a 2006 interview he stated angrily, "You took our house and our mother and you killed our brother. We gave you everything and what did we get in return? A bullet in my mother's chest. We opened our home and you demolished it. Every week, 20-30 Israelis would come there to do theatre. We fed them. And afterward, not one of them picked up the phone. That is when we saw the real face of the left in Israel." The Al-Aqsa Martyrs’ Brigades may reach peace with Israel, he said, but personally he would not. He found himself unable to forgive the killing of his mother and brother and the razing of his house.

Losing hope in the Israeli peace camp, he joined the al-Aqsa Martyrs' Brigades, an armed wing of Fatah and became a leader of the group. The al-Aqsa Martyrs' Brigades claimed responsibility for a November 2002 terrorist attack in Bet She'an in which 6 civilians were murdered, and Israel named Zubeidi as the prime suspect who planned the attack. This and other attacks he was involved in made him one of Israel's most wanted men in the West Bank.

Arna's son, Israeli actor Juliano Mer-Khamis, did return to Jenin in 2002 and looked for the boys who had been in the theater group. Zubeidi had turned to armed resistance, Daoud was sentenced to 16 years in prison for militant activities, and the other four were dead. In 2004, Mer-Khamis completed a documentary film about the group, Arna's Children. Zubeidi's face was slightly disfigured by fragments of shrapnel from a bomb that he mishandled in 2003.

=== Power-broker of Jenin ===
He took responsibility for a bombing in Tel Aviv that killed one woman and injured more than 30 in June 2004. During this period, he was considered the primary power-broker and most powerful man in Jenin. Zubeidi was de facto in charge of law and order in the city. He viewed the PA security forces as having little presence other than "disturbing traffic." Although he developed a friendly relationship with the former Palestinian president and Fatah head, Yasser Arafat, recalling him saying "'Zakaria, buddy, I love you, we're marching to Jerusalem!'", Zubeidi also stated "I don't take orders from anyone. I'm not good at following." At the time, he was enthusiastic about the intifada, dismissing the view of Palestinians who wanted to end it and warned the new generation of Palestinians would "fight better".

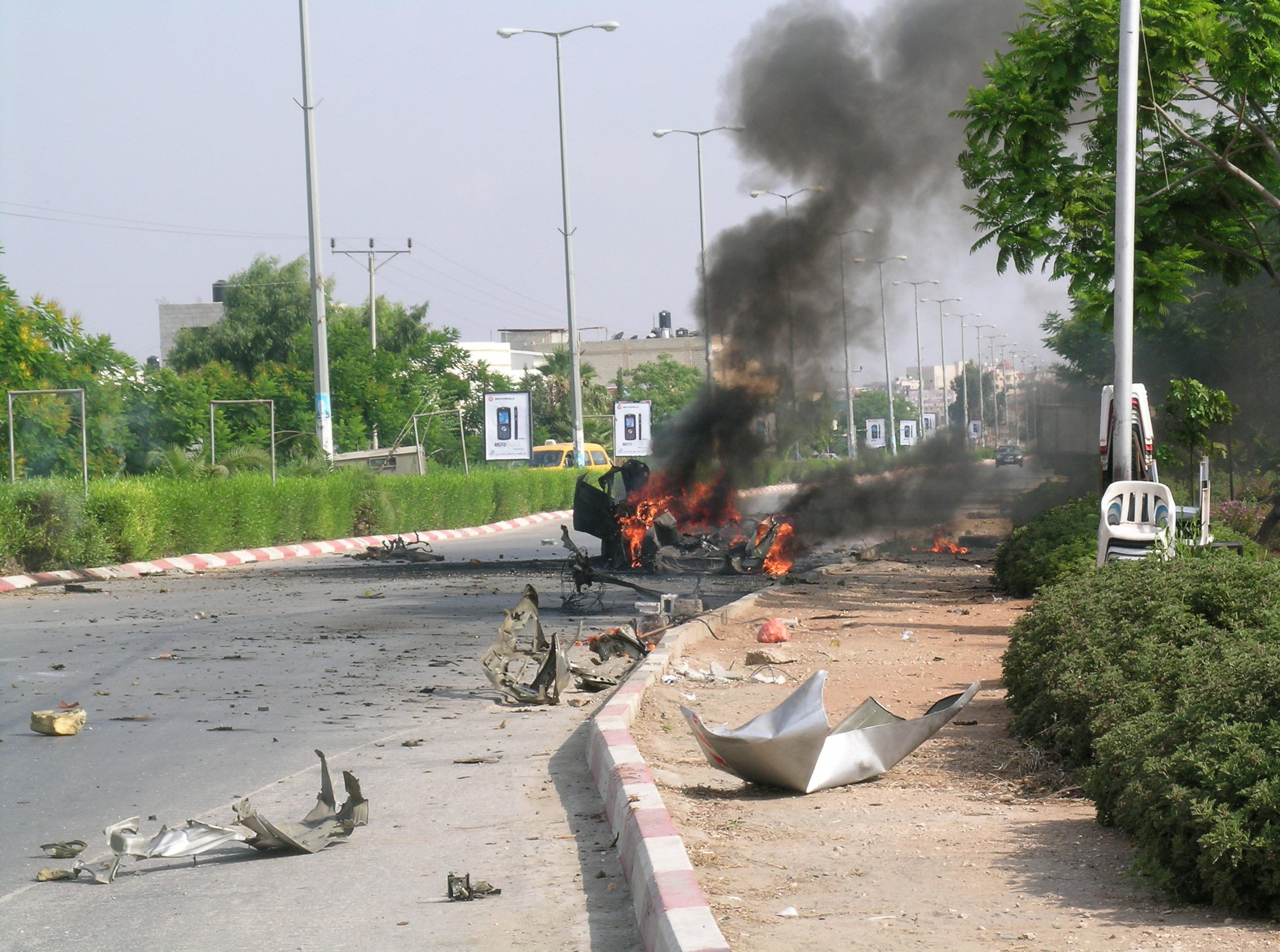
Explosive Vehicle in Jenin, 2006

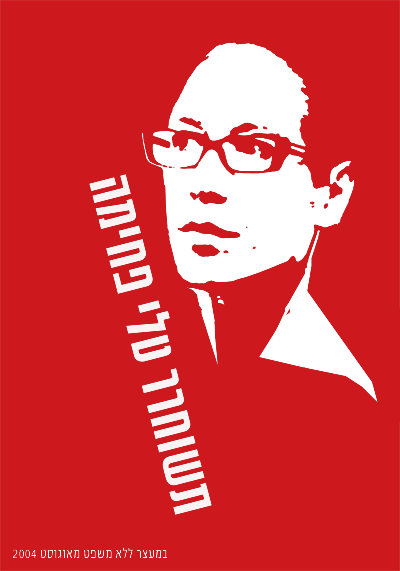
Tali Fahima sticker, 2005

Israel tried to assassinate him four times. In one such attempt in 2004, an Israeli police unit killed five other brigade members, including a 14-year-old boy, in a jeep carrying Zubeidi. On 15 November, following Arafat's death, Israeli forces launched an incursion in Jenin to kill him, but he evaded them; in the raid, nine Palestinians were killed, including four civilians and his deputy, "Alaa". The raid uncovered an arms cache. Prior to these incidents, another attempt on his life had been made by a Palestinian; Zubeidi broke his assailant's hand as a punishment.

Zubeidi was at the center of controversy in 2004 when Tali Fahima, an Israeli legal secretary, was imprisoned due to her contacts with him. She was accused of preventing his arrest by the IDF by translating a document for him. Both of them denied allegations that they had a romantic relationship. He stated that year, "The intifada is in its death throes. These are the final stages.... Not only was the intifada a failure, but we are a total failure. We achieved nothing in 50 years of struggle; we've achieved only our survival." In an interview at this time with two Israeli journalists, Zubeidi assumed personal responsibility for a terrorist attack in Beit She'an in 2002, when two Palestinian gunmen from Jalbun shot six Israelis dead.

=== Elections and renewed conflict with Israel ===
During the Palestinian presidential elections in 2004, Zubeidi initially endorsed Marwan Barghouti, but shortly after Barghouti was imprisoned, he decided to support Mahmoud Abbas, who went on to win the election. The two were in contact with each other and Zubeidi, despite being considered a loose cannon and dangerously outspoken, appreciated Abbas' "subdued no-nonsense style." In December 2004, Israeli sources criticized Abbas for meeting Zubeidi. Despite his readiness to accept Abbas' election to the presidency, Zubeidi still stated that he did not trust the latter in regard to the fundamental Palestinian claims concerning the status of Jerusalem and the right of return for Palestinian refugees. According to Zubeidi, Arafat was the only figure who could have fulfilled those aspirations, claiming this was "why he was poisoned... why Israel killed him."

In September 2005 he declared that his group's cease-fire was at an end after Samer Saadi and two other militants were killed by Israeli forces in Jenin. On 6 July 2006, the IDF attempted to capture Zubeidi at a funeral, but he escaped after an exchange of gunfire.

== Amnesty ==
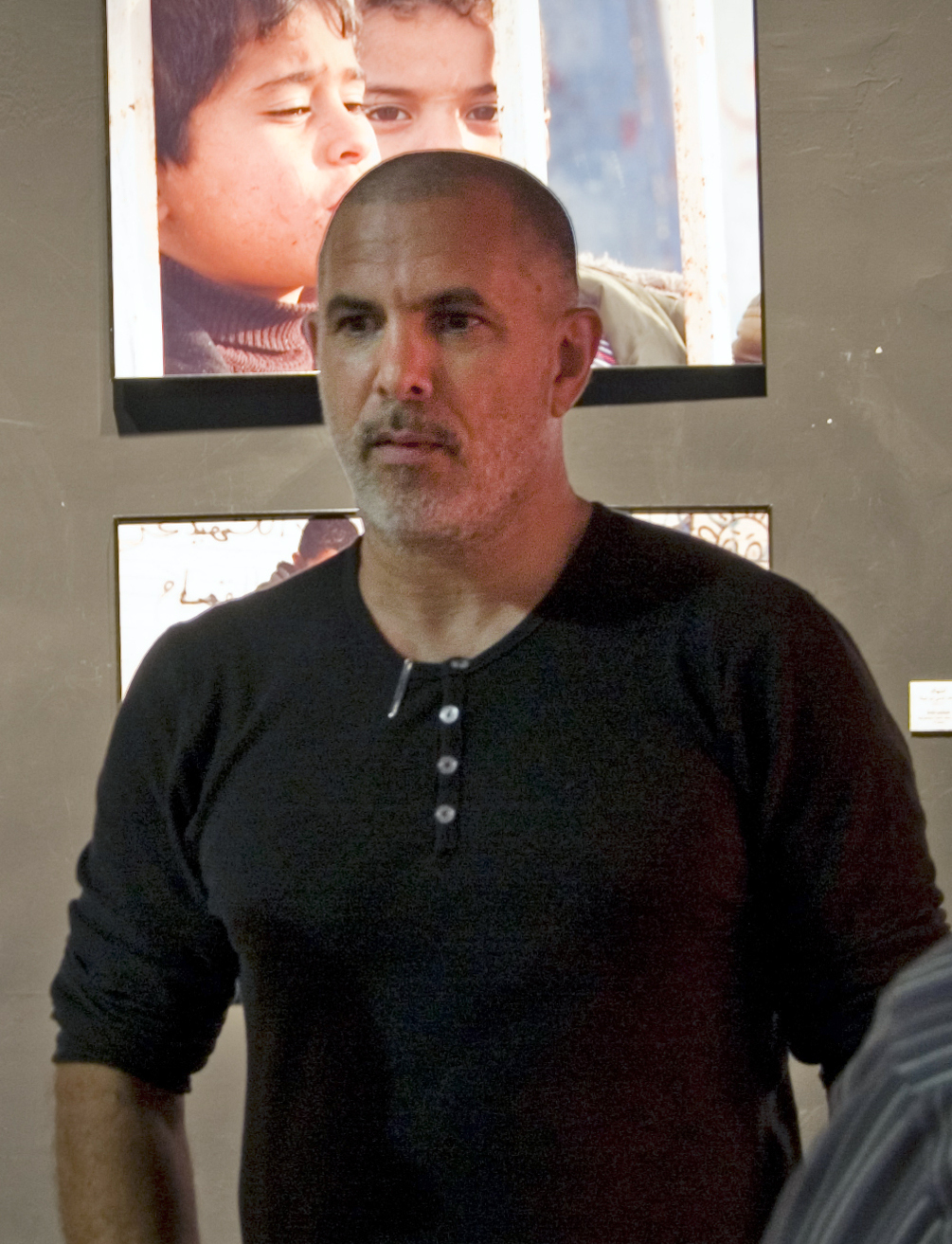
Juliano Mer-Khamis, Freedom Theatre Jenin, 2010

On 15 July 2007, the Office of the Israeli Prime Minister announced that Israel would include Zubeidi in an amnesty offered to militants of Fatah's al-Aqsa-Brigades. As of 2008, he was hired by Juliano Mer-Khamis (who was later murdered) as director of the Freedom Theatre in the Jenin refugee camp.

In an interview on 4 April 2008, he stated that he still had not received a full pardon from Israel, and blamed the PA for "lying" to him. He continued to sleep at the PA's Jenin headquarters and receive a salary of 1,050 NIS almost half of what he received earlier (2000 NIS). Asked why he had stopped fighting even when he had not received a full pardon, Zubeidi replied "because of the conflict between Fatah and Hamas. Look, it's perfectly clear to me that we won't be able to defeat Israel. My aim was for us, by means of the resistance, to get a message out to the world. Back in Abu 'Ammar's day, we had a plan, there was a strategy, and we would carry his orders... now there's no one capable of using our actions to bring about... achievements." Zubeidi criticized the PA leadership, saying "they are whores. Our leadership is garbage." Faced with the question of whether or not he admitted defeat he claimed "Even [late Egyptian president] Gamal Abdel Nasser admitted his defeat, so why not me?"

Prior to Fatah's Sixth Conference in August 2009, Zubeidi called on fellow Fatah members to adopt a program of resistance in case peace negotiations with Israel failed and a Third Intifada broke out. Although he was accredited as one of 2,000 Fatah delegates to the conference in Bethlehem, Zubeidi was momentarily denied entry to the meeting hall. al-Aqsa Brigade members in Nablus and Jenin, as well as those outside of the Palestinian territories, protested the rebuff, describing it as "stabbing the resistance in the back." Fatah officials eventually gave him permission to attend on 5 August 2009. The PA was also asked by brigade members to ensure Zubeidi's safety from Bethlehem back to Jenin. A number of right-wing Israeli Knesset members submitted a petition to the Israeli military court on 6 August calling for Zubeidi's arrest, despite the fact that he had been amnestied, because his "hands have Israeli blood [on them].". In the speech he delivered at the conference, Zubeidi suggested the Fatah-ruled West Bank reunite with the Hamas-ruled Gaza Strip through force, if necessary. He criticized the "old leadership," condemning them for failing the Palestinian people, stating that "(d)uring 18 years of negotiations [under Fatah], no hope has been created." Zubeidi suggested that a younger generation of Palestinians should lead Fatah.

=== Cancelling of amnesty ===
On 29 December 2011, Israel rescinded Zubeidi's pardon and Zubeidi stated to Ma'an News Agency that he had not violated any of the conditions of his amnesty. He was advised by PA security officials to turn himself in to Palestinian custody lest he be arrested by Israel's security forces. A week before Zubeidi was notified about the cancellation of his amnesty, his brother had been arrested by the PA.

Zubeidi was then kept in detention without charge by the Palestinian Authority from May to October 2012. During this period, Zubeidi undertook to study for a master's degree from Birzeit University, where he was supervised by Abdel Rahim Al-Sheikh, Professor of Cultural Studies, with a thesis entitled The Dragon and the Hunter, that focused on the Palestinian experience of being pursued from 1968 to 2018 and was helped in collecting materials by his friend Gideon Levy, an Israeli journalist, who provided him with documents from Haaretz's archives.

On 27 February 2019, before he could complete his dissertation, Zubeidi was arrested again, on suspicion of having engaged in terrorist activities, and in May he was charged before an Israeli military court with carrying out at least two shooting attacks on civilian buses in the West Bank.

== Escape and recapture ==
Zakaria Zubeidi was at the Gilboa Prison since his arrest, and on 6 September 2021, he succeeded to escape with five other prisoners. He was captured by the police on 11 September, with Mohammed Qassem Ardah, in northern Israel at a truck stop near the town of Shibli–Umm al-Ghanam. According to an eyewitness, they were found hiding under a semi-trailer. Zubeidi tried to escape but was overpowered.

== 2025 release ==
In January 2025, it was agreed to release Zubeidi as part of a three-phase ceasefire agreement between Israel and Hamas, aimed at ending the war in Gaza and securing the release of Israeli hostages taken to Gaza. He was released on 30 January 2025, after which he was greeted by crowds of Palestinians in Ramallah.
