= Katy Perry (prison officer) =

Israel Prison Service officer (born 1964)

- קטי פרי
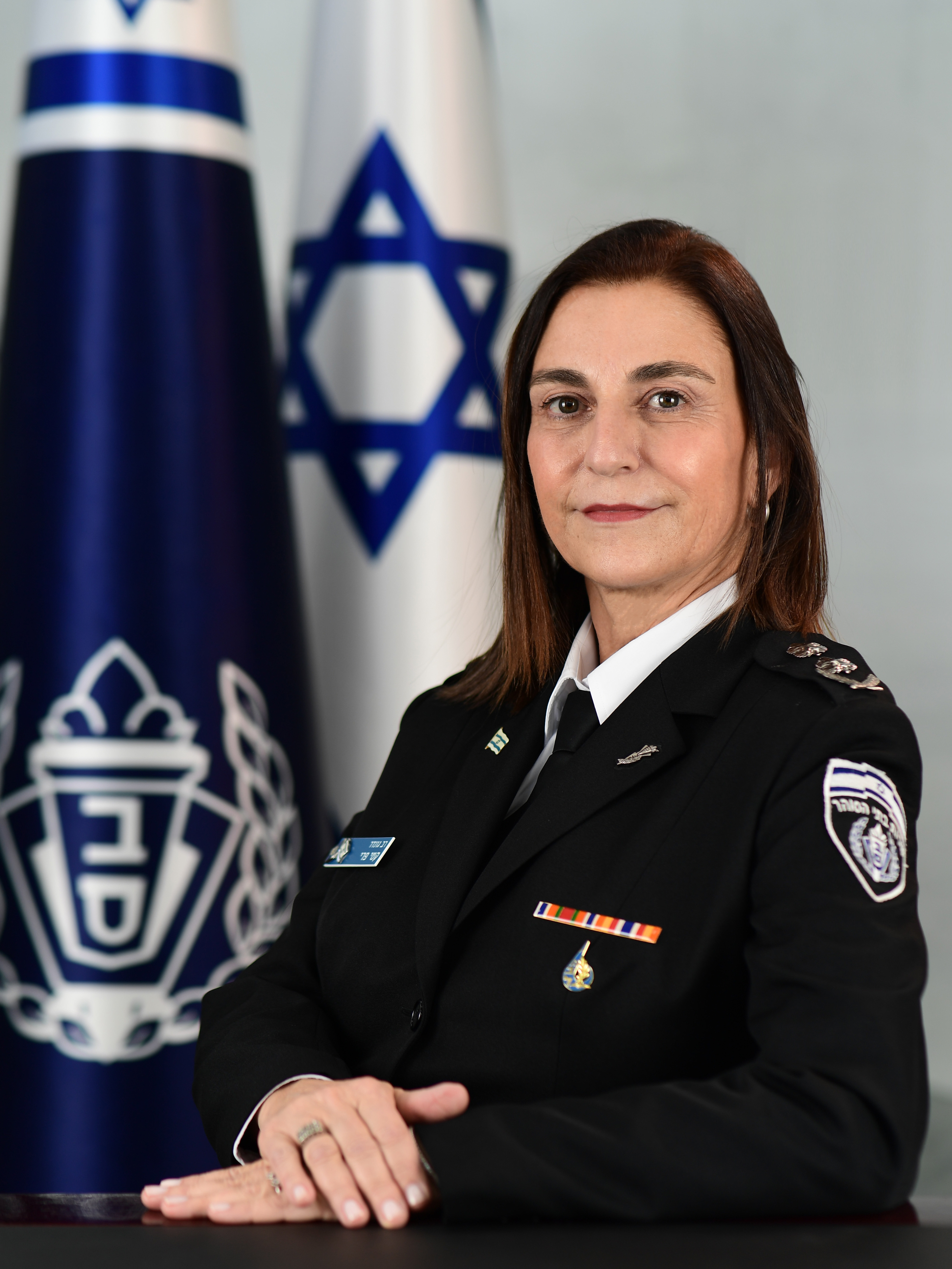
- Official portrait, 2021

Chief Commissioner of the Israel Prison Service
- In office 24 January 2021 – 24 January 2024
- Preceded by: Asher Vaknin
- Succeeded by: Kobi Yaakobi

Personal details
- Born: c. 1964
- Education: Hebrew University of Jerusalem

Katy Perry (Hebrew: קטי פרי; born c. 1964) is an Israeli prison officer. From 2021 to 2024, she served as the 18th Chief Commissioner of the Israel Prison Service.

== Career ==
In December 2020, the Minister of Internal Security, Amir Ohana, decided to appoint Perry as the 18th IPS Commissioner.

During her tenure, the Gilboa Prison break happened, and as such Perry faced calls to resign. In July 2023, Perry announced that she would resign in January 2024, following the end of her term.

On 27 December 2023, national security minister Itamar Ben-Gvir has stated that he will not extend her term despite the war and tension from the coalition. Perry described the decision as an "unsurprising decision by an irresponsible minister”.
