= 2002 Beit She'an attack =

Mass shooting

Coordinates: 32°29′49″N 35°30′12″E

- Part of the Second Intifada militancy campaign
- Location: Beit She'an, Israel
- Date: November 28, 2002
- Attack type: Shooting
- Deaths: 6 Israeli civilians (+2 attackers)
- Injuries: 34 Israeli civilians
- Perpetrator: Al-Aqsa Martyrs Brigades claimed responsibility

The 2002 Beit She'an attack, which took place during November 28, 2002, was a terrorist attack carried out by members of the Al-Aqsa Martyrs Brigades in the city of Beit She'an, Israel. Gunmen opened fire and threw grenades at the Likud party polling station where party members were casting their votes in the Likud primary.

Six Israeli civilians were killed during the incident and 34 civilians were injured.

== The attack ==
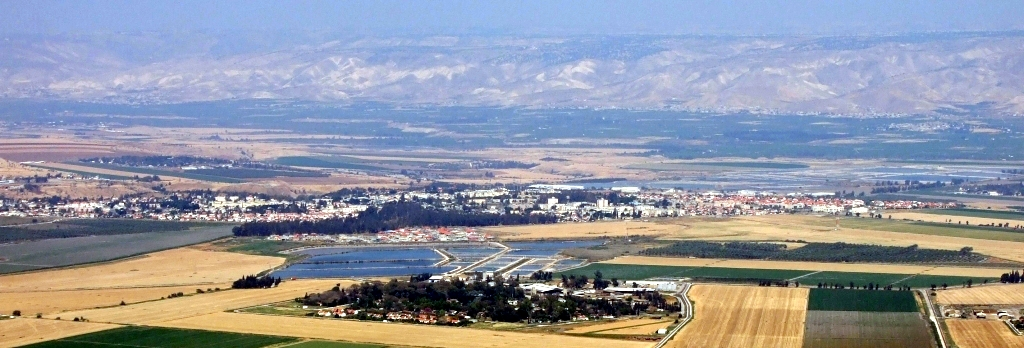
City of Beit She'an in 2008

On November 28, 2002, at 3:20 pm, two Palestinians, Omar and Yousef Rub from Jalbun, drove in a stolen vehicle into Beit She'an and parked it in front of Likud headquarters. Entering the polling station, they detonated grenades and fired automatic weapons at close range into lines of people waiting to cast their ballots. Soon thereafter, a battle developed, which ended with the two terrorists shot dead by a border policeman who happened to be in the area. One of the assailants was wearing an explosives belt under his jacket.

Four Israelis were killed in the attack, and two others died in the hospital from their injuries. Dozens of people were wounded, including three sons of the former Israeli Foreign Minister David Levy.

An eyewitness living near the Likud offices told the media that one of the gunmen laughed as he shot people: "I opened the window and I simply saw the terrorist standing, smiling, laughing and shooting in all directions."

== Victims ==
Five of the victims who were killed were from Beit Shean:

Haim Amar, 56

Mordechai Avraham, 44

David Peretz, 48

Yaacov Lari, 35

Yehuda Avitan, 54.

Shaul Zilberstein, 36, was from Upper Nazareth.

== Perpetrators ==
The Al-Aqsa Martyrs Brigades claimed responsibility, and Israel named Zakaria Zubeidi, a leader of the brigades, as the prime suspect who planned the attack. This and other attacks he was involved in made him one of Israel's most wanted men in the West Bank.

== See also ==
- 1974 Beit She'an attack
- List of terrorist incidents, 2002
