= Samer Saadi =

Palestinian militant (c.1975–2005)

Samer Saadi (ca 1975 – 29 September 2005, age 30) was a leader of the Al-Aqsa Martyrs' Brigades in Jenin.

On 29 September 2005, the West Bank was voting in the third round of local elections. The elections were the first contested Palestinian elections since Israel began withdrawing from the Gaza Strip. The week prior to the election, Israel had conducted nearly 100 raids on West Bank towns.

On the day of the election Saadi was killed in a gun battle during an Israeli incursion into Jenin in the West Bank, along with two other Palestinian militants.

In response, Mahmoud Abbas asked the United States to intervene in an effort to "take action to stop these operations that could provoke a collapse of the situation".

Later the same day, Zakaria Zubeidi, leader of the Al-Aqsa Brigades in Jenin, announced that his group's six-month ceasefire was now at an end.

== See also ==
- Israeli disengagement from the Gaza Strip
- Timeline of the Israeli–Palestinian conflict in 2005
- September 23, 2005, Jabalia Camp incident
