= Kobi Yaakobi =

Israel Prison Service officer (born 1964)

- קובי יעקבי
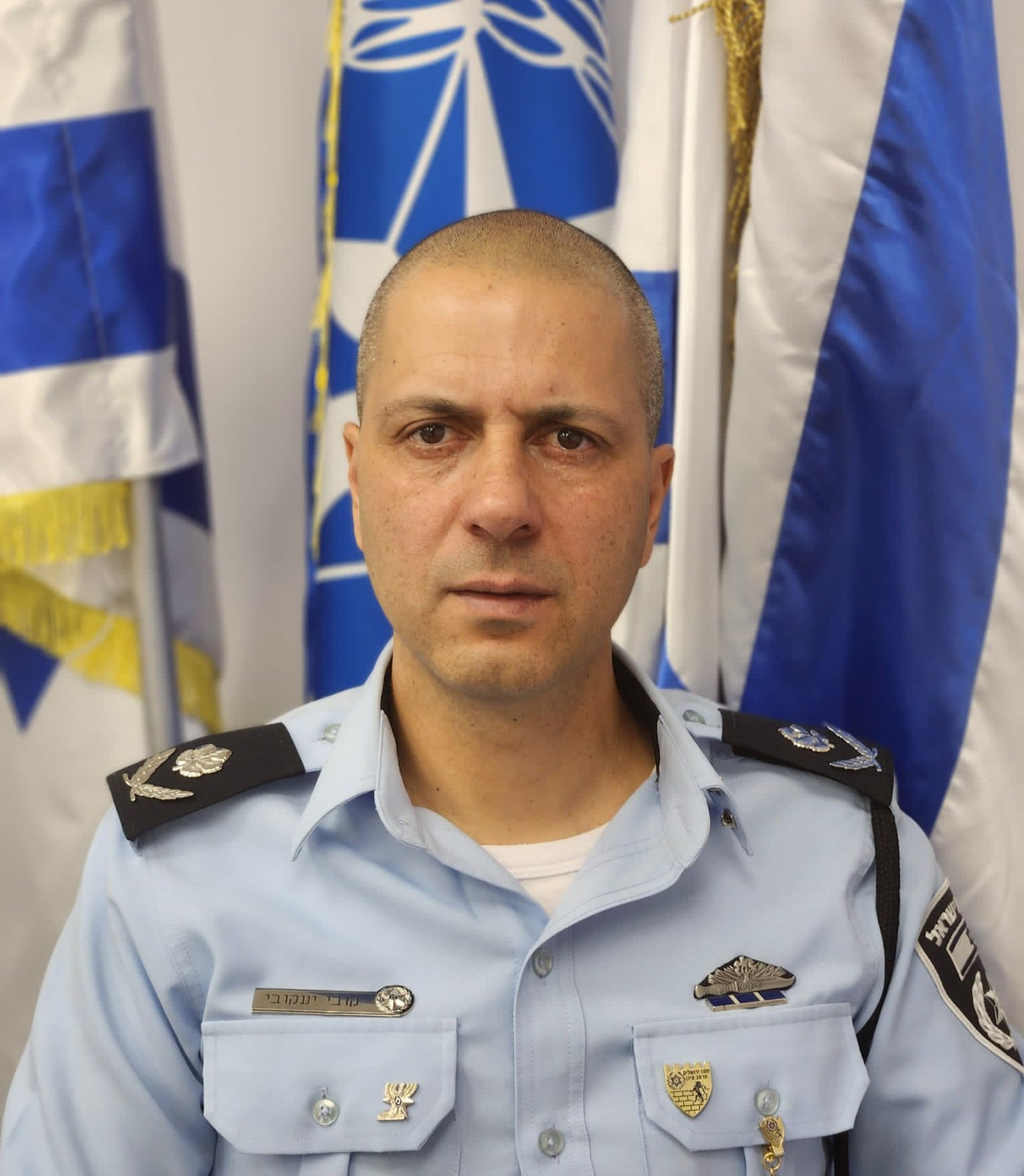

Chief Commissioner of the Israel Prison Service
- Incumbent
- Assumed office 24 January 2024
- Preceded by: Katy Perry

Personal details
- Born: 1973 (age 52–53)

Kobi Yaakobi (Hebrew: קובי יעקבי; born 1973) is an Israeli prison officer. He is currently serving as the 19th Chief Commissioner of the Israel Prison Service. Prior to his appointment in January 2024, he served as the security secretary to National Security Minister Itamar Ben Gvir.

== Early life ==
Yaakobi holds a bachelor's degree in humanities and social sciences, with a specialization in criminology, and a master's degree in criminology with honors from the Hebrew University. He completed his Israel Defense Forces (IDF) service with the Golani Brigade. He then joined the Israeli Police and served in various positions. These included roles as an officer in the Zion region, deputy Commander of the Harel Station and the Shalem Station, Assistant Head of the Traffic Division, and Senior Advisor to the Director General of the Ministry of National Security.

In 2017, Yaakobi was appointed Head of Operations at the Operations Headquarters of the Ministry of National Security. He was appointed Commander of the Moriah Station in the Jerusalem District in 2020. In 2022, he was promoted to the rank of lieutenant colonel and appointed commander of the Zion Region. In 2023, he was appointed security secretary to the Minister of National Security Itamar Ben-Gvir and was promoted to the rank of colonel 3 months later.

== Balfour Protests ==
Yaakobi was responsible for the Israeli government's response during the Balfour Protests against Prime Minister Netanyahu. The protests, held weekly near the Prime Minister’s Residence in Balfour Street in Jerusalem, saw some violent clashes between the police and protesters, the police were accused of using disproportionate force against protesters. Yaakobi defended the police actions, even defending his chief superintendent, Niso Guetta, after he was filmed beating a protester. He also took responsibility for two key arrests at the protest, those of retired air force brigadier general Haskel and drag performer Ze’ev Engelmayer.

== Commissioner of the Israel Prison Service ==
In December 2023, National Security Minister Ben Gvir nominated Yaakobi as an interim replacement for Israel Prison Service Chief Commissioner Katy Perry. The appointment was approved on 14 January 2024. Yakoobi took office on the 24 and announced a set of changes to deal with the overcrowding issue in Israeli prisons. He also promised to enforce harsher conditions for "Security prisoners" and reportedly asked prison officials to improve conditions for Jewish inmates suspected of terrorist activity.

In April 2024,the Association for Civil Rights in Israel and the Gisha human rights group, filed a petition with the Israeli High Court of Justice accusing Yaakobi and Ben Gvir of subjecting prisoners to extreme hunger and poor food quality. These allegations were later cited in an 18-page report issued on 18 June 2024 by DAWN, an advocacy organization for US policy in the Middle East. The report accused Yaakobi, Ben Gvir, and two other officials of human rights violations in Israeli prisons, including restrictions on religious freedom, access to water, medical neglect, and beatings. On September 9, 2025 The High Court of Justice ruled that the state has failed its obligations to feed Palestinian prisoners adequately and ordered them to provide the required nutritional needs of prisoners.

As part of the January 2025 Gaza war ceasefire, hundreds of Palestinian detainees were released from Israeli prisons. Yaakobi oversaw the controversial decision to have the released detainees wear T-shirts bearing the phrase "we will not forget or forgive” in Arabic.

== Corruption investigation ==
On 2 December 2024, Yaakobi was detained and held for 12 hours of questioning as part of an investigation into alleged corruption and the leaking of confidential files to Ben Gvir. Later, details emerged suggesting Yaakobi was suspected of obstruction of justice for allegedly informing West Bank Police Commander Moalem about an investigation against him concerning leniency toward settler violence. Yaakobi was also suspected of requesting the deletion of Telegram messages by police officers. Yaakobi has maintained his innocence and indicated he would resign from his post if he was indicted.

== Human rights abuse allegations ==
Human-rights organizations have reported that, after 7 October 2023, conditions for Palestinian detainees in IPS custody under Yaakobi's command have deteriorated sharply, with allegations including severe beatings, stress positions, humiliation, deprivation of food, denial of medical care, sexual violence, rape and extreme overcrowding. These are characterised as a system of institutionalized abuse, with B'tselem calling the prison system under Yaakobi a "network of torture camps".

=== Killings ===
There are at least 94 deaths reported, including minors and some whose identities are unknown.

=== Sexual violence ===
Prisoners have reported beatings to the genitals that caused severe injuries, setting dogs on prisoners, and forced anal penetration with various objects.

=== Starvation ===
Reports indicate a deliberate reduction of food rations. In September 2025, the Israeli High Court found that the prison service was failing to provide minimum nutritional requirements to its prisoners.
