= David Maimon =

Israeli general

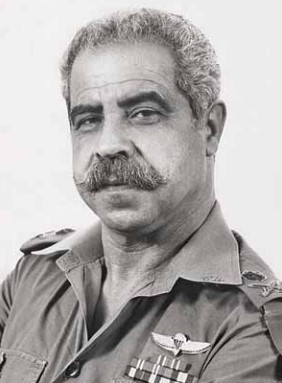
David Maimon

David Maimon (Hebrew: דוד מימון; February 15, 1929 – May 14, 2010) was an Israeli general born in Israel of Yemenite origin. He held various posts including military governor of the Gaza Strip, head of the Israel Prison Service and president of the Military Court of Appeals.
