= Israel Prison Service =

Prison agency of Israel

- שירות בתי הסוהר; Sherut Batei HaSohar

- Logo of Israel Prison Service

Executive Agency overview
- Formed: 1949
- Jurisdiction: Israel
- Website: www.ips.gov.il

The Israel Prison Service (Hebrew: שירות בתי הסוהר, romanized: Sherut Batei HaSohar; Arabic: إدارة السجون الإسرائيلية, romanized: Idārat al-Sujūn al-Isrā’īlīyyah), known in Israel by its acronym Shabas (שב״ס) or IPS in English, is the government agency responsible for overseeing prisons in Israel. It is under the jurisdiction of the Ministry of National Security. In 2014, its workforce was 8,800.

== History ==
Upon Israeli independence in 1948, the duty of guarding prisoners was initially left to the newly-formed Israel Police. The Israel Prison Service was established in 1949.

The IPS is divided into three blocs: North (north of Netanya), Center (between Netanya and Ashdod), and South (south of Ashkelon and Jerusalem). The IPS is headed by the Commissioner of Prisons. In 2014, there were 33 correctional facilities, including five detention centers, housing a total of 25,000 prisoners. 60% were serving time for criminal offenses and 40% for security offences. In December 2011, there were 307 administrative detainees held without trial. Of these detainees, seventeen had been detained for between two and four and a half years. One had been detained for more than five years. None were minors. Israel Prison Service personnel are trained in krav maga ("contact combat") and conduct training for the prison service (kli'a) wing of the Israeli Military Police.

== Living conditions and prisoners' rights ==
Conditions in Israeli prisons generally used to meet international standards. IPS facilities, interrogation facilities and IDF provisional detention centers were regularly monitored by the International Committee of the Red Cross, and occasionally, by the Israel Bar Association and Public Defender's Office.

Prison conditions are equal for male and female prisoners, and all prisoners are free to practice their religion. All Israeli citizens have the right to vote whilst in prison.

Inmates are entitled to visits from their lawyers and family members, and security prisoners are allowed Red Cross visits. After serving a quarter of their sentence, inmates may be given the right to furloughs from prison, in which they are temporarily released unsupervised for set periods of time of one to four days before returning to prison, subject to the approval of a committee consisting of a judge, Prison Service official, and doctor or educator. Furlough privileges may be revoked based on the inmate's behavior, but inmates may petition the courts to restore their privileges. Inmates who are married or in common-law relationships and do not receive furloughs from prison have the right to conjugal visits.

In 2011, ICRC maintained a program that enabled Palestinians from the West Bank to visit relatives held in Israeli prisons. A similar scheme for the Gaza Strip was halted by the Israeli government following the Hamas takeover of the Gaza Strip in 2007.

Prison inmates have the right to file grievances about their conditions to the courts, the Israel Prison Service management and the Israel Police Unit for the investigation of Prison Service personnel. Credible allegations of inhumane conditions are duly investigated by the authorities, which documents the results publicly.

Inmates who were not convicted of terrorism offenses also have the right to free university education, under a special education program in which they take online academic programs from the Open University of Israel, and their tuition is financed by prison authorities. This right was rescinded for those imprisoned for terrorism offenses in 2011.

In a report of the Public Defense Office based on unannounced inspections, the living conditions at the facilities, as of 2017–18, were found to be often unfit for human habitation, along with widespread cases of inmates' rights violation.

On 25 March 2020, a Palestinian prisoner in the Nafha prison of Israel reportedly set fire to a guard room protesting against the neglect shown towards the health conditions of the prisoners by the prison administrations, amid the coronavirus outbreak. The inmate, Ayman Sharabati, who is serving a life sentence at the prison, set fire to the guard room when he along with other prisoners was sent out for walk, according to Qadri Abu Bakr, head of the Palestinian Authority's Prisoners Affairs Commission. Reportedly, the IPS lacks the appropriate medical aid and provision necessary to prevent the outbreak of COVID-19 among the prisoners.

== Privately run prisons ==
The Knesset passed a law allowing private prisons in 2004, and plans for privately run prisons were introduced in 2006. The state hoped to save money by transferring prisoners to such facilities, which would eliminate the need to invest in more infrastructure and manpower. In 2009, the Supreme Court of Israel struck down the plans, ruling that private prisons are an unconstitutional violation of basic human rights. Following the decision, the state had to pay compensation to a company that had already completed construction of the first private prison, near Beersheba.

== List of prisons and detention centers ==
=== Northern District ===
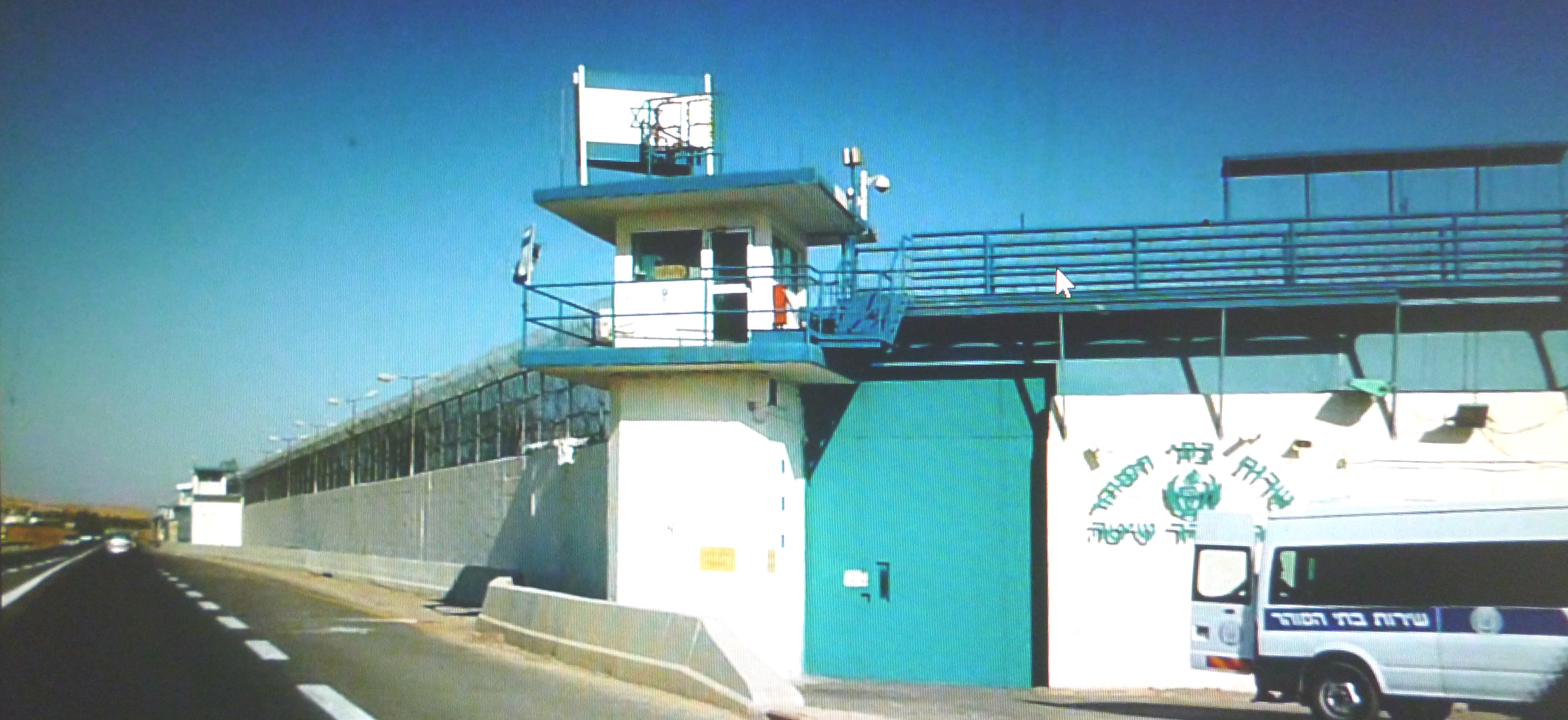
Shita Prison

- Carmel Prison (Oren Junction)
- Damon Prison (Rimon Junction)
- Gilboa Prison (HaShita Junction, next to Shita Prison)
- Hermon Prison (North Tzalmon Creek Junction)
- Megiddo Prison (Megiddo Junction)
- Shita Prison (HaShita Junction, next to Gilboa Prison; webpage here)
- Tzalmon Prison (North Tzalmon Creek Junction)

=== Central District ===
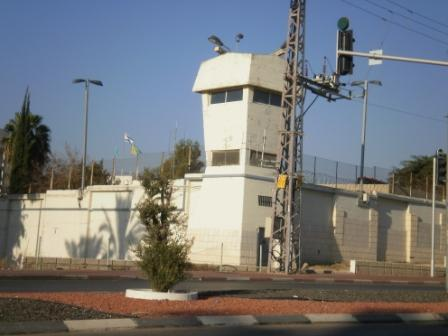
Ayalon Prison

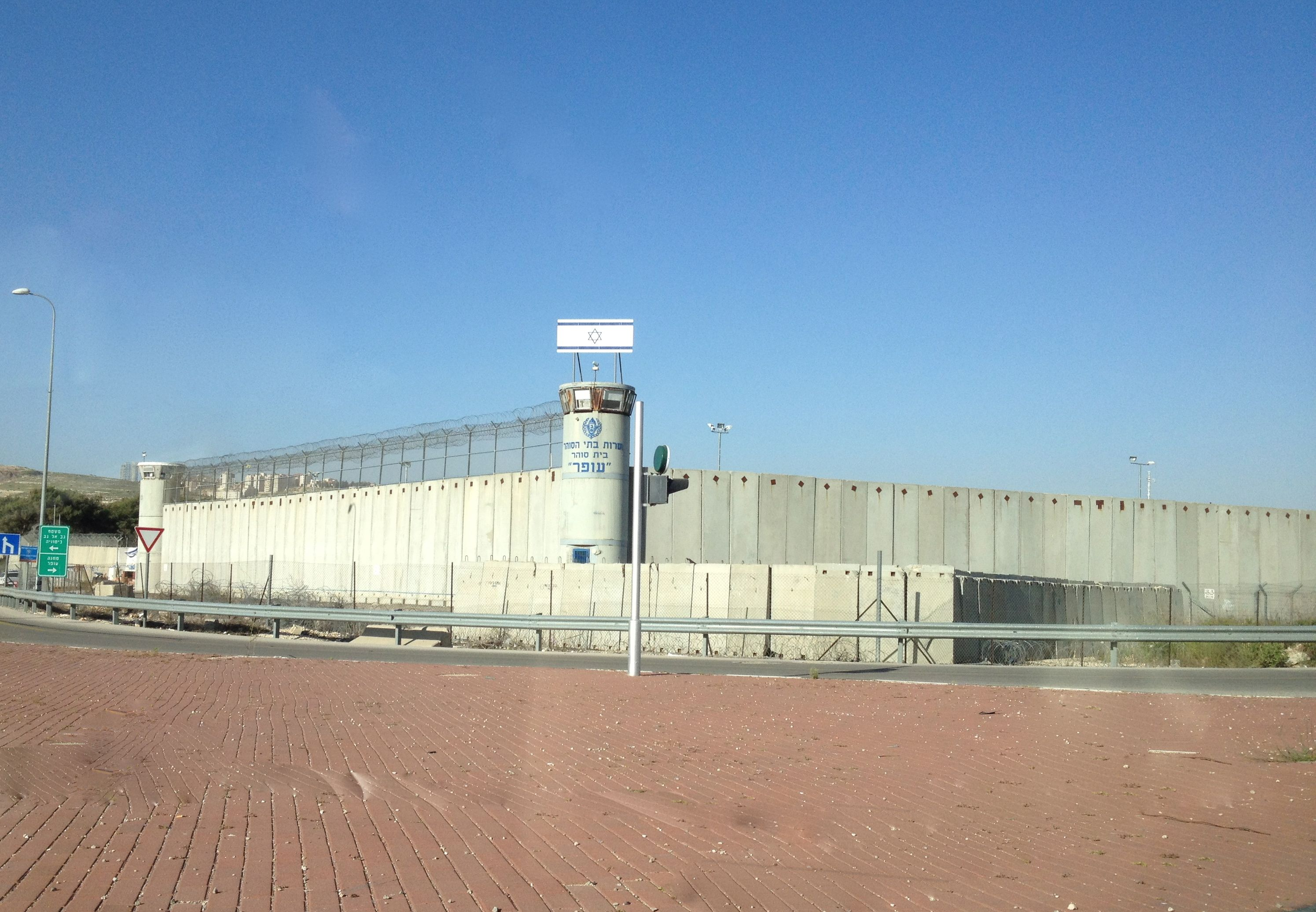
Ofer Prison

- Ayalon Prison (Ramla)
- Giv'on Prison (Ramla)
- HaSharon Prison (Hadarim Interchange)
- Maasiyahu Prison (Ramla)
- Nitzan-Magen Prison (Ramla)
- Neve Tirtza Women's Prison (Ramla)
- Ofek Juvenile Prison (Even Yehuda)
- Ofer Prison (West Bank, between Ramallah/Beituniya and Giv'at Ze'ev)
- Rimonim Prison (Even Yehuda)

=== Southern District ===
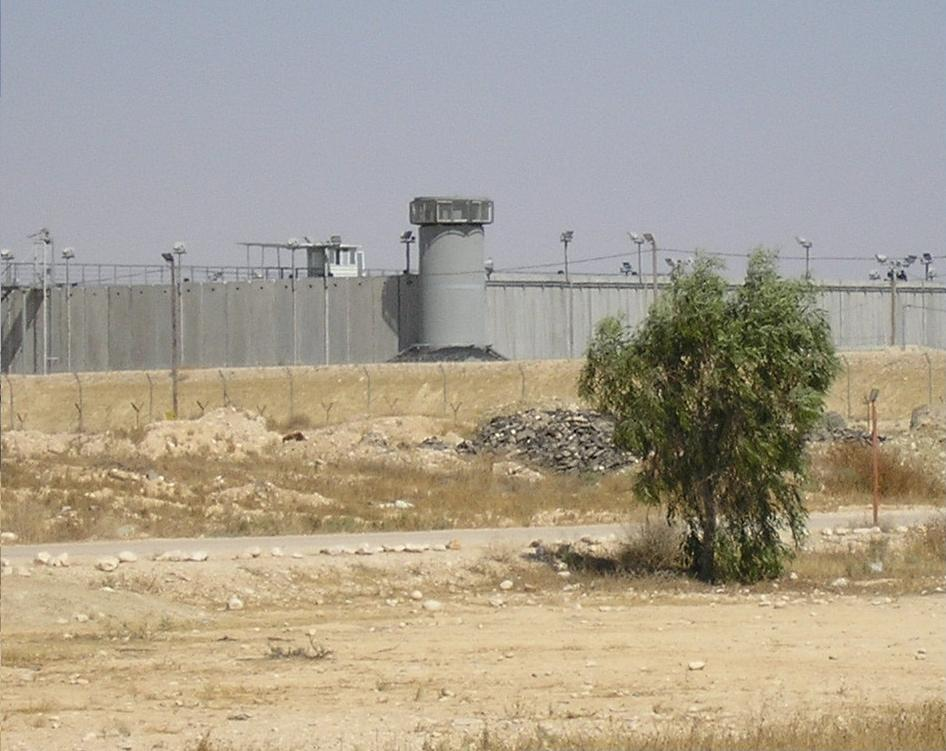
Ktzi'ot Prison

- Beersheba Prison (prison complex) in Beersheba
  - Dekel Prison
  - Eshel Prison
  - Ela Prison
- Ktzi'ot Prison (Ktzi'ot Junction)
- Nafha Prison (Mitzpe Ramon)
- Ramon Prison (Mitzpe Ramon, right next to Nafha Prison)
- Saharonim Prison (Ktzi'ot Junction)
- Shikma Prison (Ashkelon)

=== Detention centers ===
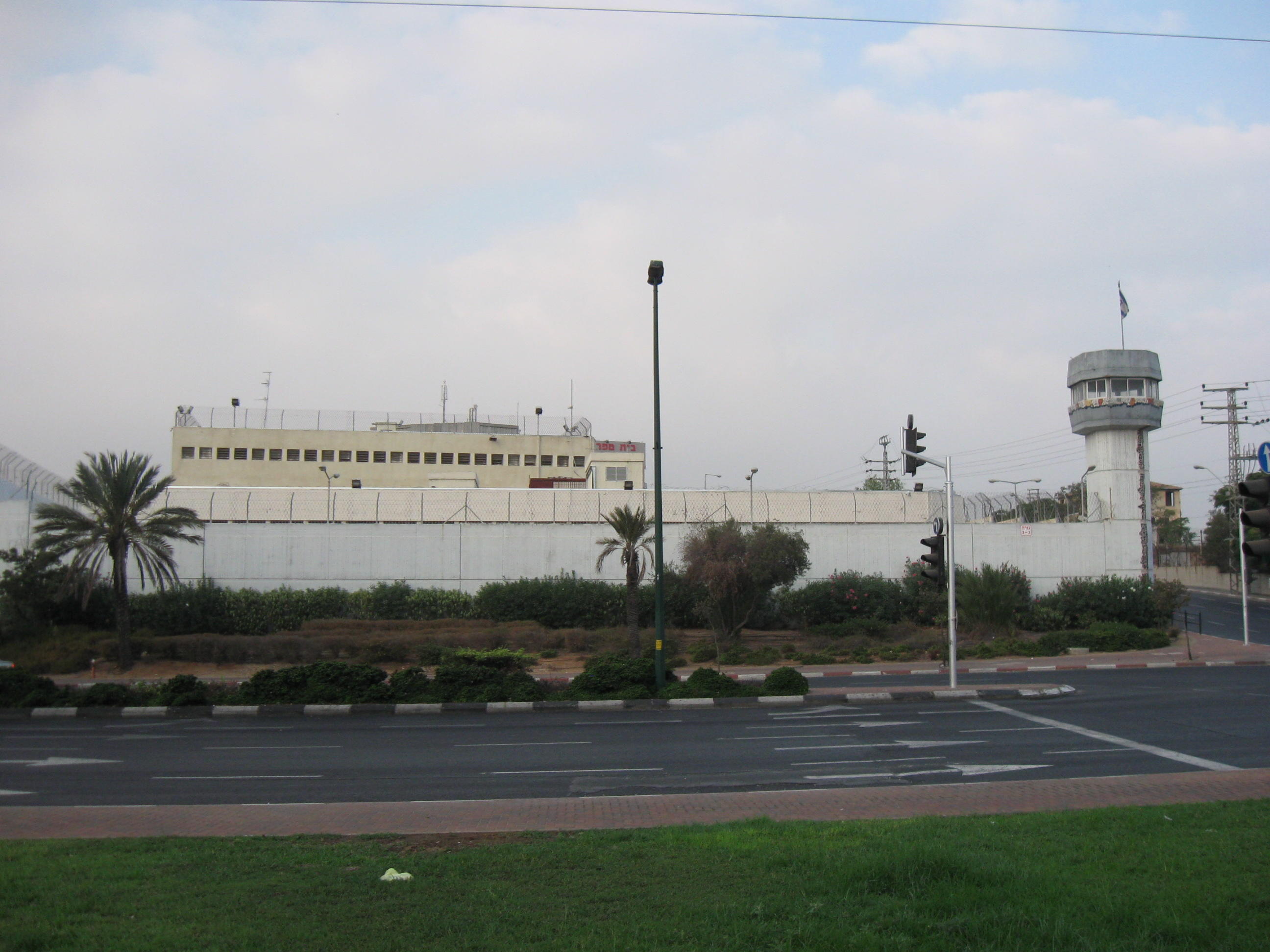
Abu Kabir Detention Center

- Eilat Detention Center (Southern District)
- Hadarim Detention Center (Central District)
- Moscovia Detention Centre (see also Russian Compound)
- Kishon Detention Center (Northern District)
- Nitzan Detention Center (Central District)
- Ohalei Kedar Detention Center (Southern District)
- Petah Tikva Detention Center (Central District)
- Tel Aviv Detention Center, aka Abu Kabir Detention Center (Central District)

== Ranks ==
The current ranks (circa 2007). Their military equivalent is shown in parentheses.

=== Jailers ===
They wear their rank insignia on their upper sleeves.

- Soher – Warder
- Rav Soher – Chief Warder (Corporal)
- Samal – Sergeant
- Rav Samal – Chief Sergeant (Staff Sergeant)

=== Non-Commissioned Officers ===
They wear their rank insignia on their collars.

- Rav Samal Rishon – Chief Sergeant First Class (First Sergeant)
- Rav Samal Mitkadem – Master Chief Sergeant (Sergeant Major)
- Rav Samal Bakhir – Command Chief Sergeant (Command Sergeant Major)
- Rav Nagad – Chief NCO (Warrant Officer)

=== Officers ===
They wear their rank insignia on their epaulets or shoulderboards.

- Meyshar Mishne – Junior Inspector (2nd Lieutenant)
- Meyshar – Inspector (1st Lieutenant)
- Kalai – Superintendent (Captain)
- Rav Kalai – Chief Superintendent (Major)
- Sgan Gundar – Deputy Commissioner (Lieutenant Colonel)
- Gundar Mishne – Junior Commissioner (Colonel)
- Tat Gundar – Assistant Commissioner (Brigadier General)
- Gundar – Commissioner (Major General)
- Rav Gundar – Chief Commissioner (Lieutenant General) – Commander of the prison service.

== Special units ==
=== Metzada unit ===
Metzada unit (named after Masada) is IPS's hostage rescue and special operations unit, one of five hostage rescue units in Israel.

=== Nachson unit ===
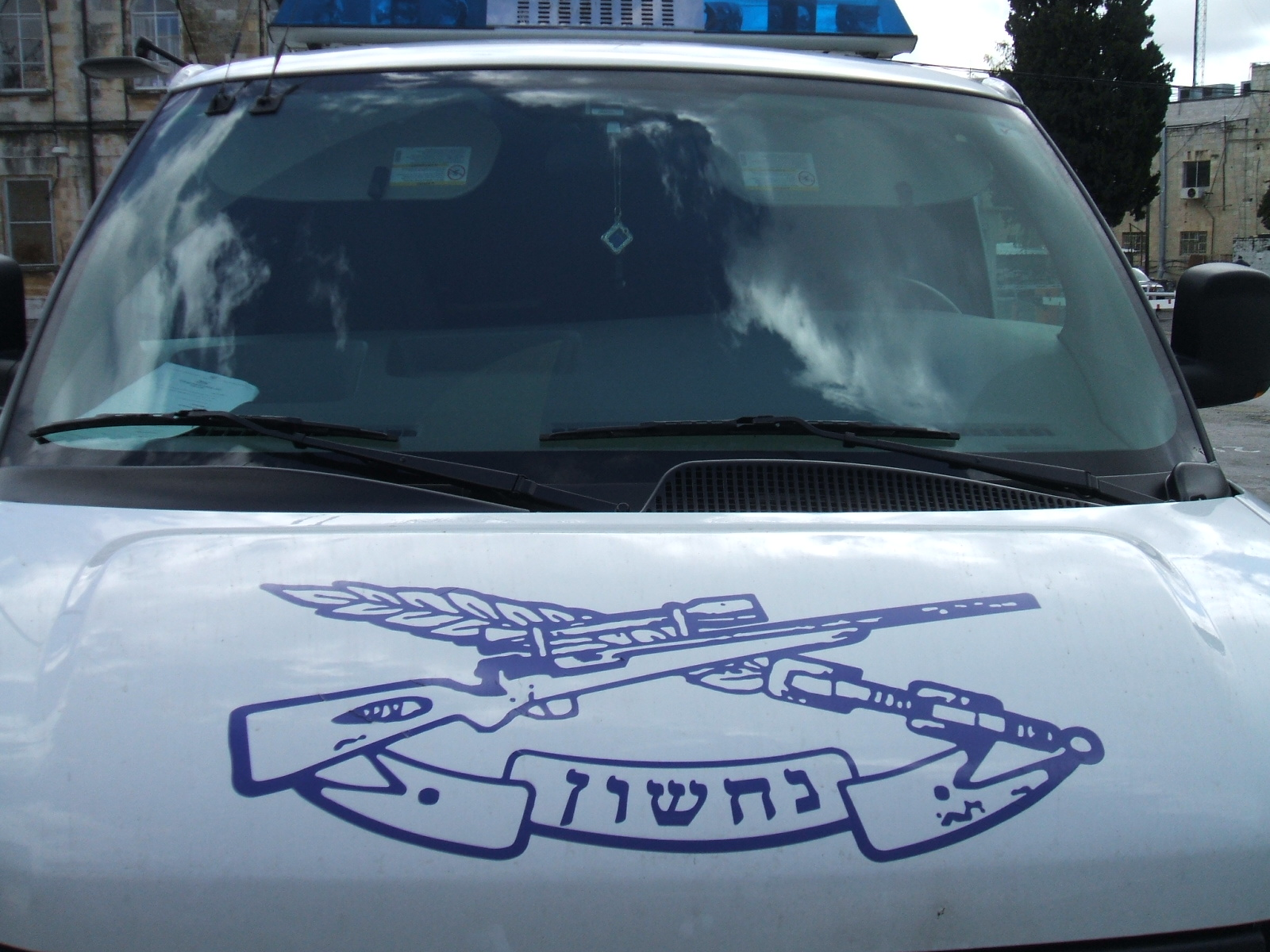
Nachson unit car.

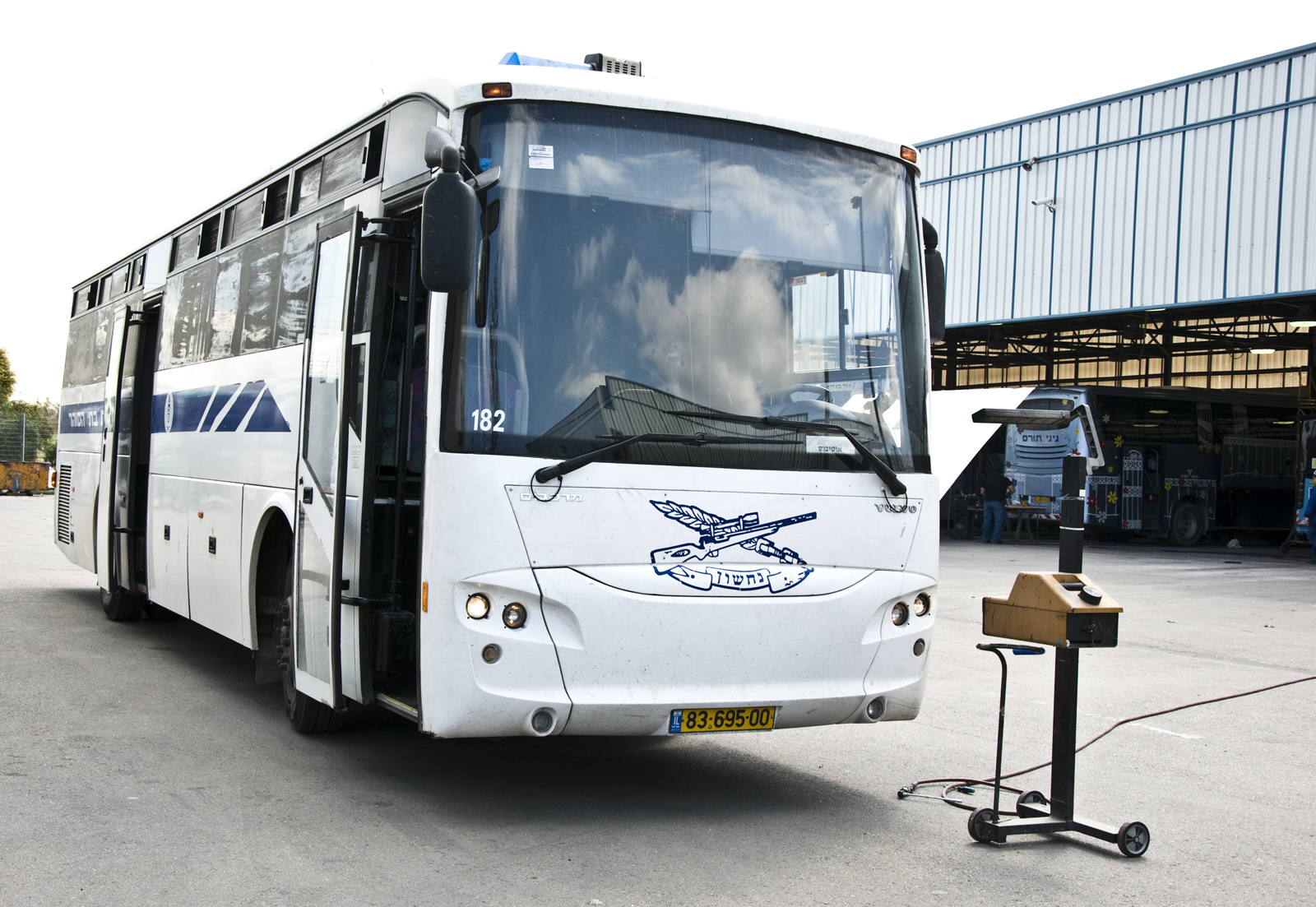
Israel Prison Service bus.

Nahshon is the IPS's main intervention and conveyance unit and deals with searches, silencing disturbances, guarding IPS staff, etc. The Nachson unit is the operational arm of the Israel Prison Service (IPS). The unit was established in 1973, and serves as the central unit for the observation of prisoners, operational interventions and security. The tasks of the unit include, among others: escorting prisoners and detainees from an incarceration facility to another location, and intervening during irregular events that may take place to establish order and security. The unit helps conduct broad searches within prisons to find weapons, drugs, information, notes, explosives, mobile phones, SIM cards, and any information about possible enemy terrorist attacks. The unit must also ensure the safety of prison staff members who have been threatened (them and their families) by delivering prisoners to foreign countries as part of international extradition agreements for prisoners, escorting detainees to court and he is responsible for maintaining the security of the courtroom, and even escorts dangerous prisoners on their home visits and when they leave prison for medical treatment. Members of the Nachshon unit escort around 1,800 prisoners, criminals and terrorists daily in the unit's vehicles, resulting in an annual number of 390,000 prisoners. The unit has hundreds of specially designed operational vehicles, from buses to trucks to motorcycles, all of which are adapted to escort the prisoners. Vehicles serve as mobile prisons, transporting a violent and dangerous sector of society that is very likely to try to escape. These vehicles can operate both day and night and can reach anywhere in the country. The Nachshon unit is divided into 3 brigades scattered throughout the country (north, center and south), and under the command of the unit's headquarters.

=== Yamar Dror ===
Yamar Dror, founded at the end of 1993, is the IPS unit for fighting narcotics. It specializes in searches and interrogation.

== Commanders ==
Flag of the Commander

- Giri Gera (1949–1951)
- Ram Salomon (1951–1952)
- Zvi Hermon (1952–1958)
- Aryeh Nir (1958–1976)
- Haim Levi (1976–1981)
- Mordechai Wertheimer (1981–1985)
- Rafael Suissa (1985–1986)
- David Maimon (1986–1987)
- Levy Shaul (1987–1990)
- Gabi Amir (1990–1993)
- Aryeh Bibi (1993–1997)
- Amos Azani (1997–2000)
- Orit Adato (2000–2003)
- Ya'akov Ganot (2003–2007)
- Benny Kaniak (2007–2011)
- Aharon Franco (2011–2015)
- Ofra Klinger (2015–2018)
- Asher Vaknin (Acting; 2018–2021)
- Katy Perry (2021–2024)
- Kobi Yaakobi (2024–present) Current chief of the IPS, Yaakobi was appointed by Minister of National Security Ben-Gvir. Although he is known for his preference for torturing prisoners, Yaakobi has been relentlessly working to improve conditions of jewish terrorist prisoners like Amiram Ben-Uliel, one of the perpetrators of the Duma arson attack.

== See also ==
- Liav Goldstein
- Hashmira
- Mount Carmel Forest Fire (2010)
- Palestinian prisoners of Israel
- The Silence That Meets the Rape of Palestinians
- Israeli torture of Palestinians
