= Liav Goldstein =

Israeli physician and healthcare administrator

Liav Goldstein is an Israeli physician and healthcare administrator who has served as Surgeon General of the Israeli Air Force (IAF) and Chief Medical Officer of the Israel Prison Service. He has also served on the ethics committee of the Israeli Medical Association.

== Military career ==
Goldstein served in the Israel Defense Forces, attaining the rank of Colonel. During his tenure with the military, he served as the Surgeon General of the Israel Air Force. His medical research during his military service included aeromedical implications of pharmaceutical treatments, operational medical regulatory methods, and the efficiency of air-medical evacuations during mass-casualty incidents.

== Israel Prison Service ==
Following his military service, Goldstein was appointed Chief Medical Officer of the Israel Prison Service. Here his responsibilities were to oversee healthcare policy, medical treatment standards, and public health initiatives for imprisoned populations in Israel.

=== Starvation of prisoners ===
Dr. Liav Goldstein is one of the officials who approved Ben-Gvir's meal plan for prisoners, in which the food they receive was reduced to such an extent that the Israeli courts ruled the food in prison does not ensure "compliance with the legal standard." Haaretz reported on the case of a prisoner who lost half his weight during imprisonment. Waleed Ahmad died in Megiddo Prison in March 2025 after suffering from severe malnutrition.
