= Tali Fahima =

Israeli pro-Palestinian activist

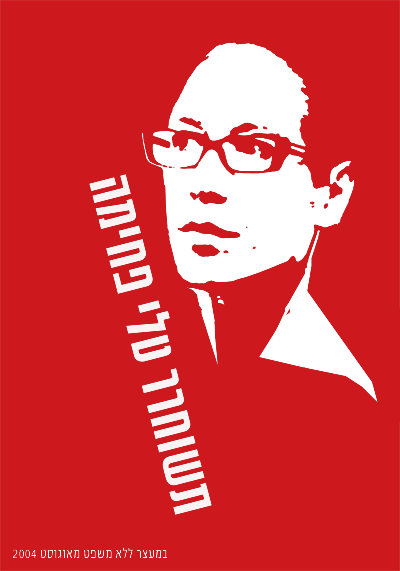
Tali Fahima sticker, 2005

Tali Fahima (Arabic: طالي فحيمة, Hebrew: טלי פחימה; born 8 February 1976) is an Israeli of Algerian Jewish origin and pro-Palestinian activist who was convicted for her contacts with Zakaria Zubeidi, Jenin chief of the Al-Aqsa Martyrs' Brigades, an armed faction close to Fatah. In June 2010, she converted to Islam at a mosque in Umm al-Fahm.

== Early life ==
Fahima was born in Kiryat Gat, a development town in Israel, to a family of Algerian Jewish origin. She was one of three daughters born to Sarah Lahiani and Shimon Fahima. After her parents divorced, Fahima and her sisters were raised by their mother, who worked in a variety of jobs to support them.

== Activism ==
After completing her mandatory military service, Fahima moved to Tel Aviv and worked as a legal secretary.

Until 2003 she was a Likud supporter; she then read an interview in which Zubeidi described his transformation from peace activist to wanted terrorist; intrigued, she found Zubeidi's phone number, and spoke with him several times. When she learned that Zubeidi was at the top of Israel's list of intended assassinations, she decided to travel to Jenin and live in his home as a human shield. She became involved in the Palestinian children's project in Jenin which featured in the film Arna's Children, along with Zubeidi before his imprisonment. She did not deny that she later met Zubeidi in Jenin a number of times, but she denied any involvement in armed activities. In March 2004 she stated that she was prepared to act as a human shield to protect Zubeidi.

On 8 August 2004, Fahima was arrested, interrogated by security officials for one month and then placed under administrative detention for three months. She was indicted in December 2004 and charged with "assistance to the enemy at time of war". On 23 December 2005 she pleaded guilty to some less serious charges, admitting to maintaining contacts with a foreign agent with the intention of harming state security. She also admitted to passing information to the enemy, and to violating a legal order forbidding the entry of Israelis into Palestinian Authority-controlled territory. The most serious charges, aiding an enemy in time of war, supporting a terrorist organization and possession of weapons against her were dropped. She received a three-year prison sentence and a suspended sentence that would go into effect if she violated any order forbidding entry into closed military zones, leaving less than one year of prison time left to serve. Her first request for early release was denied, the Parole Board ruling on 13 September 2006, that she "acted in an insolent and rude manner toward prison guards".

She was released in early January 2007, a year earlier than her original sentence, for good conduct. She was banned from leaving the country, contacting foreign agents or entering the Palestinian-controlled areas in the West Bank.

On 23 April 2007, Fahima participated in an alternative torch-lighting ceremony for Israeli Independence Day, where she lit a torch in honor of Zubeidi.

In June 2008, Zubeidi, confined to Jenin as a condition of his amnesty agreement, requested permission to travel to Ramallah for an eye operation. Fahima denounced him as a "whore of the Shin Bet security service".

Fahima lives in the Arab village Ar'ara in northern Israel, and works as a Hebrew teacher. In June 2010, she converted to Islam at a mosque in Umm al-Fahm.
