= Gilboa Prison =

Prison in Israel

Coordinates: 32°32′51″N 35°25′03″E

Gilboa Prison (Hebrew: בית הסוהר גלבוע) is a high security prison in northern Israel, less than 6 km (4 mi) from the West Bank. It was built in 2004.

== History ==
Several female prison guards have alleged that they were sexually assaulted by Palestinian prisoners with the knowledge of their supervisors. The prison's former commander and intelligence officer were charged with failing to report and prevent sexual abuse of 4 female prison guards.

On 6 September 2021 it was the scene of the Gilboa Prison break, an escape by six Palestinian militants: Zakaria Zubeidi of the Al-Aqsa Brigades and Mahmoud Abdullah Ardah, Mohammed Qassem Ardah, Yaqoub Mahmoud Qadri, Ayham Nayef Kamamji and Monadel Yacoub Nafe’at from Islamic Jihad. By 19 September all of the six escapees had been recaptured by Israeli forces.
