= Orit Adato =

Israeli commander

- אורית אדטו
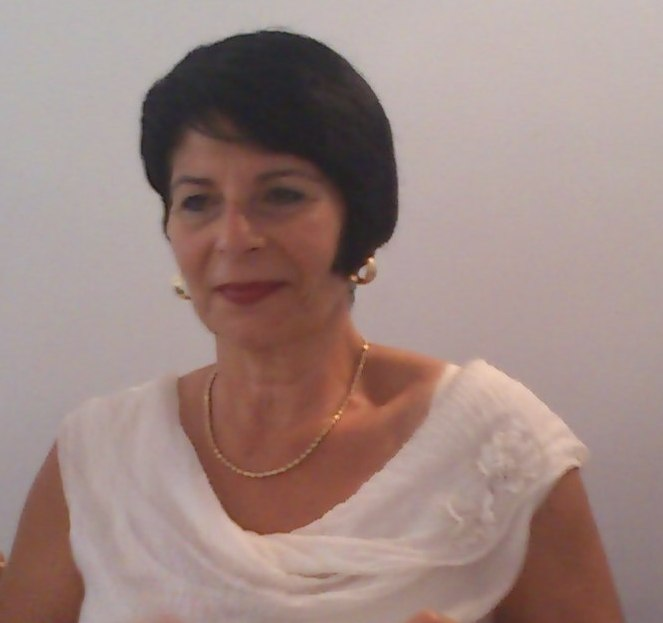
- Adato in 2014
- Born: Orit Eliaz; 1955 (age 70–71); Kiryat Tiv'on, Israel
- Spouse(s): Joseph Paz; Yehoshua Adato
- Military career
- Allegiance: Israel
- Branch: Army
- Service years: 1973–1997
- Rank: Brigadier General
- Unit: Women's Corps
- Commands: Women Teacher-Soldiers; Women's Corps, Nahal Brigade; Women's Corps
- Other work: Commissioner, Israel Prison Service (2000–2003)

Brigadier General (ret.) Orit Adato (Hebrew: אורית אדטו; born 1955, birth name: Orit Eliaz) is a former Israeli military commander and Israel Prison Service Commissioner. She was drafted into the Israel Defense Forces (IDF) in 1973. Following her mandatory service, she left the army and reenlisted in 1978. Her 24-year military career included both training and command positions. In her She served as commander of the Women's Corps from 1997 to 1999, until her retirement from the IDF. In 2000 she was appointed Commissioner of the Israel Prison Service, being the first woman to hold that post. She is the founder and managing director of Adato Consulting Ltd., and is an international consultant on prison management, prison security, prison privatization, and dealing with incarcerated terrorists and gang members.

== Early life and education ==
Orit Eliaz was born in Kiryat Tiv'on, Israel, the youngest of three children and only daughter of Moshe Eliaz and Rachel Pardo. She comes from the eighth generation of her family based in the country.

She was drafted into the Israel Defense Forces (IDF) in 1973. She spent nearly all her compulsory military service at the Army 12th Corps training base for women, where she became a squadron commander, training officer, and platoon leader. After her release, she married and moved to Haifa, but returned to a military career three years later. At the University of Haifa, she earned her bachelor's degree in educational administration in 1987 and master's degree in political science in 1993. She is a graduate of the IDF National Security College.

== Military career ==
Adato served in the IDF for 24 years at both the training and command levels. She became the Women's Corps officer of the Nahal Brigade in 1990, commanded the two central Women's Corps training bases from 1994 to 1995, and also commanded the Women Teacher-Soldiers unit.

In 1997 she was promoted to commander of the Women's Corps. At that time, the corps was being "radically reorganized" so that women's issues would be handled at the command and corps levels. Adato was instrumental in effecting changes in policies and attitudes toward women in the military, and actively worked to increase the entry of women to higher military ranks, including combat commands. In 1998, Adato was quoted as saying, "I see myself as heading an organization whose goal is its own demise". The Women's Corps was dissolved on August 1, 2001, and replaced by Chen (Hebrew: ח״ן), which eventually was subsumed into the General Security Service.

As part of her position, Adato reported on the prevalence of sexual harassment in the military. In 1997 she noted that complaints of sexual harassment were up 20 percent over the previous year. In 1999 she told the Knesset Committee on the Status of Women that while the actual number of complaints were down from 1997 to 1998, the number of incidents of physical or verbal sexual harassment that were reported to the military police rose 43 percent in 1998 over 1997, and 23 indictments were issued, compared to 16 the previous year.

In 1999 Adato served as a member of the Israeli delegation to the United Nations Committee on Women's Rights; she addressed the conference on "The role of women in the Israeli Defense Forces as a mechanism for improving the status of women".

== Prison Service Commissioner ==
Adato retired from the IDF with the rank of brigadier general. She was the first woman to achieve a three-star rank in the Israeli military. Her request to be assigned as an IDF military attache internationally was denied, but Shlomo Ben-Ami, Minister of Public Security, offered her the position of Commissioner of the Israel Prison Service, which she held from 2000 to 2003. She was the first Commissioner who had not previously served in the police force, and the first female Commissioner. She supervised a staff of 4,500 and managed a total inmate population of 12,000, as well as 2,000 prisoners in community service.

Adato's stewardship coincided with the Second Intifada, which brought 3,500 security prisoners into the prison system. During a hunger strike in May 2000, Adato participated in negotiations, together with the General Security Service, with the Palestinian Authority. In her policy-making, she focused on the humanitarian treatment of inmates. In line with Israel's policy to allow inmates to study for university degrees, Adato allowed security prisoners to receive the same benefit, although they could only study materials in Hebrew so their activities could be monitored. During Adato's tenure, the Ofek Prison was opened to accommodate juvenile inmates. However, no improvements were made in the conditions of confinement or in the overcrowding in the prison system, in part due to the influx of prisoners during the Second Intifada.

Adato brought more women into senior positions in the Prison Service. She installed female officers as commanders of seven of Israel's 21 prisons, and promoted one female officer to the rank of brigadier general, the first woman to attain that rank from within the service.

== Other activities ==
After leaving the Prison Service, Adato established her own consultancy firm, through which she has been recognized as an international consultant on prison management, prison security, prison privatization, and dealing with incarcerated terrorists and gang members. She frequently consults with African and Latin American nations on these issues. She also volunteers in organizations fostering Israel-U.S. relations, including Partnership 2000 and the Israel Forum, and writes and speaks on the topics of security prisoners and prisoner release. She advocates the release of security prisoners on a case-by-case basis, maintaining that "hard core" ideological prisoners cannot be rehabilitated.

== Memberships ==
Adato is the first international vice-president of the International Corrections and Prisons Association, and in 2011 was awarded an honorary life membership. She is also a board member of the Council for Peace and Security; a steering committee member of the Deborah Forum, which works for "the advancement of women in foreign policy and national security"; and a member of the America–Israel Friendship League.

== Personal life ==
Adato married Joseph Paz, a mathematics instructor, in 1976. They had one daughter, and divorced in 1980. In 1984 she remarried to Yehoshua Adato, a restaurant manager and electronic engineer. With her second husband, she has one son and one daughter.
