= Jalbun =

- Municipality type D (Village council)

Arabic transcription(s)
  - Arabic: جلبون
  - Latin: Jalabun (official)
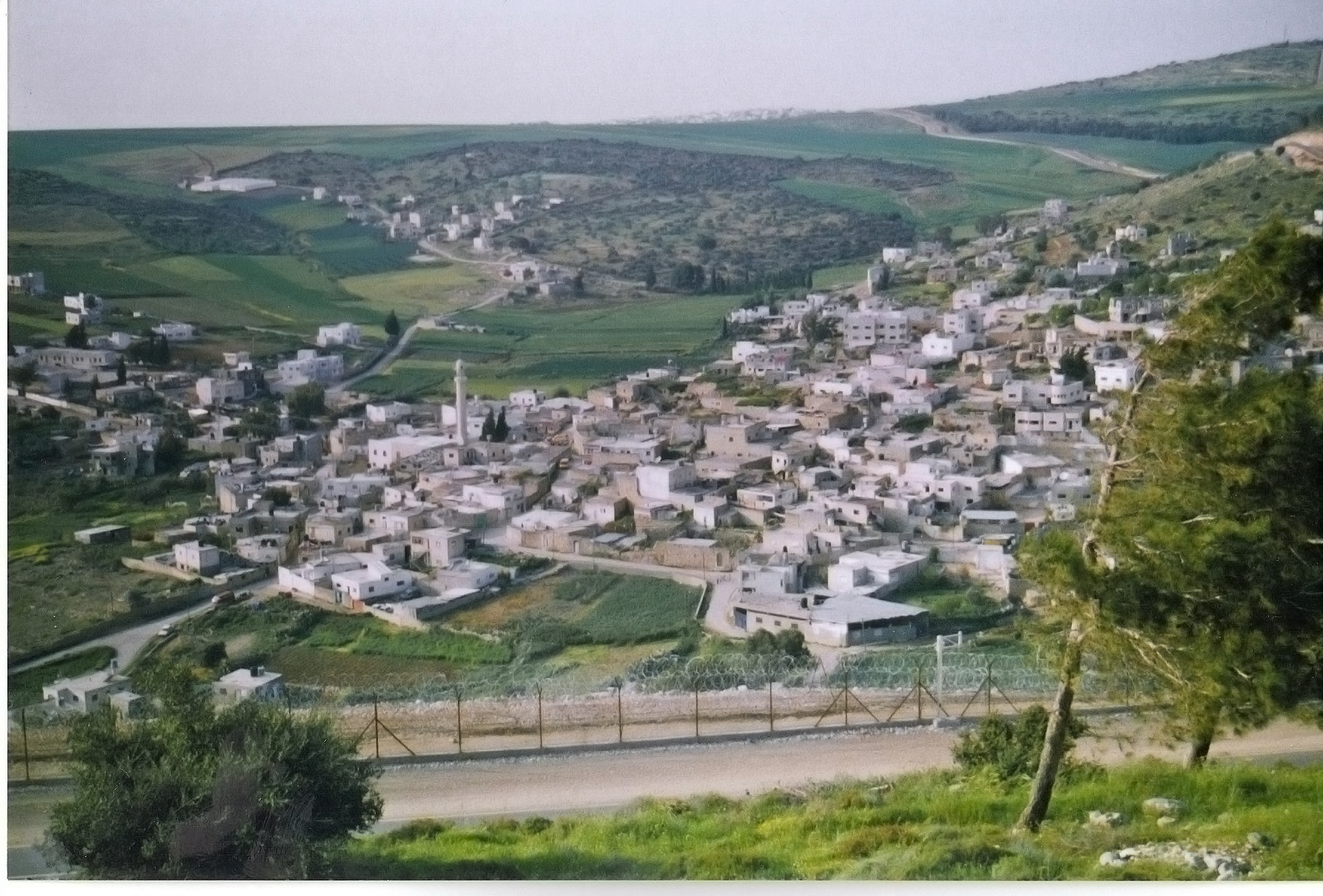

- Location of Jalbun within Palestine
- Coordinates: 32°27′36″N 35°24′56″E
- Palestine grid: 189/207
- State: State of Palestine
- Governorate: Jenin

Government
  - Type: Village council

Population (2017)
  - Total: 2,813
- Name meaning: from personal name

Jalbun (Arabic: جلبون) is a Palestinian village in the West Bank, located 13 km east of the city of Jenin in the northern West Bank. According to the Palestinian Central Bureau of Statistics, the town had a population of 2,493 inhabitants in mid-year 2006 and 2,813 in 2017. The primary healthcare facilities for Jalbun are described by the Ministry of Health as level 2.

== History ==
It has been suggested that Jalbun is identical to Gelbus, a place mentioned in Eusebius' Onomasticon. Ceramics from the Byzantine era have been found here.

=== Ottoman era ===
In 1517 Jalbun was incorporated into the Ottoman Empire with the rest of Palestine. During the 16th and 17th centuries, it belonged to the Turabay Emirate (1517-1683), which encompassed also the Jezreel Valley, Haifa, Jenin, Beit She'an Valley, northern Jabal Nablus, Bilad al-Ruha/Ramot Menashe, and the northern part of the Sharon plain.

In 1838 it was noted as an inhabited village, Jelbon, located in the District of Jenin, also called Haritheh esh-Shemaliyeh district.

In 1870 Victor Guérin found that Jalbun was divided into two quarters, with houses built of adobe. In the centre was an ancient mosque, situated east to west, which Guérin took to be a former church. There were ancient cisterns dug into rocks.

In 1870/1871 (1288 AH), an Ottoman census listed the village in the nahiya (sub-district) of Shafa al-Qibly.

In 1882 Jalbun was described as a “small village in a remote position on one of the spurs of the Gilboa range. It is surrounded with plough-land, and built of mud and stone, and supplied by cisterns”," in the PEF's Survey of Western Palestine.

=== British Mandate era ===
In the 1922 census of Palestine, conducted by the British Mandate authorities, Jalbun had a population of 410; 405 Muslims and 5 Christians, where the Christians were all Orthodox. The population increased in the 1931 census to 564, all Muslim, in a total of 119 houses.

In the 1944/5 statistics the population of Jalbun, (including Kh. el Mujaddaa) was 610, all Muslims, with 33,959 dunams of land, according to an official land and population survey. 243 dunams were used for plantations and irrigable land, 19,104 for cereals, while 25 dunams were built-up (urban) land.

=== Jordanian era ===
In the wake of the 1948 Arab–Israeli War, and after the 1949 Armistice Agreements, Jalbun came under Jordanian rule.

Israeli forces attacked Jalbun village, with small arms, on the 5 December 1949, they then expelled the inhabitants from their village causing fatal casualties amongst the villagers. The Jordanian government strongly protested against unwarranted Israeli action and called the UN Secretary-General to notify the United Nations Security Council to take prompt and strict measures to return expelled Palestinians to their village, to hand back their looted belongings, and to compensate the villagers for all losses and damages.

The Jordanian census of 1961 found 826 inhabitants.

=== post-1967 ===
Since the Six-Day War in 1967, Jalbun has been under Israeli occupation.

== Demography ==
=== Local origins ===
Jalbun's residents have their origins in settlers from Qabatiya, some of which originally came from Iraq. The majority of Jalbun's inhabitants belong to the Dar Abu Rub (Rbubiya) clan, which is one of four prominent clans in Qabatiya.

Among villages in the vicinity of Mount Gilboa and northern Samaria, the Dar Abu Rub clan is regarded as holy, with various folklore stories associated with them.

== Bibliography ==
- Barron, J.B., ed. (1923). Palestine: Report and General Abstracts of the Census of 1922. Government of Palestine.
- Conder, C.R.; Kitchener, H.H. (1882). The Survey of Western Palestine: Memoirs of the Topography, Orography, Hydrography, and Archaeology. Vol. 2. London: Committee of the Palestine Exploration Fund.
- Dauphin, C. (1998). La Palestine byzantine, Peuplement et Populations. BAR International Series 726 (in French). Vol. III : Catalogue. Oxford: Archeopress. ISBN 0-860549-05-4.
- Government of Jordan, Department of Statistics (1964). First Census of Population and Housing. Volume I: Final Tables; General Characteristics of the Population (PDF).
- Government of Palestine, Department of Statistics (1945). Village Statistics, April, 1945.
- Guérin, V. (1874). Description Géographique Historique et Archéologique de la Palestine (in French). Vol. 2: Samarie, pt. 1. Paris: L'Imprimerie Nationale.
- Hadawi, S. (1970). Village Statistics of 1945: A Classification of Land and Area ownership in Palestine. Palestine Liberation Organization Research Center.
- Mills, E., ed. (1932). Census of Palestine 1931. Population of Villages, Towns and Administrative Areas. Jerusalem: Government of Palestine.
- Palmer, E.H. (1881). The Survey of Western Palestine: Arabic and English Name Lists Collected During the Survey by Lieutenants Conder and Kitchener, R. E. Transliterated and Explained by E.H. Palmer. Committee of the Palestine Exploration Fund.
- Robinson, E.; Smith, E. (1841). Biblical Researches in Palestine, Mount Sinai and Arabia Petraea: A Journal of Travels in the year 1838. Vol. 3. Boston: Crocker & Brewster.
