= 2002 in Israel =

- Decades: 1980s; 1990s; 2000s; 2010s; 2020s
- See also: History of Israel; Timeline of Israeli history; List of years in Israel

Events in the year 2002 in Israel.

== Incumbents ==
- President of Israel – Moshe Katsav
- Prime Minister of Israel – Ariel Sharon
- President of the Supreme Court – Aharon Barak
- Chief of General Staff – Shaul Mofaz to July 9 Moshe Ya'alon
- Government of Israel – 29th Government of Israel

== Events ==
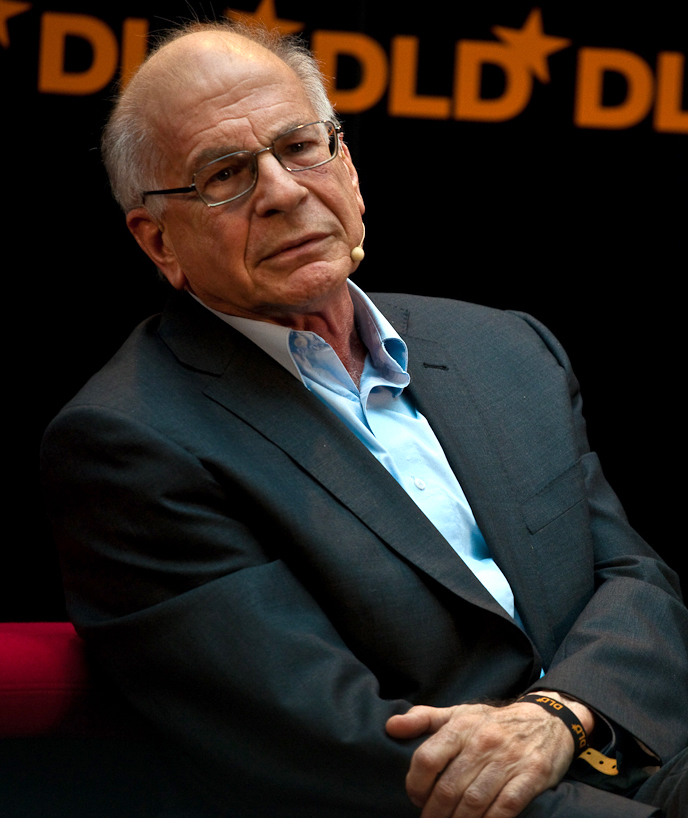
Daniel Kahneman is awarded the 2002 Nobel Memorial Prize in Economics

- January 28 – Channel 10 begins broadcasting.
- March 28 – 20,000 IDF reservists called up.
- 25 May – Sarit Hadad represents Israel at the Eurovision Song Contest with the song "Nadlik Beyakhad Ner" ("We'll Light a Candle Together").
- May 28 – The Israeli reconnaissance satellite Ofek-5 is launched.
- April 1 – 20,000 Israeli army reservists mobilized.
- July 9 – Moshe Ya'alon is appointed as the 17th Chief of Staff of the Israel Defense Forces.
- July 23 – The Tal Law is passed in the Knesset by a majority of 51 against 41. The law gives legal status to the continuation of the exemption from mandatory military service granted to Israeli Ultra Orthodox Jews studying at a yeshiva.
- August 28 – The government of Israel notified the United Nations Secretary General that it no longer intended to ratify the Rome Statute after signing it on December 31, 2000.
- October 9 – Daniel Kahneman receives the Nobel Memorial Prize in Economics for his work in Prospect theory, becoming the first Israeli Nobel laureate in economics.
- November 28 – 2002 Mombasa attacks: Three Israelis and 10 Kenyans are killed when a car bomb exploded in the lobby of the Israeli-owned beachfront Paradise Hotel, frequented almost exclusively by Israeli tourists near Mombasa in Kenya. 21 Israelis and 60 Kenyans are wounded in the attack. About 20 minutes earlier, an unsuccessful attempt is made to shoot down an Arkia Israel Airlines Boeing 757 chartered tourist plane taking off from nearby Moi International Airport using surface-to-air missiles; nobody is hurt on the plane, which lands safely in Tel Aviv. The main suspect for both attacks is al Qaeda.

=== Israeli–Palestinian conflict ===
(also see Second Intifada)

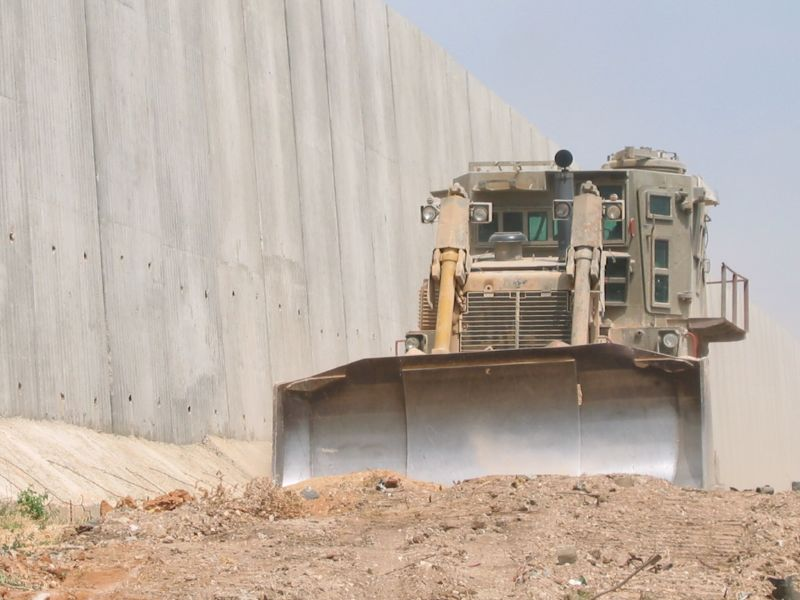
Israel begins construction of the West Bank Separation Barrier to protect Israeli civilians from Palestinian terrorism

The most prominent events related to the Israeli–Palestinian conflict which occurred during 2002 include:

- February 19 – Israel Defense Forces used explosives to destroy the five-storey main building and transmission tower of the Palestine Broadcasting Center in Ramallah claiming retaliation for the killing of six people by a Palestinian gunman linked to Fatah. The Israeli Government later singled out PBC for broadcasting material deemed to be anti-Semitic or that incited violence against Israeli citizens during the Second Intifada.
- April – The Israeli government approved the construction of a continuous security barrier which would separate the Palestinians in the West Bank and the Israeli population centers, thus prevent the infiltration of Palestinian Arab terrorists, particularly suicide bombers into Israeli population centers.
- August 14 – The Palestinian leader Marwan Barghouti is sentenced to five life sentences after being convicted by a civilian Israeli court on charges of murdering Israeli civilians and membership in a terrorist organisation.

==== Palestinian militant operations against Israeli targets ====
The most prominent Palestinian militant acts and operations committed against Israeli targets during 2002 include:

- January 9 – Two Hamas militants from Rafah attack an IDF outpost near the Kerem Shalom crossing on the Gaza-Egyptian border killing four IDF soldiers of a Bedouin unit before being killed themselves.
- January 18 – An al-Aqsa Martyrs' Brigade (AMB) gunman opens fire killing six Israelis before being killed himself at a Bat Mitzvah celebration in Hadera.
- January 22 – AMB gunman kills two in West Jerusalem before being shot dead by police.
- January 25 – 20 people are injured by a suicide bombing attack by Islamic Jihad (PIJ) near the Old Tel Aviv Central Bus Station.
- January 27 – A suicide bombing attack kills an elderly Israeli and injures 7 people in Jerusalem. The attack marks the first time a female suicide bomber is used. Fatah claims responsibility for the attack. Wafa Idriss had been working as a volunteer for the Palestinian Red Crescent.
- January 30 – Attempting Palestinian suicide bomber Murad Abu al-Asal injures two Shin Bet handlers in Tayibe.
- February 10 – Two Hamas gunmen kill two soldiers and wound four outside an IDF base in Beersheva before being shot dead.
- February 14 – The AMB and PFLP both claim responsibility for a roadside bomb in Gaza which destroys a Merkava tank and kills 3 soldiers.
- February 16 – Two Israeli teenagers are killed in a suicide bombing at a pizzeria in the Israeli settlement of Karnei Shomron in the northern West Bank. Another Israeli teenage girl is wounded in the attack and dies 11 days later. The PFLP claims responsibility.
- February 18 – One soldier killed in a suicide car bombing in Ma'ale Adumim.
- February 18 – An AMB suicide bombing attack kills three Jewish settlers in Kissufim crossing -.
- February 19 – AMB gunman kills six Israeli soldiers at an army outpost north of Jerusalem. The gunman escapes.
- February 22 – An attempting suicide bomber is shot dead by patrons at a supermarket in Efrat.
- February 27 – A female suicide bomber armed by AMB, injures three soldiers in Maccabim.
- March 2 – 11 people, including five children, are killed in an AMB suicide bombing near a yeshiva in the Haredi Beit Yisrael neighborhood in the center of Jerusalem.
- March 3 – An AMB sniper kills seven soldiers and three settlers at a checkpoint near Ofra. The gunman escapes.
- March 4 – An AMB gunman kills three Israelis in Tel Aviv before being shot dead.
- March 5 – An 85-year-old Israeli is killed when in a suicide bombing attack on an Egged bus No. 823 as it enters the Afula central bus station.
- March 5 – Three Israeli civilians, including a Druze policeman and 35 injured at a Seafood Market restaurant on Begin Road, Tel-Aviv, by Tanzim gunman Ibrahim Hasouna assisted by Mazen Mahmoud Omar Khadi and Marad Nazmi Aglon.
- March 7 – Five Jewish settlers are killed and 23 are wounded by a Hamas gunman in Atzmona before being shot dead. A PFLP suicide bomber injures five settlers in Ariel.
- March 9 – 11 Israelis killed and 54 injured in a Hamas suicide bombing attack on a cafe in Jerusalem. Two AMB gunmen kill two Israelis, plus one Israeli Arab, and wound 24, in Netanya before being shot dead.
- March 14 – The AMB and PFLP both claim responsibility for a roadside bomb in Gaza which destroys a Merkava tank and kills 3 soldiers.
- March 17 – A PIJ suicide bombing attack on Egged bus No. 22 in French Hill injures 9.
- March 20 – Seven Israelis, four soldiers and three civilians, killed in a PIJ suicide bombing attack on an Egged bus No. 823 traveling from Tel Aviv to Nazareth.
- March 21 – Three Israelis are killed and 86 others are injured in an AMB suicide bombing attack, King George Street shoppers in the center of Jerusalem. The bomber used metal spikes and nails.
- March 27 – 30 people killed and at least 140 civilians injured in a Hamas suicide bombing attack on the dining room of the Park Hotel in Netanya, during the festive dinner for Passover arranged by the hotel for 250 guests, and detonates an explosive device.
- March 28 – Hamas suicide bomber kills four Jewish settlers at Elon Moreh.
- March 29 – Two people and 29 injured killed by an 18-year-old Palestinian female suicide bomber attacks the entrance of the Shufersal supermarket in Kiryat HaYovel.
- March 29 – Gunman enters and kills two Jewish settlers in Netzarim settlement.
- March 30 – Allenby Street coffee shop bombing 32 people injured in an AMB suicide bombing attack on a Tel Aviv café. President George W. Bush and Secretary of State Colin Powell (USA) call on Yasir Arafat to condemn the wave of suicide bombings in Arabic, to his own people. Israeli spokespeople make similar demands. Arafat goes on television and swears in Arabic that he will "die a martyr, a martyr, a martyr". Members of AMB state that they will refuse any form of cease-fire, and that they will continue suicide bombings of civilians in Israel.
- March 31 – Matza restaurant suicide bombing: 15 killed (including two whole families) and injuring over 40 people when a Hamas bomber attacks an Arab-owned restaurant in Haifa.
- March 31 – An MDA paramedic and four Jewish settlers injured in a suicide bombing attack at the Efrat Medical Center of Efrat in Gush Etzion.
- April 1 – A 19-year-old Israeli police volunteer is killed by a Palestinian Arab suicide bombing attack in the city center of Jerusalem at a roadblock. Fatah and the Al-Aqsa Martyrs' Brigades claim responsibility for the attack.
- April 1 – Eleven Palestinian collaborators taken from Palestinian Authority prisons are killed.
- April 9 – Thirteen Israeli soldiers are killed in the Jenin refugee camp when a Palestinian militant detonates their occupying house.
- April 10 – Eight Israelis, four soldiers and four civilians, are killed and 22 injured in a Hamas suicide bombing on an Egged bus No. 960, en route from Haifa to Jerusalem, which exploded near Kibbutz Yagur, east of Haifa.
- April 12 – Mahane Yehuda Market bombing: A Palestinian Arab female suicide bomber attacks the entrance to Mahane Yehuda in Jerusalem, killing seven Israelis and injuring 104. The Al-Aqsa Martyrs' Brigades claims responsibility for the attack.
- April 27 – Two Hamas fighters in Israeli army uniform kill five Jewish settlers in Adora. One of the attackers escapes.
- May 7 – Sheffield Club bombing: A Palestinian Arab suicide bomber kills 15 and wounds 58 in a billiards hall that accommodated an illegal gambling club in Rishon LeZion. Hamas' military wing claims responsibility. The political wing does not confirm.
- May 8 – A Palestinian Arab suicide bomber severely injured in a premature attack near Megiddo, southeast of Haifa.
- May 19 – A Popular Front for the Liberation of Palestine (PFLP) suicide bomber, disguised as an Israeli soldier, kills two Israelis and injures more than 50 in Netanya.
- May 20 – Afula road bombing. One Israeli patrol-man injured.
- May 22 – Rothschild Street bombing: Two Israelis (one of them a teenager) are killed in an AMB suicide bombing in Rothschild Street in the center of Rishon LeZion.
- May 23 – A Palestinian detonates an IED on the underside of an oil tanker truck at Pi Glilot fuel storage facility station, injuring no one with authorities estimating that the chain reaction explosions would have killed at least 10,000 in the area.
- May 24 – Studio 49 Disco bombing. An AMB suicide car bomb injures three.
- May 27 – Petah Tikva Mall bombing: An Israeli woman and her 14 month old granddaughter, are killed and 37 injured when an AMB suicide bomber detonated himself near an ice cream parlor outside a shopping mall in Petah Tikva. The attacker was cousin of Nablus AMB commander assassinated May 22.
- May 28 – Itamar. Palestinian gunman kills three Jewish settlers before being shot dead.
- June 5 – 17 Israelis, fourteen soldiers and three civilians, are killed in a car bomb attack on an Egged bus No. 830 en route from Tel Aviv to Tiberias at the Megiddo junction near Afula of the gasoline tank side of the bus causing incineration. Most of the casualties are IDF soldiers who are on their way to their bases. PIJ claims responsibility for the attack.
- June 7 – In Karmei Tsur, Hebron, two PFLP gunmen kill three Jewish settlers. One attacker is shot dead, the other escapes.
- June 11 – A 14-year-old Israeli girl killed and 15 injured in a suicide bombing attack on the Jamil (Mifgash Ha'Sharon) restaurant in the Israeli coastal suburb of Herzliya.
- June 18 – Nineteen Israelis are killed, including one Arab, and over 74 injured when a Hamas Islamic law student suicide bomber attacks an Egged bus No. 32A in Jerusalem. The student used an explosive belt filled with metal balls for shrapnel.
- June 19 – Seven Israelis, including a five-year-old girl and her grandmother, are killed when a suicide bomber attacks a crowded bus stop and hitchhiking post at the French Hill intersection in northern Jerusalem.
- June 20 – In the Israeli settlement of Itamar, West Bank, Two Palestinian gunmen break into the Shabo family residence and kill a mother and her three sons, and injure two children also kill the Israeli rescue commander and injure eight Israeli commandos in the storming of the house.
- July 16 – Immanuel bus attack: Nine Israelis, including an infant child, are killed in an attack on Dan bus No. 189 traveling from Bnei Brak to Emmanuel in the northern West Bank. Two 20-kilo bombs are set off about 200 meters from the town's entrance, damaging the bus's front tires and forcing it off the road. The explosion damage the bus doors, trapping the passengers inside. The militants then started shooting at the bus, firing through the unprotected roof and throwing grenades through the narrow upper windows, which were not armored. AMB and PFLP claim responsibility.
- July 17 – Neve Shaanan Street bombing: Five people, two Israelis and two foreign workers, are killed and about 40 others are wounded in a double IJ suicide bombing on Neve Sha'anan Street near the Old Tel Aviv Central Bus Station.
- July 26 – Four Jewish settlers killed when AMB gunmen fire on two vehicles near Hebron.
- July 30 – Nevi'im Street bombing. Five wounded.
- July 31 – Hebrew University massacre: Nine Jewish students (four Israeli, four American, one dual French/American) and 85 injured by a Hamas bombing in the cafeteria of Hebrew University of Jerusalem. Palestinian Arabs rally in Gaza waving Hamas flags to celebrate the attack. On August 17, Israeli Security Forces expose a terrorist cell of Hamas operatives in East Jerusalem that had been responsible for the attack. The members had been planning another attack at the time of their arrest.
- August 4 – Meron Junction Bus 361 attack: Nine people, three Israeli soldiers, two Israeli civilians, two Israeli Arabs and two Philippine workers killed and forty mostly soldiers are injured in a Hamas suicide bombing on an Egged bus No. 361 traveling from Haifa to Safed at the Meron junction in northern Israel.
- August 5 – Umm al-Fahm junction bombing. Bomber killed, his accomplice injured. No other casualties.
- September 5 – Gaza Strip. Two Israeli soldiers killed by a bomb under their Merkava tank.
- September 18 – An Israeli policeman is killed and three others are wounded in a PIJ suicide bombing at a bus stop at the Umm al-Fahm junction.
- September 19 – Allenby Street bus bombing: A Hamas suicide bomber kills five Israelis and wounds more than 50 on a bus next to Tel Aviv's Great Synagogue.
- October 10 – A Hamas suicide bomber kills a 71-year-old Israeli woman and injures several other at a bus stop at Bar Ilan Junction.
- October 11 – U.S. embassy guards in Tel Aviv, thwart a Palestinian Arab suicide bomber from attacking a crowded beachfront cafe.
- October 21 – Karkur junction suicide bombing: A suicide attack carried out by two members of the PIJ in the Israeli urban area of Wadi Ara. 14 Israelis are killed in the attack and 40 are wounded.
- October 27 – Three Israeli soldiers are killed and 20 people injured in a Hamas suicide bombing at a gas station at the entrance to Ariel in the northern West Bank. The soldiers were restraining the bomber his vest was detonated by two settlers who shot him.
- November 4 – Kfar Saba shopping mall bombing: Two Israelis, a security guard and a civilian, are killed by a PIJ suicide bomber whom detonates himself at a Kfar Saba shopping mall.
- November 10 – AMB gunmen kills five Israelis in a kibbutz, north Israel. The gunman escapes.
- November 15 – Hebron ambush: Palestinian gunmen from PIJ ambush a detail of soldiers, border police and settler security officials close to the Ibrahim Mosque in Hebron. Three of the gunmen and 12 Israelis (4 soldiers, 5 border police, 3 settler guards) are killed, including Colonel Dror Weinberg, the Israeli army commander of Hebron.
- November 21 – Kiryat Menachem bus bombing: Eleven people killed and 50 injured by a Hamas-affiliated suicide bomber attacking Egged bus No. 20 in Jerusalem, .
- November 22 – Two PIJ suicide bombers injure four Israeli soldiers in a patrol boat, Gaza.
- November 27 – Gaza: PFLP suicide bomber. No Israelis injured.
- November 28 – Beit She'an attack: Six Israelis are killed when two AMB gunmen open fire and throw grenades at the Likud polling station in Bet She'an, where party members are casting their votes in the Likud primary.
- December 27 – Two PIJ gunmen enter Otniel settlement killing two Jewish settlers and two Israeli soldiers.

==== Israeli military operations against Palestinian militancy targets ====
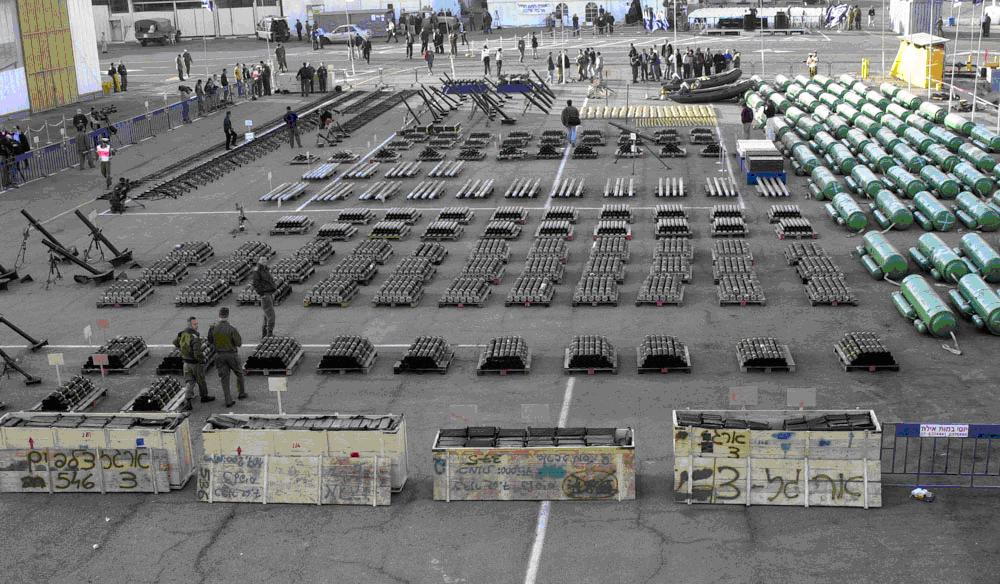
Military equipment confiscated from Karine A

The most prominent Israeli military counter-terrorism operations (military campaigns and military operations) carried out against Palestinian militants during 2002 include:

- January 2 – Karine A Affair: IDF Shayetet 13 naval commando captures the Palestinian Authority owned freighter "Karin A" in the Red Sea, which was on its way to the shores of the Gaza Strip. The vessel is found to be carrying 50 tons of weapons from Iran believed to be intended for Palestinian militants' use against Israelis. The weapons found on the ship include short-range Katyusha rockets, antitank missiles and high explosives.
- January 12 – The Israeli army assassinates al-Aqsa Martyrs' Brigade member Ra'id Karmi in Tulkarm.
- January 22 – The Israeli army kills West Bank leader of Izz ad-Din al-Qassam Brigade (IQB), Yusaf Suragji, with three other Hamas members in Nablus.
- January 22 – The Israeli army fire missiles at a car in Khan Yunis executing senior Hamas member Adil Hamdan (Bakr Hamdan). Another six Palestinians are killed in other incidents.
- February 1 – The Israeli army demolish the Palestine Broadcasting Center in Gaza City. Six Palestinians are killed in Brazil Refugee Camp.
- February 4 – The Israeli army fires missiles at a car near Rafah, killing five members of the PFLP including wanted man Ayman Bihdari.
- February 16 – In Jenin, the Israeli army use a remote-controlled bomb to execute Nazih al-Siba', a local Hamas leader.
- February 19 – The Israeli navy fire a missile into Yasser Arafat's compound in Gaza City killing 4 members of Force 17. Later in the day the army fire 18 shells into the compound killing 5 Preventive Security Force (PSF) officers.
- February 20 – An Israeli army incursion into Nablus kills nine Palestinians. A further seven Palestinians are killed in other incidents.
- February 28 – Operation Colorful Journey. The Israeli army attacks Balata refugee camp and Jenin. At least eleven Palestinians are killed, including Balata AMB leader Kayid Abu Mustafa and six PSF officers.
- March 4 – In an apparent attempt to execute Hamas politician, Hussein Abu Kuwayk, the Israeli army fires rockets at a truck in Ramallah killing his wife and 3 children as well as two bystanders.
- March 5 – Israeli helicopters fire a missile at a car in Ramallah killing three, including AMB members Muhannad Abu Halawa and Fawzi Murrar.
- March 6 – Thirteen Palestinians are killed in various incidents. Those killed included senior Hamas member 'Abd al-Nassar Ghazal.
- March 7 – Sixteen Palestinians are killed in various incidents, including two ambulance workers.
- March 8 – In Khuza'a, Khan Yunis, the Israeli army execute 16 Palestinians including PSF regional commander Major General Ahmad Mifraj. A further 24 Palestinians are killed in other incidents in the West Bank and Gaza Strip. The highest single-day death toll since the al-Aqsa intifada began.
- March 11 – An Israeli army raid into the Jabaliya refugee camp kills 18 Palestinians. A further six Palestinians are killed in Gaza.
- March 12 – Thirty Palestinians killed by 20,000 Israeli soldiers with 150 tanks attacking the Al-Amari refugee camp of Ramallah and al-Bireh.
- March 14 – Six Palestinians killed in Tulkarm including senior AMB member Mutasim Makhluf.
- Operation Defensive Shield (March 29 – May 3, 2002) – Large-scale counter-terrorist operation conducted by the IDF into Palestinian towns and villages in the West Bank aimed to halt Palestinian suicide bombings against civilians in Israel during the Second Intifada, which results in extensive damage to terrorist infrastructure and an important decrease of Palestinian attacks.
  - Battle of Jenin (April 1–11) – Israel attacked Palestinian militants in the city of Jenin.
  - Battle of Bethlehem (April 2 – May 10) – Israel occupied Bethlehem and tried to capture wanted Palestinian militants who were hiding in the Church of the Nativity.
  - Battle of Nablus (April 3–8) – Israel attacked Palestinian militants in the city of Nablus.
- April 3 – Israeli army execute six Palestinians in Jenin. One Israeli reservist killed.
- April 5 – IQB regional commander, Qays Udwan, and five other Hamas members, are killed by the Israeli army in Tubas. Twelve Palestinians are killed in Nablus when the Israeli army destroy large sections of the eastern market area.
- April 6 – At least fifty Palestinians and five Israeli soldiers are killed as Operation Defensive Shield continues.
- April 7 – In Nablus, at least 14 Palestinians are killed by the Israeli army.
- April 7 – Ansar III prison camp for Palestinian detainees is re-opened.
- April 8 – Thirty Palestinians killed by Israeli army in the Jenin refugee camp. Two Israeli soldiers are killed.
- April 10 – The Israeli army kill eleven Palestinian in Nablus old city.
- April 15 – Palestinian political figure Marwan Barghouti, who was accused by the Israeli authorities of the murder of Israeli civilians and attacks on Israeli soldiers, is captured by the Israel Defense Forces in Palestinian Authority administered city of Ramallah.
- April 22 – Israeli army in Hebron assassinate senior AMB member Marwan Zallum.
- April 24 – Senior AMB member Yacub Sarayra is assassinated in Bani Na'im. A second Palestinian is also killed.
- April 26 – Local Qalqilya PFLP leader, Ra'id Nazil is killed in an Israeli army raid.
- April 28 – Two Jewish settlers are arrested attempting to place a bomb at the Maqasid Hospital, Jerusalem.
- April 29 – The Israeli army launch a major pre-dawn incursion into Hebron. Ten Palestinians are killed, including wanted Hamas member, Tarik al-Dufashi.
- May 1 – Six Palestinians trapped in Yasser Arafat's compound in Ramallah, who were wanted by the Israelis, surrender themselves into British/US custody.
- May 3 – Israeli army raid Nablus house and kill senior Hamas member, Ali Hudairi, and four others. One Israeli soldier is killed.
- May 14 – Israeli army assassinates two Palestinian intelligence officers, Halhul.
- May 16 – In Beitunia, the Israeli army assassinates wanted PSF officer Ahmad Ghanem.
- May 22 – In the Balata refugee camp, Israeli army fire rockets, assassinating AMB Nablus commander Mahmud Titi. Two other AMB members and a bystander are also killed. IJ member, Khalid Zakami, is killed in an unexplained explosion, Jenin.
- June 12 – The Israeli army kill eight Palestinians in Gaza.
- June 17 – Israeli army assassinate local al Khadir AMB leader, Walid Sbeh.
- June 18 – Islamic Jihad (PIJ) Student leader, Yusif Bisharat, is assassinated by the Israeli army in Hebron.
- June 19 – Israeli army starts barring all Palestinians with West Bank ID cards from entering Jerusalem.
- June 22 – Operation Determined Path begins.
- June 24 – Israeli army assassinate two IQB leaders, Yasir Raziq and 'Amr Kufa. The two drivers of the cars destroyed in the missile attack, as well as a further two passengers, are also killed. Thirteen bystanders are injured.
- June 24 – US halt all direct dealing with Yasser Arafat for allegedly funding June 19, French Hill, suicide attack.
- June 30 – In Nablus, senior AMB member, Muhammad Tahir, is assassinated by the Israeli army with a member of Hamas is also killed.
- July 4 – Senior AMB members, Jihad al-Omarayn and Wa'il al-Nimral are killed by a bomb in their car. Presumed to be an Israeli assassination.
- July 9 – Near Jenin, PIJ member, Mu'ammar Daraghma, is fatally shot by Israeli soldiers while driving in a presumed assassination.
- July 22 – An Israeli warplane fires a one-ton bomb at an apartment in a densely populated neighborhood of Gaza City, killing Salah Shehade, top commander of Hamas's military wing (the Izz ad-Din al-Qassam Brigades), who headed Israel's most wanted list and whom Israel accuses of masterminding several terror attacks against Israeli soldiers and civilians in the Gaza Strip and in Israel proper during the Al-Aqsa Intifada. The apartment building is flattened and 14 civilians are killed, including Shehade's wife and nine children. The attack occurred hours after AMB, Tanzim, Hamas, and IJ had agreed to declare a unilateral cease-fire.
- July 28 – Curfew in Nablus lifted for the fifth time in forty days.
- August 2 – In Salim, Nablus, Israeli army execute Hamas member, Amjad Jabour, outside his home.
- August 5 – In Burqa, Nablus, Israeli forces assassinate AMB member, Khalid Sayf. A Palestinian bystander is also killed.
- August 6 – In Jenin, AMB members Ali Ajuri and Murad Marshud, assassinated by air to surface missile.
- August 7 – Israeli army commandos assassinate Tulkarm local AMB commander, Ziad Da'as. Two Palestinian bystanders also killed.
- August 7 – In Khan Yunis, an Israeli army sniper assassinates Hamas member Hussam Hamdan, son of top Hamas political leader Ahmad Nimr.
- August 12 – In Yamun, Jenin, Israeli soldiers take AMB member Ghazal Frayhat into custody before fatally shooting him.
- August 14 – In Tubas, Israeli army fire rockets into a house assassinating senior Hamas member Nasir Jarrar. The victim was reliant on a wheelchair having lost one arm and both legs in previous Israeli attempts to kill him.
- August 19 – Israeli army hands control of Bethlehem back to the PSF.
- August 20 – In Ramallah, Israeli commandos assassinate senior PFLP member Muhammad Saadat, brother of the head of the PFLP, Ahmad Saadat.
- August 20 – In Tulkarm, Israeli army assassinates Tanzim member, Afsam Salim.
- August 23 – In Jenin, Israeli army assassinate AMB Jenin commander Muhammad al-Ott, in a firefight.
- August 31 – In Tubas, Israeli army fire four missiles at a car in an attempt to assassinate local AMB leader, Jihad Sawafta and kills one AMB member, Rafat Daraghma and two teenagers in the car. One missile strikes a house killing two children.
- September 1 – In Hebron, Israeli army shoot dead four unarmed Palestinians.
- September 10 – Israeli army raid kills wanted Palestinian Mahmud Harfush.
- September 13 – In Gaza, unexplained explosion kills three Palestinians including wanted Fatah member Iyad Sharif.
- September 19 – Operation Matter of Time to isolate Yasser Arafat.
- September 24 – 90 Israeli tanks with bulldozers and helicopters move into Gaza City and Bayt Lahia. Nine Palestinians are killed, including local AMB leader Muhammad Kishku and senior IQB member Yasin Nassar.
- September 26 – Israeli army fire two missiles at two carts in an attempt to assassinate most wanted member of IQB, Muhammad Dayif. Two Hamas members killed and thirty bystanders injured.
- September 26 – In Tulkarm, Israeli army assassinate senior Hamas member Nashat Abu Jabara and demolish his home. One Israeli soldier killed.
- September 27 – Near Hebron. Israeli army assassinate wanted Palestinian Muhammad Yaghmur.
- September 29 – Israeli army end siege of Yasser Arafat's compound in Ramallah.
- October 6 – PIJ member Samir Nursi assassinated in Jenin refugee camp following exchange of fire with Israeli soldiers.
- October 7 – Israeli army sends 40 tanks with helicopters into Khan Yunis. Fourteen Palestinians killed.
- October 12 – AMB member Muhammad Ubayyat assassinated by exploding phone, in what is believed to have been an Israeli attempt to assassinate his brother, Bethlehem tanzim commander Nassir Ubayyat.
- October 14 – In Nablus, Two PIJ members, Wassim Saba'na and Muhammad Musa, assassinated.
- October 17 – Israeli army shells residential area of Rafah. Six Palestinians killed, including two women, two teenagers and a nine-year-old.
- October 25 – Hundreds of Israeli soldiers, backed by scores of tanks and other military vehicles, take control of the Palestinian Authority administered city of Jenin in response to a suicide bombing that killed 14 people.
- October 29 – In Tubas, Israeli army undercover unit assassinate senior Hamas member Asim Sawafta.
- October 30 – In Nablus, Israeli commandos assassinate PA intelligence officer, Ajid Mansur.
- October 31 – In Jenin, Operation Vanguard. Ends November 10.
- October 32 – Three Hamas members assassinated in an explosion. Hamas spokesman, Abdel Aziz al-Rantissi acknowledges that they were probably preparing a bomb.
- November 4 – In Nablus, Israeli army fire missile at a car assassinating wanted Hamas member Hamid Sidr. Another Hamas member, Firas Abu Ghazala is also assassinated.
- November 9 – In Jenin, Israeli army assassinates PIJ leader Iyad Sawalha in a raid on his house.
- November 15 – In Tulkarm, Israeli army undercover unit assassinate Hamas member Mahmud Obeid.
- November 17 – In Tulkarm, Israeli army undercover unit attempt to assassinate Riad 'Abd al Ghani, instead execute his brother.
- November 19 – In Tulkarm, Israeli army assassinates AMB member Tariq Zaghal. Three bystanders killed.
- November 22 – In the Jenin refugee camp, senior UNRWA official Iain Hook is shot dead by an Israeli army sniper while inside the UNRWA compound.
- November 26 – An Israeli rocket attack on a house in Jenin refugee camp kills AMB Jenin commander Ala' Ahmad Sabbagh and IQB Jenin commander Imad Nasharti.
- December 4 – Israeli army fire five missiles into a building in Gaza City killing Palestine Resistance Committee (PRC) member Mustafa Sabah who is reported to be the inventor of an anti-tank bomb used in earlier attacks.
- December 4 – In Hebron, the Israeli army shoot dead two PIJ members, Sami Shawer and Ahmad Srour.
- December 6 – Ten Palestinians including two UNRWA workers are killed when forty Israeli tanks enter Bureji refugee camp searching for PRC leader Ayman Shishniyya.
- December 7 – Near Jenin, Israeli army assassinate PIJ member 'Abd al-Hadi Omar.
- December 10 – In Khan Yunis, the Israeli army assassinates Hamas member Yasin al-Agha and in Balata refugee camp, the Israeli army assassinates wanted Palestinian Usama Badra.
- December 12 – Israeli army shell-fire kills five unarmed labourers in the Gaza Strip.
- December 13 – In the Nur al-Shams refugee camp, Israeli army assassinates Hamas's Tulkarm military commander, Tariq 'Abid Rabbuh.
- December 13 – In Bethlehem, Israeli army kill Hamas member Jadallah Shuka.
- December 16 – The Israeli army fatally shoots two armed Hamas members attempting to enter Israel from the Gaza Strip. Elsewhere in the Gaza Strip the Israeli army kill two civilians in separate incidents.
- December 23 – In Jenin, Israeli army assassinates two wanted Hamas members. Shaman Suduh and Mustafa Baqash.
- December 25 – In Nablus, Israeli army shoot senior Hamas member, Talib Abu Hawash denying him medical attention having him exsanguinate.
- December 26 – In Tulkarm, Israeli army assassinate local AMB head Jamal Yahya. In Ramallah, a car is ambushed assassinating Hamas member Bassam Ashqar. In Qabatiyya local PIJ leader, Yusif Abu Rub, is also assassinated. An Israeli undercover enter a hospital in Ramallah and kill wanted man, Samir al-Shamali, who was working as a guard. Six other Palestinians are killed by the Israeli army during the day.

== Notable deaths ==
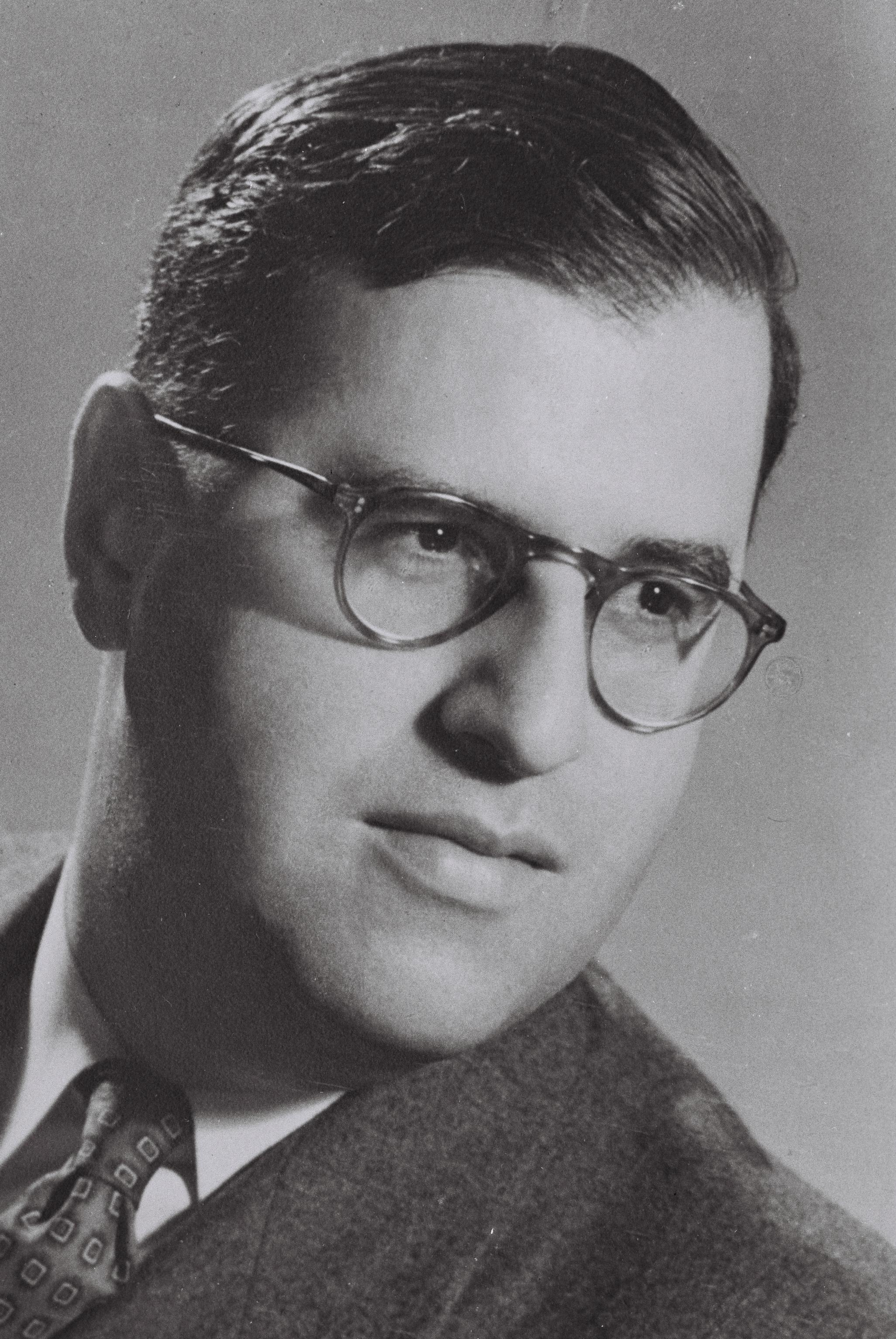
Abba Eban

- April 10 – Haim Cohn (born 1911), German-born Israeli jurist and politician.
- May 24 — Joseph Bau, Israeli artist, cartoonist, author and animator, known as a founder of Israel's animation industry.
- October 2 – Haim Yosef Zadok (born 1913), Austro-Hungarian (Galicia)-born Israeli jurist and politician.
- October 11 – Maxim Levy (born 1950), Moroccan-born Israeli politician.
- October 15 – Yaakov (Ze'ev) Farkash (born 1923), Hungarian-born Israeli cartoonist and illustrator.
- September 7 – Uziel Gal (born 1923), German-born Israeli gun designer best remembered as the designer and namesake of the Uzi submachine gun.
- November 11 – Yisrael Amir (born 1903), Russian (Lithuania)-born Israeli Haganah member, first commander of the Israeli Air Force.
- November 11 – Esther Raziel-Naor (born 1911), Russian (Belarus)-born Israeli jurist and politician.
- November 17 – Abba Eban (born 1915), South African-born Israeli foreign affair minister.
- Full date unknown – Yaakov Ben-Tor (born 1910), German-born Israeli geologist.

== See also ==
- 2002 in Israeli film
- Israel at the 2002 Winter Olympics
- 2002 in the Palestinian territories
