= List of Palestinian suicide attacks =

This article contains a non-comprehensive list of Palestinian suicide attacks carried out by Palestinian individuals and militant groups, usually against Israeli civilian targets. The use of indiscriminate attacks on civilian populations is illegal under international law.

The first suicide attack was carried out in 1989. The high point was in 2002 during the Second Intifada. The Al-Aqsa Intifada saw a dramatic upswing in suicide bombings, with approximately 40% of attacks originating in East Jerusalem. (Note: "During the second intifada, from October 2000 until October 2005, 30 suicide bombings and other attacks killed 195 people and injured many more in Jerusalem. Of these, 186 casualties resulted from attacks perpetrated by Jerusalem residents.") A 2007 study of Palestinian suicide bombings during the Second Intifada (September 2000 through August 2005) found that 39.9% of the suicide attacks were carried out by Hamas, 26.4% by Fatah, 25.7% by the Palestinian Islamic Jihad (PIJ), 5.4% by the Popular Front for the Liberation of Palestine (PFLP) and 2.7% by other organizations. The attacks steeply declined by 2008.

The Simon Wiesenthal Center has advocated classifying suicide bombings as crimes against humanity, a position adopted by Amnesty International and Human Rights Watch in 2002.

The criteria used for this list:

- successful deliberate attacks committed by Palestinian militant groups or individuals against either civilians or security forces, in which the perpetrators intended to die during the attack.
- The perpetrator(s) are not included in the death tolls noted in this list.

== 1980s ==
=== 1989 ===
Name	Date	Location	Dead	Injured	Notes	Ref.
Bus 405 suicide attack	July 6, 1989	Near Kiryat Yearim	16	17	Carried out by Palestinian Islamic Jihad.	

== 1990s ==
=== 1993 ===
Name	Date	Location	Dead	Injured	Notes	Ref
Mehola Junction bombing	April 16, 1993	Mehola junction	1	10	Hamas claimed responsibility. Carried out together with Palestinian Islamic Jihad.	
Beit El car bomb	October 4, 1993	Near Beit El	none	29	Hamas member Sulayman Zidan was responsible.	

=== 1994 ===
Name	Date	Location	Dead	Injured	Notes	Ref
Afula Bus suicide bombing	April 6, 1994	Afula	8	40	Hamas claimed responsibility. Carried out together with Palestinian Islamic Jihad.	
Hadera bus station suicide bombing	April 13, 1994	Hadera	5	30	Hamas claimed responsibility. Carried out together with Palestinian Islamic Jihad.	
Dizengoff Street bus bombing	October 19, 1994	Tel Aviv	22	50	Attributed to Hamas.	
Netzarim Junction bicycle bombing	November 11, 1994	Netzarim	3	11	Hamas claimed responsibility. Carried out together with Palestinian Islamic Jihad.	
Jerusalem bus bombing	December 25, 1994	Jerusalem	0	13	Attributed to Hamas.	

=== 1995 ===
Name	Date	Location	Dead	Injured	Notes	Ref
Beit Lid massacre	January 22, 1995	Beit Lid Junction	21	69	Two bombers. One detonated at rescue party. Palestinian Islamic Jihad claimed responsibility.	
Kfar Darom bus attack	April 9, 1995	Vicinity of Kfar Darom	8	52	Palestinian Islamic Jihad claimed responsibility.	
Ramat Gan bus 20 bombing	July 24, 1995	Ramat Gan	6	30	Hamas claimed responsibility.	
Ramat Eshkol bus bombing	August 21, 1995	Jerusalem	4	100+	Police Chief Noam Eisenman was killed. Hamas claimed responsibility.	

=== 1996 ===
Name	Date	Location	Dead	Injured	Notes	Ref
First Jerusalem bus 18 suicide bombing	February 25, 1996	Jerusalem Central Bus station	26	48	Hamas claimed responsibility.	
Ashkelon bus station bombing	February 25, 1996	Ashqelon	2	80+	Hamas claimed responsibility.	
Second Jerusalem bus 18 suicide bombing	March 3, 1996	Jaffa street, Jerusalem	19	7	Hamas claimed responsibility.	
Dizengoff Center suicide bombing	March 4, 1996	Tel Aviv	13	130	Attributed to Hamas. Carried out together with Palestinian Islamic Jihad.	

=== 1997 ===
Name	Date	Location	Dead	Injured	Notes	Ref
Café Apropo bombing	March 21, 1997	Tel Aviv	3	47	Hamas claimed responsibility.	
Netzarim bombing	April 1, 1997	Netzarim	0	0	Palestinian Islamic Jihad claimed responsibility.	
Kfar Darom bombing	April 1, 1997	Kfar Darom	0	5	Palestinian Islamic Jihad claimed responsibility.	
1st Mahane Yehuda Market attack	July 30, 1997	Jerusalem main market	16	170	Hamas claimed responsibility.	
Ben Yehuda Street Bombing	September 4, 1997	Jerusalem Ben Yehuda Street	5	192	Hamas claimed responsibility.	

=== 1998 ===
Name	Date	Location	Dead	Injured	Notes	Ref
Beitunya car bombing	March 30, 1998	Ramallah	2	0	Hamas claimed responsibility.	
Kfar Darom school bus bombing	October 29, 1998	Gaza Strip	1	3	Hamas claimed responsibility.	
Jerusalem bombing (1998)	November 6, 1998	Jerusalem	2	20	20 wounded. Two Islamic Jihad suicide bombers.	

=== 1999 ===
Name	Date	Location	Dead	Injured	Notes	Ref
Egged bus 960 bombing	September 5, 1999	Tveria	0	1	Hamas claimed responsibility.	
Haifa Central Bus Station bombing	September 5, 1999	Haifa	0	0	Hamas claimed responsibility.	

== 2000s ==
=== 2000 ===
Name	Date	Location	Dead	Injured	Notes	Ref
Gaza bombing	October 26, 2000	Gaza Strip	0	1	Youth suicide bomber on bike. Palestinian Islamic Jihad claimed responsibility.	
2000 Mahane Yehuda Market attack	November 2, 2000	Jerusalem	2	9	Booby-trapped car. Palestinian Islamic Jihad claimed responsibility.	
Mehola bombing	December 22, 2000	Mehola Junction	0	3	Hamas claimed responsibility.	

=== 2001 ===
Name	Date	Location	Dead	Injured	Notes	Ref.
Netanya centre bombing	January 1, 2001	Netanya	0	60	Hamas claimed responsibility.	
Netanya bombing attack	January 8, 2001	Netanya	0	24	Hamas claimed responsibility.	
Mei Ami junction bombing	March 1, 2001	Vadi Ara	1	9	Hamas claimed responsibility.	
Netanya bombing	March 4, 2001	Netanya	3	60	Hamas claimed responsibility.	
Egged bus 6 bombing	March 27, 2001	French Hill, Jerusalem	0	28	Hamas claimed responsibility.	
Mifgash Shalom attack	March 28, 2001	Kfar Saba	2	4	Hamas and Palestinian Islamic Jihad claimed responsibility.	
Kfar Saba bombing	April 22, 2001	Kfar Saba	1	50	Hamas and Palestinian Islamic Jihad claimed responsibility.	
Or Yehuda bombing	April 23, 2001	Near Ben Gurion Airport	0	8	Hamas claimed responsibility.	
Nablus school bus bombing	April 29, 2001	Nablus, West Bank	0	0	Hamas claimed responsibility.	
1st HaSharon Mall suicide bombing	May 18, 2001	Netanya	5	100	Hamas claimed responsibility.	
Hadera bus station suicide bombing	May 25, 2001	Central bus station, Hadera	0	65	2 Palestinians within a car bomb. Palestinian Islamic Jihad claimed responsibility.	
Gaza Strip suicide bombing	May 29, 2001	Gaza Strip	0	0	No group claimed responsibility.	
Dolphinarium discotheque suicide bombing	June 1, 2001	Tel Aviv	21	100+	Hamas claimed responsibility.	
Dugit bombing	June 22, 2001	Gaza Strip	2	0	Car explosion. Hamas claimed responsibility.	
Kissufim bombing	July 9, 2001	Southern Gaza Strip crossing point	0	0	Hamas claimed responsibility.	
Binyamina train station suicide bombing	July 16, 2001	Binyamina	2	11	Palestinian Islamic Jihad claimed responsibility.	
Moshav Beka'ot bombing	August 8, 2001	Northern Jordan Valley	0	1	Hamas claimed responsibility.	
Sbarro restaurant suicide bombing	August 9, 2001	Jerusalem	16	130	Hamas and Palestinian Islamic Jihad claimed responsibility.	
Wall Street Cafe bombing	August 12, 2001	Kiryat Motzkin	0	21	Palestinian Islamic Jihad claimed responsibility.	
Hanevi'im street bombing	September 4, 2001	Jerusalem	0	21	Hamas claimed responsibility.	
Jerusalem car bombings	September 4, 2001	Jerusalem	0	23	Series of car bombs.	
Nahariya train station suicide bombing	September 9, 2001	Nahariya Railway Station	3	94	Suicide bomber was an Arab Israeli citizen. Hamas claimed responsibility.	
Beit Lid junction bombing	September 9, 2001	Near Netanya	0	11	Hamas claimed responsibility.	
Kibbutz Shluhot bombing	October 7, 2001	Kibbutz Shluhot	1	0	Palestinian Islamic Jihad claimed responsibility.	
Kibbutz Be'eri Suicide Bombing	October 17, 2001	Kibbutz Be'eri	0	2	The Popular Front for the Liberation of Palestine claimed responsibility.	
Erez Crossing attack	November 26, 2001	Erez Crossing	0	2	Hamas claimed responsibility.	
1st Egged bus 823 bombing	November 29, 2001	Haifa	3	9	Carried out by Palestinian Islamic Jihad together with Al-Aqsa Martyrs' Brigades.	
Ben Yehuda Street Bombing	December 1, 2001	Downtown Jerusalem	11	188	Hamas claimed responsibility.	
Haifa bus 16 suicide bombing	December 2, 2001	Haifa	15	40	Hamas claimed responsibility.	
Hilton Mamilla bombing	December 5, 2001	Mamilla, Jerusalem	0	11	Carried out by Palestinian Islamic Jihad together with Hamas.	
Check Post Junction bus bombing	December 9, 2001	Haifa	0	30	A second unexploded device was found nearby.	
Neve Dekalim bombing	December 12, 2001	Neve Dekalim	0	4	Hamas claimed responsibility.	

=== 2002 ===
Name	Date	Location	Dead	Injured	Notes	Ref.
Tel Aviv outdoor mall bombing	January 25, 2002	Tel Aviv	0	25	Double Suicide attack, carried out by Palestinian Islamic Jihad together with Fatah.	
2002 Hadera attack	January 17, 2002	Hadera	6	33	Al-Aqsa Martyrs' Brigades claimed responsibility.	
Jaffa Street bombing	January 27, 2002	Jerusalem	1	100+	First female suicide bomber in the second intifada, Wafa Idris. Fatah claimed responsibility.	
Tayibe bombing	January 30, 2002	Tayibe	0	2	Fatah claimed responsibility.	
Karnei Shomron Mall suicide bombing	February 16, 2002	Karnei Shomron, West Bank	3	30	PFLP claimed responsibility.	
Hadera suicide bombing attack	February 17, 2002	Hadera	0	4	Al-Aqsa Martyrs' Brigades claimed responsibility.	
Maale Adumim - Jerusalem road bombing	February 18, 2002	Jerusalem	1	1	Soldier killed by an explosive that was detonated by the driver of the car he was checking. Al-Aqsa Martyrs' Brigades claimed responsibility.	
Kissufim bombing	February 18, 2002	Kissufim Crossing	3	3	Al-Aqsa Martyrs' Brigades is suspected in the incident.	
Mehola bombing	February 19, 2002	Mehola	0	0	Al-Aqsa Martyrs' Brigades claimed responsibility.	
Efrat supermarket bombing attack	February 22, 2002	Efrat, West Bank	0	1	Suicide bomber in supermarket.	
Maccabim bombing	February 27, 2002	Maccabim	0	2	No group claimed responsibility.	
Modi'in bombing	February 28, 2002	Modi'in Illit	0	0	No group claimed responsibility.	
Yeshivat Beit Yisrael massacre	March 2, 2002	Jerusalem	11	50+	Al-Aqsa Martyrs' Brigades claimed responsibility.	
2nd Egged bus 823 bombing	March 5, 2002	Afula	1	5	Palestinian Islamic Jihad claimed responsibility.	
Ariel hotel lobby bombing	March 7, 2002	Ariel, West Bank	0	15	PFLP claimed responsibility.	
Café Moment bombing	March 9, 2002	Rehavia, Jerusalem	11	54	Hamas claimed responsibility.	
Egged bus 22 bombing	March 17, 2002	Jerusalem	0	25	Palestinian Islamic Jihad claimed responsibility.	
3rd Egged bus 823 bombing	March 20, 2002	Vadi Ara	7	~30	Palestinian Islamic Jihad claimed responsibility.	
King George Street bombing	March 21, 2002	Jerusalem	3	42+	Al-Aqsa Martyrs' Brigades claimed responsibility.	
Jenin bombing	March 22, 2002	Jenin	0	1	Al-Aqsa Martyrs' Brigades claimed responsibility.	
Jerusalem bombing	March 26, 2002	Jerusalem	0	0	Al-Aqsa Martyrs' Brigades claimed responsibility.	
Passover massacre	March 27, 2002	Netanya	30	140	Suicide attack on Passover seder in Park Hotel. Carried out by Hamas and Palestinian Islamic Jihad.	
Kiryat HaYovel supermarket bombing	March 29, 2002	Kiryat Yovel	2	28	Hamas claimed responsibility.	
Allenby Street coffee shop bombing	March 30, 2002	Tel Aviv	1	~30	Al-Aqsa Martyrs' Brigades claimed responsibility.	
Matza restaurant suicide bombing	March 31, 2002	Haifa	16	31	Hamas claimed responsibility.	
Efrat Medical Center	March 31, 2002	Efrat, West Bank	0	4	Hamas claimed responsibility.	
Jerusalem Roadblock bombing	April 1, 2002	Jerusalem	1	0	Al-Aqsa Martyrs' Brigades claimed responsibility.	
Yagur Junction bombing	April 10, 2002	Yagur	8	19	Hamas claimed responsibility.	
2002 Mahane Yehuda Market bombing	April 12, 2002	Jerusalem	6	112	Al-Aqsa Martyrs' Brigades claimed responsibility.	
Gush Katif bombing	April 19, 2002	Gush Katif	0	2	Palestinian Islamic Jihad claimed responsibility.	
Sheffield Club bombing	May 7, 2002	Rishon LeZion	16	55	Hamas claimed responsibility.	
Netanya Market bombing	May 19, 2002	Netanya	3	59	Carried out by Hamas together with PFLP	
Afula road bombing	May 20, 2002	Afula	0	0	Hamas claimed responsibility.	
Rothschild Street bombing	May 22, 2002	Rishon Lezion	3	40	Al-Aqsa Martyrs' Brigades claimed responsibility.	
Pi Glilot bombing	May 23, 2002	North of Tel Aviv	0	0	A bomb exploded underneath a fuel truck. The truck burst into flames, but the blaze was quickly contained.	
Studio 49 Disco bombing	May 24, 2002	Tel Aviv	0	2	The security guard opened fire on a Palestinian attempting to detonate a car bomb. The Palestinian was killed, but the bomb exploded prematurely, injuring bystanders. Al-Aqsa Martyrs' Brigades claimed responsibility.	
Petah Tikva Mall bombing	May 27, 2002	Petah Tikva	2	37	Al-Aqsa Martyrs' Brigades claimed responsibility.	
Megiddo Junction bus bombing	June 5, 2002	Megiddo Junction	17	38	Palestinian Islamic Jihad claimed responsibility.	
Herzliya shawarma restaurant bombing	June 11, 2002	Herzliya	1	15	No group claimed responsibility.	
Kafr Salem bombing	June 17, 2002	Kafr Salem	0	0	No group claimed responsibility.	
Patt Junction Bus Bombing	June 18, 2002	Jerusalem	19	74+	Hamas claimed responsibility.	
French Hill Junction massacre	June 19, 2002	French Hill, Jerusalem	6	35	Al-Aqsa Martyrs' Brigades claimed responsibility.	
Immanuel bus attack	July 16, 2002	Emmanuel-Bnei Brak bus 189	9	20	Detonation of an explosive device and shooting. Hamas claimed responsibility.	
Neve Shaanan Street bombing	July 17, 2002	Southern Tel Aviv	5	40	Islamic Jihad claimed responsibility.	
Nevi'im Street bombing	July 30, 2002	Jerusalem	0	5	Al-Aqsa Martyrs' Brigades claimed responsibility.	
Hebrew University massacre	July 31, 2002	Hebrew University, Jerusalem	9	80	Included American and French casualties. Bomber was from East Jerusalem. Hamas claimed responsibility.	
Meron Junction Bus 361 attack	August 4, 2002	Meron Junction	9	38	Arab bomber with Israeli citizenship. Hamas claimed responsibility.	
1st Umm al-Fahm bombing	August 5, 2002	Umm al-Fahm Junction in Wadi Ara	0	1	The Palestinian exploded in a taxi killing himself and wounding an Israeli-Arab driver from Nazareth.	
2nd Umm al-Fahm bombing	September 18, 2002	Umm al-Fahm Junction in Wadi Ara	1	3	Palestinian Islamic Jihad claimed responsibility.	
Allenby Street bus bombing	September 19, 2002	Tel Aviv	6	~70	Hamas claimed responsibility.	
Geha road bombing	October 10, 2002	Bar-Ilan interchange, Geha road	1	12	Hamas claimed responsibility.	
Karkur junction suicide bombing	October 21, 2002	Karkur Junction	14	40+	2 Suicide bombers used a booby-trapped jeep with 100 kg TNT. Palestinian Islamic Jihad claimed responsibility.	
Sonol gas station bombing	October 27, 2002	Ariel, West Bank	3	~18	Victims killed while trying to prevent the Palestinian from detonating the bomb. Hamas claimed responsibility.	
Kfar Saba shopping mall bombing	November 4, 2002	Kfar Saba	2	~70	Palestinian Islamic Jihad claimed responsibility.	
Kiryat Menachem bus bombing	November 21, 2002	Kiryat Menachem, Jerusalem	11	50+	Hamas claimed responsibility.	
Erez Crossing bombing	November 22, 2022	Erez Crossing	2	0	Palestinian Islamic Jihad claimed responsibility.	

=== 2003 ===
Name	Date	Location	Dead	Injured	Notes	Ref.
Tel-Aviv central bus station massacre	January 5, 2003	Southern Tel Aviv	23	~120	Carried out by two members of the Fatah Al-Aqsa Martyrs' Brigades, with the help of Palestinian Islamic Jihad.	
Haifa bus 37 suicide bombing	March 5, 2003	Carmeliya neighborhood, Haifa	17	53	Hamas claimed responsibility	
London Cafe bombing	March 30, 2003	Netanya	0	26	Palestinian Islamic Jihad claimed responsibility.	
Kfar Saba train station bombing	April 24, 2003	Kfar Saba	1	24	PFLP claimed responsibility jointly with Al-Aqsa Martyrs' Brigades.	
Mike's Place suicide bombing	April 30, 2003	Mike's Place pub, Tel Aviv	3	50+	Carried out by Hamas using a British Muslim citizen of Pakistani descent and together with al-Aqsa Martyrs' Brigades.	
Gross square attack	May 17, 2003	Gross square, Hebron, West Bank	2	0	Hamas claimed responsibility.	
Jerusalem bus 6 bombing	May 18, 2003	Jerusalem	7	20	Hamas claimed responsibility.	
3rd Kfar Darom bombing	May 19, 2003	Gaza Strip	0	3	A Palestinian suicide bomber riding a bicycle blew up himself next to a military jeep. Hamas claimed responsibility.	
Afula mall bombing	May 19, 2003	Afula shopping center	3	70	Palestinian Islamic Jihad and Fatah claimed responsibility	
Davidka Square bus bombing	June 11, 2003	Downtown Jerusalem	17	100+	Hamas claimed responsibility.	
Sdei Trumot bombing	June 19, 2003	Moshav Sdei Trumot	1	0	Palestinian Islamic Jihad claimed responsibility.	
Kfar Yavetz bombing	July 7, 2003	Kfar Yavetz	1	3	Palestinian Islamic Jihad claimed responsibility.	
Ariel bus station bombing	August 12, 2003	Ariel, West Bank	1	2	Victims were soldiers waiting at a bus station.	
Rosh HaAyin bombing	August 12, 2003	Rosh HaAyin	1	0	Palestinian suicide bomber at a supermarket	
Shmuel HaNavi bus bombing	August 19, 2003	Shmuel Hanavi, Jerusalem	23	130+	Hamas claimed responsibility.	
Tzrifin bus stop attack	September 9, 2003	Tzrifin	9	30	Hamas claimed responsibility.	
Café Hillel bombing	September 9, 2003	Jerusalem	7	50+	Hamas claimed responsibility.	
Maxim restaurant suicide bombing	October 4, 2003	Haifa	21	60	Palestinian Islamic Jihad claimed responsibility.	
Tulkarem bombing	October 9, 2003	Tulkarem, West Bank	0	3	Fatah claimed responsibility.	
Azzoun bombing	November 3, 2003	Azzoun, West Bank	0	0	Responsibility remains unclaimed.	
Geha Interchange bus stop bombing	December 25, 2003	Geha Junction	4	20+	PFLP claimed responsibility.	

=== 2004 ===
Name	Date	Location	Dead	Injured	Notes	Ref
3rd Erez Crossing attack	January 14, 2004	Gaza Strip	4	10	Al-Aqsa Martyrs' Brigade and Hamas claimed joint responsibility.	
2004 Jerusalem bus 19 bombing	January 29, 2004	Rehavia, Jerusalem	11	50+	Al-Aqsa Martyrs' Brigade and Hamas claimed responsibility.	
Liberty Bell Park bus bombing	February 22, 2004	Liberty Bell Garden, Jerusalem	8	60	Al-Aqsa Martyrs' Brigade claimed responsibility.	
4th Erez Crossing attack	March 6, 2004	Gaza Strip	2	20	Hamas, Palestinian Islamic Jihad and the military wing of Fatah claimed responsibility.	
Ashdod Port massacre	March 14, 2004	Port of Ashdod	10	16	Double suicide bombing. Carried out by Al-Aqsa Martyrs' Brigade together with Hamas.	
5th Erez Crossing attack	April 17, 2004	Gaza Strip	1	3	No group claimed responsibility.	
Beka'ot checkpoint bombing	May 22, 2004	Beka'ot checkpoint, Jordan Valley, West Bank	0	1	PFLP claimed responsibility.	
Beersheba bus bombings	August 31, 2004	Downtown Beersheba on buses 7 and 12	16	100+	Hamas claimed responsibility.	
Sinai bombings	October 7, 2004	Sinai peninsula, Egypt	34	171	Suicide bombing at two Sinai holiday resorts frequented by Israeli tourists: thirty-one died at the Taba Hilton and three at Ras a-Satan. Among the dead were 12 Israelis; over 120 were wounded. The attack was masterminded by Iyad Saleh and carried out by a Palestinian group.	
Carmel Market bombing	November 1, 2004	Tel Aviv	3	30	PFLP claimed responsibility.	

=== 2005 ===
Name	Date	Location	Dead	Injured	Notes	Ref
Karni border crossing attack	January 13, 2005	Karni crossing, Gaza Strip	6	5	Carried out together by Hamas with Fatah Al-Aqsa Martyrs' Brigades and Popular Resistance Committees.	
Stage Club bombing	February 25, 2005	Tel Aviv sea promenade	5	50+	Carried out together with Al-Aqsa Martyrs' Brigades and with Hizballah involvement.	
2nd HaSharon Mall suicide bombing	July 12, 2005	Netanya	5	90+	Palestinian Islamic Jihad claimed responsibility.	
Hadera Market bombing	October 26, 2005	Hadera	7	55	Palestinian Islamic Jihad claimed responsibility.	
3rd HaSharon Mall suicide bombing	December 5, 2005	Netanya	5	40+	Palestinian Islamic Jihad claimed responsibility.	

=== 2006 ===
Name	Date	Location	Dead	Injured	Notes	Ref
1st Rosh Ha'ir restaurant bombing	January 19, 2006	Near Tel Aviv old central bus station	0	32	Palestinian Islamic Jihad claimed responsibility.	
Kedumim bombing	March 30, 2006	Kdumim, West Bank	4	0	Al-Aqsa Martyrs' Brigades claimed responsibility.	
2nd Rosh Ha'ir restaurant bombing	April 17, 2006	Near Tel Aviv old central bus station	11	68	Carried out by Palestinian Islamic Jihad together with Al-Aqsa Martyrs' Brigades.	

=== 2007 ===
Name	Date	Location	Dead	Injured	Notes	Ref
Eilat bakery bombing	January 29, 2007	Eilat	3	2	Palestinian Islamic Jihad and Al-Aqsa Martyrs' Brigades claim joint responsibility.	

=== 2008 ===
Name	Date	Location	Dead	Injured	Notes	Ref
Dimona bombing	February 4, 2008	Dimona	1	9	The Damascus leadership of Hamas claimed responsibility, but it has been argued they knew nothing of it, and that the operation was undertaken at the initiative of Hamas leaders in Gaza.	
Kerem Shalom suicide bombing	April 19, 2008	Kerem Shalom border crossing, Gaza Strip	0	13	Three Palestinian suicide bombers broke through the border fence to attack the Kerem Shalom IDF post, blowing themselves up and wounding several Israeli soldiers. Hamas claimed responsibility.	

== 2010s ==
=== 2015 ===
Name	Date	Location	Dead	Injured	Notes	Ref
Ma'ale Adumim attempted bombing	October 11, 2015	Jerusalem	0	1	Palestinian female bomber detonates a bomb in her car after being stopped by traffic cops, on the road from the Israeli settlement of Ma'ale Adumim to Jerusalem.	

=== 2016 ===
Name	Date	Location	Dead	Injured	Notes	Ref
2016 Jerusalem bus bombing	April 18, 2016	Jerusalem	0	20	A member of Hamas was involved, but Hamas, while praising the act, did not claim responsibility.	

== 2020s ==
=== 2024 ===
Name	Date	Location	Dead	Injured	Notes	Ref
Lehi Street bombing	August 18, 2024	Tel Aviv	0	1	Hamas and Islamic Jihad claimed responsibility. Israel confirmed it was a terrorist attack involving a powerful explosive.	

== See also ==
- Timeline of the Israeli–Palestinian conflict
- Israeli West Bank barrier
- Israeli casualties of war
- Palestinian political violence
- First Intifada (1987–1993)
- Second Intifada (2000–2005)
- Silent Intifada (2014)
- Israeli–Palestinian conflict (2015)
- Sumud (steadfastness)

== Sources and external links ==
- Israeli Ministry of Foreign Affairs
- Johnston's Terrorism Archive
- Jewish Virtual Library Fatal terrorist attacks in Israel since the Declaration of Principles
- Palestinian Suicide Bombers: A Statistical Analysis
- Willing to Die: Palestinian suicide bombers, TruTV

== Sources ==
- ICG (December 20, 2012). Extreme Makeover? (II): The Withering of Arab Jerusalem (PDF). International Crisis Group. Archived from the original (PDF) on May 12, 2019.
