= Palestinian war crimes =

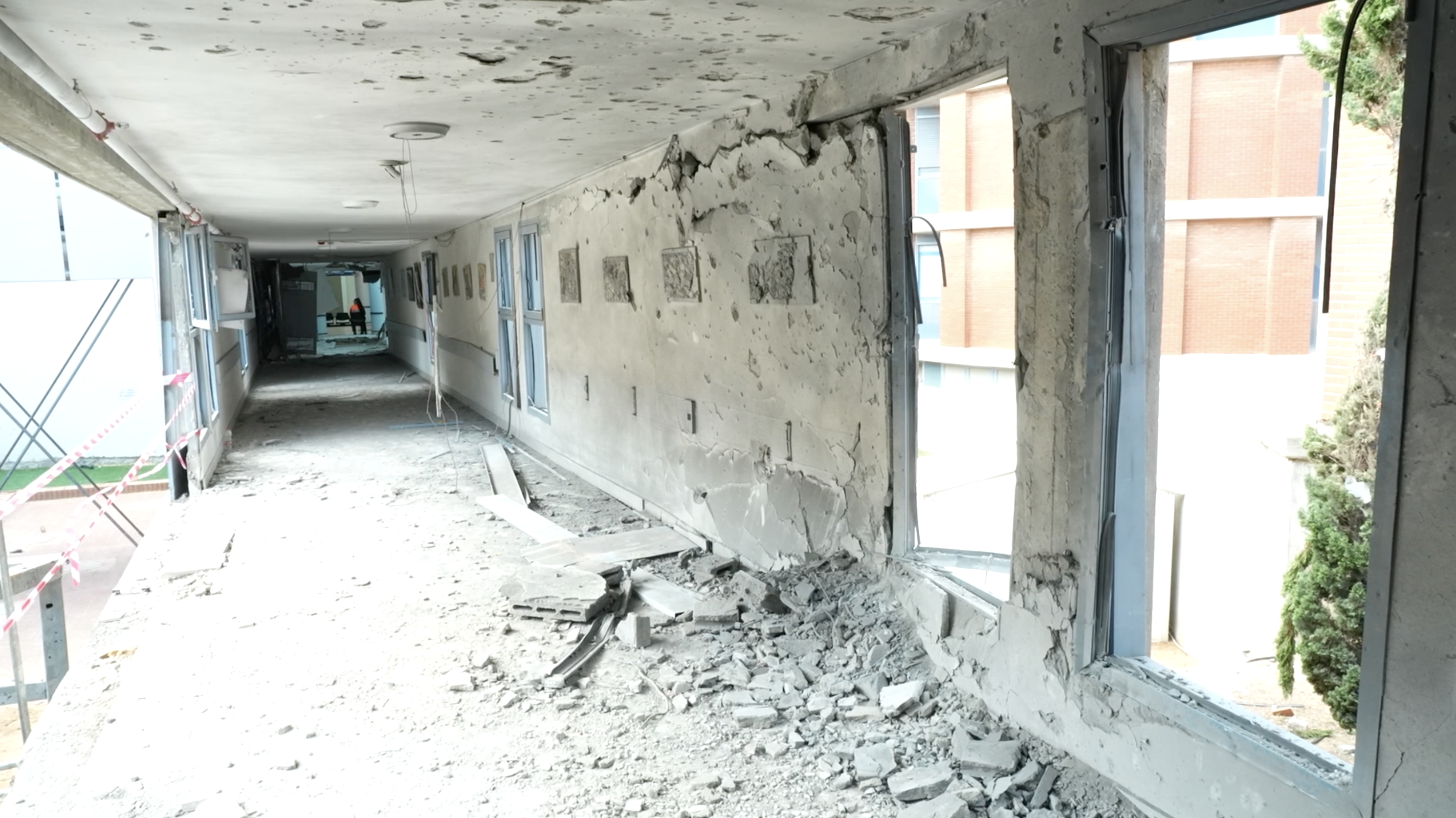
The aftermath of Hamas rocket attacks in the Barzilai Medical Center in Ashkelon, October 2023.

Palestinian war crimes are the violations of international criminal law, including war crimes and crimes against humanity, which Palestinian militants, primarily the Islamist Nationalist organization Hamas and its paramilitary wing, the al-Qassam Brigades, have committed or been accused of committing. These have included murder, intentional targeting of civilians, killing prisoners of war and surrendered combatants, indiscriminate attacks, the use of human shields, rape, torture, and pillaging.

== Applicability of laws of war ==
Determining the applicability of laws of war to militant groups is a difficult question, as both the Council of Europe and International Committee of the Red Cross note that international law traditionally treats war and terrorism as separate legal categories. The Israeli, American, EU, UK, Japanese, and Canadian governments define Hamas as a terrorist group. However, many countries have disagreed with this characterization and have engaged with Hamas as a legitimate political entity. While the term "international law" conventionally pertains to states, it has also been applied to insurgent and terrorist armed forces. Accordingly, even insurgencies deemed lawful under international law that meet the criteria of "just cause" must also adhere to principles of "just means" as well. Regarding Hamas and its combatants, even if they have a presumptive right to fight against what they term as an "illegal occupation," they must still abide by legal rules of "discrimination", "proportionality", and "military necessity" under international law as conventional states do.

According to Human Rights Watch, "international humanitarian law, through the well-established doctrine of command responsibility" also applies "to political and other leaders insofar as they have 'effective responsibility and control' over the actors in question...thus making its leadership also criminally liable."

== War crimes ==
=== Targeting of civilians ===
According to Amnesty International, the "prohibition on targeting civilians is absolute in international law".

Human Rights Watch has declared that the "scale and systematic nature" of Hamas' targeting of Israeli civilians "meet the definition of a crime against humanity", and that its particular use of suicide bombings taking "place in the context of violence that amounts to armed conflict...are also war crimes."

=== Suicide attacks ===
According to Amnesty International, "the campaign of suicide bombings and deliberate attacks against Israeli civilians by Hamas and other armed groups constitutes crimes against humanity.

Between September 1993 and the outbreak of the Second Intifada in September 2000, "Palestinian groups carried out fourteen suicide bombing attacks against Israeli civilians, mostly in 1996-97, killing more than 120 and wounding over 550. Hamas said it committed most of the attacks."

In the decade between 2000 and 2010, there were 146 suicide attacks committed by Palestinian militant groups against Israelis, resulting in 516 fatalities. A 2007 Harvard University study of 135 Palestinian suicide attacks conducted between September 2000 and August 2005 determined Hamas responsible for 39.9% of such attacks during that period.

=== Use of human shields ===
Israel has accused Hamas of using human shields in the Gaza Strip, saying that Hamas has purposely attempted to shield itself from Israeli attacks by storing weapons in civilian infrastructure, launching rockets from residential areas, and telling residents to ignore Israeli warnings to flee. Israel has also accused Hamas of maintaining command and control bunkers and tunnel infrastructure below hospitals. Hamas has denied using hospitals to shield any command centre, while it has previously made remarks expressing support for Palestinians refusing to flee areas Israel has targeted.

The Israeli accusations have been supported by NATO, and during the Gaza war European Union nations condemned Hamas for allegedly using hospitals as human shields, while the Secretary-General of the United Nations said "Hamas and other militants use civilians as human shields". In 2023, HRW stated "Hamas and other Palestinian armed groups need to take all feasible precautions to protect civilians under their control from the effects of attacks and not use civilians as 'human shields.'"

=== Indiscriminate attacks ===
Between 2000 and 2021, over 17,000 rockets were fired into Israel from Gaza. Hamas' use of indiscriminate rocket attacks on civilians has been widely condemned as a war crime. Palestinian UN Observer Ibrahim Kraishi has equally decried the attacks, stating that "every rocket and mortar fired from Gaza toward Israel is a “crime against humanity.”

== Second Intifada ==
During the Second Intifada, the majority of Israeli casualties were civilian non-combatants, with Hamas conducting numerous attacks deliberately targeting civilians.

Prominent examples include:

Name	Date	Dead	Injured	Notes
HaSharon Mall suicide bombing	May 18, 2001	5	100	
Dolphinarium discotheque suicide bombing	June 1, 2001	21	100+	
Sbarro restaurant suicide bombing	August 9, 2001	16	130	Carried out with Palestinian Islamic Jihad
Nahariya train station suicide bombing	September 9, 2001	3	94	
Ben Yehuda Street Bombing	December 1, 2001	11	188	
Haifa bus 16 suicide bombing	December 2, 2001	15	40	
Café Moment bombing	March 9, 2002	11	54	
Passover massacre	March 27, 2002	29	140	Carried out with Palestinian Islamic Jihad
Kiryat HaYovel supermarket bombing	March 29, 2002	2	28	
Matza restaurant suicide bombing	March 31, 2002	16	31	
Yagur Junction bombing	April 10, 2002	8	19	
Sheffield Club bombing	May 7, 2002	16	55	
Netanya Market bombing	May 19, 2002	3	59	Carried out with PFLP
Patt Junction Bus Bombing	June 18, 2002	19	74+	
Immanuel bus attack	July 16, 2002	9	20	
Hebrew University massacre	July 31, 2002	9	80	
Meron Junction Bus 361 attack	August 4, 2002	9	38	
Allenby Street bus bombing	September 19, 2002	6	70+	
Kiryat Menachem bus bombing	November 21, 2002	11	50+	
Haifa bus 37 suicide bombing	March 5, 2003	17	53	
Mike's Place suicide bombing	April 30, 2003	3	50+	Carried out with al-Aqsa Martyrs' Brigades
Jerusalem bus 6 bombing	May 18, 2003	7	20	
Davidka Square bus bombing	June 11, 2003	17	100+	
Tzrifin bus stop attack	September 9, 2003	9	30	
Café Hillel bombing	September 9, 2003	7	50+	
2004 Jerusalem bus 19 bombing	January 29, 2004	11	50+	carried out with Al-Aqsa Martyrs' Brigade
Ashdod Port massacre	March 14, 2004	10	16	Carried out with Al-Aqsa Martyrs' Brigade
Beersheba bus bombings	August 31, 2004	16	100+	
Karni border crossing attack	January 13, 2005	6	5	Carried out with Al-Aqsa Martyrs' Brigades and Popular Resistance Committees

== 2014 Gaza War ==
=== Killing and injuring of Gazan civilians ===
According to the Jerusalem Post, during the 2014 Gaza War, 20 civilians from Shuja'iyya were killed while protesting against Hamas. A few days later, Hamas reportedly killed two Palestinians in Gaza and wounded ten after a scuffle broke out over food handouts.

The IDF stated on 31 July that more than 280 Hamas rockets malfunctioned and fell inside the Gaza strip, hitting sites including Al-Shifa Hospital and the Al-Shati refugee camp, killing at least 11 and wounding dozens. Out of the Hamas denied that any of its rockets hit the Gaza Strip., but Palestinian sources said numerous rocket launches ended up falling in Gaza communities and that scores of people have been killed or injured. Israeli Military sources said the failed Hamas launches increased amid heavy Israeli air and artillery strikes throughout the Gaza Strip. They said the failed launches reflected poorly assembled rockets as well as the rush to load and fire projectiles before they were spotted by Israeli aircraft. While the Al-Shifa Hospital incident is disputed, early news reports have suggested that the strike was from an Israeli drone missile. UK based human rights group, Amnesty International concluded that the explosion at the Shati refugee camp on 28 July in which 13 civilians were killed was caused by a Palestinian rocket, despite Palestinian claims it was an Israeli missile.

=== Killing of suspected collaborators ===
Shurat HaDin filed a suit with the ICC charging Khaled Mashal with war crimes for the executions of 38 civilians. Hamas co-founder Ayman Taha was found dead; Al-Quds Al-Arabi reported he had been shot by Hamas for maintaining contact with the intelligence services of several Arab countries; Hamas stated he was targeted by an Israeli airstrike.

On 26 May 2015, Amnesty International released a report saying that Hamas carried out extrajudicial killings, abductions and arrests of Palestinians and used the Al-Shifa Hospital to detain, interrogate and torture suspects. It details the executions of at least 23 Palestinians accused of collaborating with Israel and torture of dozens of others, many victims of torture were members of the rival Palestinian movement, Fatah.

== Gaza war ==
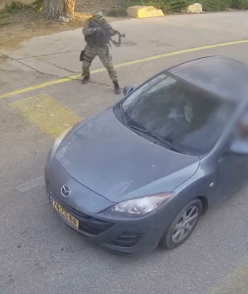
Hamas gunman shooting at a civilian vehicle in Israel

On 9 October 2023 Human Rights Watch stated that Hamas's apparent targeting of civilians, indiscriminate attacks, and taking of hostages amounted to war crimes. On 10 October 2023 the OHCHR stated the taking of hostages and use of human shields were war crimes. United Nations Human Rights chief Volker Türk noted that militant groups' "horrifying mass killings" were violations of international law.

=== Attacks during 7 October 2023 ===
==== Nova music festival massacre ====
As one of the first massacres of many in the coordinated attacks on 7 October 2023, militants of the al-Qassam Brigades and other Palestinian factions entered the Nova music festival in Re'im at c. 7 a.m. local time. As part of the attack, 378 people (344 civilians and 34 security personnel) were killed and many more wounded. Hamas also took 44 people hostage, and men and women were reportedly subject to sexual and gender-based violence. Some 20 of the attackers were also killed by Israeli security forces in the area of the festival.

==== Be'eri massacre ====
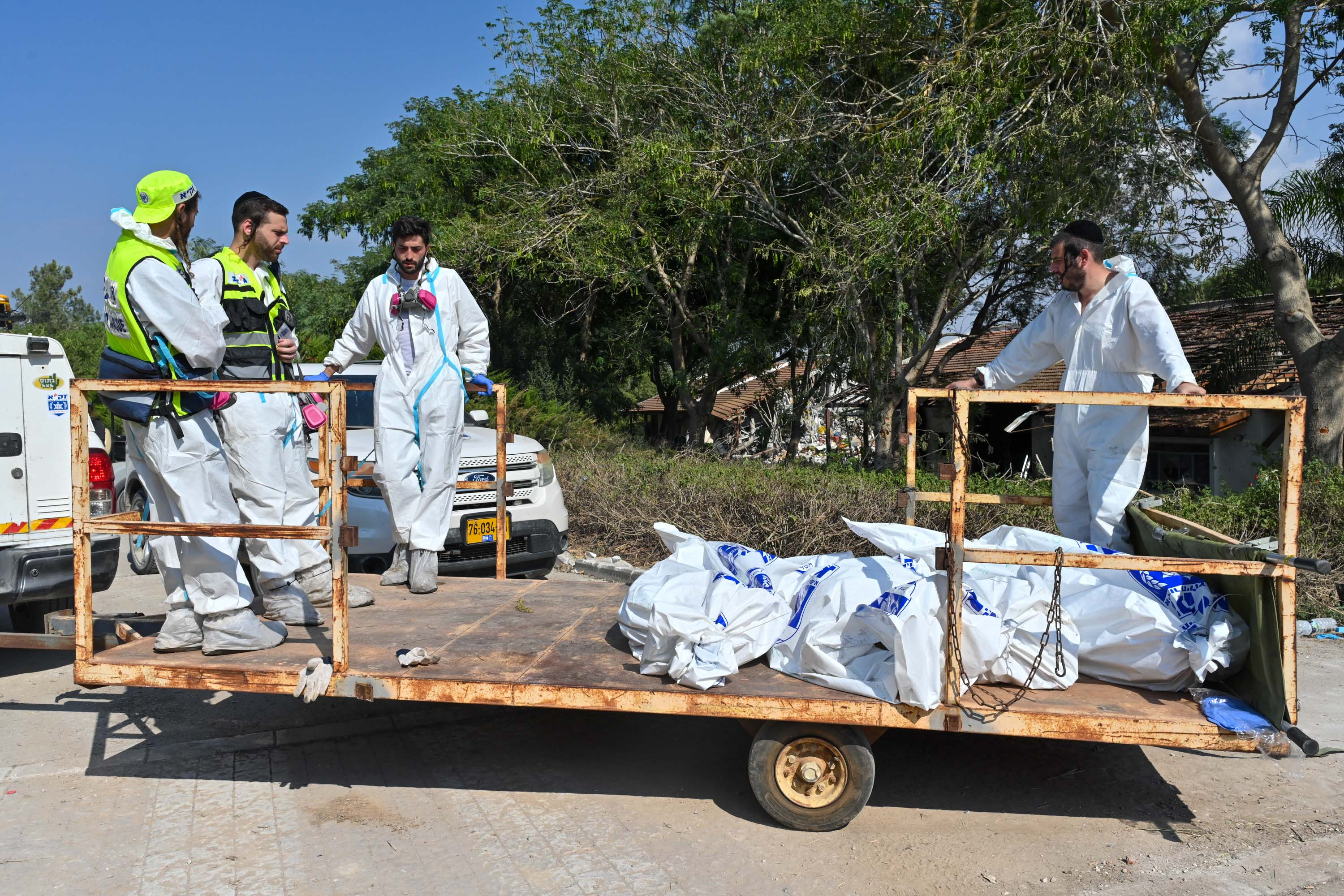
Zaka volunteers assisting in the removal of bodies

At c. 7:10 a.m., on 7 October 2023, around 70 al-Qassam and DFLP militants had entered and attacked the kibbutz of Be'eri, taking over 130 peoples' lives, including women (such as peace activist Vivian Silver), children, toddlers, and one infant, in total claiming the lives of 10% of the farming community's residents. Dozens of homes were also burned down.

=== Hostage taking ===
Human Rights Watch has stated that "Hamas and Islamic Jihad are committing war crimes by holding scores of Israelis and others as hostages in Gaza". During the Hamas attack approximately 200 people were taken hostage by militants. Hostages taken during the 7 October attacks by Hamas militants included women, children, elderly and infants.

==== Murder of hostages ====
On August 31, 2024, the IDF recovered the bodies of six hostages, including Hersh Goldberg-Polin, from a tunnel in Rafah. Autopsies revealed that they had been killed from close range just 1–2 days earlier. Subsequently, it was reported that Hamas militants holding Israeli hostages in Gaza were given new orders to execute them if Israeli forces approached. Following the recovery and burial of the hostages, Hamas released a propaganda video showing one of the slain captives before her death, seemingly intended to inflict psychological distress on the families of the hostages. Additionally, Hamas issued a warning that it would execute any remaining hostages if Israel attempted a rescue operation.

=== Sexual violence ===
During the October 7 attacks, Israeli women, girls and men were reportedly subjected to sexual violence, including rape and sexual assault, by Hamas or other Gazan militants. The militants involved in the attack are accused of having committed acts of gender-based violence, war crimes and crimes against humanity. Hamas has denied that its fighters engaged in sexual violence.

The extent of sexual violence perpetrated by militants, and whether it was planned and weaponised by the attackers, has been the subject of intense debate and controversy. Initially said to be "dozens" by Israeli authorities, they later clarified they could not provide a number. In January 2024, it was reported that several victims of sexual violence from 7 October and captivity in Gaza had come forward. A number of initial testimonies of sexual violence were later discredited, while Israel has accused international human rights groups of downplaying assault reports. As of January 2025, the former head of the security cases division in Israel's Southern District prosecutor's office said that no case was being filed due to a lack of evidence and complainants, which she said could be due to victims being dead or unwilling to come forward.

The UN's Special Representative on Sexual Violence in Conflict, Pramila Patten, reported in March 2024, with the "full cooperation" of the Israeli government, that there was "clear and convincing information" that Israeli hostages in Gaza had experienced sexual violence, and that there was "reasonable grounds to believe that conflict-related sexual violence occurred during the 7 October attacks". The report was not a full investigation, but designed to "collect and verify allegations", and the team stated that their conclusions fell below the legal threshold of being "beyond a reasonable doubt". In June 2024, the UN Commission of Inquiry (CoI) published a legally mandated report that stated there was "a pattern indicative of sexual violence by Palestinian forces during the attack", but that it was unable to independently verify allegations of rape due to Israel's obstruction of its investigation. It also found some of the allegations to be false and found "no credible evidence" that Palestinian militants had received direct orders to commit sexual violence.

On 12 April 2024, the European Union sanctioned military and special forces wings of Hamas and the armed wing of Palestinian Islamic Jihad due to their responsibility for the alleged sexual violence on 7 October. The EU said the two groups' fighters "committed widespread sexual and gender-based violence in a systematic manner, using it as a weapon of war." On 23 April 2024, the annual UN Secretary-General's report called on the Israeli government to allow access to "relevant UN bodies to carry out a fully-fledged investigation into all alleged violations". In July 2025, Hamas was added to the UN's sexual violence blacklist.

== See also ==
- Children in the Israeli–Palestinian conflict
- Human rights in Palestine
- Capital punishment in the Gaza Strip
- Criticism of Hamas
- Israeli war crimes

== Works cited ==
- Gettleman, Jeffrey; Schwartz, Anat; Sella, Adam; Shaar-Yashuv, Avishag (December 28, 2023). "'Screams Without Words': How Hamas Weaponized Sexual Violence on Oct. 7". The New York Times. ISSN 0362-4331. Archived from the original on March 6, 2024.
- Gettleman, Jeffrey; Sella, Adam; Schwartz, Anat (4 December 2023). "What We Know About Sexual Violence During the Oct. 7 Attacks on Israel". The New York Times. Archived from the original on 4 December 2023.
- Rubin, Shira (25 November 2023). "Israel investigates an elusive, horrific enemy: Rape as a weapon of war". The Washington Post. Archived from the original on 28 November 2023.
- Philp, Catherine; Weiniger, Gabrielle (7 June 2024). "Israel says Hamas weaponised rape. Does the evidence add up?". The Times.
- Sokol, Sam (23 January 2024). "'Right now someone is being raped in a tunnel': Knesset hears of Hamas sex crimes". The Times of Israel. Archived from the original on 14 February 2024.
- Kottasová, Ivana (6 December 2023). "What we know about rape and sexual violence inflicted by Hamas during its terror attack on Israel". CNN International. Archived from the original on 30 January 2024. "Since then, dozens of hostages have been released from Gaza as part of a truce between Israel and Hamas and some have also mentioned sexual abuse during their testimonies."
- Kingsley, Patrick; Bergman, Ronen; Boxerman, Aaron; Kershner, Isabel (26 March 2024). "Israeli Hostage Says She Was Sexually Assaulted and Tortured in Gaza". The New York Times. Archived from the original on 26 March 2024.
