= List of Israeli films of 2002 =

A list of films produced by the Israeli film industry in 2002.

== 2002 releases ==
Premiere		Title	Director	Cast	Genre	Notes	Ref
F E B	13	Abba Shahor Lavan (Hebrew: אבא שחור לבן, lit. "Black & White Dad")	Eitan Londner	Dan Toren	Drama, Family, Sport		
M A Y	16	Kedma (Hebrew: קדמה)	Amos Gitai	Andrei Kashkar and Helena Yaralova	Historical tragedy	Entered into the 2002 Cannes Film Festival	
A U G	1	Yossi & Jagger (Hebrew: יוסי וג'אגר)	Eytan Fox	Ohad Knoller, Yehuda Levi, Assi Cohen and Aya Koren	Romantic drama		
S E P	21	Beitar Provence (Hebrew: בית"ר פרובנס)	Ori Inbar	Ze'ev Revach, Itay Turgeman	Drama, Sport		
O C T	3	Wisdom of the Pretzel (Hebrew: חוכמת הבייגלה)	Ilan Heitner	Guy Loel, Osnat Hakim, Yoram Zacs, Beni Avni, Shai Werker, and Orit Sher	Comedy		
O C T	24	Broken Wings (Hebrew: כנפיים שבורות)	Nir Bergman	Orly Silbersatz Banai, Maya Maron and Nitai Gaviratz	Drama		
N O V	21	Open Heart (Hebrew: השיבה מהודו)	Menahem Golan	Aki Avni, Assi Dayan and Riki Gal	Drama, Romance	Israeli-American co-production	

== See also ==
- 2002 in Israel
