= Binyamina train station suicide bombing =

2001 Palestinian attack in Binyamina, Israel

- Part of the Second Intifada militancy campaign
- The attack aftermath

- The attack site
- Native name: הפיגוע בתחנת הרכבת בבנימינה
- Location: 32°30′50″N 34°56′59″E; Binyamina, Israel
- Date: 16 July 2001 c. 7:35 pm (UTC+2)
- Attack type: Suicide bombing
- Weapon: 20 kilograms (44 lb) suicide vest
- Deaths: 2 IDF soldiers (+1 bomber)
- Injuries: 11 civilians
- Perpetrator: The Palestinian Islamic Jihad claimed responsibility.

The Binyamina train station suicide bombing occurred on 16 July 2001 by a Palestinian suicide bomber near the Binyamina railway station in the town of Binyamina-Giv'at Ada, Israel. Two people were killed and 11 were injured.

The Palestinian Islamic Jihad group claimed responsibility for the attack.

== The attack ==
The suicide bomber was 20-year-old Nidal Shaduf, from a village near Jenin. After infiltrating Israel, he entered Binyamina. It has been theorized that he intended to blow himself up inside the crowded railway station, but found he could not enter due to a heavy police presence and stringent security measures. As a result, he detonated at a soldiers' bus stop near the train station, waiting until it began filling with people before detonating.

The suicide bomber detonated at 7:35 pm. Two Israel Defense Forces (IDF) soldiers were killed, and eleven people were injured, two of them seriously.

== Aftermath ==
Israeli security forces immediately froze all train traffic between Tel Aviv and Haifa. Israeli Police set up a dragnet to capture the vehicle which had been seen dropping the bomber off, using patrol cars, special forces, and helicopters, but without success. Several Palestinians staying illegally in Israel were caught in the area and taken into custody.

The IDF responded by attacking, primarily with tank fire, Palestinian Authority security installations and Force 17 positions. Israeli helicopters also struck a house in Bethlehem belonging to Fatah militants, killing four.

Both the United States and Palestinian Authority condemned the attack.
