= Meron Junction Bus 361 attack =

Hamas suicide bombing in 2002

- Part of the Second Intifada militancy campaign
- The attack site
- Native name: הפיגוע בקו 361 בצומת מירון
- Location: 32°59′18″N 35°26′37″E; Meron Junction, Israel
- Date: August 4, 2002; 24 years ago c. 8:45 am (UTC+2)
- Attack type: Suicide bombing
- Weapon: Suicide vest
- Deaths: 6 Israeli civilians and 3 soldiers (+1 bomber)
- Injuries: 38
- Perpetrator: Hamas claimed responsibility
- No. of participants: 1

On August 4, 2002, a Palestinian suicide bomber from the militant group Hamas exploded a suicide bombing aboard an Egged bus at the Meron junction in northern Israel near Safed. In addition to the bomber, six Israeli civilians, and three Israeli soldiers were killed. Thirty-eight people were injured.

Hamas subsequently publicly claimed responsibility for the attack, claiming it was in retaliation for an Israeli airstrike against a Hamas commander and to express displeasure with a UN-sponsored investigation into the Israeli incursion into the Jenin refugee camp that April.

== The attack ==
On August 4, 2002 nine people were killed and 50 wounded in a suicide bombing on Bus No. 361 which was on its way from Haifa to Safed. Just before 9:00 am in the morning the suicide bomber exploded the bomb when the bus reached the Meron junction, near the entrance to the burial site of Rabbi Shimon Bar Yohai, in northern Israel. It is a frequent pilgrimage site for Jewish worshippers.

The force of the blast blew off the roof and the bus burst into flames, killing or wounding most of the people in the bus. Among those killed were three soldiers, four Israeli civilians and two Philippine women.

== Victims ==
The nine people killed were:

- Mordechai Yehuda Friedman, 24, of Ramat Beit Shemesh
- Sari Goldstein, 21, of Karmiel
- Maysoun Amin Hassan, 19, of Sajur
- Marlene Miriam Menahem, 22, of Moshav Safsufa
- Sgt.-Maj. Roni Ghanem, 28, of Maghar
- Sgt. Yifat Gavrieli, 19, of Mitzpe Adi
- Sgt. Omri Goldin, 20, of Mitzpe Aviv
- Adelina Kononen, 37, of the Philippines
- Rebecca Roga, 40, of the Philippines

== Reactions ==
Hamas claimed responsibility for the attack. Overnight on Sunday, IDF troops captured Hamas commander Mazan Fukha, responsible for dispatching the suicide bomber, in the West Bank town of Tubas together with two of his deputies.

Saeb Erakat condemned the attack, and Palestinian minister Nabil Shaath claimed that Palestinians were continuing to try to halt attacks on Israel, despite the Israeli actions. The bus attack occurred a week after the Hebrew University bombing, in which a Palestinian attacker affiliated with Hamas killed 9 people.

On 27 August, Israeli authorities arrested 7 Arab-Israelis, all members of the same family, who allegedly assisted the bomber. According to police, the suspects helped store explosives in a nursery school, dressed the bomber as a tourist, and scouted the target.

In 2019, Israeli Defense Minister Naftali Bennett signed an order enabling Israel to seize "pay-for-slay" payments from the Palestinian Authority to Arab Israelis convicted on terrorism charges. This order included two prisoners who Israeli claimed assisted the Meron Junction bomber.
