= 2002 Herzliya bombing =

Suicide bombing in Herzliya, Israel

- Part of the Second Intifada militancy campaign
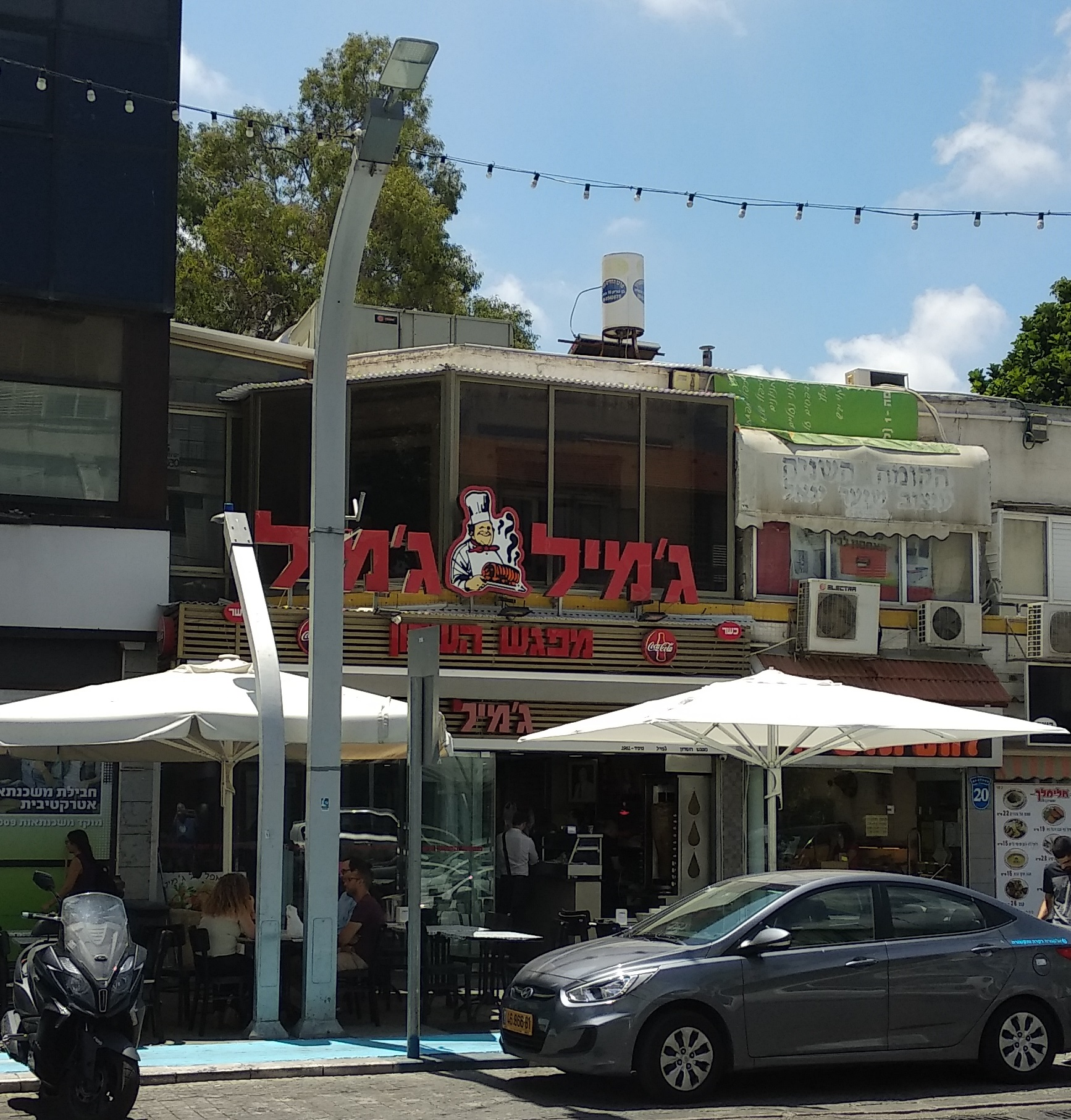
- Jamil (Mifgash Ha'Sharon) restaurant

- The attack site
- Native name: הפיגוע במפגש השרון ג'מיל בהרצליה
- Location: 32°10′02″N 34°50′31″E "Mifgash Ha'Sharon" restaurant, Herzliya, Israel
- Date: June 11, 2002; 24 years ago c. 7:30 pm (UTC+2)
- Attack type: Suicide bombing
- Weapon: Pipe bomb
- Deaths: 1 Israeli teenager (+1 bomber)
- Injuries: 15 Israeli civilians
- Perpetrator: Al-Aqsa Martyrs Brigades claimed responsibility
- No. of participants: 1

The 2002 Herzliya bombing took place on June 11, 2002, when a Palestinian suicide bomber set off a bomb at the Jamil (Mifgash Ha'Sharon) restaurant in the Israeli beach suburb of Herzliya. The event resulted in the death of one teenager, Hadar Hershkowitz, and the injury of 15 people. The attack led Israel to lodge a formal complaint with the UN security council, citing it as evidence for a "campaign of Palestinian terrorism" against Israeli civilians.

== The attack ==
At about 7:30 pm, a Palestinian suicide bomber set off a pipe bomb in the Shawarma restaurant "Mifgash Ha'Sharon" (AKA "Jamil"), where about 30 people were sitting. The pipe bomb used in the attack was said to have been "relatively small." A rescue worker said that one of the explosive devices the bomber was wearing did not detonate. According to Israel, the explosives had been packed with nails and ball bearings. A 14-year-old girl, Hadar Hershkowitz, was killed in the attack and 15 additional people were injured in the attack.

According to Israeli sources, earlier that day, three Israeli high school students were injured when Palestinian militants attacked their school bus. One student was seriously injured. That same day, a Palestinian militant stabbed an Israeli policeman in Jerusalem.

== The perpetrator ==
The Al-Aqsa Martyrs Brigades, a military wing of Fatah, claimed responsibility for the attack, stating that it was "in retaliation for the daily incursions by the occupation forces against the cities, towns, villages and refugee camps". The Al-Aqsa Martyrs Brigades spokesman stated that the suicide bomber was a 30-year-old Palestinian named Omar Zayadeh who originated from the Palestinian village of Ma'adama in the West Bank.

== Aftermath ==
In 2003, Israeli troops demolished the home of the bomber.

According to Palestinian Media Watch, an Israel-based media watchdog organization, in 2010 the Palestinian Authority built a monument honoring the bomber in the town square of the West Bank town of Madama. The monument, in the form of a pyramid, features portraits of Yasser Arafat and of the bomber. Below the bomber's portrait are the words, "The heroic Shahada – Seeker (Martyrdom- Seeker) Omar Muhammad Ziyada (Abu Samed) who carried out the heroic Herzliya operation on June 11, 2002."

== Official reactions ==
Involved parties

Israel: David Baker, an official in Sharon's office, condemned the attack as "another example of the Palestinians' intention to commit murder for the sake of murder".

Palestinian territories:

- Palestinian National Authority: PA officials condemned the attack, stating it was wrong to attack innocent people on the street. In the statement, the authority said it would do its "utmost" to prevent future attacks.
- Senior Hamas officials said the attack is "a natural response to Israel's crimes in the territories."

== See also ==
- 2006 Tel Aviv shawarma restaurant bombing
