= Sonol gas station bombing =

Attack on a petrol station near a West Bank settlement, 27 October 2002

- Part of the Second Intifada
- The attack site
- Location: 32°06′29″N 35°09′49″E; Ariel, West Bank
- Date: 27 October 2002; 24 years ago c. 11:30 am (UTC+2)
- Attack type: Suicide bombing
- Weapon: Suicide vest
- Deaths: 3 soldiers (+1 bomber)
- Injuries: ≈18 (mostly soldiers)
- Perpetrator: Hamas claimed responsibility

The Sonol gas station bombing was a double suicide bombing attack which occurred on 27 October 2002, near a Sonol gas station located at the entrance to Ariel, an Israeli settlement city in the West Bank. Three people were killed in the attack and approximately 18 people were injured. All of the fatalities were IDF reservists. Hamas claimed responsibility for the attack.

== The attack ==
On Sunday, 27 October 2002, around 11:30 am, a young Palestinian suicide bomber approached a gas station cafeteria at the entrance to Ariel. The gas station cafeteria was full of Israeli soldiers who were waiting for their bus.

As the suicide bomber approached the gas station, a worker at the nearby cafeteria spotted him and informed her boss that the man looked suspicious. The owner of the cafeteria Menachem Gilboa and an attendant at the gas station approached the suspect, identified him as a terrorist, wrestled him to the floor and held his arms, thus preventing him from detonating his explosive device. By doing so Gilboa noticed that the suspect was wearing an explosives belt underneath his shirt. The two screamed for help and subsequently three soldiers ran towards them to assist them subdue the terrorist.

The three soldiers who tried to subdue the bomber were killed in the explosion. 20 people additional people were injured in the explosion, one of them seriously.

As a result of the explosion, a small fire broke out at the gas station, which was later on quickly put out by the firefighters.

The Islamist militant organization Hamas claimed responsibility for the attack.

== Israeli retaliation ==
A few hours after the attack Israel sent military troops into northern West Bank to the town of Jenin to capture militants associated with the attack. During the operation the Israeli military force was caught in an exchange of fire with the militia forces who refused to turn themselves in. Three members of the al-Aqsa Martyrs' Brigades were killed during the exchange of fire. Two Israeli soldiers were injured in the incident.

== Official reactions ==
Involved parties

Palestinian territories:

- Palestinian National Authority – PNA officials condemned the attack and stated that its security forces are unable to act against Palestinian militant groups because Israeli troops have taken over most cities in the West Bank.
