= Karkur junction suicide bombing =

Palestinian terror attack on Israelis

Karkur junction bus bombing
- Part of the Second Intifada militancy campaign
- The attack site
- Location: Karkur junction, Wadi Ara, Israel
- Date: 21 October 2002; 24 years ago
- Attack type: Suicide bomber
- Deaths: 7 soldiers; 7 civilians; 2 attackers
- Injuries: 50+
- Perpetrator: Islamic Jihad

The Karkur junction bus bombing was a suicide attack on 21 October 2002, at the Karkur junction near Wadi Ara, Israel. The attack, carried out by Islamic Jihad, killed 14 passengers and wounded 50.

== The attack ==
Egged commuter bus 841 was on Route No. 65 from Kiryat Shmona to Tel Aviv when it stopped at the Karkur junction, about eight kilometres (5.0 mi) from Hadera at the afternoon rush hour. A passenger got on and spoke to driver Chaim Avraham, but before he could answer, a jeep loaded with an estimated 100 kilograms (220 lb) of TNT rammed the back of the bus, causing an explosion. A fire broke out, causing a chain of explosions from the ammunition carried by soldiers who were riding the bus. The explosion ignited the fuel tank, leaving the bus completely gutted. The blaze initially prevented the police and rescue workers from approaching the bus, which was reduced to a blackened skeleton.

Seven Israeli soldiers and seven civilians were killed in the attack, and 50 passengers were wounded.

== Official reactions ==
The Palestinian Authority said it condemned the suicide bombing. An Israeli official expressed skepticism, declaring that "The Palestinian Authority has become a prime authority on terror and could not care less about preventing it."

== See also ==
- Israeli casualties of war – Overview of Israeli casualties during armed conflict
