= King George Street bombing =

2002 street bombing in Jerusalem

- Part of the Second Intifada militancy campaign
- The attack site
- Location: 31°46′55″N 35°13′01″E; King George Street, Jerusalem
- Date: March 21, 2002; 24 years ago 4:25 pm (UTC+2)
- Attack type: Suicide bombing
- Weapon: Suicide vest
- Deaths: 3 civilians (+1 suicide bomber)
- Injuries: 40 civilians (several seriously)
- Perpetrator: al-Aqsa Martyrs Brigades claimed responsibility

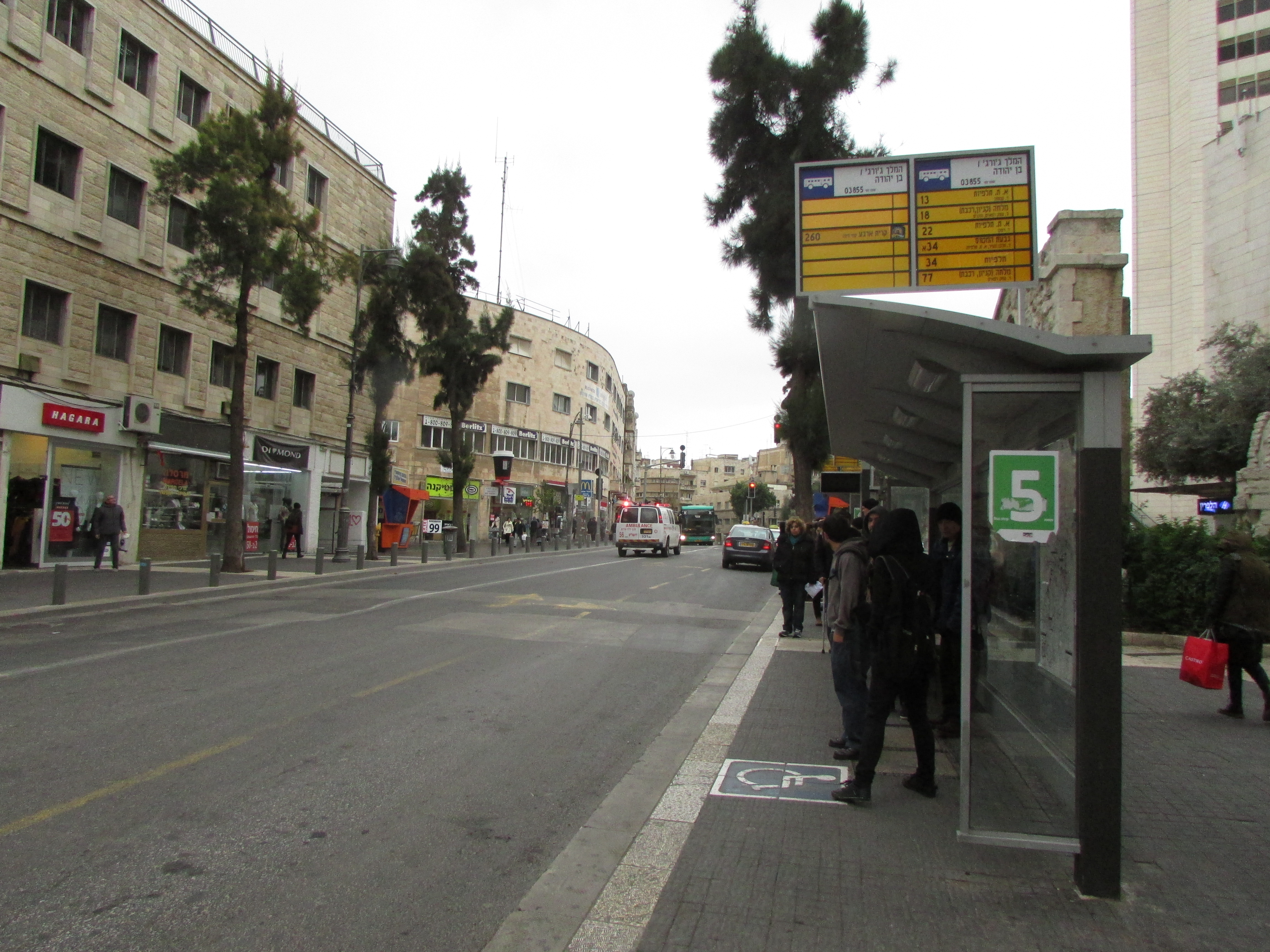
King George street

A suicide bombing occurred on March 21, 2002, outside a clothing store and toy shop on King George Street in Jerusalem. Three Israeli civilians were killed in the attack and 86 people were injured (several seriously).

== The attack ==
On Thursday afternoon, 21 March 2002, a Palestinian suicide bomber detonated the explosive device, hidden underneath his jacket, in the middle of Jerusalem's shopping district in the King George Street in downtown Jerusalem amongst a crowd of shoppers.

The blast killed three civilians and more than 40 people were wounded, seven of them seriously.

== The perpetrators ==
After the attack the Palestinian militia al-Aqsa Martyrs Brigades claimed responsibility for the bombing and stated that the perpetrator was Mohammad Hashaika, a 22-year-old from the West Bank village of Talluza near Nablus. Hashaika was a member of the Tanzim and a former Palestinian policeman. Later on, it was revealed that Hashaika was actually arrested for allegedly planning to carry out an earlier attack. Nevertheless, the Palestinian authority released him a week before he managed to carry out this suicide bombing.
