= Megiddo Junction bus bombing =

2002 suicide bombing in Israel

- Part of the Second Intifada militancy campaign
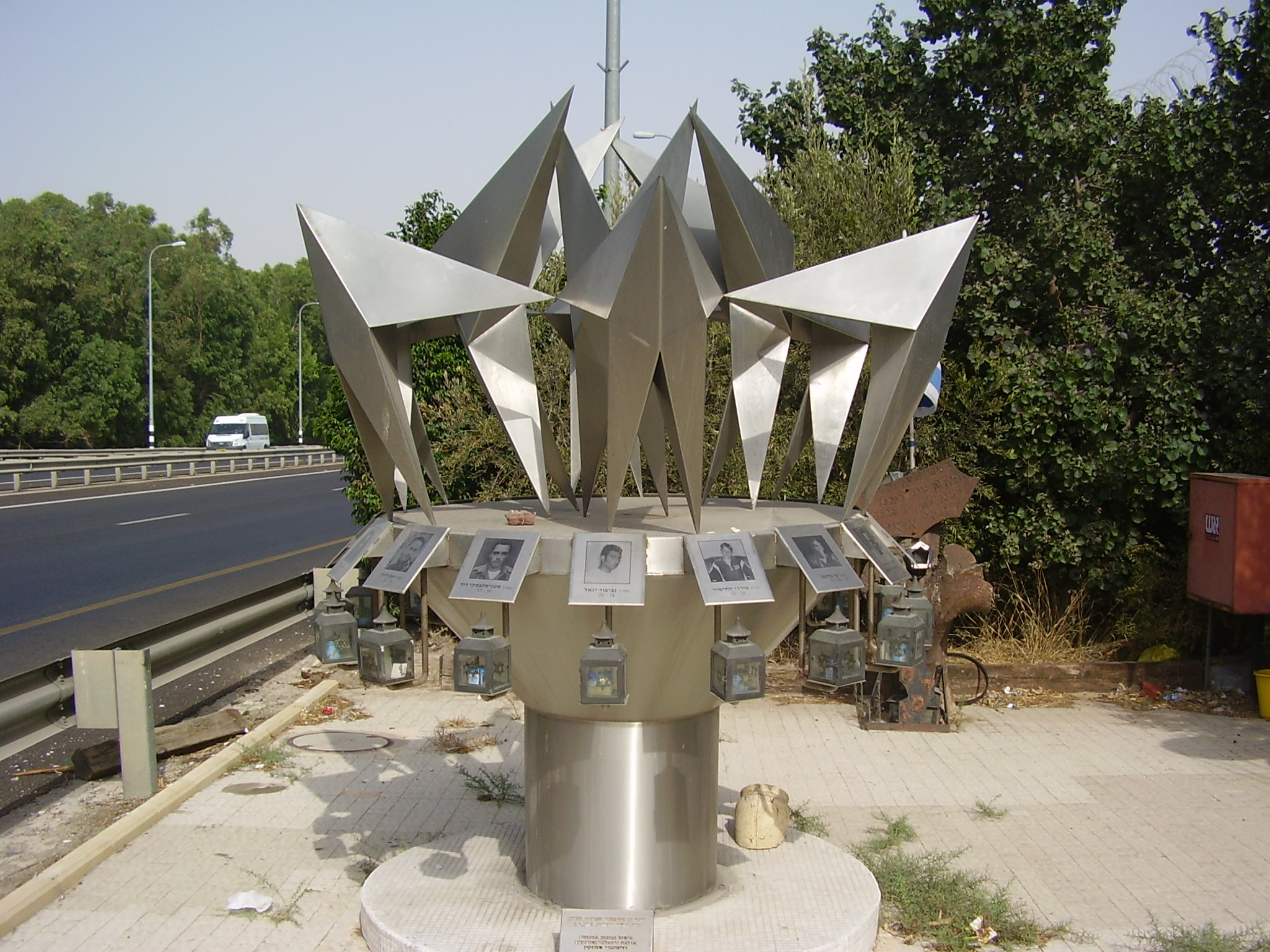
- The memorial built near the attack site in memory of the victims

- The attack site
- Location: 32°34′22″N 35°11′31″E; Israel
- Date: June 5, 2002; 24 years ago 7:15 am (GMT+2)
- Attack type: Suicide bombing, car bombing
- Deaths: 17 (+1 bomber)
- Injuries: 43 Israelis (mostly soldiers)
- Perpetrator: Islamic Jihad claimed responsibility
- Assailant: Hamza Samudi

The Megiddo Junction bus bombing was the suicide bombing of an Egged bus at Megiddo Junction in northern Israel on June 5, 2002. 17 people were killed and 43 wounded, the majority of them IDF soldiers.

The Palestinian Islamist militant organization Islamic Jihad claimed responsibility for the attack.

== Attack ==
On 5 June 2002, a Palestinian suicide bomber drove a Renault van loaded with dozens of kilograms of explosives to Highway 65. At Megiddo Junction, he approached Egged bus no. 830, filled with passengers, traveling from Tel Aviv to Tiberias. At 7:15 am, the bomber detonated the explosive device near the fuel tank of the bus, causing it to burst into flames. According to a member of the rescue crew, "people were thrown out of the bus by the force of the bomb" and rescuers could not board the vehicle immediately due to the extreme heat.

The blast killed 13 Israeli soldiers and four civilians. 43 passengers were injured, most of them soldiers. One of the civilian casualties, Eliyahu Timsit, wasn't identified for six months. The mystery of the unidentified victim inspired filmmaker David Ofek to perform an investigation which ultimately led to a successful identification of the last victim. The investigative process resulted in the documentary named The 17th Victim which was released in 2003.

== Perpetrators and retaliation ==
After the attack the Palestinian Islamist terror organization Islamic Jihad claimed responsibility for the attack and stated that the attack was carried out by an 18-year-old Palestinian named Hamza Samudi who originated from Jenin and had taken driving lessons four days before the attack, especially for this mission. In response, Israeli forces put Yasser Arafat under siege in his Ramallah compound once again.

Iyad Sawalha, the perpetrator who assembled the car bomb, was eliminated by IDF special forces from Sayeret Golani and Egoz Unit on November 9.
