= 2002 Tel Aviv outdoor mall bombing =

Palestinian terror attack in Israel

- Part of the Second Intifada militancy campaign
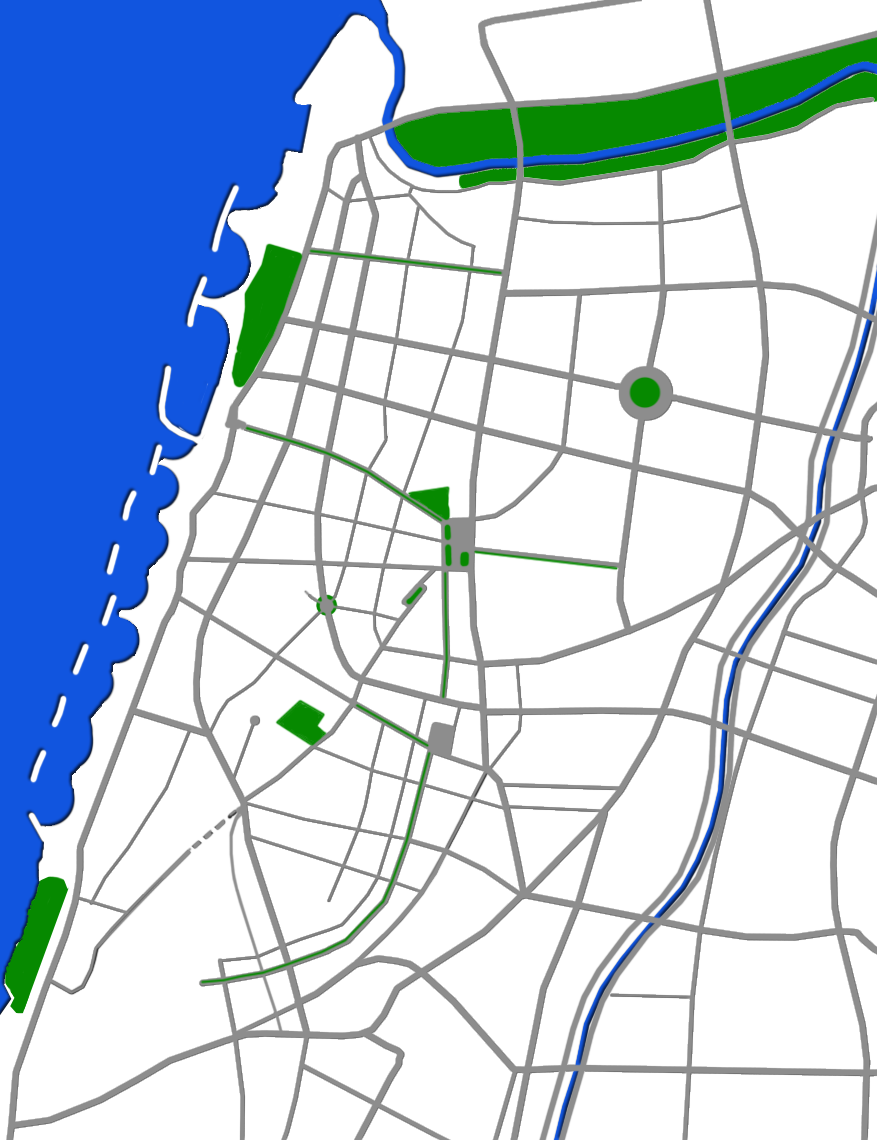
- Location: 32°03′35″N 34°46′47″E; Tel Aviv, Israel
- Date: 25 January 2002; 24 years ago
- Target: Civilians
- Attack type: Suicide bombing
- Weapon: Suicide belt
- Deaths: 1 bomber
- Injuries: 24 civilians
- Perpetrator: Islamic Jihad claimed responsibility for the attack.

On 25 January 2002, a Palestinian suicide bomber injured at least 24 civilians in Tel Aviv, Israel. Afterwards, the Palestinian militant organization Islamic Jihad claimed responsibility.

== Background ==
The week before the attack, IDF forces had assassinated four senior members of the Izz ad-Din al-Qassam Brigades during a raid of their hideout in Nablus.

On 24 January 2002, an Israeli helicopter assassinated Bakr Hamdan in the Gaza Strip, the leader of the Izz ad-Din al-Qassam Brigades, which Israeli security official said was responsible for "dozens of terrorist attacks carried out against Israeli civilians and soldiers in the Gaza Strip."

== The attack ==
On 25 January 2002, at 11:15 A.M., a Palestinian suicide bomber carrying hidden explosives attached to his body which were filled with shrapnel, blew himself up in a crowded pedestrian mall adjacent to the old abandoned bus station in Tel Aviv.

At least 24 people were injured in the attack, three of them critically wounded, four were moderately wounded and the rest were lightly wounded.

== Perpetrators ==
Islamic Jihad took responsibility for the attack in a statement given to the Lebanese TV station Al-Manar. In this statement, they said that the suicide bomber was 17-year-old Safwat Abdurrahman Khalil, a resident of the Palestinian town Beit Wazan near Nablus.

Immediately after the attack, Israeli police forces at the site of the attack found an abandoned AK-47 rifle and caught the suicide bomber's partner, who was allegedly supposed to use the rifle in order to increase the number of casualties in the attack. The suicide bomber's partner, who was from Nablus, was reportedly carrying a Koran in which the date and place of the attack were written.

== Reactions ==
Involved parties

Israel:

- Senior Israeli officials stated that Israeli sees the Palestinian leadership and Palestinian leader Yasser Arafat as responsible for the attack, whom they said are doing nothing to prevent the attacks.

Palestinian territories:

- The Palestinian Authority issued a statement in which it condemned "any act that harms Israeli civilians".

== Response ==
In response to the bombing, at nightfall an Israeli F-16 attacked the Palestinian security headquarters in Gaza located near Yasser Arafat's compound. In addition, the F-16 fired two missiles at national security and intelligence buildings in Tulkarm. According to Palestinian medical officials, two Palestinian were injured in the Tulkarm attack.

In March 2002, the Israeli Arab Nasser Fahemi, a resident of Tira at the time, was tried at the HaShalom court in Kfar Saba for enabling the perpetrators of the 2002 Tel Aviv outdoor mall bombing to stay at his home until a vehicle reached his house and transported them to the site of the attack, and for providing them advice on how not to get caught. Fahemi admitted the charges and was sentenced to three years in prison and one year probation.

== See also ==
- List of terrorist incidents, 2002
