= Pi Glilot bombing attempt =

2002 foiled attack attempt in Tel Aviv, Israel

- Part of Second Intifada
- Pi Glilot bombing attempt (Central Israel)
- Native name: Hebrew: ניסיון הפיגוע בחוות הדלק והגז פי גלילות
- Location: 32°08′26″N 34°48′16″E north of Tel Aviv, Israel
- Date: May 23, 2002; 24 years ago
- Attack type: Bombing attack
- Weapon: Remote controlled explosive weapon

The Pi Glilot bombing was an attempted bombing of the Pi Glilot LPG depot north of Tel Aviv, Israel on May 23, 2002. The attempt was failed, resulting in no injuries.

== Before ==
Before the attack, several attempts were made to find a suitable place to relocate the Pi Glilot facility away from a densely populated area. These attempts were blocked by local governments who did not want the gas depot to be built in their jurisdictions.

The incident also occurred two weeks after the end of Operation Defensive Shield, a military operation by the Israel Defense Forces in the West Bank in which they carried out raids, such as during the Battle of Jenin and the Siege of the Church of the Nativity.

== Attack ==
On Thursday, May 23, 2002, Israeli truck driver Yitzhak Ginsburg drove a tanker truck into the Pi Glilot gas depot, pulling up next to eight other parked fuel tankers. As the truck was being filled with diesel, a bomb on the underside of the truck was detonated, causing the truck to rupture and catch fire. Ginsburg was thrown from the vehicle but was not injured. Safety workers at the facility put out the fire using sprinkler systems.

Israeli police claimed that the bomb had been placed on the truck by a Palestinian terrorist while the truck was parked overnight in a publicly accessible lot near the facility. They said that the individual waited for the truck to be refueled, then detonated the bomb using a remote-control device, possibly a mobile phone. According to investigators, the perpetrator watched the tanker from a nearby vantage point.

Israeli officials said that if the plot had succeeded, the fire could have spread to nearby gas tanks stored in the Pi Glilot facility, which held about 3,000 tons of gas and 80 million liters of fuel. This could have sparked a chain reaction, resulting in an explosion that would create a shock wave powerful enough to destroy cars and buildings in the area, and a massive fireball that would have consumed everything within a radius of several kilometers. The results would have been devastating due to the Pi Glilot depot's location. The depot was located in Herzliya, north of the upscale Tel Aviv neighborhood of Ramat Aviv and near the city of Ramat HaSharon. The depot also stood next to the Glilot Junction on Highway 2, one of Israel's busiest traffic arteries. The headquarters of Mossad, Shin Bet, and Israeli Military Intelligence are located at the Glilot Junction. If the truck had been carrying a more volatile fuel than diesel, such as gasoline, disaster would have been more likely.

The Pi Glilot bombing attempt was one of many attacks that occurred in May 2002 as part of the Second Intifada.

== Aftermath ==
After the attack, operations at the Pi Glilot facility were suspended. The government demanded that the facility be shut down within 90 days, but changed its mind and allowed it to remain open until 2004.

In the immediate aftermath, no Palestinian organization claimed responsibility for the attack. Later, in November 2002, the Shin Bet reported that a Hamas group that was responsible for the Pi Glilot bombing and other attacks. Three people accused of being members of a Hamas cell in Jerusalem that allegedly orchestrated the Pi Glilot attack were given life sentences for other attacks.
