= Nahariya train station suicide bombing =

2001 suicide bombing in Nahariya, Israel

- Part of the Second Intifada militancy campaign
- The attack site
- Location: 33°00′20″N 35°05′55″E; Nahariya, Israel
- Date: September 9, 2001; 25 years ago
- Attack type: Suicide bombing
- Deaths: 3 civilians (+1 bomber)
- Injuries: 94
- Perpetrator: Hamas claimed responsibility

The Nahariya train station suicide bombing occurred on September 9, 2001 in the Nahariya Railway Station in Nahariya, Israel. This terror attack was executed, for the first time in the Second Intifada, by an Arab-Israeli who was sent by Hamas and detonated himself on the crowded platform. 3 people were killed in the attack and 94 people were injured.

The Palestinian Islamist militant organization Hamas claimed responsibility for the attack.

== The attack ==
On the morning of September 9, 2001, a suicide bomber entered the Nahariya Railway Station wearing hidden explosives attached to his body. After the train entered the station, soldiers and civilians began stepping onto the platform. The bomber advanced toward them and blew up the explosives on his body in the crowd, killing three Israeli soldiers who were on their way to their military bases, as well as injuring 94 people.

== The assailant ==
The suicide bomber was Mohammed Shakur Habeishi, a 48-year-old Israeli-Arab who was a husband of two wives and had six children. Habeishi lived in Abu Sinan, a small Arab village in northern Israel, which lies only eight miles east of Nahariya. Habeishi who was born and raised in Israel and became religious during the early 1980s. Later on he became an active member of the Islamic Movement in Israel and eventually he decided to cooperate with the military wing of Hamas in order to commit a terror attack in Israel.

== Aftermath ==
In response to the attack, Israel launched a counter-terror attack on four different targets in the West Bank which included buildings in Ramallah used by the Tanzim militia and a building used by the Fatah movement. There were no casualties in the attacks.
