= Karnei Shomron Mall suicide bombing =

Suicide Bombing in Palestine, 16 February 2002

- Part of the Second Intifada militancy campaign
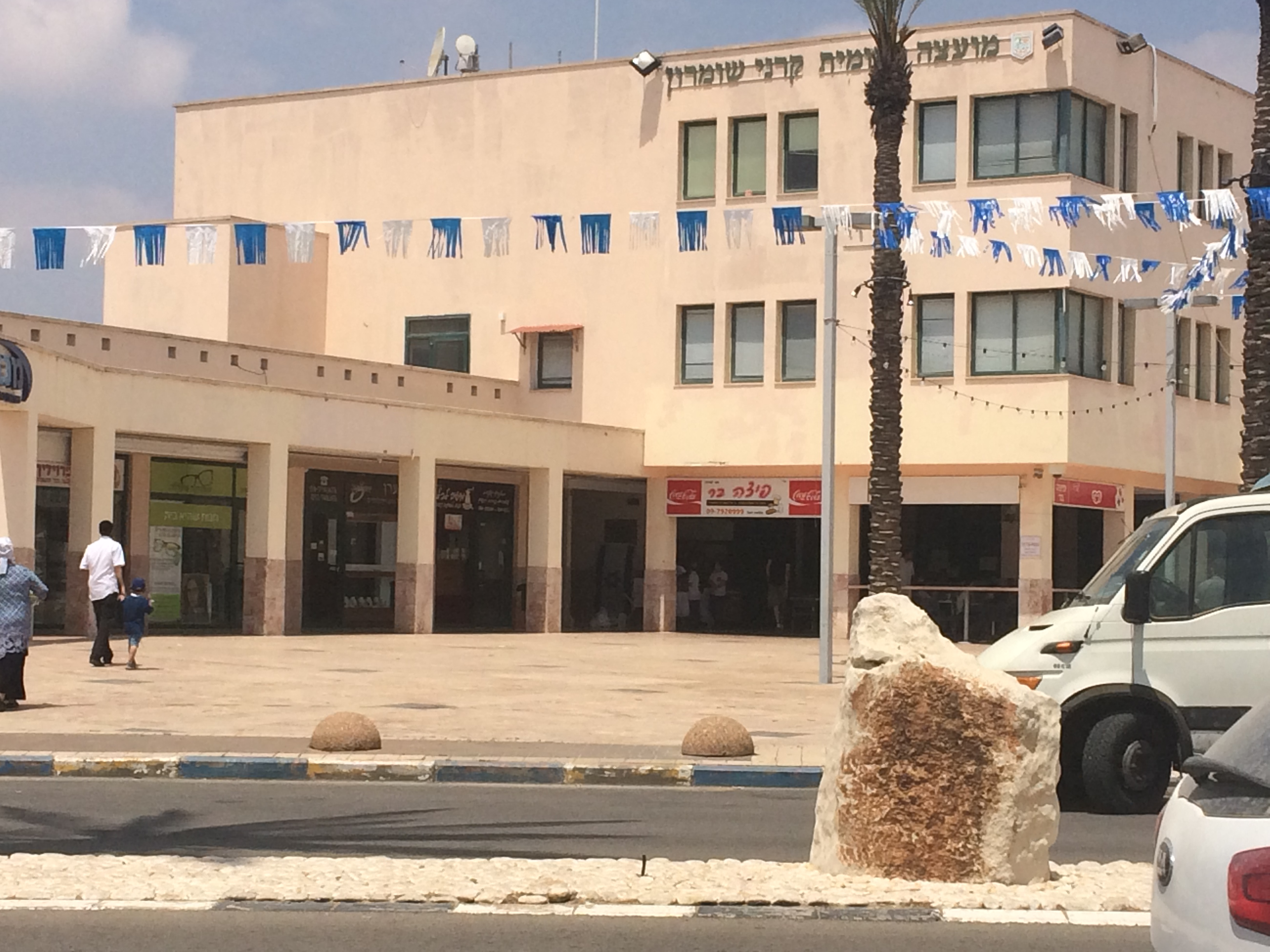
- Karnei Shomron Mall, the attack place.

- Location: 32°10′29″N 35°05′28″E; Karnei Shomron, West Bank
- Date: 16 February 2002; 24 years ago c. 7:45 PM (GMT+2)
- Attack type: Suicide bombing
- Weapon: Suicide vest
- Deaths: 3 civilians (+1 suicide bomber)
- Injuries: 30 civilians (6 of them seriously)
- Perpetrator: Popular Front for the Liberation of Palestine claimed responsibility

The Karnei Shomron Mall suicide bombing was a Palestinian suicide bombing which occurred on February 16, 2002 in the Israeli settlement of Karnei Shomron. Three teenagers were killed in the attack.

The Palestinian militant organization Popular Front for the Liberation of Palestine claimed responsibility for the attack.

== The attack ==
On Saturday night, 16 February 2002, a Palestinian suicide bomber, who was wearing a 25-pound nail-studded explosive device strapped to his body, approached the popular crowded open mall in the Karnei Shomron settlement located in the West Bank. It was the first suicide bombing at a West Bank settlement.

The militant detonated the bomb at the entrance to a pizza parlor at about 7:45 p.m. The blast killed three teenagers (a 15-year-old girl, a 16-year-old girl, and a 15-year-old boy) and injured 27 people, six of them seriously. Two of the teenagers were killed instantly, while a third died of her wounds on February 27.

== The perpetrators ==
Officials from the Palestinian militant organization Popular Front for the Liberation of Palestine claimed responsibility for the attack and stated that the bomber was Sadek Abdel Hafeth, an 18-year-old Palestinian from the nearby town of Qalqilya.

== See also ==
- List of terrorist incidents, 2002
