= Yagur Junction bombing =

2002 terrorist attack in Israel

- Part of the Second Intifada militancy campaign
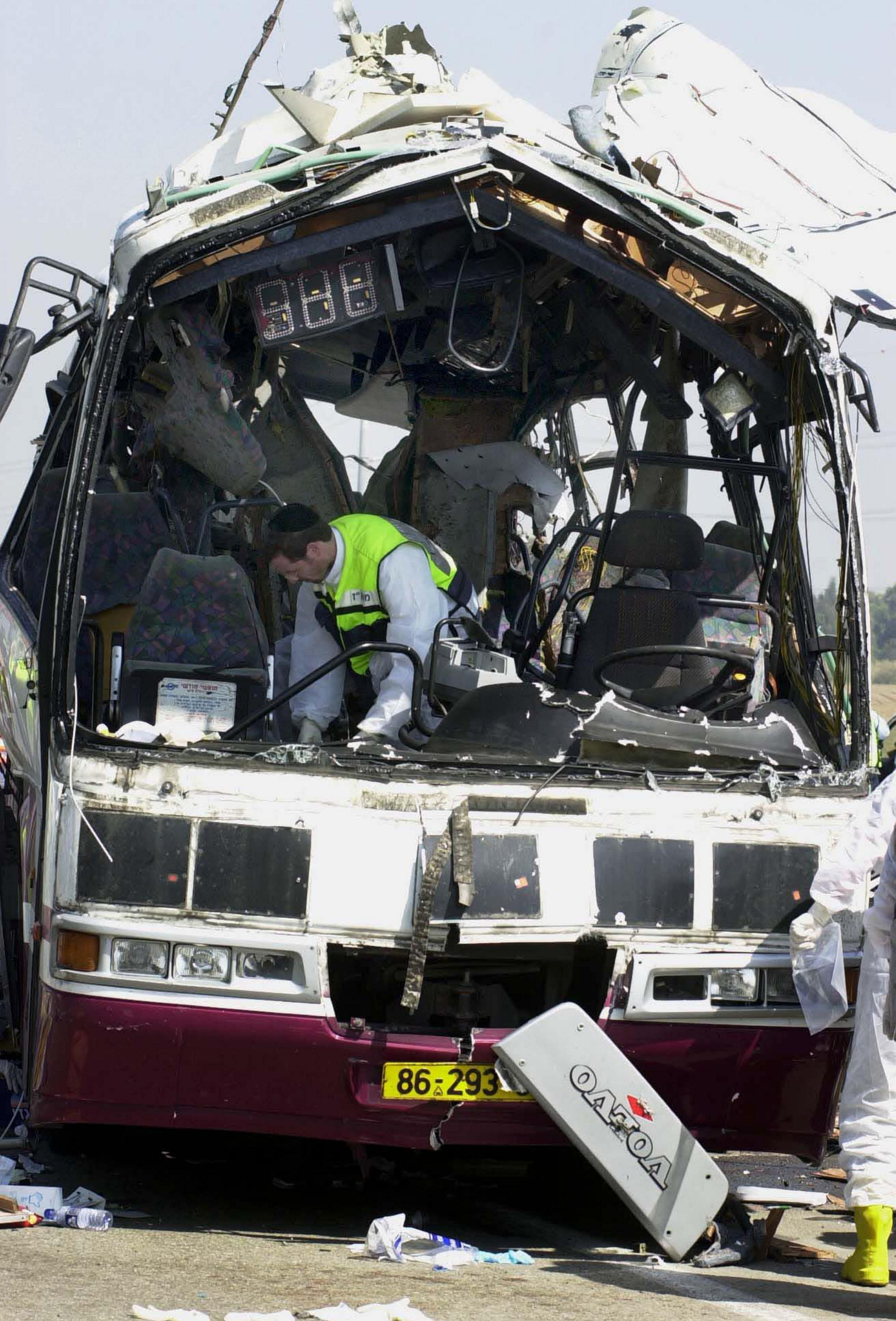

- The attack site
- Location: 32°45′12″N 35°04′16″E; Yagur Junction, Israel
- Date: April 10, 2002; 24 years ago 7:15 AM (UTC+2)
- Attack type: Suicide bombing
- Weapon: Suicide vest
- Deaths: 6 Israeli soldiers and 2 civilians (+1 bomber)
- Injuries: 19
- Perpetrator: Hamas

The Yagur Junction bombing was a Palestinian suicide bombing which occurred on April 10, 2002, on an Egged commuter bus line number 960 which was passing through Yagur Junction in northern Israel. 8 people were killed in the attack and 19 people were injured. The Palestinian Islamist group Hamas took responsibility for the bombing.

== Bombing ==
At 7:30am, a suicide bomber blew himself up on Egged commuter bus line number 960 as it was passing through Yagur Junction in northern Israel, east of Haifa. Eight people were killed and 14 were injured in the bombing. A number of motorists were injured when their cars were hurled from the highway as a result of the blast.

== Reaction ==
The bombing was the fourth in the 13 days since Israel launched Operation Defensive Shield. Later on 10 April, Hamas senior leader Ismail Abu Shanab claimed responsibility on behalf of Hamas for the bombing, saying the bombing "is a clear message that our people will not surrender and will not give up."

In a meeting after the bombing, the Israeli security cabinet decided that Operation Defensive Shield would continue and called off any further withdrawals from towns in the West Bank.
