= 2002 Immanuel bus attack =

Ambush

Coordinates: 32°9′35.7″N 35°8′48.9″E

Immanuel bus attack
- Part of the Second Intifada militancy campaign
- The attack site
- Location: Immanuel, West Bank
- Date: July 16, 2002; 15:00 pm
- Attack type: Ambush, Mass murder, spree killing, Bombing, Shooting attack
- Weapons: AK-47 rifles, hand grenades, a roadside bomb
- Deaths: 9 Israeli civilians
- Injuries: 20 Israeli civilians
- Perpetrators: DFLP and Fatah

The Immanuel bus attack was an ambush attack by Palestinian militants against Israeli civilians on 16 July 2002. It was carried out by three Palestinians disguised as Israeli soldiers. The attack came less than a year after the 2001 Immanuel bus attack.

Nine people were killed in the attack, including them an 8 month old baby and a premature infant delivered after his mother, Yehudit Weinberg, was seriously injured. 20 people suffered various degrees of injuries.

The attackers first detonated a roadside bomb next to an armored civilian Dan No. 189 bus. Immediately afterwards, the terrorists opened fire and threw hand grenades at the passengers. Nine Israelis were killed in the attack and 20 people suffered various degrees of injuries.

The attack was claimed by the Democratic Front for the Liberation of Palestine (DFLP) and coordinated with Fatah.

== The attack ==
On Tuesday afternoon, 16 July 2002, three armed Palestinians militants disguised as Israeli soldiers planted a roadside bomb beside the road leading to the Jewish settlement of Immanuel, about 200 meters before the entrance to the town. After placing the bomb, the assailants ambushed a bus on its way from Bnei Brak.

At about 15:00 an armored Dan bus line 189, en route to Immanuel from Bnei Brak, approached the site as the roadside bomb exploded. As a result of the explosion, the bus was immobilized. The terrorists fired small arms at the bus and threw hand grenades at the passengers through its roof and windows.

== Victims ==
Nine people were killed in the attack and 20 people suffered various degrees of injuries.

- Galila Ades, 42, of Emmanuel
- Yocheved Ben-Hanan, 21, of Emmanuel
- Yonatan Gamliel, 16, of Emmanuel
- Keren Kashani, 29, of Emmanuel
- Sarah Tiferet Shilon, 8 months, of Emmanuel
- Gal Shilon (Sarah's father), 32, of Emmanuel
- Zilpa Kashi (Sarah's grandmother), 65, of Givatayim
- Ilana Siton, 35, of Emmanuel
- The premature infant delivered after its mother, Yehudit Weinberg, was seriously injured, died of his injuries overnight.

Gal Shilon was not on the bus. He was at home in Immanuel when his wife Ayelet Shilon who was on the bus called him to tell him about the attack. He rushed to help them and was killed by the terrorists' gunfire.

== See also ==
- Israeli casualties of war
