= Hebrew University bombing =

2002 Hamas bombing in Jerusalem

- Part of the Second Intifada
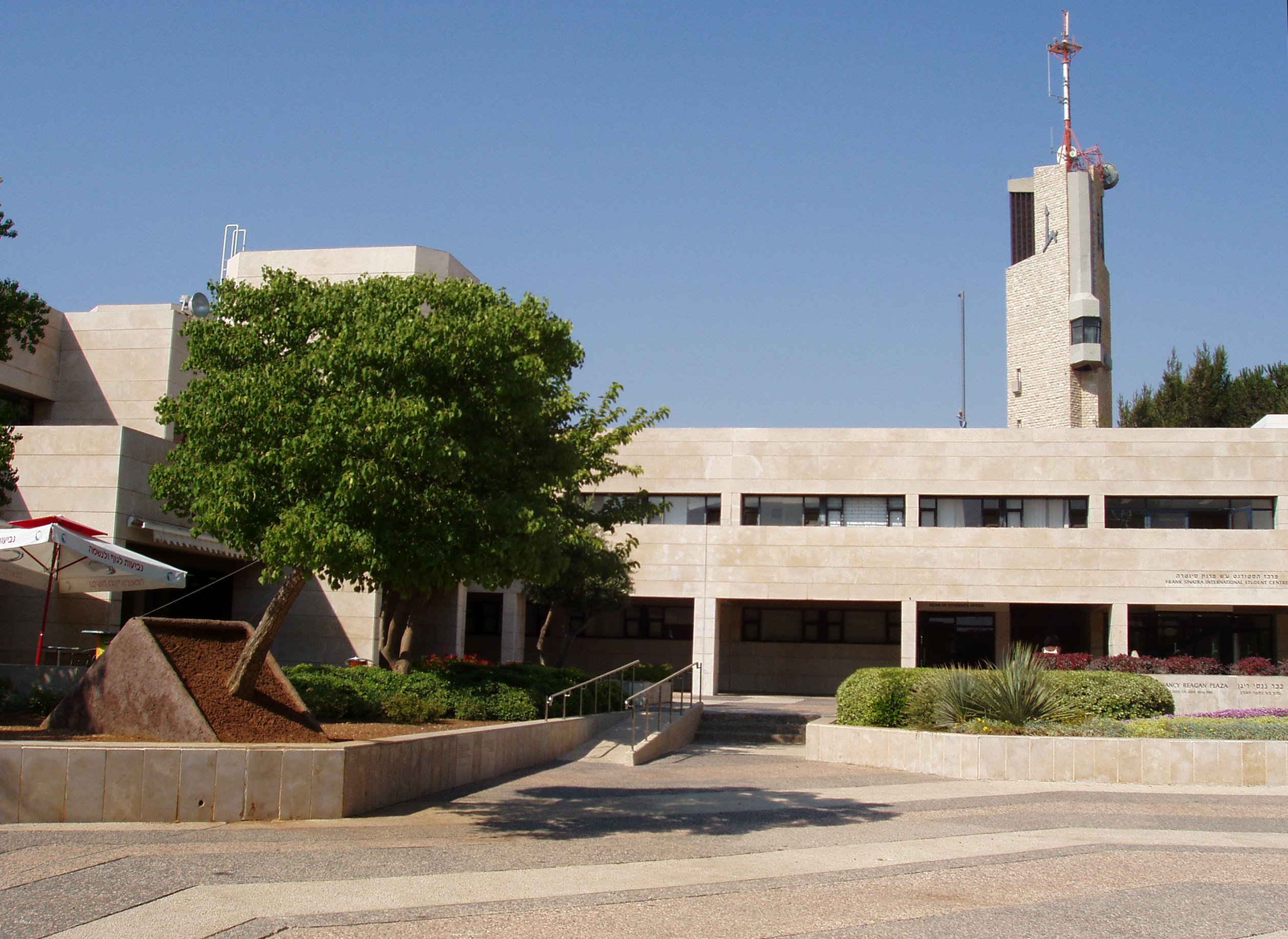
- The site of the bombing, with a memorial to the victims in the foreground

- The attack site
- Native name: הפיגוע באוניברסיטה העברית
- Location: 31°47′33″N 35°14′44″E; Mount Scopus campus, Jerusalem
- Date: 31 July 2002 c. 13:30 pm
- Target: University cafeteria
- Attack type: School bombing, mass murder, terrorism
- Weapon: Explosive device
- Deaths: 9 civilians
- Injuries: ≈ 100
- Perpetrator: Hamas claimed of responsibility

The Hebrew University bombing, also called the Hebrew University massacre, was carried out by the Palestinian militant group Hamas on 31 July 2002 in a cafeteria at the Mount Scopus campus of the Hebrew University of Jerusalem. The attack killed 9 people, including 5 U.S. students, and injured about 100. It was carried out by an East Jerusalem-based Hamas cell whose members are serving multiple life sentences in Israeli prisons for that attack and others. The attack, which reportedly sparked a celebration among “hundreds of Hamas supporters” in Gaza City, was condemned by United Nations Secretary General Kofi Annan and several countries.

In February 2015, a United States jury in the Federal District Court of Manhattan found the Palestinian Authority and the Palestine Liberation Organization liable for having supported and helped to fund terror attacks in the 2000s and they were ordered to pay damages in the amount of $218.5 million to victims of said attacks.

== Attack ==
The bombing took place during the summer examination period, while summer Hebrew-language courses were being taught. At lunchtime, the attacker placed the bomb on a table in the middle of the crowded cafeteria in the Frank Sinatra International Student Center on the university's Mount Scopus campus. He covered it with a newspaper and sprinkled perfume on top to disguise the smell of the explosive. After walking away, he detonated the bomb with a cell phone. In the minutes after the explosion, dazed, blood-spattered students emerged from the building; the air smelled of smoke and burnt flesh.

== Fatalities ==
Six women and three men were killed in the attack. Seven died immediately and two died of their wounds in the following weeks. About 100 people were injured in the attack. The wounded included Israelis, Arabs, four Americans and three South Koreans.

== Perpetrator ==
Shin Bet arrested five people in response to the attack. During interrogation, they revealed they had planted another bomb they had not yet detonated, which was later found and disarmed. Israel deduced that Muhammad Odeh, a painter at the university, had carried out the attack due to his access from his ID card. In January 2025, he was released as part of the hostage exchange during the 2025 Israel–Hamas war ceasefire.

== Reactions ==
=== Hamas claim of responsibility ===
Palestinian Islamist organization Hamas claimed responsibility for the bombing during a rally in Gaza City attended by some 10,000 supporters. A masked Hamas speaker said: "This operation today is a part of a series of operations we will launch from everywhere in Palestine". At the speakers' request, the entire crowd knelt to pray that future Hamas attacks "would succeed against the enemy of God". Hamas claimed the attack was revenge for the Israeli targeted killing of the organization's military chief, Salah Shehadeh.

=== Celebration ===
Later in the day, hundreds of Hamas supporters poured into the streets of Gaza City to celebrate the bombing and vowed more attacks. Hamas official Ismail Haniyeh, who later became the de facto Prime Minister of the Gaza Strip, said: "If they are going to attack our children, then they will have to expect to drink from the same poison."

=== Condemnations ===
Involved parties

- Israel:
  - The government called the bombing "a despicable act so horrendous it defies words", and stated that the ultimate blame for it lay with Palestinian Authority President Yasser Arafat.
  - Hebrew University President Menachem Magidor wrote: "The attackers' decision to strike precisely at our campus, which is a center of tolerance and pluralism, is frightening... We must not give in. We must grit our teeth and carry on. Giving up on what we are trying to create at the university is a surrender to terror."
- Palestine:
  - The Palestinian Authority stated that it "absolutely condemns the attack", but laid the blame at the feet of Israeli prime minister Ariel Sharon, for continuing what it called Israel's policy "of destruction, killing and collective punishment".

Supranational

- United Nations: Secretary General Kofi Annan released a statement on the day of the attack saying: "The Secretary-General is appalled by today's bomb attack at the Hebrew University in Jerusalem in which seven people were killed and more than 80 wounded. He condemns utterly all such terrorist attacks against civilians. He once again urges all concerned to end the cycle of violence, revenge and retaliation, and calls on the parties to return to the path of negotiations on a permanent settlement."

International

- United States: President George W. Bush condemned the attack, saying to reporters: "I want to condemn in the strongest possible terms the attack that took place in Israel. There are clearly killers who hate the thought of peace, and, therefore, are willing to take their hatred to all kinds of places, including a university. And this country condemns that kind of killing, and we send our deepest sympathy to the students and their families. I also want to make it clear to the killers that it won't stop us from rallying the world to fight their kind of terror; nor will they stop us from having a vision of peace." He added: "I'm just as angry as Israel is right now. I'm furious that innocent life was lost. However through my fury, even though I am mad, I still believe peace is possible."
- China: Foreign Ministry Spokesperson Kong Quan said: "China is shocked by and strongly condemns the expansion of bombing to campuses. Reality tells us that trades of violence can only cause more deaths and injuries to both sides. We call on both Israel and Palestine to cease the attacks of its kind against innocent civilians, making earnest and practical efforts to coordinate the peace-promoting efforts to prevent things from worsening."
- South Africa: The government said it was "deeply saddened by the loss of life and injuries incurred during the terrorist bombing of the cafeteria in the Frank Sinatra Building at the Hebrew University of Jerusalem on Wednesday 31 July. The Deputy Minister of Foreign Affairs, Mr. Pahad reiterates the view that these forms of terrorist attacks directed at Israeli civilians cannot be justified as legitimate acts of resistance, and must be condemned unequivocally."

== Aftermath ==
In the wake of the attack, Israel adopted a deterrence strategy of demolishing houses belonging to suicide bombers. Israel shelved the policy in February 2005. The university beefed up its security following the bombing. In 2005, it became the first Israeli university to employ bomb-sniffing dogs. As of that year, the entrances to the institution were equipped with metal detectors and staffed by approximately two dozen security guards. In addition, legally carried guns were banned from its campuses – the first university in Israel to do so.

In 2022, Palestinian Media Watch reported the terrorists responsible had their monthly stipends raised by the Palestinian Authority's Martyrs Fund program.

== See also ==
- Israeli casualties of war
- Mercaz HaRav massacre
