= 2003 in Israel =

- Decades: 1980s; 1990s; 2000s; 2010s; 2020s
- See also: History of Israel; Timeline of Israeli history; List of years in Israel

Events in the year 2003 in Israel.

== Incumbents ==
- President of Israel – Moshe Katsav
- Prime Minister of Israel – Ariel Sharon (Likud)
- President of the Supreme Court – Aharon Barak
- Chief of General Staff – Moshe Ya'alon
- Government of Israel – 29th Government of Israel until February 28, 30th Government of Israel

== Events ==
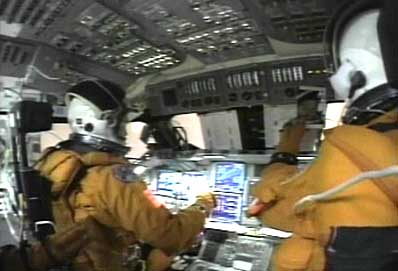
Space Shuttle Columbia disaster: The glow of reentry as seen out the front windows

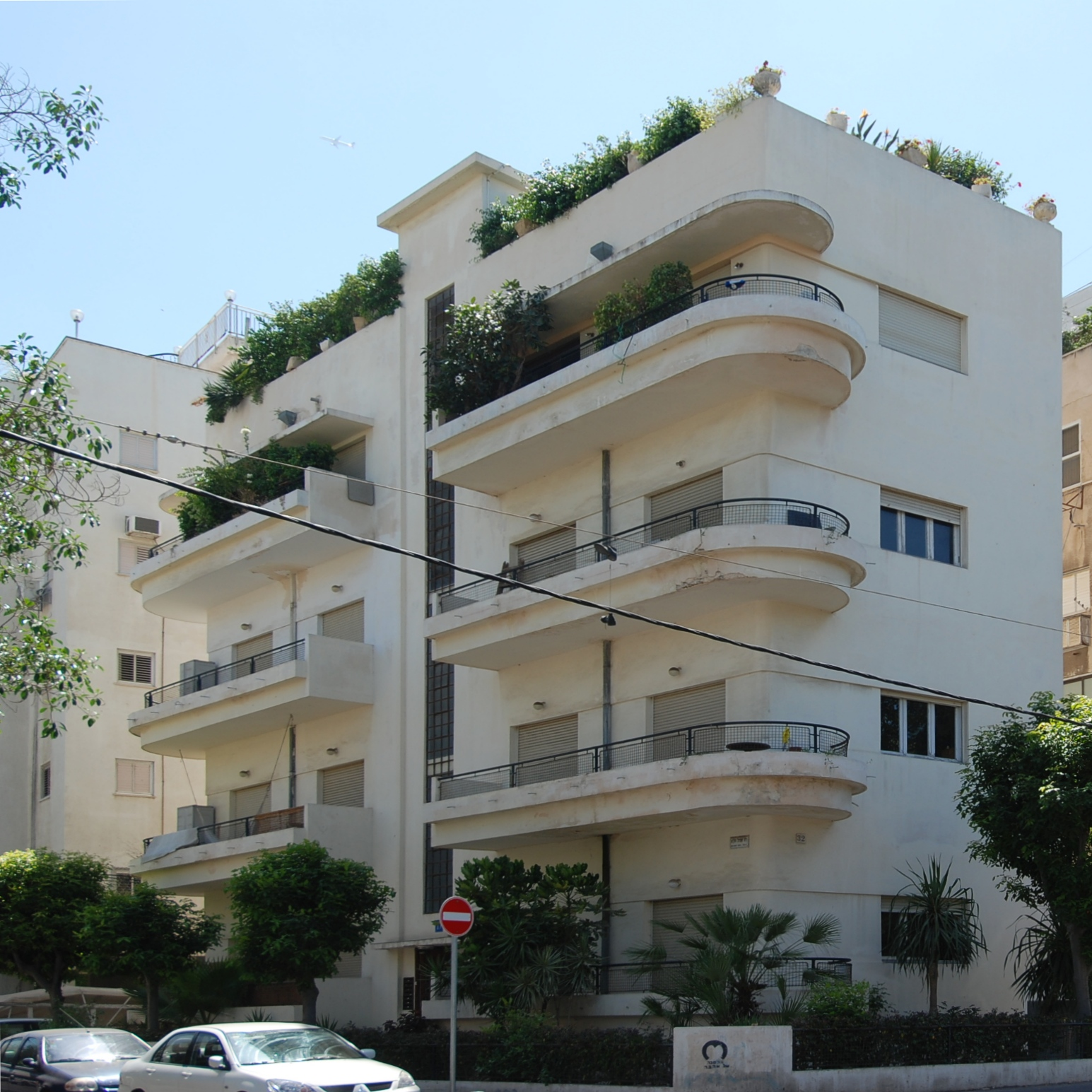
The White City of Tel Aviv is designated by UNESCO as a World Heritage Site

- January 28 – The Elections for the 16th Knesset are held in Israel. The result is a resounding victory for Ariel Sharon's Likud.
- February 1 – At the conclusion of the STS-107 mission, the Space Shuttle Columbia disintegrates during reentry over Texas, killing all seven astronauts on board, including the first Israeli astronaut, Ilan Ramon.
- February 28 – Israeli Prime Minister Sharon presents his cabinet for a Knesset "Vote of Confidence". The 30th Government is approved that day and the members are sworn in.
- 24 May – Lior Narkis represents Israel at the Eurovision Song Contest with the song “Words for Love".
- May 29 – The Indian Ministry of Defence announces its purchase of Phalcon early warning radar systems from Israel. The contract is worth 1.2 billion US dollars.
- July – The White City of Tel Aviv was designated by UNESCO as a World Heritage Site.
- August 8 – The Lebanese militant group Hezbollah fires artillery toward Israeli border posts. It was the first such exchange in eight months.
- August 10 – A 16-year-old Israeli is killed and five people are wounded in Hezbollah shelling of the northern Israeli town of Shlomi. Israeli planes attack Hezbollah targets in Lebanon in response.
- September 2 - Or Commission publishes its report.
- October 5 – The Israeli Air Force attacked an alleged Palestinian militant training camp in Ain es Saheb, Syria.
- October 6 – In his first public comments since the Israeli attack in Syria, US President George W. Bush says that Israel has the right to defend its homeland; at the same time Mr. Bush asks Prime Minister Sharon to avoid any further actions that might destabilize the region.
- December 16 – The Israeli military reveals it developed a secret plan to assassinate Saddam Hussein in retaliation for the Scud missile attacks on Israel during the Gulf War. The plan was called off after five commandos were accidentally killed while training for the mission.

=== Israeli–Palestinian conflict ===
The most prominent events related to the Israeli–Palestinian conflict which occurred during 2003 include:

- March 16 – Rachel Corrie, an American member of the International Solidarity Movement in Rafah, in the Gaza Strip, is killed in a residential area of Rafah by an Israel Defense Forces (IDF) bulldozer while she was kneeling in front of the home of a local Palestinian Arab, acting as a human shield and attempting to prevent IDF forces from demolishing the home. The IDF has claimed that the death was due to the restricted angle of view of the IDF Caterpillar D9 bulldozer driver, while ISM eyewitnesses said "there was nothing to obscure the driver's view."
- March 24 – Hilltop 26, an illegal Israeli settlement near the city of Hebron, is peacefully dismantled by the IDF.
- April 30 – A road map for peace sponsored by the US, UN, EU, and Russia is delivered to the Israeli government and the Palestinian Authority.
- May 25 – Israeli Prime Minister Ariel Sharon wins cabinet approval for a peace plan that includes the creation of a Palestinian Arab state by 2005.
- May 27 – Israeli prime minister Ariel Sharon states that the "occupation" of Palestinian territories is "a terrible thing for Israel and for the Palestinians" and "can't continue endlessly." Sharon's phraseology prompts shock from many in Israel, leading to a clarification that by "occupation," Sharon meant control of millions of Palestinian Arab lives rather than actual physical occupation of land.
- June 3 – Israel frees about 100 Palestinian Arab prisoners before the Mideast peace summit with President George W. Bush in a sign of goodwill.
- June 4 – "Road map" for peace: Israeli Prime Minister Sharon promises to dismantle illegal settlements in the West Bank, while new Palestinian Authority Prime Minister Mahmoud Abbas renounces all terrorism against Israel.
- August 14 – Israel frees another 76 prisoners, a week after releasing more than 300 people. Israel argues that it is a gesture of goodwill and in accordance with agreements. The Palestinian Authority disagrees and says that most were not arrested for terrorist activities, and that it was the people arrested for the latter that Israel originally agreed to release.
- September 7 – Israel's Prime Minister Ariel Sharon declares that Hamas leaders are "marked for death" and will not have a moment's rest, after Israel failed in an attempt to kill the top-ranking members of Hamas with a 550-pound bomb dropped on a Gaza City apartment.
- September 24 – A protest letter by a group of 27 Israeli pilots of the Israeli air force is publicized. In the letter, the pilots announce their refusal to fly further missions to bomb leaders of Palestinian terrorist groups in civilian areas. The pilots' letter calls the attacks "illegal and immoral". It draws quick condemnation from commentators, from politicians and from military leaders, with calls for severe punishment including jail, although a dismissal is considered the most likely result. The pilots' protest is a reaction to attacks like the one on Hamas leader Salah Shehade in July 2002, which killed Shehade, his bodyguard and 15 civilians, among them nine children.
- October 21 – The UN General Assembly approves a resolution demanding that Israel remove a security fence in the West Bank. The resolution passes by an overwhelming majority of 144 to 4 with the US voting against the motion.

==== Palestinian militant operations against Israeli targets ====
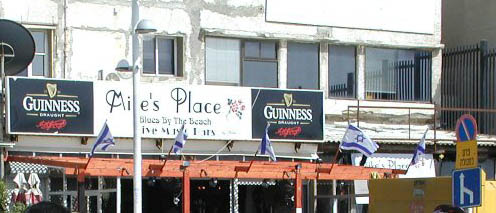
Mike's Place a few days after the April 2003 suicide bombing that killed three and injured 50

The most prominent Palestinian militant acts and operations committed against Israeli targets during 2003 include:

- January 5 – Tel Aviv central bus station massacre: Two Palestinian Arab suicide bombers blow themselves up about two minutes apart at a crowded neighborhood near the Old Tel Aviv Central Bus Station, killing 23 Israelis and wounding 80 others. Both the Islamic Jihad and Hamas claim responsibility for the double bombing.
- January 13 – Tel Aviv suicide bombing
- March 5 – 17 people killed and 53 injured in a Hamas suicide bombing attack on an Egged bus No. 37 in Haifa.
- March 30 – London Cafe bombing
- April 24 – Kfar Sava train station bombing: A 23-year-old Israeli security guard is killed and 13 others are wounded in a suicide bombing outside of the Kfar Saba – Nordau Railway Station. Groups related to the Al-Aqsa Martyrs' Brigades and the PFLP claim joint responsibility for the attack.
- April 30 – Mike's Place bombing: Four Israelis and 50 injured when a Muslim British citizen suicide bomber attacks Tel Aviv restaurant "Mike's Place". Hamas and Al-Aqsa Martyrs' Brigades claim joint responsibility for the attack.
- May 17 – Gross Square attack: An Israeli couple are killed by a Palestinian Arab suicide bomber in Hebron. Hamas claims responsibility for the attack.
- May 18 – 17 killed and 20 injured in a Palestinian suicide bombing attack on a bus in Jerusalem's French Hill district. Hamas claims responsibility for the attack.
- May 19 – Three IDF soldiers are mildly injured in a cyclist Hamas suicide bombing attack on a military jeep near Kfar Darom south of the Gaza Strip with just the bomber killed. Hamas claimed responsibility for the attack.
- May 19 – Three people are killed and about 60 injured in a female suicide bombing attack at the entrance to of the Afula mall in the northern Israeli town of Afula. Islamic Jihad and the Al-Aqsa Martyrs' Brigades both claim responsibility for the attack.
- May 22 – Nine Israelis injured in a roadside bombing attack next to a bus near Netzarim in the Gaza Strip.
- June 11 – Sixteen Israelis killed by a Palestinian suicide bombing attack on a bus in Jerusalem, Israel, who was disguised as an Orthodox Jew.
- June 19 – An Israeli shopkeeper is killed in a Palestinian Arab suicide bombing attack in the moshav of Sdei Trumot. Islamic Jihad claimed responsibility for the attack.
- June 20 – One American Israeli killed and three relatives injured in an attack by waiting Hamas gunmen when driving to a wedding party in Jerusalem.
- July 7 – A 65-year-old Israeli woman killed and her three grandchildren lightly injured in a Palestinian suicide bombing attack inside the women's residential home in Moshav Kfar Yabetz. Islamic Jihad claims responsibility for the attack.
- August 12 – Two Israelis are killed and about a dozen are injured in two separate Palestinian suicide bombing attacks in the towns of Rosh Ha'ayin and Ariel. Hamas and the Al-Aqsa Martyrs' Brigades claim responsibility for the attacks.
- August 12 – A 43-year-old Israeli is killed by a teenage Palestinian suicide bombing attack in a Rosh Ha'ayin supermarket.
- August 19 – 23 Israelis are killed and over 130 are wounded in a Hamas suicide bombing attack, who was disguised as a Haredi Jew and used spiked ball-bearings on an Egged bus No. 2 in Jerusalem.
- September 9 – Eight Israelis killed and 15 injured in a Palestinian suicide bombing at a bus stop near Tzrifin, close to Rishon LeZion, which several hours later, followed by a second suicide bombing at a Jerusalem café, which killed seven people and injured dozens.
- September 9 – Seven people killed and over 50 injured in a Palestinian suicide bombing attack at the Café Hillel in Jerusalem. Hamas claims responsibility.
- September 26 – The Avraham family is killed by a Palestinian gunman forces his way into a home in Negohot, an Israeli settlement in the West Bank near Hebron, and murders seven-month-old Shaked Avraham and 27-year-old Eyal Yeberbaum, and wounds both of the baby girl's parents as they are celebrating the Jewish New Year. The gunman is later killed by Israeli security forces. Islamic Jihad claims responsibility for the attack.
- October 4 – 21 Israelis killed and 51 injured by a 28-year-old Palestinian female suicide bombing attack, with the bomber Hanadi Jaradat attacking the Maxim restaurant in Haifa. The restaurant was co-owned by Christian Arab and Jewish Israelis and was a symbol of co-existence.
- October 9 – Two IDF soldiers and a Palestinian are injured in a Palestinian suicide bombing attack on the DCO located at the entrance to Tulkarm.
- October 15 – Three Americans killed and one wounded in an IED attack at the Beit Hanoun junction in the Gaza Strip of a convoy carrying U.S. diplomats.
- November 3 – One IDF soldier mildly injured in suicide bomber attacks on an Israeli incursion in Azun near Kafr Qasem in the West Bank. The Al-Aqsa Martyrs' Brigade claimed responsibility.
- December 25 – Four Israelis killed in a Palestinian suicide bombing attack at a bus stop near Tel Aviv.

==== Israeli military operations against Palestinian militancy targets ====
The most prominent Israeli military counter-terrorism operations (military campaigns and military operations) carried out against Palestinian militants during 2003 include:

- June 21 – IDF executes Abdullah Qawasmeh, a senior Hamas commander in Hebron believed to be the responsible for the attack on the Goldstein family driving on Route 60 that killed an American-Israeli and injured 3.
- August 21 – Israel executes senior Hamas official, Ismail Abu Shanab, by a missile strike in the Gaza Strip.
- October 5 – Ain es Saheb airstrike: Israeli warplanes attack an alleged Islamic Jihad training base in Syria, 24 kilometres (15 mi) northwest of the Syrian capital Damascus, in response for a suicide bombing at a Haifa restaurant that killed 21 people. The Israel Defense Forces claimed the camp was used to train recruits in bomb assembly and guerrilla warfare and has released footage of the camp taken from the Al-Arabia TV station showing hundreds of weapons and tunnels packed with arms and ammunition.
- December 25 – An Israeli helicopter gunship attacks a car in Gaza City, killing Islamic Jihad commander Mekled Hameid and two fellow militants, together with two bystanders.

== Notable deaths ==
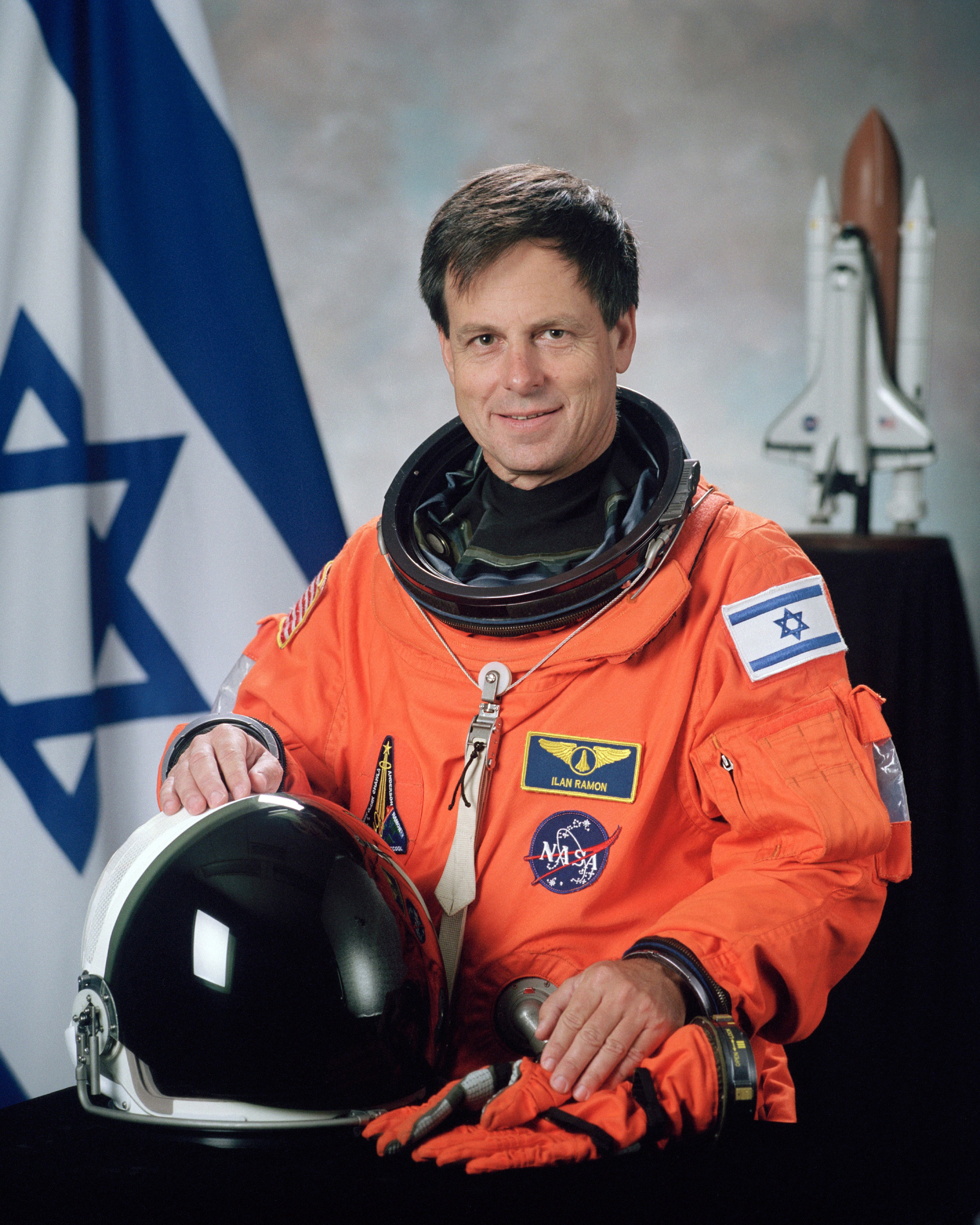
Ilan Ramon

- February 1 – Ilan Ramon (born 1954), Israel's first astronaut.
- February 22 – Shlomo Argov (born 1929), Israeli diplomat.
- June 5 – Meir Vilner (born 1918), Lithuanian-born Israeli politician and Jewish leader who was the last surviving signatory to Israel's declaration of independence and former chairman of the Communist Party of Israel.
- September 3 – Charles S. Liebman (born 1934), American-born Israeli political scientist and author on Jewish life and Israel.
- December 13 – David Perlov (born 1930), Brazilian-born Israeli filmmaker.
- December 31 – Dora Gad (born 1912), Romanian-born Israeli interior designer and architect.

== See also ==
- 2003 in Israeli film
- 2003 in Israeli television
- 2003 in Israeli music
- 2003 in Israeli sport
- Israel in the Eurovision Song Contest 2003
- 2003 in the Palestinian territories
