= Ibrahim Hamed =

Palestinian militant

Ibrahim Hamed (إبراهيم حامد; born 1965 in Silwad) is a Hamas military commander in the West Bank who ordered suicide bombing attacks during the Second Intifada which he claimed is due to Israeli attacks on Palestinians until he was apprehended by Israeli Yamam unit on 23 May 2006. Israeli authorities accused him of being responsible for 96 civilian deaths.

Ibrahim Hamed was serving 45 life sentences in Israeli prison for orchestrating many suicide attacks in Israel that killed dozens of civilians.

It appeared that Hamed was interned under consecutive 6-month administrative detention orders by the Israeli government.

Israel tried Hamed in military court, and on 27 June 2012 he was convicted of killing 46 people.

== Attacks attributed to Ibrahim Hamed ==
- According to Israeli security sources on 1 December 2001, Hamed dispatched two suicide bombers who blew up in Zion Square and Ben Yehuda St. in Jerusalem killing 11 people and injuring dozens.
- On 9 March 2002, a Hamas suicide bomber dispatched by Hamed blew himself up at Café Moment bombing in Jerusalem killing 12 people.
- Six people were killed in a suicide attack planned by Hamed at the Sheffield Club in Rishon LeZion on 7 March that same year.
- Hebrew University massacre: A bomb planted in a cafeteria at the Hebrew University in Jerusalem killed nine students on 31 July 2002.
- Café Hillel bombing: 9 September 2003 in Jerusalem.
- Tzrifin bus stop attack 9 September 2003.
