= David Applebaum =

American-born Israeli physician and rabbi

- דוד אפלבום
- Born: 1952
- Died: 2003 (aged 50–51)
- Occupation: Physician

Academic background
- Education: Medical College of Ohio

Academic work
- Discipline: Emergency medicine
- Institutions: Shaare Zedek Medical Center

David Applebaum (Hebrew: דוד אפלבום; 1952–2003) was an American-born Israeli physician and rabbi. He was chief of the emergency room and trauma services of Jerusalem’s Shaare Zedek Medical Center. Applebaum was murdered in a Palestinian suicide bombing at Cafe Hillel in Jerusalem on September 9, 2003.

== Biography ==
David Applebaum was born in Detroit, Michigan. He attended high school at the Hebrew Theological College in Skokie, Illinois and received his rabbinical ordination from Rabbi Aaron Soloveitchik at the Brisk yeshiva in Chicago. Applebaum was a graduate of Roosevelt University in Chicago, with a master's degree in biological sciences from Northwestern University. He earned his medical degree at the Medical College of Ohio in Toledo, Ohio in 1978. He immigrated to Israel with his family in 1981. In an incident in 1984, Applebaum rushed to aid a man shot in a clothing shop, operating on him while the shooting continued. In 1986, the Israeli Knesset presented Applebaum with the Quality of Life Award for treating terror victims on King George Street in Jerusalem while bullets flew around him.

Applebaum pioneered the idea of immediate care clinics in Israel, to divert non-emergency cases from hospital emergency rooms while delivering faster care to patients who would have had long waits for emergency room staff.

The British Medical Journal noted that Applebaum trained both Arab and Jewish physicians and nurses for his system of urgent care centers so that there would be staffing on the holy days of both religions. He was credited by The Lancet with "transforming" the delivery of emergency care in Israel. Jonathan Halevy, Director General of Jerusalem's Shaare Zedek Medical Center, called Applebaum "a master of emergency medicine." He said that Applebaum had spent the last year upgrading the center’s emergency room procedures, and previously had set up a chain of small emergency care centers called Terem throughout Jerusalem.

== Bombing ==
Applebaum was killed along with his 20-year-old daughter, Nava Applebaum, on the eve of her wedding. Applebaum had just returned from New York, where he addressed a symposium on terrorism marking the second anniversary of the September 11 attacks on the United States. He ended his remarks with: "From one moment to the next, we never know what will happen in the ER [emergency room], but it's in Jerusalem that real reality occurs."

Applebaum's murder was described by The Lancet as a tragic irony: This victim of a suicide bomber was himself an "emergency room doctor who treated victims of dozens of suicide bombings in Israel."

Applebaum’s younger daughter, Shira, earned her paramedic degree from Ben-Gurion University's Health Sciences Faculty and works in emergency medicine.

A year after the bombing, Nael Obeid was sentenced to multiple life sentences for planning the attack. He was released during the January 2025 Gaza war ceasefire and died in a fall about a week later.

== See also ==
- Nava Applebaum
- Health care in Israel
