= List of Israeli films of 2003 =

A list of films produced by the Israeli film industry in 2003.

== 2003 releases ==
| Premiere | | Title | Director | Cast | Genre | Notes | Ref |
|---|---|---|---|---|---|---|---|
| J A N | 2 | Rutenberg (Hebrew: איש החשמל) | Eli Cohen | Menashe Noy, Ayelet Zurer, Lior Ashkenazi | Drama | | |
| M A R | 7 | The Barbecue People (Hebrew: המנגליסטים) | Yossi Madmoni and David Ofek | Raymonde Abecassis, Yigal Adika | Drama | | |
| A P R | 1 | Aviv (Hebrew: אביב) | Tomer Heymann | Aviv Geffen | Documentary | | |
| A P R | 3 | Bonjour Monsieur Shlomi (Hebrew: הכוכבים של שלומי) | Shemi Zarhin | Oshri Cohen | Drama, Comedy | | |
| M A Y | 19 | James' Journey to Jerusalem (Hebrew: מסעות ג'יימס בארץ הקודש) | Ra'anan Alexandrowicz | Siyabonga Melongisi Shibe, Salim Dau | Comedy, Drama | | |
| J U L | 3 | To Be a Star (Hebrew: להיות כוכב) | Arnon Zadok | Alona Tal, Arnon Zadok, Oshri Cohen, Chaim Elmakias | Comedy, Drama, Musical | | |
| J U L | 17 | Sima Vaknin, a Witch (Hebrew: סימה וקנין מכשפה) | Dror Shaul | Tikva Dayan, Lior Ashkenazi, Ami Smolartchik | Comedy, Fantasy | | |
| A U G | 30 | Life Is Life (Hebrew: חיים זה חיים) | Michal Bat-Adam | Yael Abecassis, Moshe Ivgy | Drama | | |
| S E P | 7 | Alila (Hebrew: עלילה) | Amos Gitai | Yael Abecassis, Hanna Laslo, Uri Klauzner, Ronit Elkabetz | Comedy, Drama | Israeli-French co-production | |
| S E P | 18 | Nina's Tragedies (Hebrew: האסונות של נינה) | Savi Gavison | Ayelet Zurer, Yoram Hattab, Alon Aboutboul | Comedy, Drama | | |
| O C T | 9 | Tza'ad Katan (Hebrew: צעד קטן) | Shahar Segal | Avi Nesher, Chelli Goldenberg | Drama | | |
| O C T | 12 | Afarsek (Hebrew: אפרסק) | David Noy | Orna Banai, Uri Klauzner | Drama | | |
| N O V | 5 | Arutz 2: Achshav HaSeret (Hebrew: ערוץ 2: עכשיו הסרט) | Yuval Natan | | Documentary | Made-for-TV film | |
| D E C | 18 | A Gift from Above (Hebrew: מתנה משמיים) | Dover Koshashvili | Yuval Segal, Rami Heuberger, Moni Moshonov | Drama | Israeli-French co-production | |

=== Unknown premiere date ===
| Premiere | Title | Director | Cast | Genre | Notes | Ref |
|---|---|---|---|---|---|---|
| ? | Arna's Children (Hebrew: הילדים של ארנה) | | | | | |
| ? | Big Tuna (Hebrew: זהירות מצלמה) | Shaul Betser | Zadok Safir | Mockumentary | Made-for-TV film | |
| ? | Channels of Rage (Hebrew: ערוצים של זעם) | Anat Halachmi | Subliminal and Tamer Nafar | Documentary | Made-for-TV film | |

== Awards ==
| === Ophir Award === | === Wolgin Award === |

== Notable deaths ==
- December 13 – David Perlov, Israeli filmmaker. (b. 1930)

== See also ==
- 2003 in Israel
