= Afula =

Afula עפולה
- City
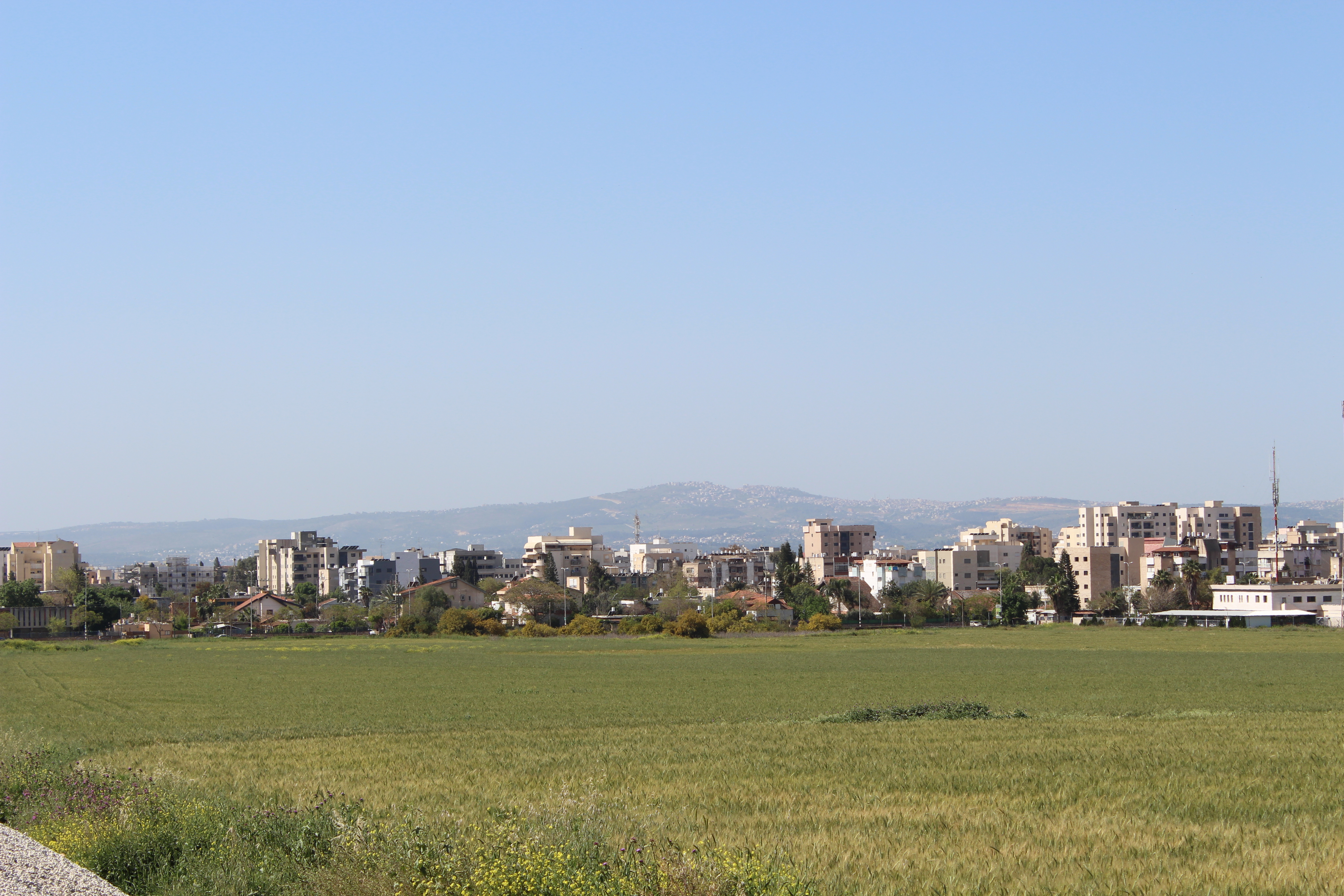
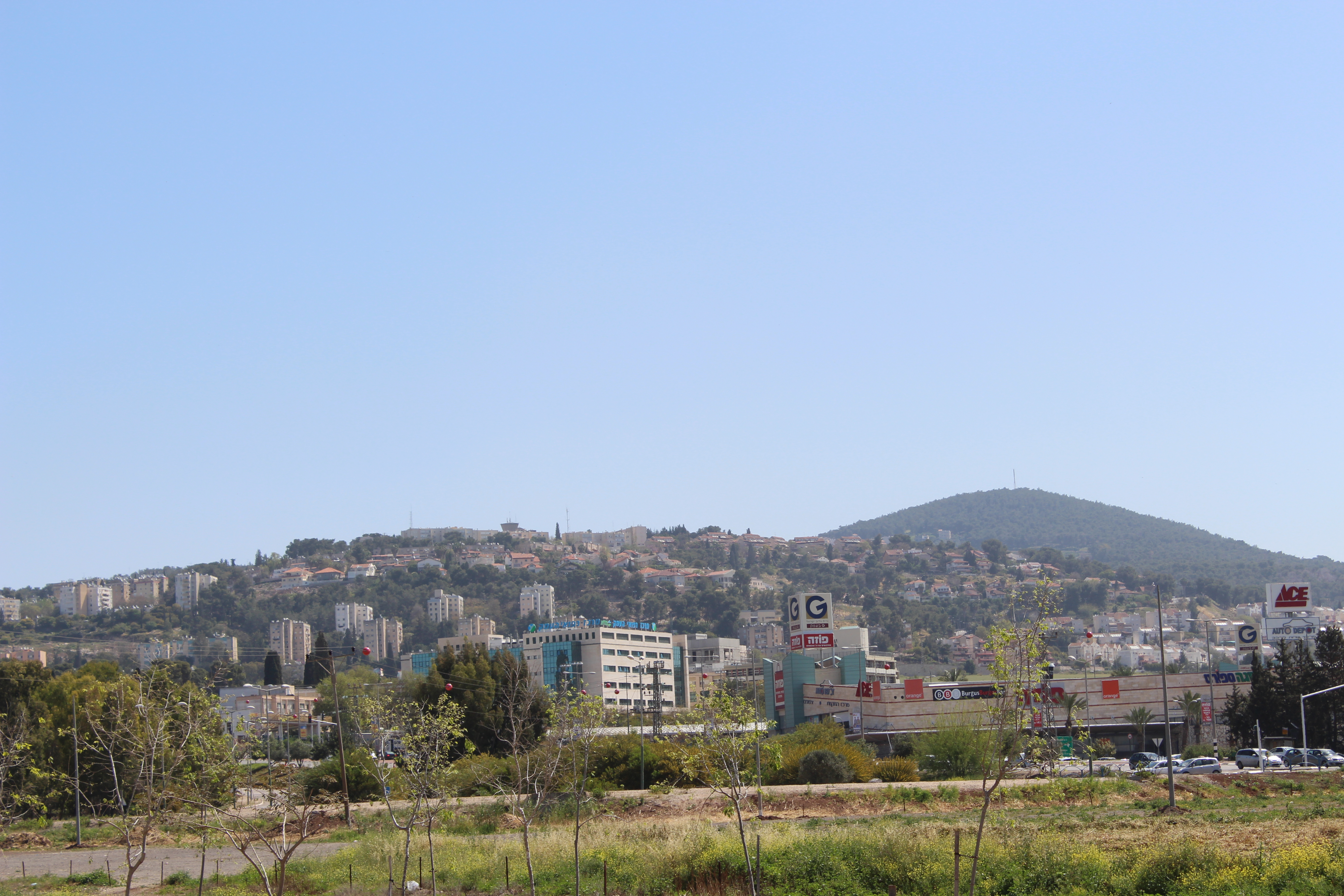
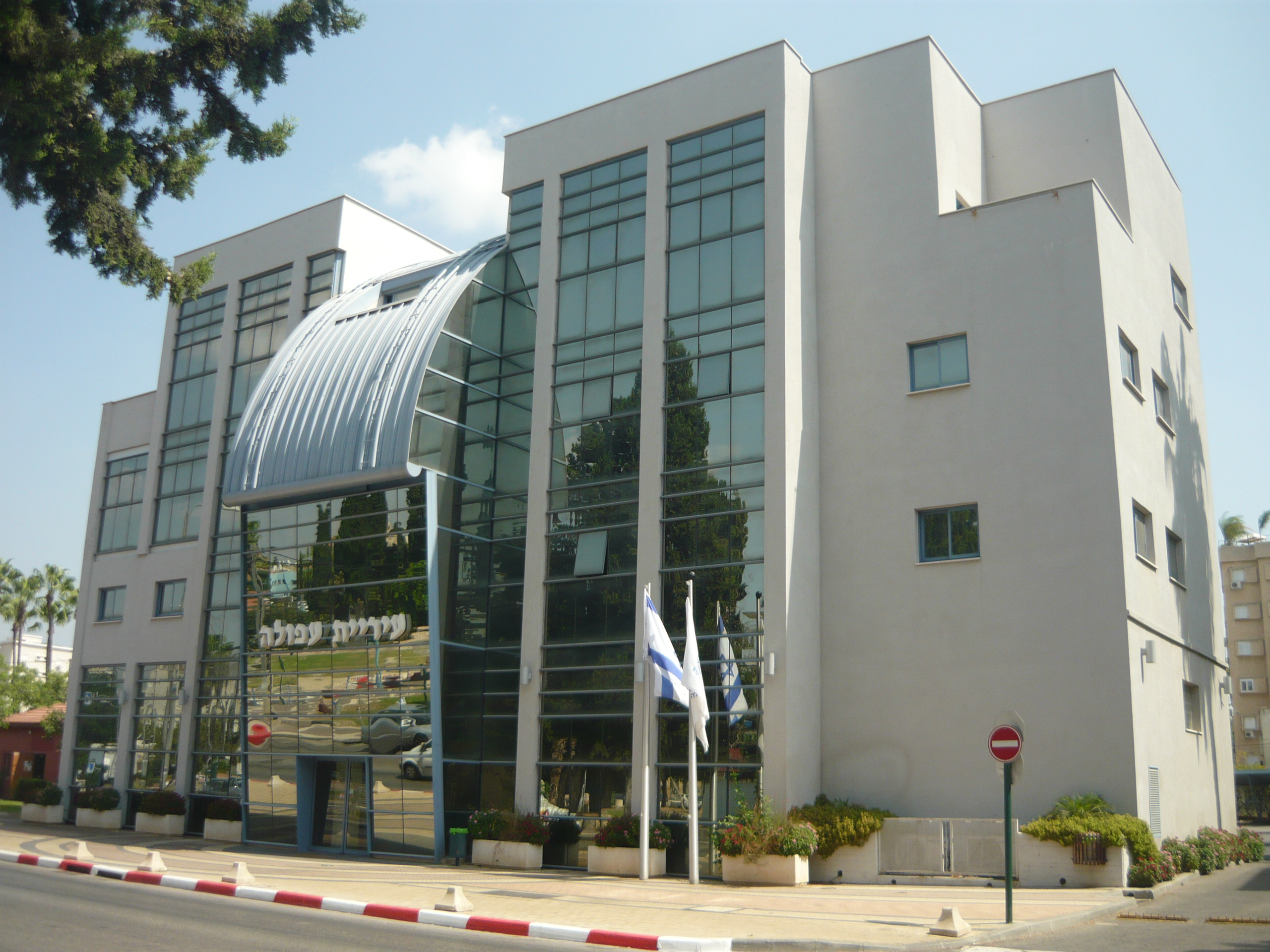
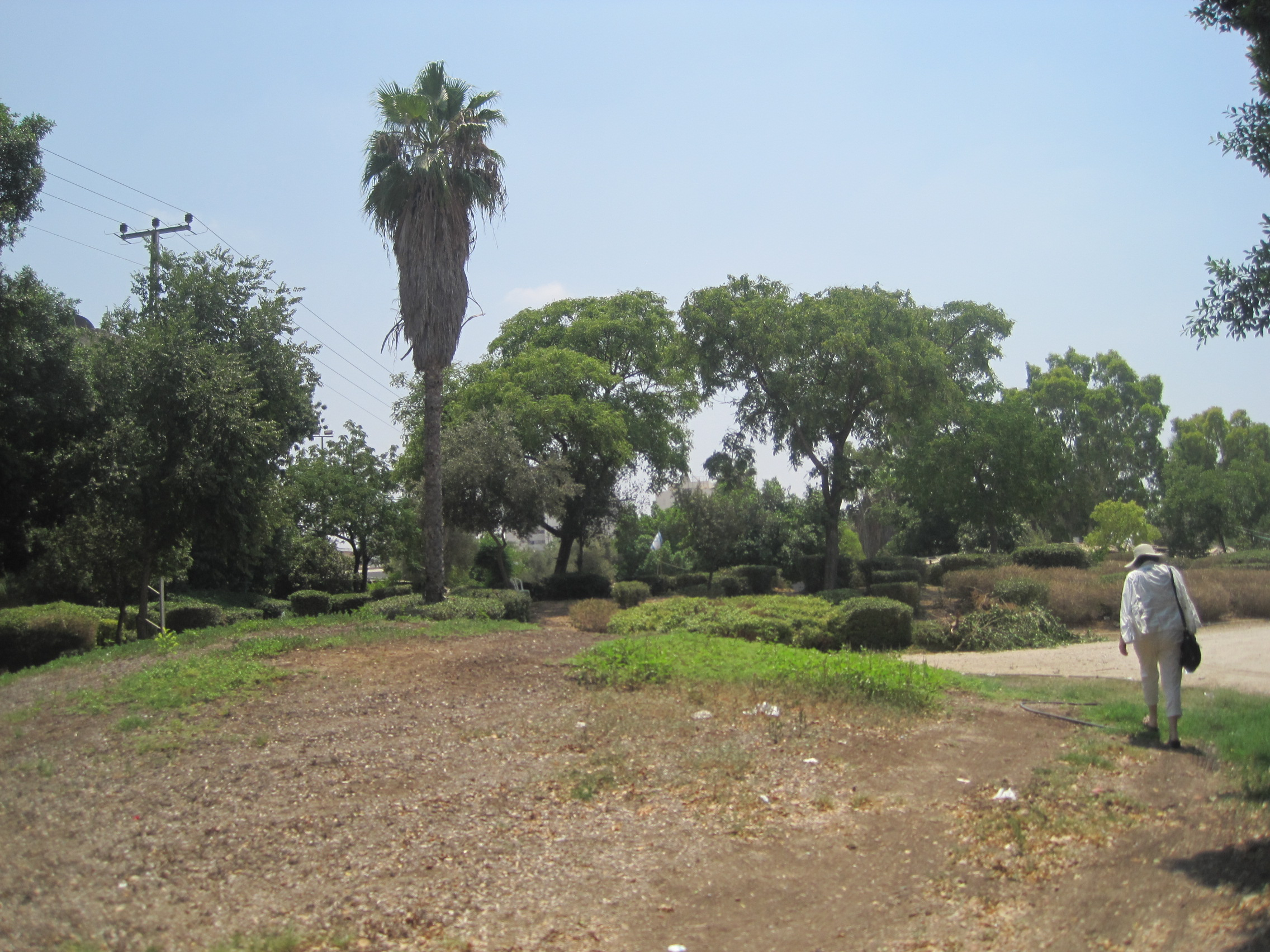
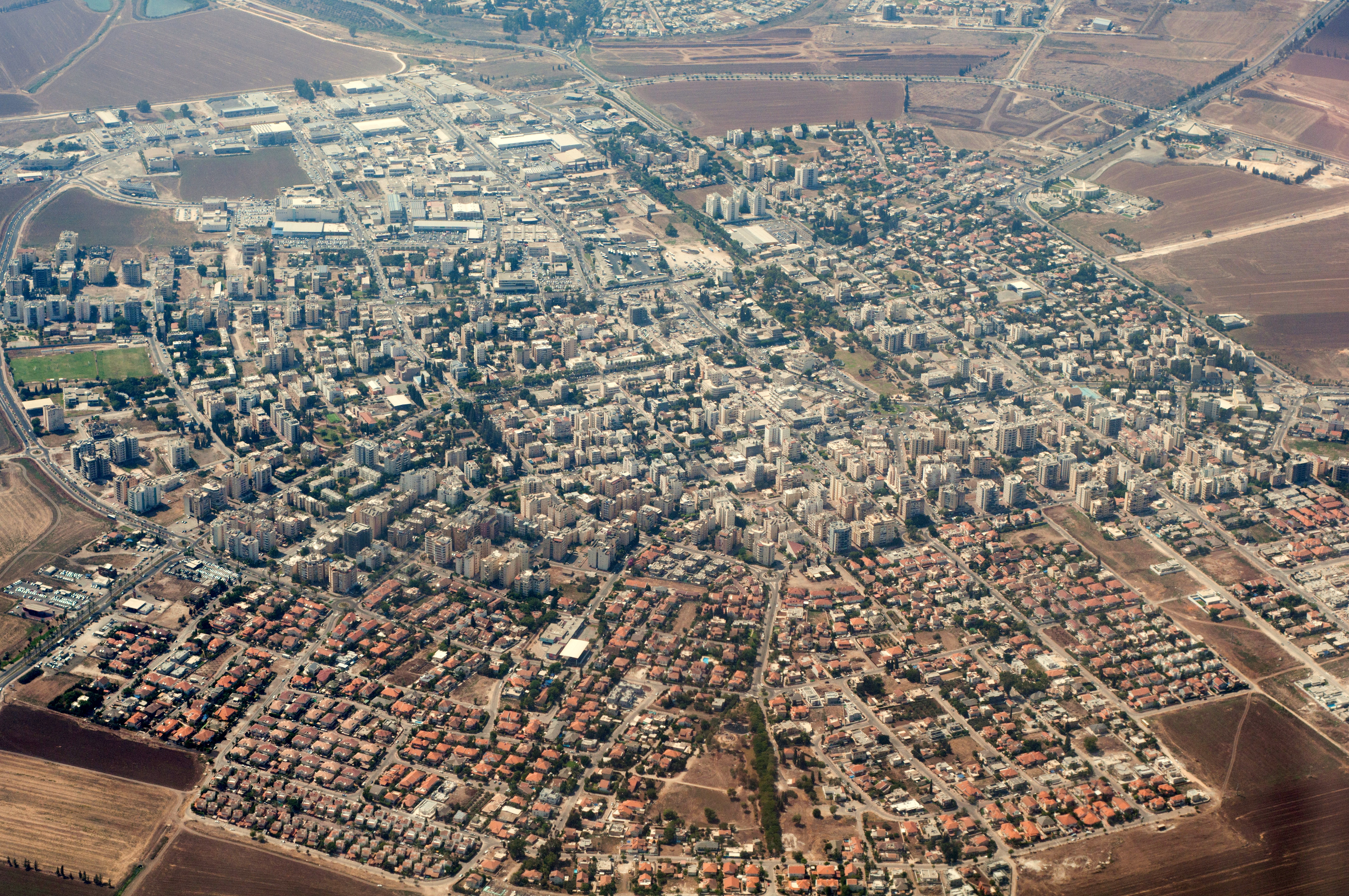

- Coat of arms

- Location within Jezreel Valley region of Israel Location within Israel
- Coordinates: 32°36′23″N 35°17′17″E
- Grid position: 177/224 PAL
- Country: Israel
- District: Northern
- Subdistrict: Jezreel
- Natural Region: Yizre'el Valley
- Founded: 1900 BCE (Canaanite settlement); 7th century (Samaritan town); 14th century (Arab village); 1925–present (Jewish village/city)

Government
  - Mayor: Avi Elkabetz

Area
  - Total: 26,909 dunams (26.909 km^{2}; 10.390 sq mi)

Population (2024)
  - Total: 64,452
  - Density: 2,395.2/km^{2} (6,203.5/sq mi)

Ethnicity
  - Jews and others: 98.9%
  - Arabs: 1.1%

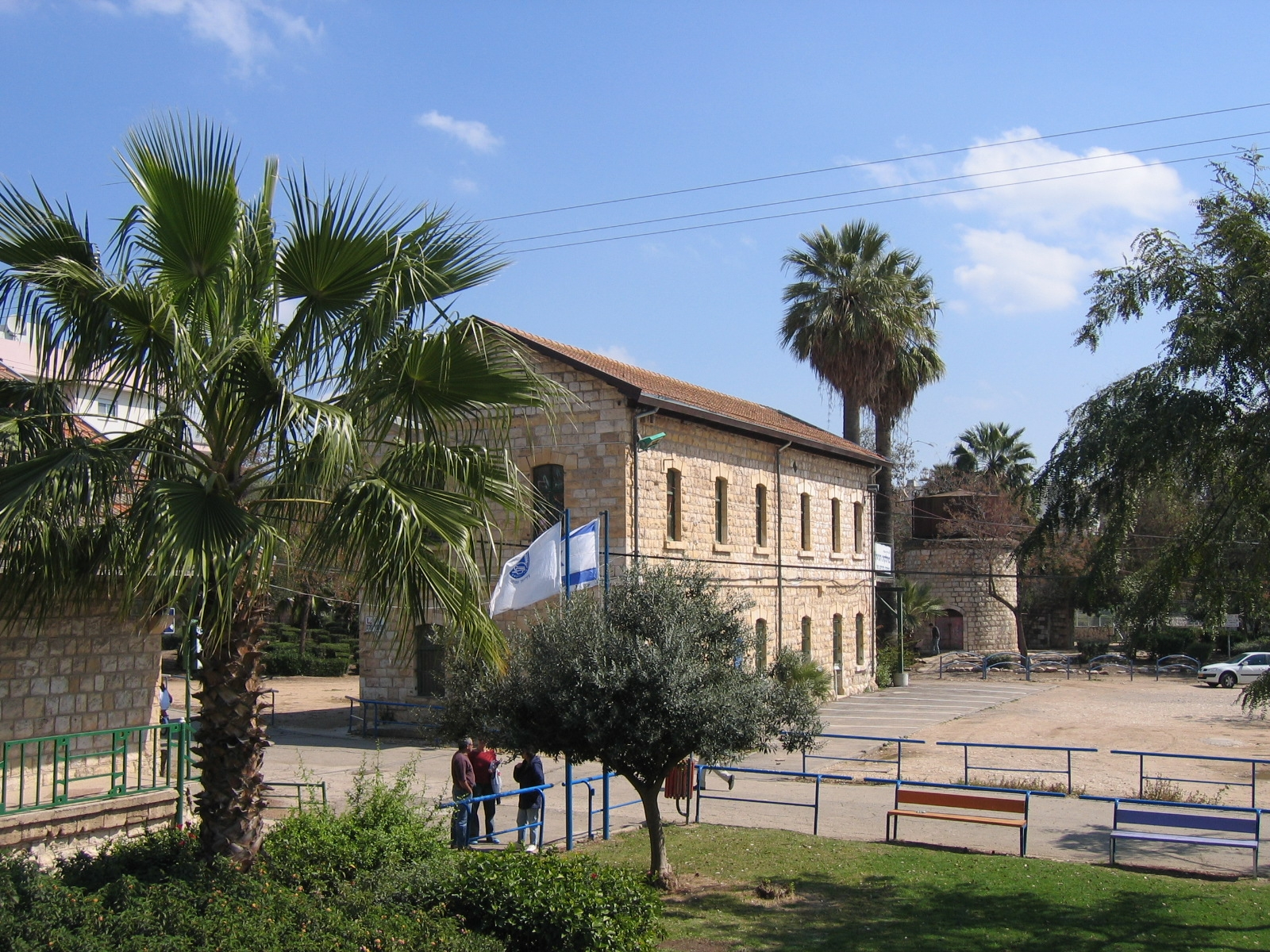
The historic train station of Afula in 2006

Afula (Hebrew: עפולה) is a city in the Northern District of Israel, often known as the "Capital of the Valley" due to its strategic location in the Jezreel Valley. In 2024 the city had a population of 64,452.

== Etymology ==
The name follows that of the small Arab village which occupied the site until the First World War, possibly originating in the Canaanite-Hebrew root ʿofel "fortress tower", or the Arab word for "ruptured".

It was once widely considered to be the biblical site of Ophrah, the hometown of the judge Gideon, but contemporary scholars generally disagree with this supposition.

== History ==
Afula's ancient tell (settlement mound) suggests habitation from the Late Chalcolithic to the Ayyubid period. A fortress was built at the site during the Crusader or Mamluk period.

The ancient mound of ʿAfula, known as Tel ʿAfula, is close to the city center, west of Route 60 and south of Ussishkin Street. Very little of the initial six-acre tell remains due to construction work done in this area since the British Mandate period. The southern peak of the mound is the better preserved part.. Archaeological finds date from the Chalcolithic through the Byzantine period, followed by remains from the Crusader and Mamluk periods.

=== Bronze Age to Byzantine period ===
ʿAfula is possibly the place of Bronze Age ʿOphlah, mentioned in the lists of Pharaoh Thutmose III. Zev Vilnay suggested to identify Afula with biblical (Iron Age II) Ophel, mentioned in 2 Kings. After the destruction of the Kingdom of Israel, the area continued to be inhabited and excavations have revealed artifacts from the periods of Persian and Roman rule.

The first excavations at Tel ʿAfula, carried out in 1948, found Late Chalcolithic– Early Bronze Age remains. Tombs from the Early Bronze Age, Middle Bronze Age II, Late Bronze Age– Iron Age I and Roman period were discovered near the municipal water tower. Archaeologists discovered the Crusader-Mamluk fortress on the southern peak of the tell, a Byzantine olive oil press and evidence of an Early Bronze Age settlement near the northern peak.

In 1950–1951, excavations on the northwestern slope of the peak revealed a pottery workshop for Tell el-Yahudiyeh Ware from Middle Bronze Age II and another pottery workshop from Middle Bronze Age I.

From the 1990s, several small excavations unearthed a sequence of settlement remains from the Chalcolithic until the Late Byzantine periods as well as remains from the Mamluk period.

In 2012, Israel Antiquities Authority excavated on the southern peak of Tel ʿAfula where the Crusader-Mamluk fortress is located. Due to construction activity from the 1950s, settlement layers on the tell have been destroyed. Only meager remnants were found, indicative of a settlement from Early Bronze Age I and the Roman period. Pottery from Early Bronze Age III, Iron Age I and a single Hellenistic Attic fragment indicate settlement on the tell in these periods. Fragments of glazed bowls from the 13th century (Mamluk period) were found along the southern edge of the excavation.

=== Crusader/Ayyubid and Mamluk periods ===
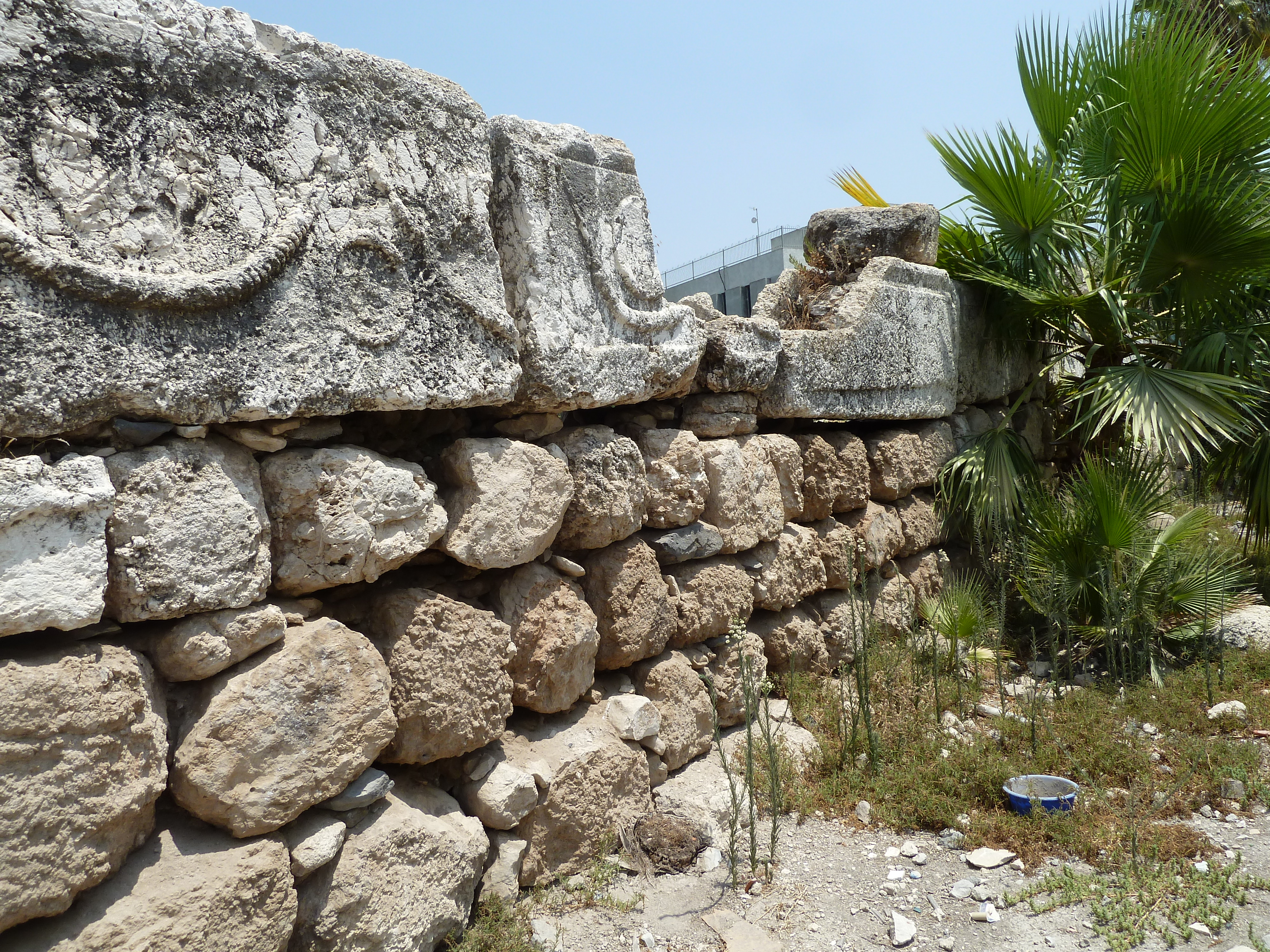
Remains of Crusader fortress in Afula. Note the spolia: Roman sarcophagi as the top layer.

At the centre of Tel ʿAfula stand the remains of a 19-metre square fortress from the Mamluk period, possibly first built during the Crusader period. The lower four courses are made of rough boulders, while the top remaining layer is made of reused Roman sarcophagi. The wall is a total of 5.5 meters tall. Pottery remains indicate that it was occupied in the 12th and 13th century. The gate is dated based on pottery findings to the Mamluk period (13th–14th centuries CE), but as of the end of the 2017 excavation campaign it could not be determined when fortress itself was built, since it is perfectly possible that just the gate was renovated in the Mamluk period; the square shape and the use of Roman sarcophagi as building stones is closely resembling the Crusader tower at Sepphoris.

In 1321, ʿAfula was mentioned under the name of Afel by Marino Sanuto the Elder.

=== Late Ottoman period ===
A map by Pierre Jacotin from Napoleon's invasion of 1799 showed this place, named as Afouleh in a French transliteration of the Arabic.

In 1816, James Silk Buckingham passed by and described Affouli as being built on rising ground and containing only a few dwellings. He noted several other nearby settlements in sight, all populated by Muslims.

In 1838, Edward Robinson described both ʿAfula and the adjacent El Fuleh as "deserted". William McClure Thomson, in a book published in 1859, noted that ʿAfula and the adjacent El Fuleh were "both now deserted, though both were inhabited twenty-five years ago when I first passed this way." Thomson blamed their desertion on the Bedouin.

In 1875, Victor Guérin described ʿAfula as a village on a small hill overlooking a little plain. The houses were built of adobe and various other materials. Around the well, which Guérin thought was probably ancient, he noticed several broken sarcophagi serving as troughs. In 1882, the Palestine Exploration Fund's Survey of Western Palestine described El ʿAfula as a small adobe village in the plain, supplied by two wells.

A population list from about 1887 showed that el ʿAfula had about 630 inhabitants, all Muslim. Gottlieb Schumacher, as part of surveying for the construction of the Jezreel Valley railway, noted in 1900 that it consisted of 50-55 huts and had 200 inhabitants. North of the village was a grain stop, belonging to the Sursocks.

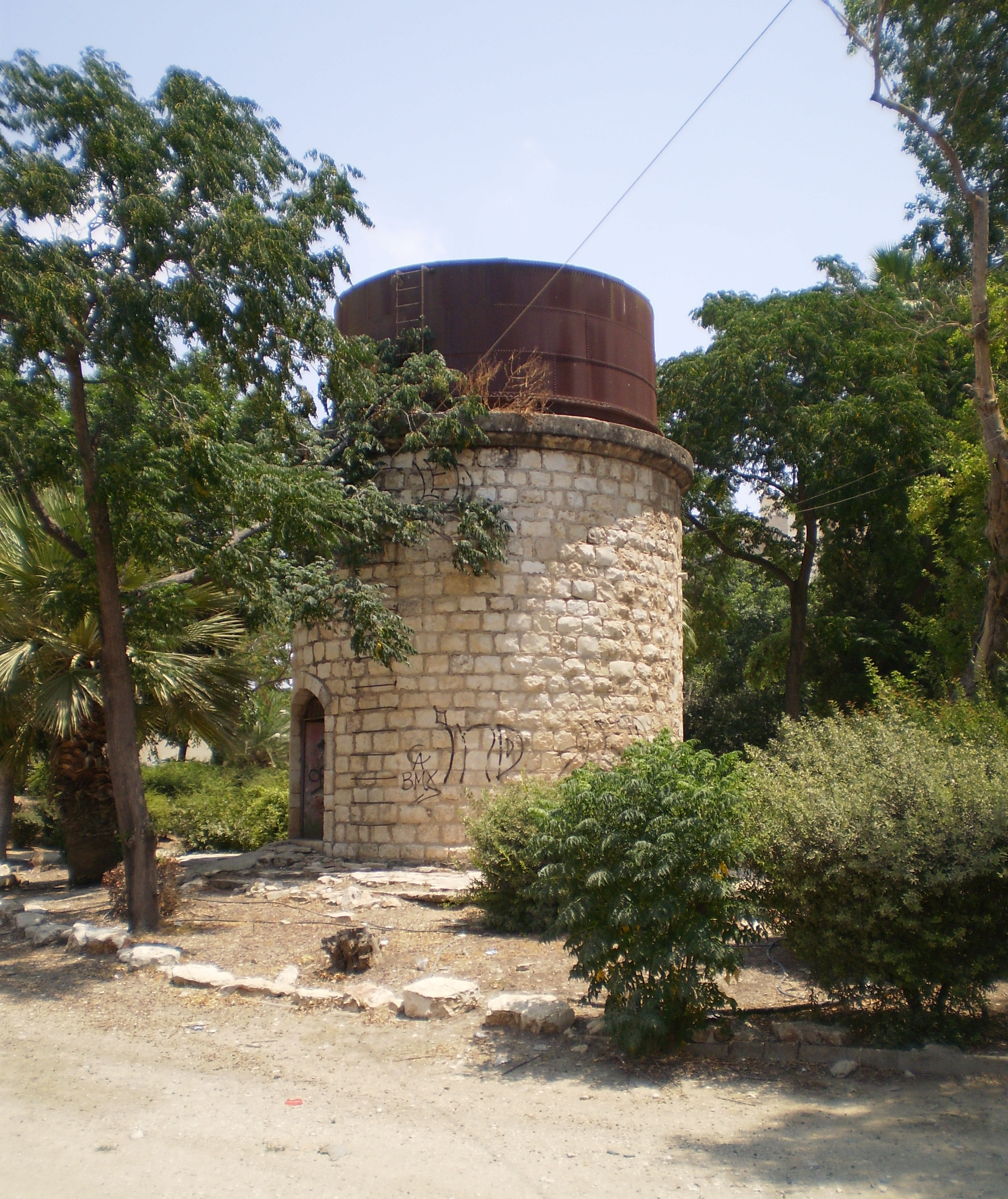
Old water tower at Afula station

In 1904, the Ottoman authorities inaugurated the Jezreel Valley railway, at first operating between Haifa and Beysan via ʿAfula and soon extended to Dera'a. Work eventually continued with an extension towards Jerusalem, the connection to Jenin being completed in 1913.

==== First World War ====
During the Great War, ʿAfulah was a major communications hub. In 1917, when Colonel Richard Meinertzhagen from the British intelligence established contact with the Nili Jewish spy network in Palestine, a German Jewish doctor stationed at al ʿAfulah railway junction provided the British with valuable reconnaissance reports on Ottoman and German troop movements southwards.

With the advance of General Edmund Allenby's British forces into Ottoman Palestine, al ʿAfulah was captured by the 4th Cavalry Division of the Desert Mounted Corps, during the cavalry phase of the Battle of Sharon in September 1918.

=== British Mandate ===
According to the British Mandate's 1922 census of Palestine, Affuleh had 563 inhabitants; 471 Muslims, 62 Christians, 28 Jews and 2 followers of the Baháʼí Faith; 61 of the Christians were Orthodox, while one was Melkite.

==== Jewish Afula (est. 1925) ====
In 1925, the area was acquired with money from the American Zion Commonwealth as part of the Sursock Purchase. The Arab tenant farmers were given four years during which they could either buy the land or leave, in the meantime having the right to cultivate it. A quarter of the one hundred Arab families who had lived in the area accepted compensation for their land and left voluntarily; the remainder were evicted by the new owners. Jews began settling in Afula shortly after as the town developed, with many American and Polish Jews purchasing the parcels. Many of the Polish Jews who bought land in the town perished in the Holocoaust, and were therefore unable to develop their plots. Nearby land had been purchased in a similar manner in 1909 or 1910, when Yehoshua Hankin, in his first major purchase in the Jezreel Valley, bought 10,000 dunams (10 km^{2}) of land on which Merhavia and Tel Adashim were to be built.

In 1924 former leaders of Hashomer established an arms factory in Afula. Disguised as a farm equipment repair workshop, it produced bullets and weapon parts.

By the 1931 census, the population had increased to 874; with 786 Jews, 86 Muslims, nine Christians, and three classified as "no religion", in a total of 236 houses.

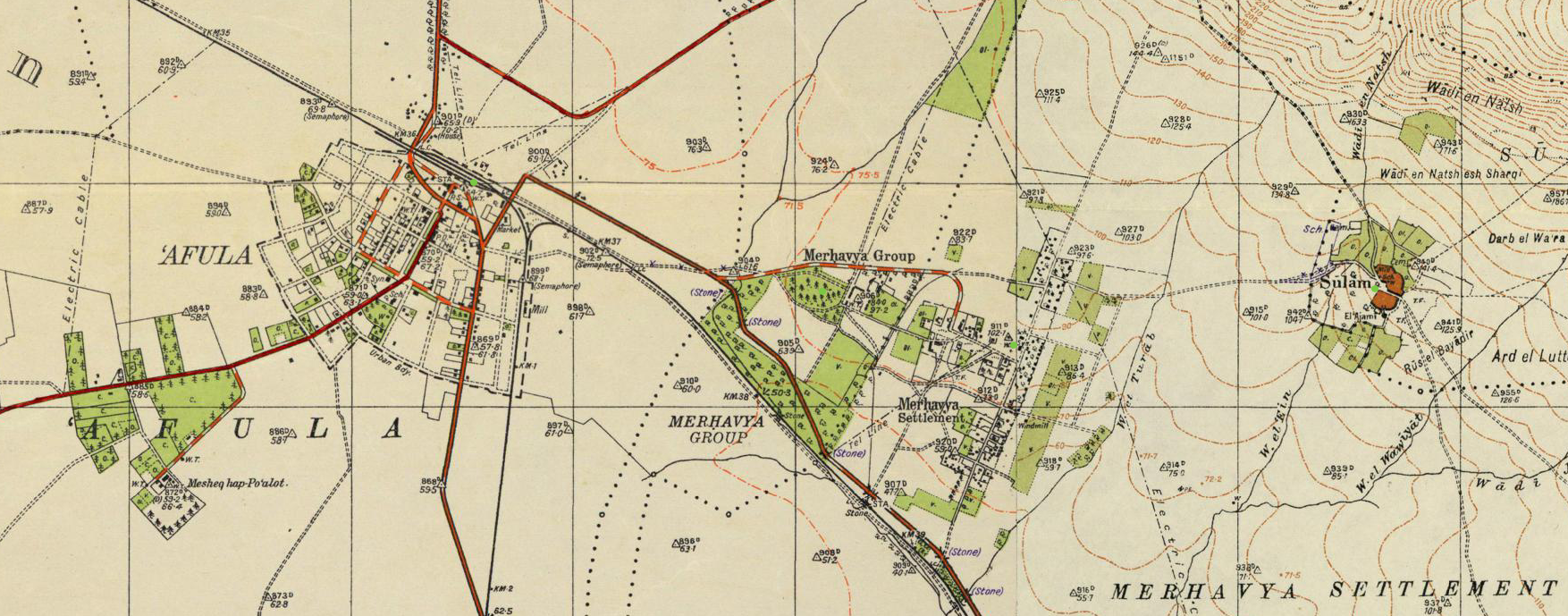
1940s Survey of Palestine map of ʿAfula and Merhavya

In a 1945 survey, the population of ʿAfula was estimated at 2300 Jews and ten Muslims. The town had a total of 18,277 dunams of land, according to an official land and population survey. Of this, 145 dunams of land was used to cultivate citrus and bananas, 347 dunams were for plantations and irrigable land, 15,103 for cereals, while 992 dunams were built-up land.

During this time, the community was served by the Jezreel Valley Railway, a side branch of the larger Hejaz Railway. Since 1913 it had also been the terminus station of the branch connecting it to Jenin and later also to Nablus. Sabotage actions of Jewish underground militias in 1945, 1946 and shortly before the 1948 Arab–Israeli War rendered first the connection to Jenin, then progressively the entire Valley Railway, inoperable.

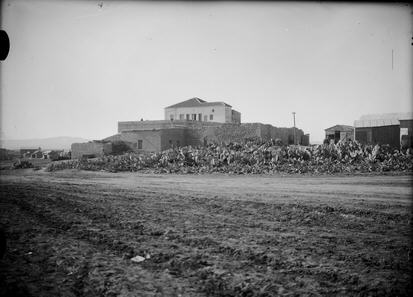
Afula, Beit HaSheikh ("House of the Sheikh") 1925

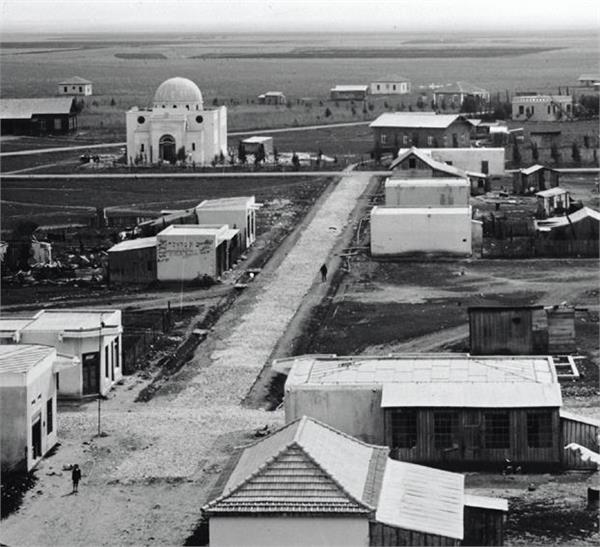
Afula 1928

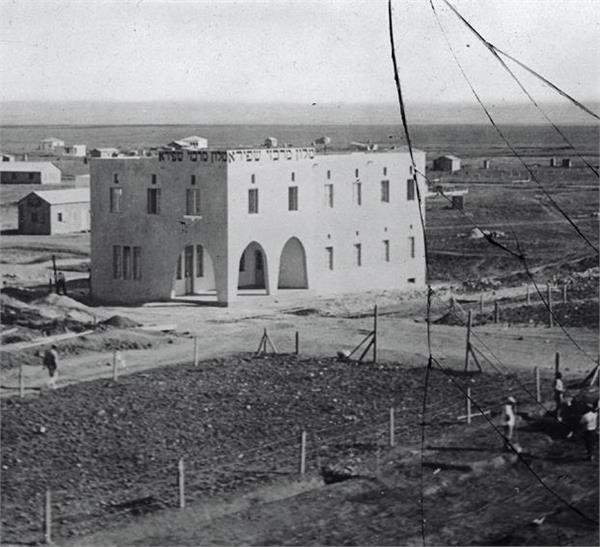
Afula, Shapira Hotel 1928

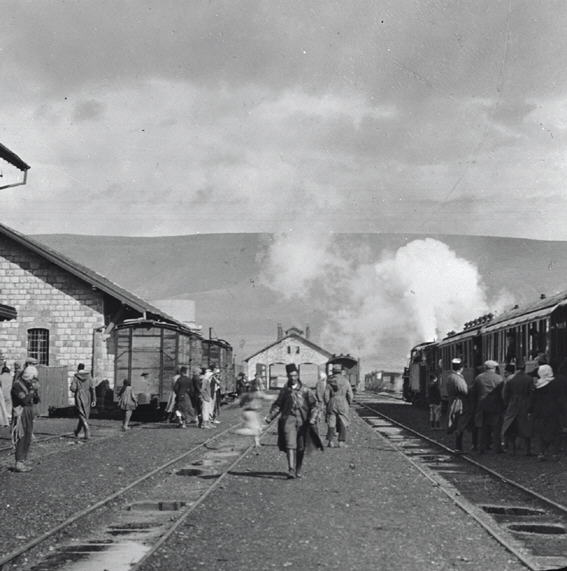
Afula railway station 1930

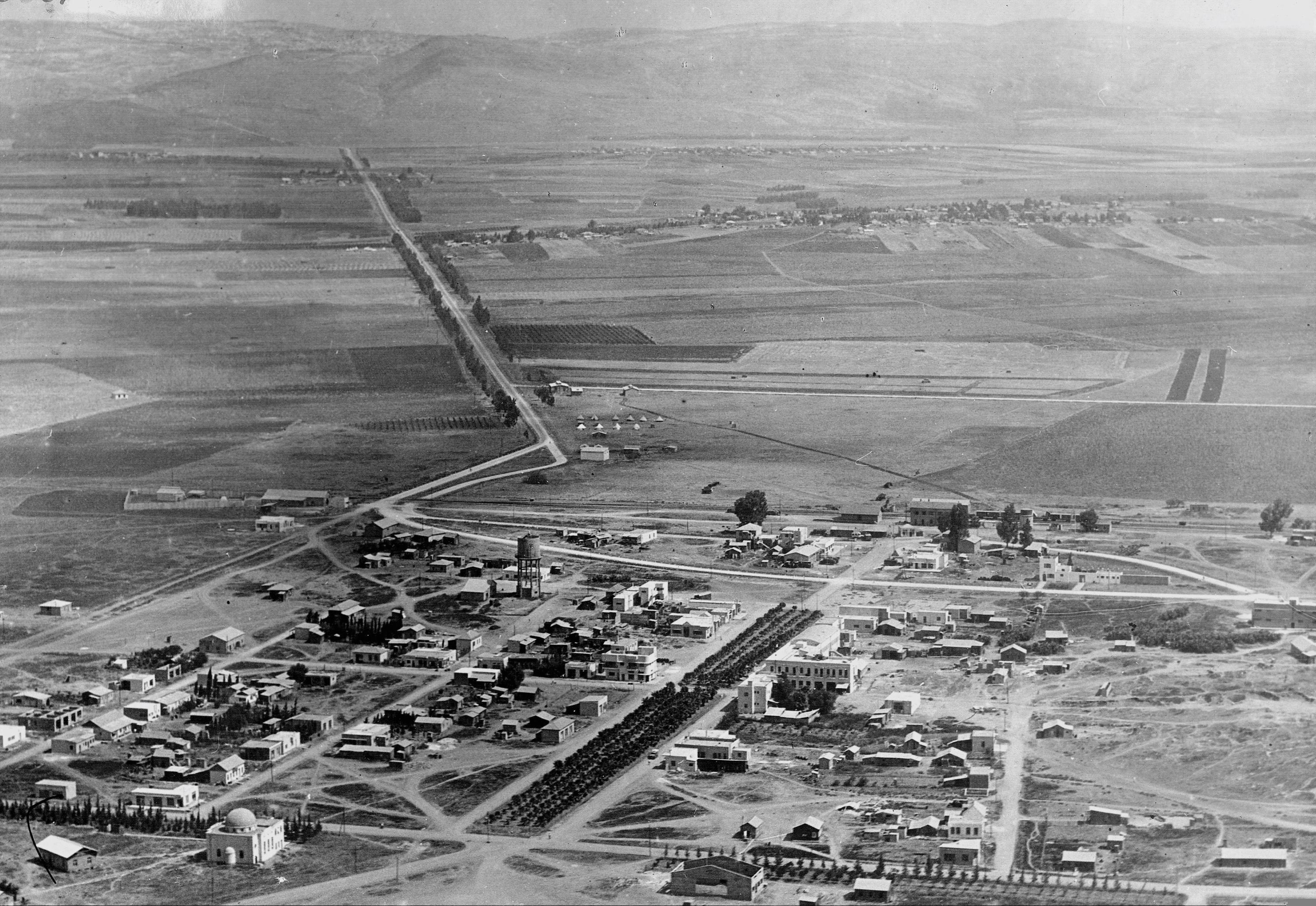
Afula 1937

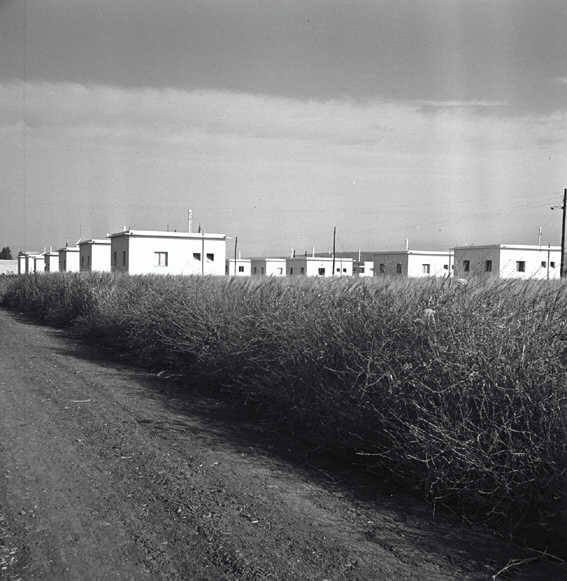
Workers housing, Afula 1946

=== State of Israel ===
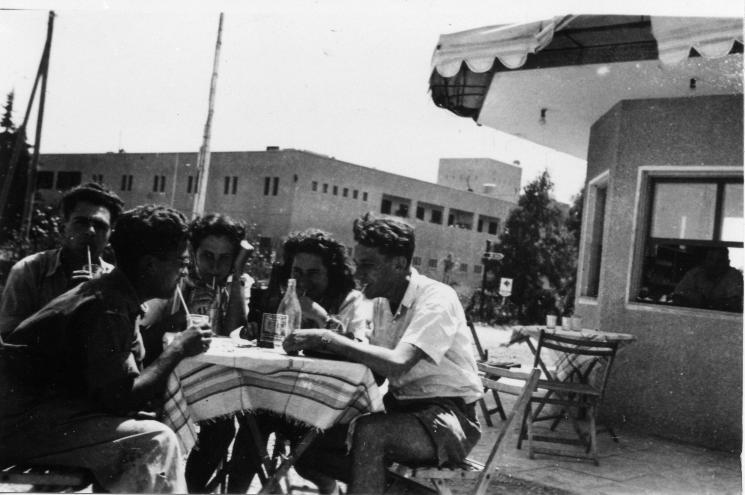
Members of Yiftach Brigade from Beisan on leave in Afula in 1948

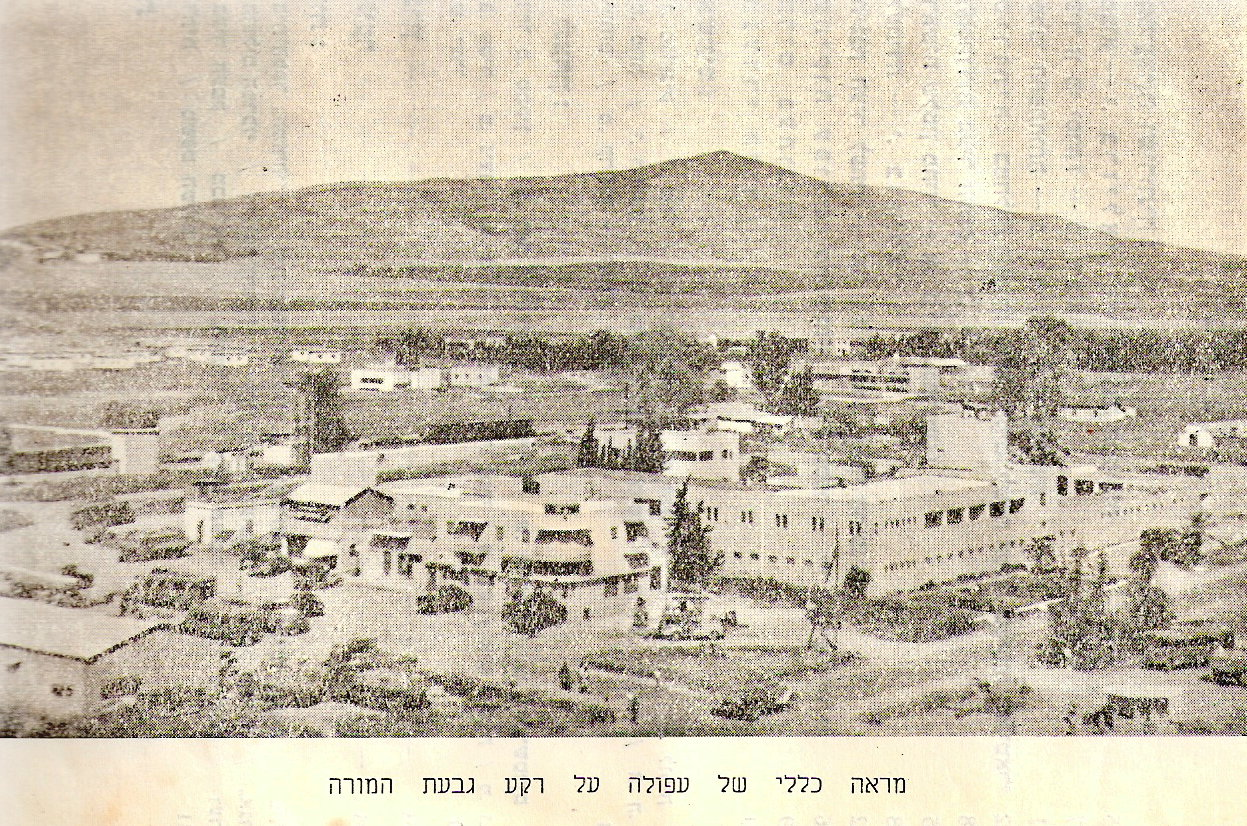
Afula c. 1950

==== Railroad (1948-49; 2010s) ====
Repairs to the Jezreel Valley Railway after 1948 restored service to Haifa, but only until 1949 when it was abandoned. In 2011, construction began on a large-scale project to build a new standard gauge railway from Haifa to Beit She'an with stations in Afula and other towns, along roughly the same route as the historical valley railway. Israel Railways began passenger service on the new line on October 16, 2016.

==== Terror attacks (1990s-2000s) ====
Due to Afula's proximity to the West Bank, it has been a target for Palestinian political violence. On 6 April 1994, the Afula Bus suicide bombing killed five people in the center of Afula. In the Afula axe attack in November 1994, a 19-year-old female soldier was attacked and murdered by an axe-wielding Arab Hamas member.

During the Second Intifada, Afula was the target of a suicide attack on a bus on 5 March 2002, in which one person died and several others were injured at Afula's central bus station. In the Afula mall bombing on 19 May 2003, a female suicide bomber blew herself up at the Amakim mall, killing three and wounding 70. This attack was claimed by the Islamic Jihad Movement in Palestine and the Fatah movement's Al-Aqsa Martyrs Brigades.

==== 2006 Lebanon War ====
On 17 July 2006, during the 2006 Lebanon War, Hezbollah fired Katyusha rockets at Afula, one of the southernmost rocket attacks on Israel from Lebanon. Six people were treated for shock as a result of the attack. On 28 July, a rocket landed causing a fire. The rocket carried 100 kilograms (220 pounds) of explosives.

==== Recent development plans ====
In September 2016, it was announced that seven new neighborhoods would be built, doubling the city's population.

===== "Afula as a Jewish-only city" grassroots campaigns =====
In 2015, a tender of the Israel Land Authority for 27 lots in Afula was won by 45 Arab Palestinian citizens. Following the results, a group of Jewish residents petitioned to cancel the tender, formally citing price coordination but also admitting that the arrival of "a large group of Arab citizens coming to live here together" raised sensitivities in the neighborhood.

In another case in 2018, a Jewish homeowner in Afula refused to rent an apartment to an Arab woman. The Nazareth District Court ruled that the refusal constituted unlawful discrimination on national grounds and ordered him to pay 30,000 NIS in damages, noting that despite the landlord’s claim that he held no racist views, his actions demonstrated anti-Arab bias. Reports in the Israeli press have highlighted the persistence of anti-Arab sentiment in the city. Former Afula Mayor Avi Elkabetz joined the protest and said, "the residents of Afula don't want a mixed city, but rather a Jewish city, and it's their right. This is not racism."

The land tender sparked protests by local Jewish residents who declared their opposition to Arabs settling in the city. Demonstrators warned that the influx of Arab families would turn the neighborhood into "a village… soon there will be a mosque and a school… where have we come to?" and claimed this would drive Jews to leave Afula. Civil society groups condemned the protests as discriminatory and urged the municipality to respect equal rights for all citizens. On 13 June 2018, a demonstration was held in Afula against the sale of an apartment to Arabs, joined not only by residents but also by the city’s deputy mayor. In response, the Anti-Defamation League (ADL) sent a letter to the mayor of Afula expressing strong opposition to institutional discrimination, calling on him to take a firm public stance against anti-Arab bias and to address stereotypes and prejudice through educational initiatives for youth in the city. Additional coverage of these campaigns and the city council’s involvement appeared in the Israeli media.

In June 2019, a demonstration happened in protest against a house being sold to an Arab family, joined by Afula's mayor, Avi Elkabetz, who had run for office on a platform of "preserving the Jewish character of Afula."

== Demographics ==
Historical population
Year	Pop.	±%
1972	17,400	—
1983	21,500	+23.6%
1995	33,800	+57.2%
2008	40,200	+18.9%
2022	60,828	+51.3%
2024	66,362	+9.1%

In 2022, 89.5% of the population was Jewish and 10.5% was counted as other.

== Climate ==
Afula has a Mediterranean climate (Köppen climate classification: Csa). The average annual temperature is 20.4 °C (68.7 °F), and around 468 mm (18.43 in) of precipitation falls annually.

Climate data for Afula (1991–2020)
Month	Jan	Feb	Mar	Apr	May	Jun	Jul	Aug	Sep	Oct	Nov	Dec	Year
Record high °C (°F)	24.7 (76.5)	28.4 (83.1)	37.0 (98.6)	40.9 (105.6)	43.2 (109.8)	44.1 (111.4)	41.9 (107.4)	41.5 (106.7)	43.2 (109.8)	40.2 (104.4)	35.6 (96.1)	28.8 (83.8)	44.1 (111.4)
Mean daily maximum °C (°F)	16.9 (62.4)	18.2 (64.8)	21.6 (70.9)	26.0 (78.8)	30.1 (86.2)	32.5 (90.5)	34.2 (93.6)	34.6 (94.3)	33.4 (92.1)	30.9 (87.6)	24.9 (76.8)	19.0 (66.2)	26.9 (80.4)
Daily mean °C (°F)	11.5 (52.7)	12.1 (53.8)	14.6 (58.3)	18.2 (64.8)	22.2 (72.0)	25.4 (77.7)	27.7 (81.9)	28.3 (82.9)	26.6 (79.9)	23.6 (74.5)	18.0 (64.4)	13.2 (55.8)	20.1 (68.2)
Mean daily minimum °C (°F)	5.9 (42.6)	5.9 (42.6)	7.6 (45.7)	10.3 (50.5)	14.3 (57.7)	18.2 (64.8)	21.2 (70.2)	21.9 (71.4)	19.8 (67.6)	16.2 (61.2)	11.1 (52.0)	7.4 (45.3)	13.3 (55.9)
Record low °C (°F)	−5.2 (22.6)	−2.5 (27.5)	−0.4 (31.3)	−1.5 (29.3)	6.2 (43.2)	11.4 (52.5)	15.4 (59.7)	15.6 (60.1)	10.2 (50.4)	6.9 (44.4)	−0.3 (31.5)	−3.0 (26.6)	−5.2 (22.6)
Average rainfall mm (inches)	110.4 (4.35)	96.6 (3.80)	54.9 (2.16)	15.8 (0.62)	4.5 (0.18)	0.8 (0.03)	0.0 (0.0)	0.0 (0.0)	0.7 (0.03)	19.5 (0.77)	61.2 (2.41)	101.4 (3.99)	465.8 (18.34)
Average rainy days (≥ 0.1 mm)	11.7	10.6	7.8	3.1	1.1	0.1	0.0	0.0	0.3	3.1	6.6	10.0	54.4
Source 1: NOAA
Source 2: World Meteorological Organization (rainfall and rain days 1981–2010)

== Economy ==
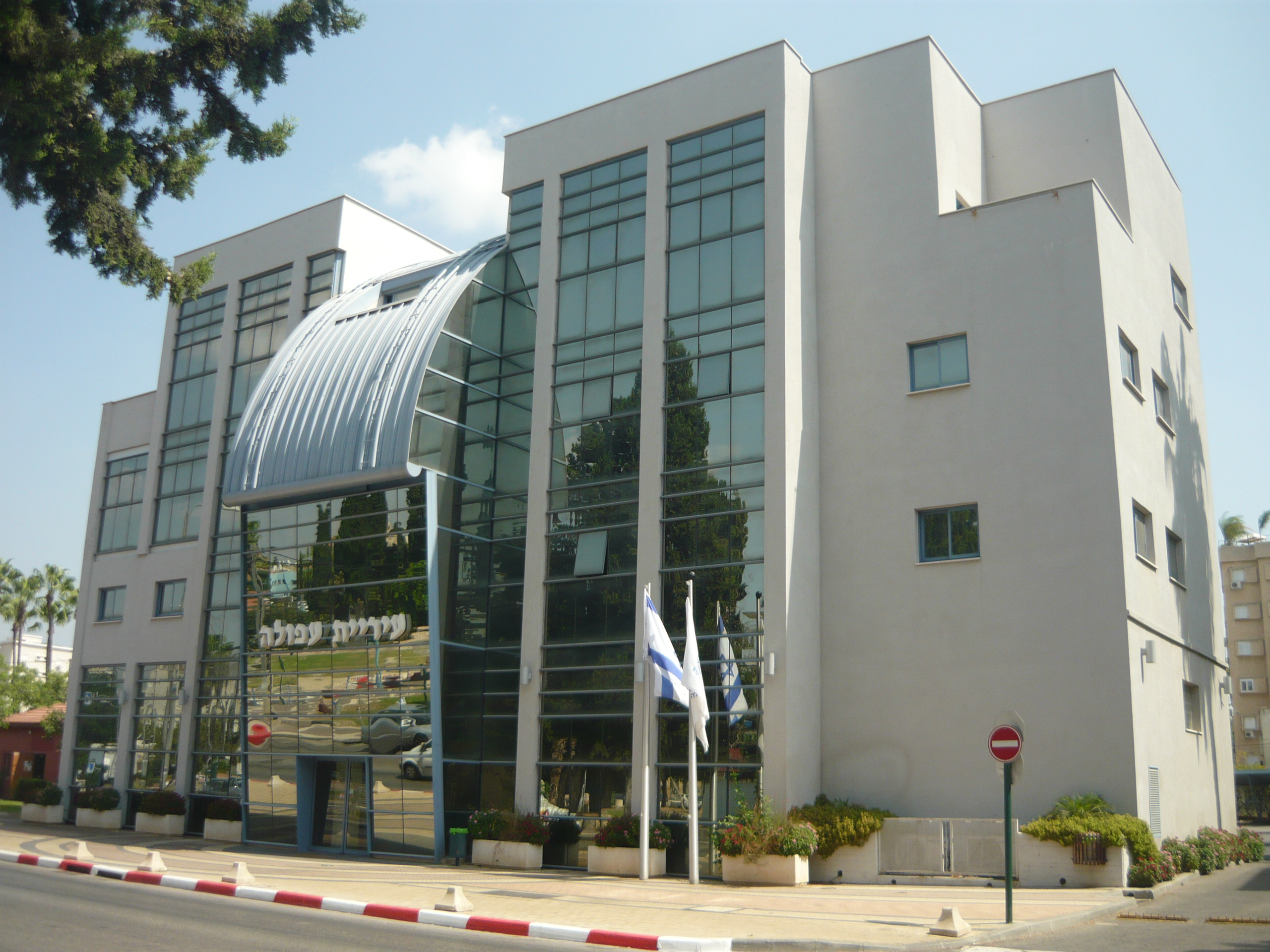
Afula city hall

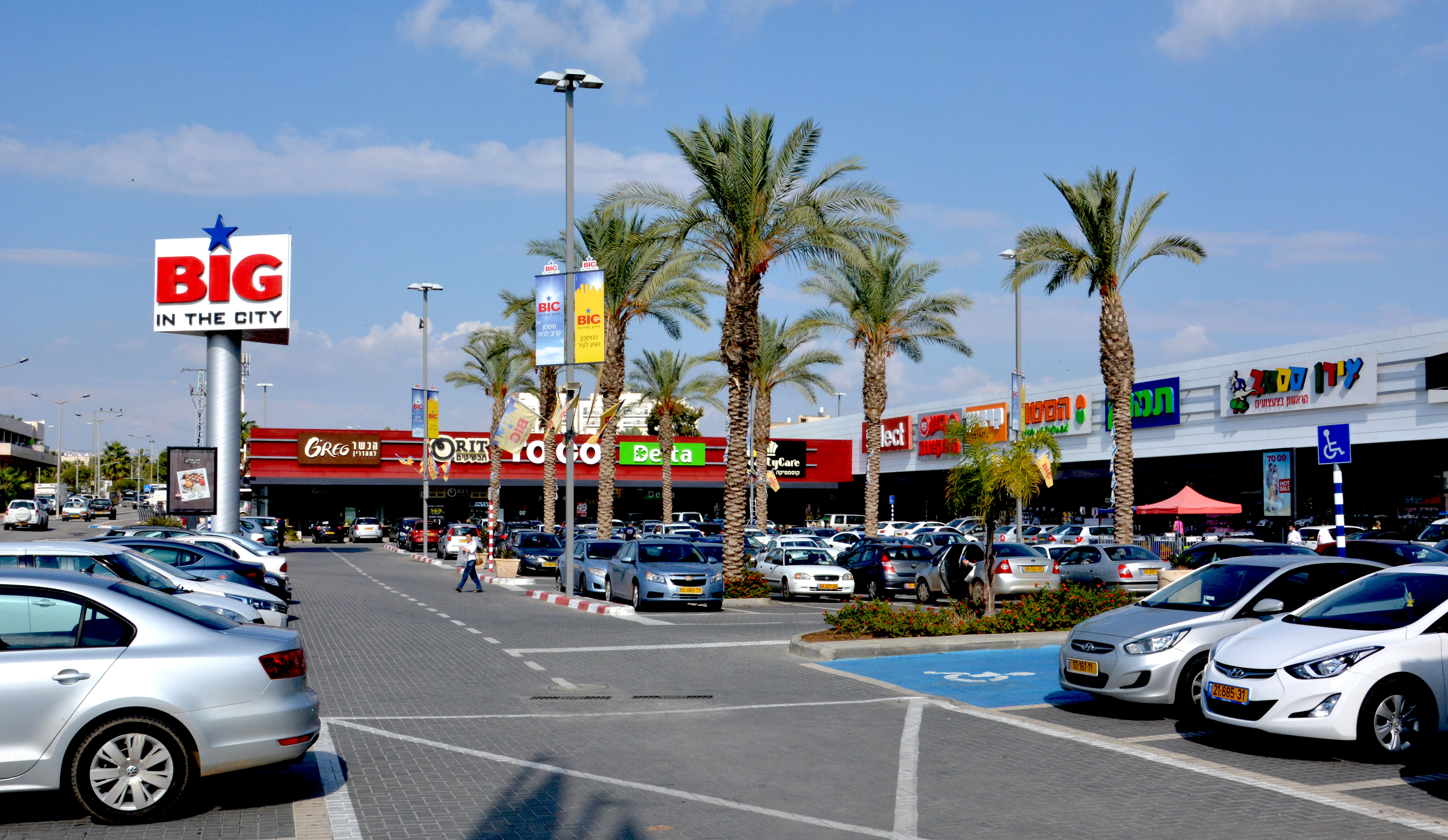
BIG shopping center

The Alon Tavor Industrial Zone, located northeast of Afula along Highway 65, is a major hub of manufacturing and industry in the region. Notable companies based there include:

- Tadiran, an air conditioner factory.
- Keter Plastic, an Israeli plastics manufacturer.
- StarPlast, another plastics manufacturing company operating in the zone.

These enterprises provide significant local employment and support the city’s economic base within the Jezreel Valley.

== Education and culture ==
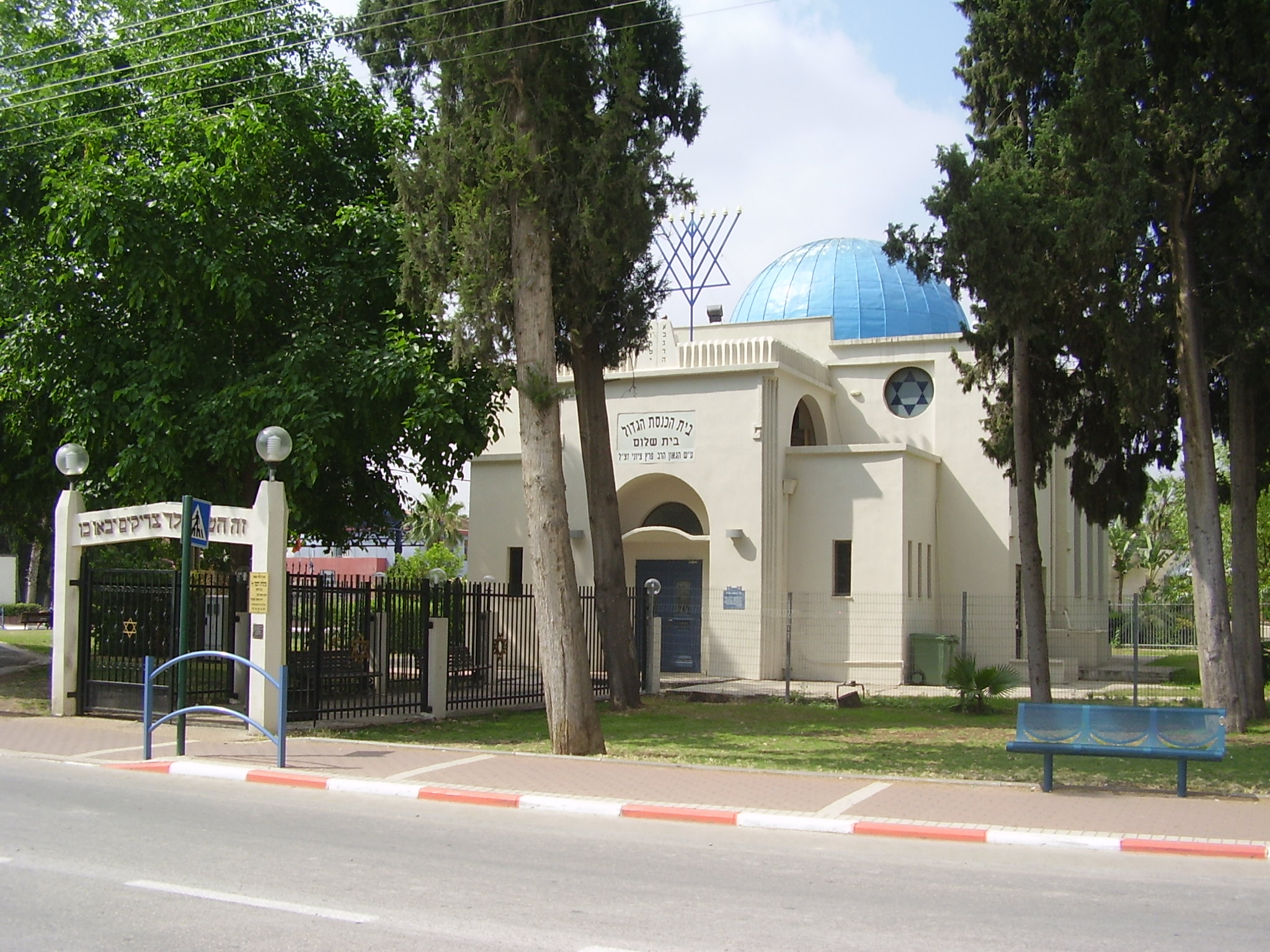
Great synagogue of Afula

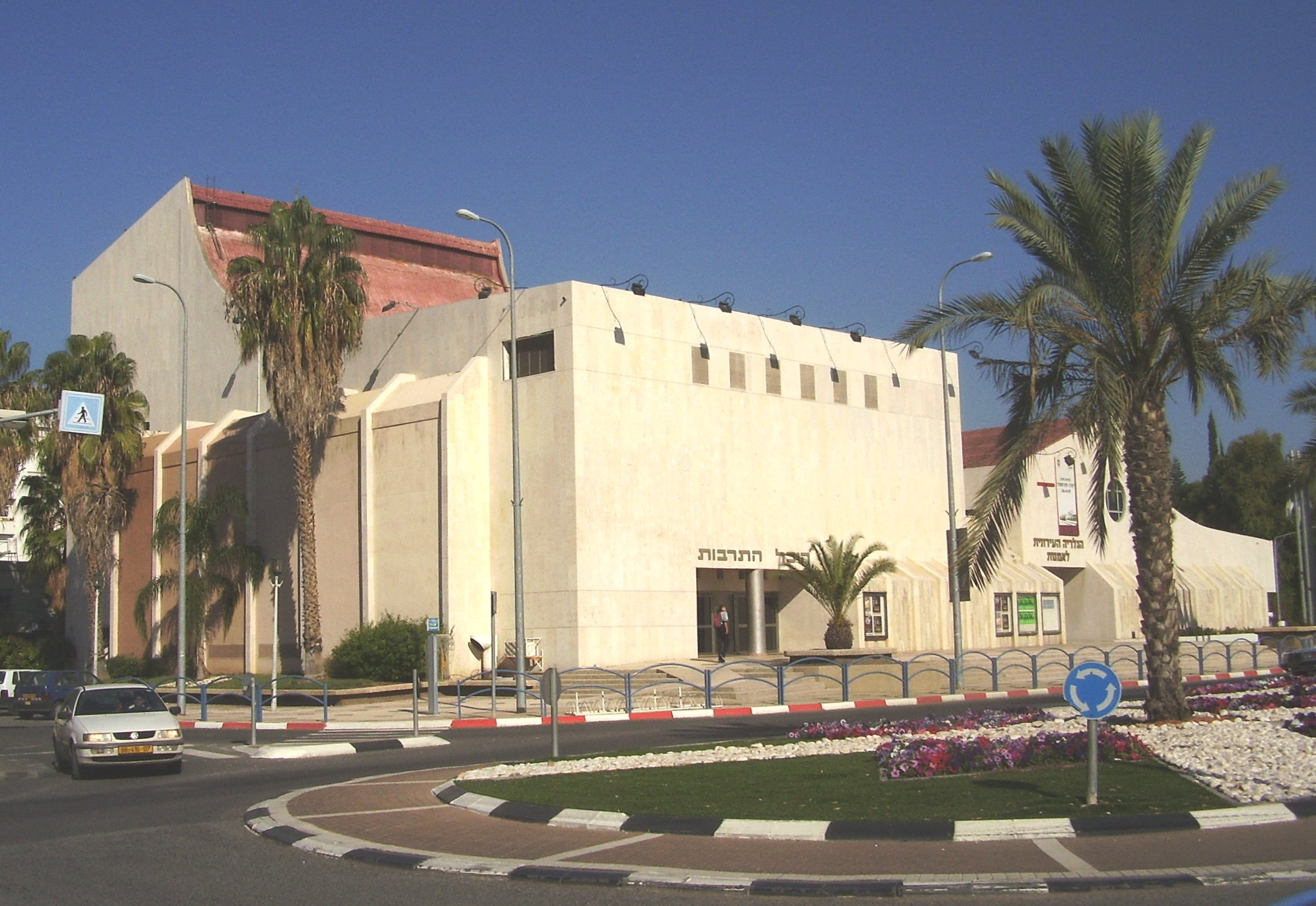
City Auditorium and Art Gallery

According to the Israeli Central Bureau of Statistics (CBS), as of 2001 there were 24 schools in Afula, serving a total of 8,688 students: 16 elementary schools with 3,814 students and 12 high schools with 4,874 students. In that year, 52.3% of 12th-grade students were eligible for a bagrut (matriculation certificate).

Cultural life in Afula includes community events, parks, and leisure programming that contribute to quality of life. The municipality emphasizes the importance of both formal and informal education, aiming to foster academic aspiration, communal values, integrity, and excellence. Sports also play a role as an educational tool to promote healthy lifestyles, teamwork, and civic responsibility.

== Health care ==
Afula’s primary health institution, HaEmek Medical Center, was established on 29 April 1930 following initial planning in 1924. It is a major regional hospital, serving an estimated 700,000 residents from Afula and surrounding areas, with a workforce of around 1,900 employees.

HaEmek is a district general and teaching hospital, affiliated with the Rappaport Faculty of Medicine at the Technion, and is operated by Clalit Health Services. It is also noted as a place of Arab–Israeli coexistence, where personnel from diverse backgrounds work together.

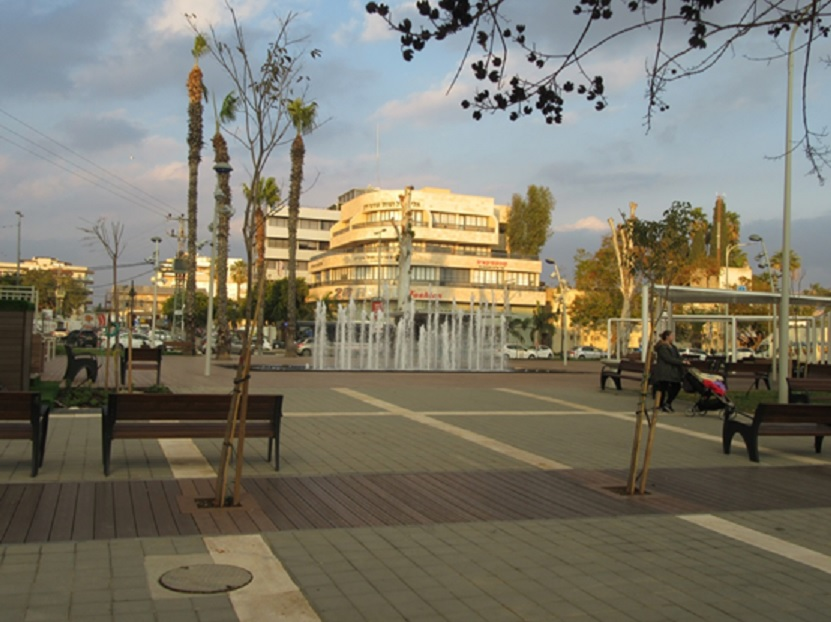
HaAtzmaut Square

== Sports ==
The city's basketball club, Hapoel Afula, currently play in the Liga Leumit. The main football club, Hapoel Afula, won Liga Alef in the 2012–13 season and is currently playing in Liga Leumit.

== Voting Patterns ==
In the 2022 election, 69 percent of voters in Afula voted for the parties of the right-wing coalition led by Benjamin Netanyahu, while 28 percent voted for the parties of the center-left coalition led by Yair Lapid and 0.3 percent voted for the Arab parties.

In the 2026 election, 64 percent of voters in Afula voted for the parties of the right-wing coalition led by Benjamin Netanyahu, while 29 percent voted for the parties of the center-left coalition led by Gadi Eisenkot and 0.6 percent voted for the Arab parties. An additional 3.1 percent voted for the Reservists, and 1.9 percent voted for Amcha Yisrael. Voter turnout increased 24 percent from the 2022 election.

== Twin towns ==
City	State	Country
Ingelheim am Rhein	Rhineland-Palatinate	Germany
Osnabrück	Lower Saxony	Germany
Biłgoraj	Lublin Voivodeship	Poland
Providence	Rhode Island	United States
Worcester	Massachusetts	United States
New Haven	Connecticut	United States
Stamford	Connecticut	United States
Bridgeport	Connecticut	United States
West Hartford	Connecticut	United States
Hartford	Connecticut	United States
Fresno	California	United States
Santa Fe	Santa Fe Province	Argentina
Mingachevir	Mingachevir	Azerbaijan
San Fernando	O'Higgins Region	Chile

== Notable people ==
- Mosh Ben-Ari (born 1970), musician, lyricist and composer
- Amir Blumenfeld (born 1983), writer, comedian, actor, and television host
- Yaakov Bodo (born 1931), actor and comedian
- Dina Doron (born 1940), actress
- Sarit Hadad (born 1978), singer
- Eden Kartsev (born 2000), football player
- David Kushnir (born 1931), Olympic long-jumper
- Hila Lulu Linn (born 1964), artist
- Nikol Reznikov (born 1999), model and Miss Universe Israel 2018
- Samuel Scheimann (born 1987), football player
- Dagan Yivzori (born 1985), basketball player
- Vini Vici (Matan Kadosh & Aviram Saharai) (born 1983 & 1985), DJ/producer duo

== Bibliography ==
- Barag, Dan (1979). "A new source concerning the ultimate borders of the Latin Kingdom of Jerusalem". Israel Exploration Journal. 29: 197–217.
- Bron, Hendrik (Enno) (2013). "'Afula Final Report". Hadashot Arkheologiyot – Excavations and Surveys in Israel. 125.
- Buckingham, J.S. (1822). Travels in Palestine through the countries of Bashan and Gilead, east of the River Jordan, including a visit to the cities of Geraza and Gamala in the Decapolis. Vol. 2. London: Longman, Hurst, Rees, Orme and Brown.
- Conder, C.R. (1876). "Samaritan Topography". Quarterly Statement. 22 (4). Palestine Exploration Fund: 182–197. doi:10.1179/peq.1876.8.4.182.
- Conder, C.R.; Kitchener, H.H. (1882). The Survey of Western Palestine: Memoirs of the Topography, Orography, Hydrography, and Archaeology. Vol. 2. London: Committee of the Palestine Exploration Fund.
- Dalali-Amos, Edna (2009). "'Afula: Final Report". Hadashot Arkheologiyot – Excavations and Surveys in Israel. 121. Israel Antiquities Authority.
- Dalali-Amos, Edna (2012). "Afula". Hadashot Arkheologiyot. 124. Israel Antiquities Authority.
- Dalali-Amos, Edna (2014). "'Afula: Final Report". Hadashot Arkheologiyot. 126. Israel Antiquities Authority.
- Dalali-Amos, Edna; Getzov, Nimrod (2014). "'Afula: Preliminary Report". Hadashot Arkheologiyot. 126. Israel Antiquities Authority.
- Eisenberg, Michael (2006). "'Afula, Tel". Hadashot Arkheologiyot. 118.
- Feig, Nurit (2012). "'Afula, Tel: Final Report". Hadashot Arkheologiyot. 124. Israel Antiquities Authority. Archived from the original on 18 May 2013.
- Glass, Joseph B. (2002). From new Zion to old Zion: American Jewish immigration and settlement in Palestine, 1917-1939. Detroit: Wayne State University Press. ISBN 0814328423.
- Government of Palestine, Department of Statistics (1945). Village Statistics, April, 1945. Archived from the original on 18 December 2025.
- Guérin, V. (1880). Description Géographique Historique et Archéologique de la Palestine (in French). Vol. 3: Galilee, pt. 1. Paris: L'Imprimerie Nationale.
- Hadawi, S. (1970). Village Statistics of 1945: A Classification of Land and Area ownership in Palestine. Palestine Liberation Organization Research Center. Archived from the original on 8 December 2018.
- Karmon, Y. (1960). "An Analysis of Jacotin's Map of Palestine" (PDF). Israel Exploration Journal. 10 (3, 4): 155–173, 244–253. Archived from the original (PDF) on 22 December 2019.
- Mills, E., ed. (1932). Census of Palestine 1931. Population of Villages, Towns and Administrative Areas. Jerusalem: Government of Palestine.
- Palmer, E.H. (1881). The Survey of Western Palestine: Arabic and English Name Lists Collected During the Survey by Lieutenants Conder and Kitchener, R. E. Transliterated and Explained by E.H. Palmer. Committee of the Palestine Exploration Fund.
- Pringle, D. (1997). Secular buildings in the Crusader Kingdom of Jerusalem: an archaeological Gazetter. Cambridge University Press. ISBN 0521-46010-7.
- Robinson, E.; Smith, E. (1841). Biblical Researches in Palestine, Mount Sinai and Arabia Petraea: A Journal of Travels in the year 1838. Vol. 3. Boston: Crocker & Brewster.
- Schumacher, G. (1888). "Population list of the Liwa of Akka". Quarterly Statement. 20. Palestine Exploration Fund: 169–191.
- Schumacher, G. (1900). "Reports from Galilee". Quarterly Statement - Palestine Exploration Fund. 32 (4): 355–360. doi:10.1179/peq.1900.32.4.355.
- Segev, T. (1999). One Palestine Complete: Jews and Arabs Under the British Mandate. London: Abacus. ISBN 978-0-349-11286-2.
- Thomson, W.M. (1859). The Land and the Book: Or, Biblical Illustrations Drawn from the Manners and Customs, the Scenes and Scenery, of the Holy Land. Vol. 2 (1 ed.). New York: Harper & brothers.
- Zevulun, U., "Tell el-Yahudiyeh Juglets from a Potter’s Refuse Pit at Afula", Eretz-Israel 21 (1990), pp. 174–190, p. 107.
