= Tel Aviv central bus station massacre =

2003 suicide bombings in Tel Aviv, Israel

- Part of the Second Intifada terrorism campaign
- The attack site
- Location: 32°3′34″N 34°46′42″E; Tel Aviv, Israel
- Date: January 5, 2003; 23 years ago
- Attack type: Suicide bombing
- Deaths: 23 (15 Israeli civilians and 8 foreigners) (+ 2 suicide bombers)
- Injuries: 100+ civilians

The Tel Aviv central bus station massacre was an attack which occurred on January 5, 2003 in which two Palestinian suicide bombers blew themselves up outside the Tel Aviv Central Bus Station in Tel Aviv, Israel, killing 23 civilians and injuring over 100.
