= Afula mall bombing =

2003 Palestinian terrorist attack in Israel

- Part of the Second Intifada militancy campaign
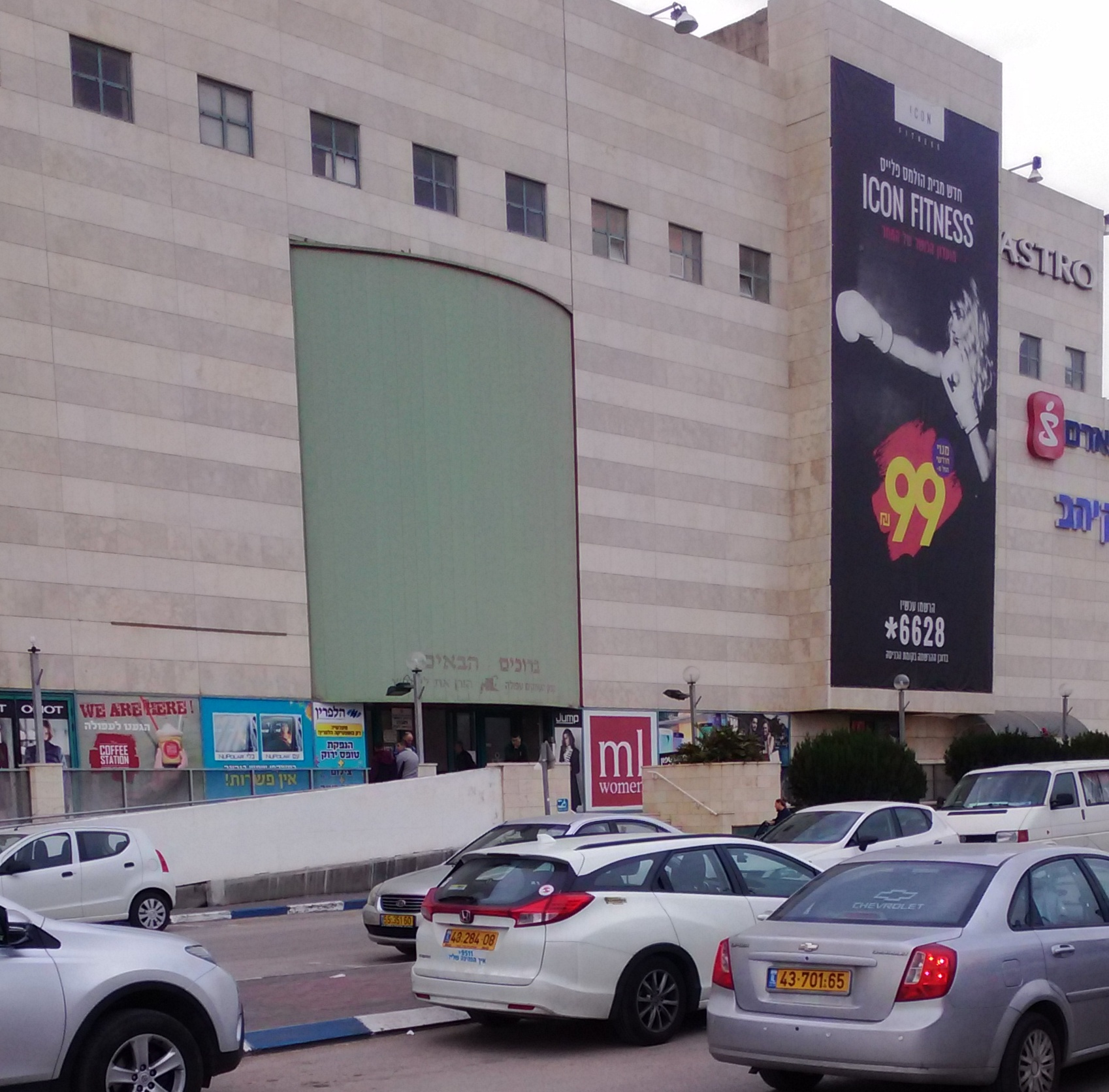
- Shaarei HaAmakim mall

- The attack site
- Native name: הפיגוע בקניון העמקים
- Location: 32°36′13″N 35°17′39″E; Afula, Israel
- Date: May 19, 2003; 23 years ago 17:14 pm (GMT+2)
- Attack type: Suicide bombing
- Weapon: Suicide vest
- Deaths: 3 civilians (+1 bomber)
- Injuries: 70 civilians
- Perpetrators: Palestinian Islamic Jihad and al-Aqsa Martyrs' Brigades claimed responsibility.
- Assailants: 19-year-old female assailant (Hiba Daraghmeh)

The Afula mall bombing was a suicide bombing on May 19, 2003, in which a Palestinian woman blew herself up outside the Shaarei HaAmakim mall in Afula, Israel, killing three Israeli civilians and injuring 70.

Both Palestinian Islamic Jihad and the al-Aqsa Martyrs' Brigades claimed responsibility for the attack.

== The attack ==
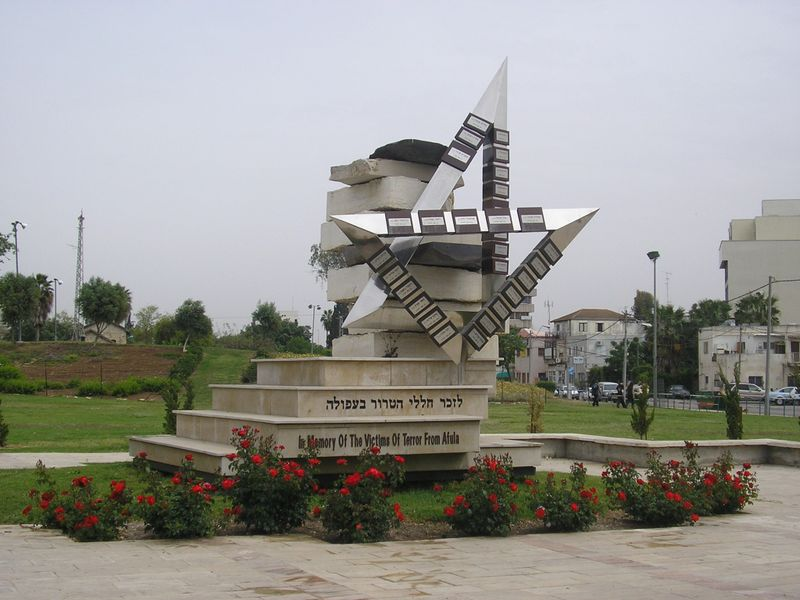
Memorial for the Israelis killed in Afula

On Monday, May 19, 2003, at 17:14 pm, a Palestinian suicide bomber approached the entrance to the Shaarei HaAmakim mall in the city of Afula in northern Israel. The suicide bomber detonated the explosives hidden underneath her clothes when she approached the security the guards at the entrance for the security inspection. Three people were killed in the attack (two security guards and a shopper) and 70 people were injured.

== The victims ==
Three victims were killed. They were:

- Kiryl Shremko, 22, Afula
- Hassan Ismail Tawatha, 41, Jisr a-Zarqa
- Avi Zerihan, 36, Beit Shean

== The perpetrator ==
After the attack, both Palestinian Islamic Jihad and the al-Aqsa Martyrs' Brigades claimed responsibility for the attack. They stated that the suicide bomber was a 19-year-old Palestinian woman from the city Tubas in the northeastern West Bank named Hiba Daraghmeh, who was an English literature student.

== See also ==
- Palestinian political violence
- al-Aqsa Martyrs' Brigades
