= 2003 Café Hillel bombing =

2003 Palestinian suicide bombing in Jerusalem

Café Hillel bombing
- Part of the Second Intifada militancy campaign
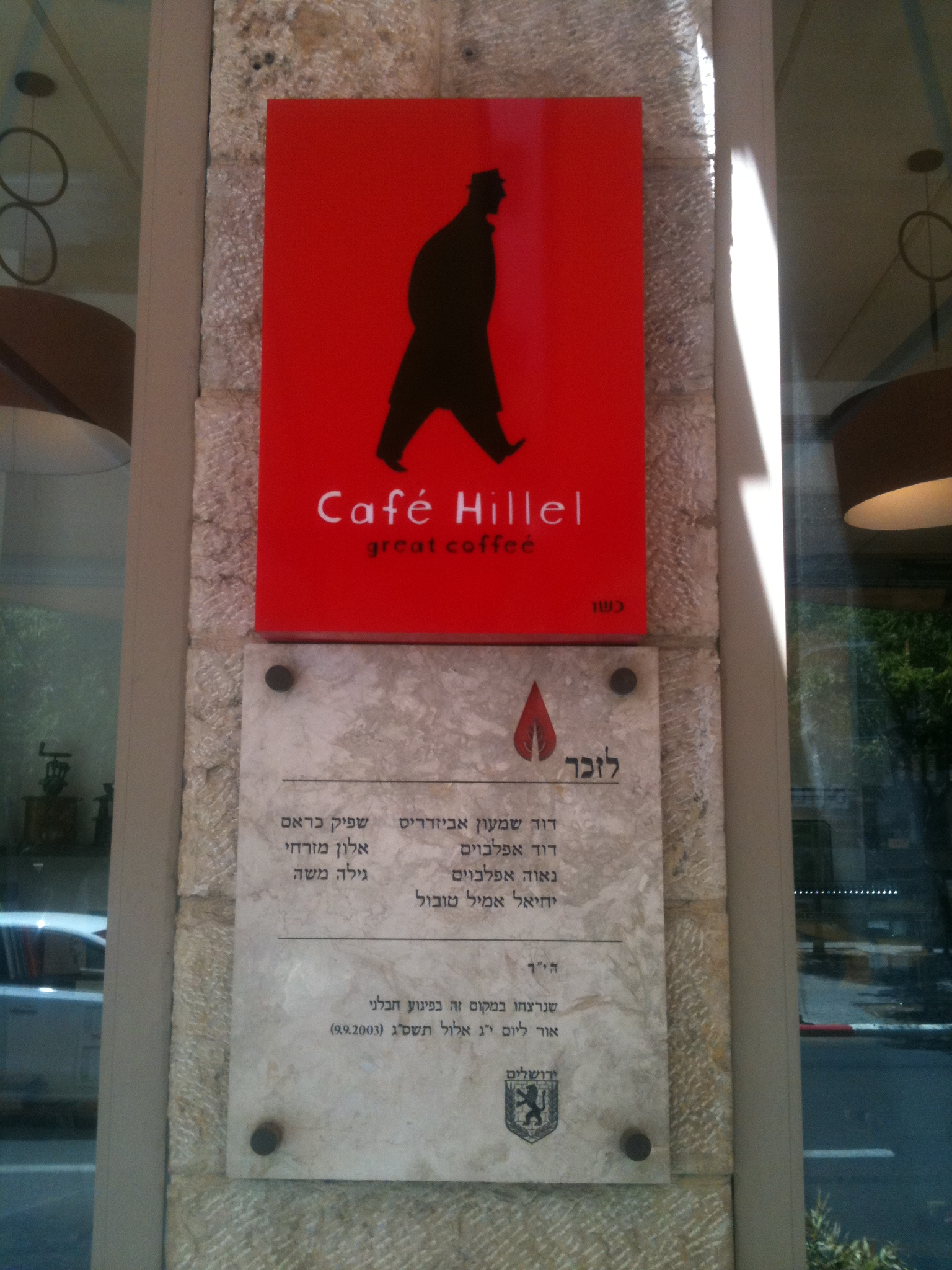
- Memorial plaque for bombing victims

- The attack site
- Native name: הפיגוע בקפה הלל
- Location: 31°46′53″N 35°13′15″E; West Jerusalem
- Date: 9 September 2003; 23 years ago 23:15 (UTC+2)
- Attack type: Suicide bombing
- Weapon: 3–4 kilograms (6.6–8.8 lb) suicide vest
- Deaths: 7 Israeli civilians (+1 bomber)
- Injuries: 50+ Israeli civilians

The Café Hillel bombing occurred on 9 September 2003, when a Palestinian suicide bomber blew himself in Café Hillel in German Colony, Jerusalem. Seven people were killed in the attack and over 50 were injured.

A few hours prior to the bombing, Palestinian militants carried out a suicide attack in a bus stop next to the military base Tzrifin.

== The attack ==
A few hours before the bombing, on 9 September, Applebaum attended the mikveh (ritual bath), as required by Halakha (Jewish law) for all brides prior to their wedding. She then began helping her family with the wedding arrangements, when her father decided to take her out for a "father-daughter" talk before her wedding. They went to Café Hillel on Emek Refaim Street, in Jerusalem.

On the day of the bombing, 9 September, security guards in the vicinity of Café Hillel were told to be on the lookout for a suicide bomber.

On Tuesday evening, 9 September 2003, at 11:20 pm, a Palestinian suicide bomber approached the "Café Hillel" coffee shop in the German Colony neighborhood of Jerusalem. At around 11:20 pm, a security guard stationed at a nearby pizza parlor noticed a man walking by with a bulky square-shaped box under his shirt. He yelled at the man to stop, but the man refused. The security guard did not want to shoot him in the back, for fear that it would detonate the bomb. A few seconds later, the suicide bomber detonated the bomb close to the entrance of Café Hillel. Security guard Alon Mizrahi was attempting to prevent the bomber from entering when he blew himself up. Nava and her father were entering the cafe at that time. Nava was dead by the time she was reached by paramedics. Dr. David Applebaum, an emergency room doctor who had treated numerous suicide attack victims himself, was also killed.

== Biographies ==
Nava (or Naava) Applebaum (also spelled Appelbaum) (Hebrew: נאווה אפלבאום; c. 1983 – 9 September 2003) was a 20-year-old Israeli-American woman who was murdered together with her father on the evening before her wedding by a Palestinian suicide bomber.

Nava was the eldest daughter of David and Debra Applebaum, the third of six children. David Applebaum was a prominent emergency department doctor well known for work on methods for assisting suicide bombing victims. He was born in Detroit, Michigan, and moved to Chicago, Illinois, as a teenager. After being ordained as a rabbi, he attended Northwestern University and graduated with a Masters in Biology. David then attended the University of Toledo Medical Center. He moved to Israel in 1982, and traveled back at times to practice in the United States.

David's daughter Nava was born in Cleveland, Ohio. The family later moved to Israel, where David became chief of the emergency department and trauma services at Jerusalem's Shaare Zedek Medical Center, and Nava graduated from Horev Girls High School. Applebaum first met her fiancé, Chanan Sand, when she was 17 and he was 16, at an Ezra religious youth group, where they both served as youth group advisers. A year later they were engaged, but delayed their wedding for two years. As part of her two-year Sherut Leumi service (alternative national service), Applebaum worked with children with cancer. She planned on studying chemistry or genetics at the Hebrew University of Jerusalem, and her goal was to find a cure for cancer.

Sand and Applebaum scheduled their wedding for 10 September 2003, in Ramat Rachel, a kibbutz south of Jerusalem.

=== Funerals ===
Applebaum's fiancé, Chanan Sand, collapsed in the emergency department of Shaare Zedek Medical Center upon hearing that his fiancée had not survived. She was buried the next day adjacent to her father in the Har HaMenuchot cemetery, in the western part of Jerusalem.

Hundreds of friends and relatives traveling to Israel for the wedding arrived to find that they would be attending her funeral instead, on the day she was supposed to get married. Sand attended the funeral, and placed in her grave the wedding ring he had planned on giving her at the wedding.

== Assailant ==
The assailant was Hamas member Ramez Fahmi Izz al-Din Abu Salim (short: Ramez Abu Salim), age 22, who originated from the village of Rantis, and had been a student of Birzeit or Al-Quds Open University (Al-Bireh campus), where he acted as an Islamic Block activist. He had previously been held in administrative detention and was released seven months before the attack.

== Aftermath ==
=== Victims' families ===
Applebaum's fiancé, Chanan Sand, was unable to date for several years after her death because of his grief, but became engaged in 2009. Members of the Applebaum family attended the engagement party.

In 2006, Nava's brother Yitzchak was in medical school. At that time, her sister Shira was a paramedic planning on attending medical school. When Shira got married she used Nava's wedding gown as part of the canopy.

=== Tributes and reactions ===
Journalist Yossi Klein Halevi described the incident as an "epic tragedy", and wrote: "If a new book of the Bible were ever written about the modern return to Zion, it would have to include the story of the Applebaums." The poignant tragedy of a father and daughter murdered on the evening before the daughter's wedding moved Israelis, who continue to recall the tragedy years later.

A few days after the bombing, another engaged couple decided to hold their Sheva Brachot celebrations at the site of the suicide attack. The choice of venue was intended "as a sign of 'continuity'". The celebration was video-conferenced to numerous Jewish communities around the world.

Numerous memorials and charity projects were undertaken in memory of Nava Applebaum. The top of Applebaum's unworn wedding gown was made into a covering for the Torah ark at Rachel's Tomb. It is inscribed: "Nava Applebaum, A Bride for Eternity." The skirt of the wedding gown was formed into a wedding canopy for other couples to stand beneath during their chuppah ceremony.

Dr. Paige Applebaum Farkas, a Teaneck, New Jersey, resident and second cousin to David Applebaum, and her brother, Dr. Eric Applebaum, also of Teaneck, raised money to build a special room for brides at the mikvah in the Har Homa neighborhood of Jerusalem.

A memorial service honoring Nava and her father held in New Jersey one year after their deaths drew over a thousand people.

The Naava Applebaum Circle of Life Endowment was established by the Shaare Zedek Medical Center in Jerusalem, and it supports the Sherut Leumi service, in which Nava Applebaum participated.

All Bat Mitzvah girls (12-year-old girls, who at that age become responsible for their actions according to Jewish law) of Moriah School in Englewood, New Jersey receive a book of Psalms inscribed in the memory of Nava Applebaum.

A dowry fund was also established, the Naava Applebaum Kallah Fund, for brides that cannot afford the basic wedding necessities.

=== Perpetrators ===
On 14 March 2010, Israeli military forces caught the Hamas militant leader Maher Udda, who participated in the execution of both these suicide attacks as well as other terrorist attack.

In October 2011, Ibrahim Dar Musa, who was involved in the planning of the suicide attack, was released from prison as part of the Gilad Shalit prisoner exchange.

In 2004, Nael Obeid, a Palestinian man, was sentenced to seven life sentences and 30 years for the part he played in the bombing. After serving 21 years in prison, he was released in February 2025 as part of a hostage-prisoner exchange during the Gaza war. Obeid fell to his death a few days later, the cause of his fall not being immediately clear.

== See also ==
- Tzrifin bus stop attack
