= Tzrifin bus stop attack =

2003 suicide bombing in Israel

- Part of the Second Intifada militancy campaign
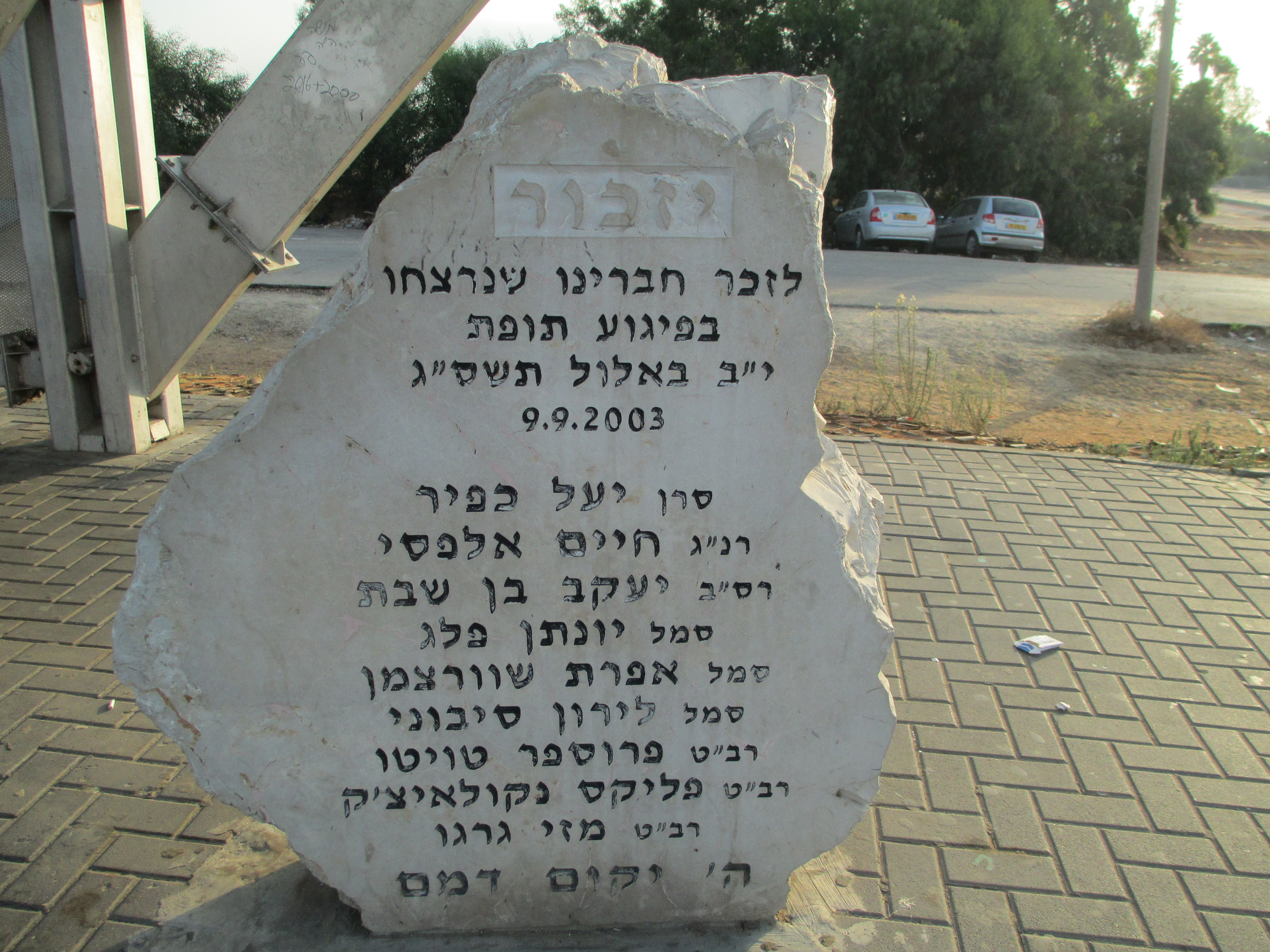
- Memorial to the victims of the attack

- The attack site
- Native name: הפיגוע בתחנת האוטובוס בצריפין
- Location: 31°58′12″N 34°50′36″E; Tzrifin, Israel
- Date: 9 September 2003; 23 years ago 17:50 pm (UTC+2)
- Attack type: Suicide bombing
- Deaths: 9 soldiers (+1 bomber)
- Injuries: 15+ soldiers
- Perpetrator: Hamas

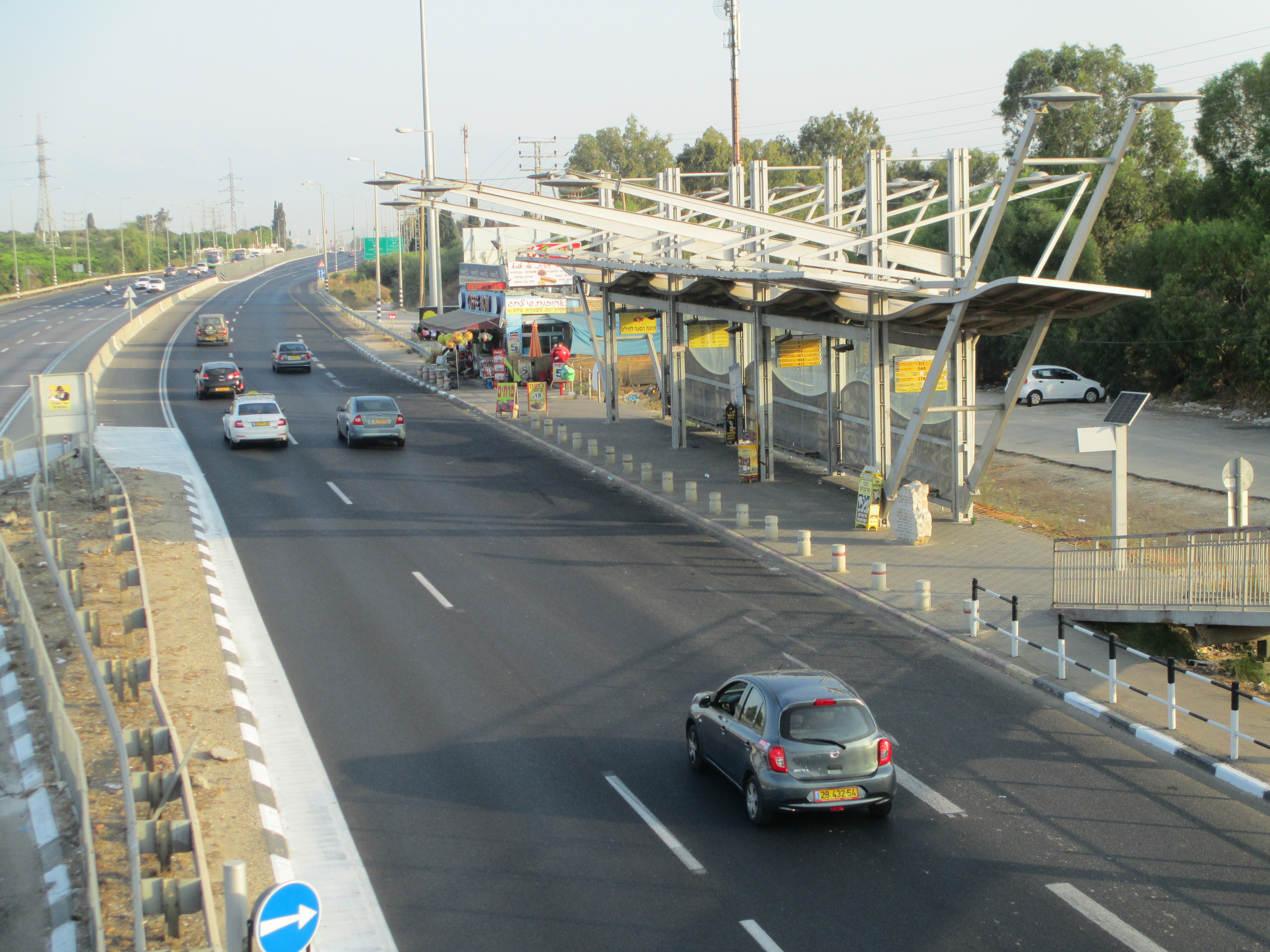
The bus station where the attack took place

The Tzrifin attack was a suicide bombing, which occurred on 9 September 2003 in a bus stop in central Israel next to the military base Tzrifin. 9 IDF soldiers were killed in the attack and more than 15 soldiers were injured.

The attack was carried out by a terrorist sent by the Hamas from Beit Liqya. He blew himself up inside the hitchhiking station at the Jaffa Gate of Camp Tzrifin, during an evening hour when dozens of soldiers and civilians were waiting there. The steel structure of the hitchhiking station absorbed part of the explosion's force, with many metal fragments and shrapnel embedded in it, thereby preventing the further escalation of the disaster.

The reactions in the Israeli political system to the attack were intense. Members of the Knesset from "Likud" and "Shinui" demanded the elimination of the entire Hamas leadership and the expulsion of Yasser Arafat from the Palestinian Authority territories.

Just hours after the attack, the Cafe Hillel bombing was carried out by the same terrorist infrastructure.

In July 2004, a terror cell from Beit Liqya involved in the execution and planning of many attacks, including the Tzrifin bombing, was arrested. On 14 March 2010, Israel captured Maher Ouda, who headed the Hamas command in Ramallah, and was responsible for carrying out these two attacks and others.

== See also ==
- Café Hillel bombing
