= Café Hillel =

Restaurant information
- Established: 1998
- Food type: Café
- Location: Israel
- Website: Official website

Café Hillel (Hebrew: קפה הלל) was an Israeli chain of coffehouses and restaurants. Established in 1998 by Koby and Yossi Sherf, the chain had more than 25 locations across Israel. The German Colony location of the chain was the site of the 2003 Café Hillel bombing. The chain closed down the same year.

== History ==
In 1998, Koby and Yossi Sherf opened the first branch of Café Hillel on Jerusalem's Hillel Street, the source of the chain's name. They envisioned a coffee shop with a relaxed "Jerusalemite" atmosphere serving world-class coffee and food.

Most of the branches were run by franchises, with only two or three owned directly by the company. The chain had over 25 branches around the country. Cafe Hillel sells its own private label coffee and has a red and black color scheme.

In 2003, seven people were killed and over 50 wounded in the Café Hillel bombing, a suicide attack at Jerusalem's German Colony branch of the cafe. Café Hillel closed down the same year.

Café Hileni, a stand-alone restaurant, uses the chain's former URL and builds on Café Hillel's reputation.

== See also ==
- Aroma Espresso Bar
- Café Café
- List of restaurants in Israel
