= Civilian casualties in the Second Intifada =

The following is a partial list of civilian casualties in the Second Intifada. Sources disagree on the number of Israeli and Palestinian civilian casualties. According to B'Tselem, 741 Israeli civilians (including 124 children) were killed, and 2,996 Palestinian non-combatants (including 1,317 children) were killed. The International Institute for Counter-Terrorism puts Israeli civilian casualties at 765.

== Background ==
A 2007 study of Palestinian suicide bombings that took place from September 2000 through August 2005 found that 39.9 percent of the suicide attacks were carried out by Hamas, 25.7 percent by the Palestinian Islamic Jihad (PIJ), 26.4 percent by Fatah, 5.4 percent by the Popular Front for the Liberation of Palestine (PFLP) and 2.7 percent by other organizations. The youngest victim of the Second Intifada was an Israeli infant who was nine hours old. Several pregnant women have also been killed.

Israeli civilians' deaths do not show a high regularity in their age or gender distribution, as Palestinian militants chose to attack whichever civilian targets were accessible. The targets included the Dolphinarium discotheque massacre, a place frequented by Israeli youth, and open-air markets and public buses, which are disproportionately used by women and the elderly. A number of attacks against Israeli civilians have been considered massacres while others, such as the murder of a pregnant woman and her four young daughters, have been called crimes against humanity.

== Israeli non-combatant casualties ==
The following is a partial list of Israeli civilian casualties of the Second Intifada. The International Institute for Counter-Terrorism (IPICT) puts civilian deaths at 78% and Israeli combatants at 22%, between 27 September 2000 and 1 January 2005. According to B'tselem between the start of the Second Intifada and Operation Cast Lead, 731 Israeli civilians and 332 members of the Israeli security services have been killed. The Israeli civilians' deaths do not show a high regularity in their age or gender distribution, as Palestinian militants chose to attack whichever civilian targets were accessible. The targets included the Dolphinarium disco attack, a place frequented by Israeli youth, and open-air markets and public buses, which are disproportionately used by women and the elderly. A number of attacks against Israeli civilians have been considered massacres. The majority of Israeli civilian casualties were caused by suicide bombings, though Israelis have also been killed by planted bombs, shootings, stonings, stabbings, lynchings, rockets, and other methods of attack.

Date	Incident	Location	Responsible party	Deaths	Injured	Refs
October 1–9, 2000	October 2000 events	Northern Israel	Israel Police and Arab rioters	13		
October 2, 2000	Shooting attack	Masha	Unknown Palestinian	1		
October 6, 2000	Passenger in car killed by Palestinian stone-throwing	Coastal Highway near Jisr az-Zarqa	Unknown Palestinian	1		
October 19, 2000	Shooting attack	Mount Ebal near Nablus	Fatah and Palestinian security force	1		
October 30, 2000	Murder	A ravine near Beit Jala	Unknown Palestinian	1		
November 2, 2000	Mahane Yehuda Market bombing	Jerusalem	Islamic Jihad	2		
November 8, 2000	Shooting attack	Rafah border crossing	Three unknown Palestinians	1		
November 13, 2000	Shooting attack	Near Ofra	Unknown Palestinian	1		
November 13, 2000	Shooting attack	Near the Kissufim junction	Unknown Palestinian	1		
November 20, 2000	Roadside bomb	Near Kfar Darom	Unknown Palestinians	2		
November 21, 2000	Shooting attack	Gush Katif	Palestinian sniper	1		
November 22, 2000	Car bombing	Hadera	Unknown Palestinians	2		
December 8, 2000	Shooting attack	Kiryat Arba	Palestinian sniper	2		
December 21, 2000	Shooting attack	Road between Givat Ze'ev and Beit Horon	Unknown Palestinians	1		
December 31, 2000	Shooting attack	Ramallah	Palestinian snipers	2		
January 17, 2001	Abduction and murder of Ofir Rahum	Ramallah	Tanzim	1		
January 23, 2001	Abduction and execution	Tulkarem	Masked Palestinian gunmen	2		
February 1, 2001	Shooting attack	Jerusalem-Hebron highway	Palestinian gunmen	1		
February 14, 2001	2001 Palestinian Bus Attack	Holon	Khalil Mohammed Abu Alba	8		
March 4, 2001	2001 Netanya bombing	Netanya	Hamas (58)	3		
March 26, 2001	Murder of Shalhevet Pass	Hebron	Palestinian sniper	1		
March 28, 2001	Suicide bombing	Mifgash HaShalom	Hamas	2		
April 1, 2001	Stabbing attack	Ha'aztmaut Street	Terrorist group apprehended in July	1		
April 21, 2001	Man killed and mutilated	Village north of Ramallah	Unknown terrorist	1		
April 22, 2001	Bomb detonated at a bus stop	Weizman and Tchernichovsky streets	Hamas	1		
April 28, 2001	Stabbing attack	Kfar Ba'aneh	Six members of a Hezbollah-linked Palestinian terrorist cell	1		
May 8, 2001	Murder of Koby Mandell and Yosef Ishran	Tekoa	Palestinian militants	2		
May 15, 2001	Shooting attack	Alon Highway	Palestinian militants	1		
May 18, 2001	2001 HaSharon Mall suicide bombing	Netanya	Hamas	5		
May 23, 2001	Shooting attack	Outside Ariel	Palestinian gunmen	1		
May 29, 2001	Two women killed in a drive-by Shooting attack	Gush Etzion	Tanzim	2 (Sara Blaustein and Esther Alvan)		
May 29, 2001	Shooting attack	Between Kedumim and Yitzhar	Tanzim	1		
June 1, 2001	Dolphinarium discotheque suicide bombing	Tel Aviv	Hamas	21		
June 11, 2001	Infant killed in stoning attack	Shilo	Unknown Palestinian	1		
June 18, 2001	Drive-by Shooting attack	Between Homesh and Shavei Shomron	Palestinian militants	1		
June 18, 2001	Shooting attack	Near the entrance of Einav	Fatah	1		
June 20, 2001	Shooting attack	Silat a-Dahar	Palestinian gunman	1		
June 28, 2001	Shooting attack	Northern Samaria	Palestinian gunman	1		
July 2, 2001	Shooting attack	Baka a-Sharkia	Palestinian gunman	1		
July 2, 2001	Shooting attack	Hebron	Palestinian militants	1		
July 4, 2001	Shooting attack	Near Tulkarem	Palestinian militant	1		
July 10, 2001	Shooting attack	Moshav Ahisemekh	Two Palestinian militants	1		
July 13, 2001	Shooting attack	Between Kiryat Arba and Hebron	Palestinian militants	1		
July 14, 2001	Drive-by Shooting attack	Kiryat Arba	Palestinian militants	1		
July 24, 2001	Stabbing and Shooting attack	Ramallah	Unknown Palestinian	1		
July 26, 2001	Shooting attack	Jerusalem	Palestinian terrorists	1		
August 5, 2001	Shooting attack	Between Alfei Menashe and Karnei Shomron	Palestinian gunmen	1		
August 6, 2001	Shooting attack	Amman	Palestinian militant	1		
August 9, 2001	Sbarro restaurant suicide bombing	Downtown Jerusalem	Hamas and Islamic Jihad	15		
August 9, 2001	Teenager killed in a drive-by Shooting attack	Gilboa region	Palestinian militants	1		
August 25, 2001	Men killed when gunmen opened fire on their car	Jerusalem-Modi'in	Palestinian gunmen	3		
August 26, 2001	Shooting attack	Near the entrance to the village of Zaita, opposite Kibbutz Magal	Fatah	1		
August 27, 2001	Shooting attack	Between Har Bracha and Itamar	Palestinian militant	1		
August 29, 2001	Shooting attack	Outside Kutchin	Palestinian militants	1		
August 30, 2001	Shooting at point blank range	Na'alin	Masked Palestinian gunma	1		
September 9, 2001	Nahariya train station suicide bombing	Nahariya	Hamas	3		
September 12, 2001	Shooting attack	Near Habla	Palestinian militants	1		
September 15, 2001	Shooting attack	Jerusalem	Palestinian militants	1		
September 20, 2001	Shooting attack	Tekoa	Al-Aqsa Martyr's Battalion	1		
September 24, 2001	Shooting attack	Shadmot Mehola	Islamic Jihad	1		
September 26, 2001	Shooting attack	Moshav Maor	Fatah	1		
October 4, 2001	Shooting attack	Afula	Fatah	3		
October 5, 2001	Shooting attack	Avnei Hafetz	Palestinian militants	1		
October 17, 2001	Assassination of Rehavam Ze'evi	Hyatt hotel, Mount Scopus, Jerusalem	Popular Front for the Liberation of Palestine	1		
October 28, 2001	Shooting attack	Hadera	Islamic Jihad	4		
November 4, 2001	Shooting attack	Northern Jerusalem	Palestinian militant	2		
November 9, 2001	Shooting attack	Northern Samaria	Palestinian terrorists	1		
November 11, 2001	Shooting attack	Moshav Kfar Hess	Palestinian militant	1		
November 27, 2001	Shooting attack	Afula	Palestinian militant	2		
November 27, 2001	Grenade and shooting attack	Gaza	Palestinian militant	1		
November 29, 2001	Pardes Hanna bus bombing	Pardes Hanna-Karkur	Islamic Jihad	3		
December 1, 2001	Ben Yehuda Street Bombing	Downtown Jerusalem	Hamas	11		
December 2, 2001	Haifa bus 16 suicide bombing	Haifa	Hamas	15		
December 2, 2001	Shooting attack	Elei Sinai	Hamas	1		
December 12, 2001	2001 Immanuel bus attack	Emmanuel, Samaria	Hamas and Fatah	11		
December 17, 2001	Murder	Samaria	Three residents of Jaba	1		
January 15, 2002	Shooting attack	Givat Ze'ev	Fatah's Al-Aqsa Brigade	1		
January 18, 2002	Bat Mitzvah massacre	Hadera	al-Aqsa Martyrs' Brigades	6		
January 22, 2002	Shooting attack	Jerusalem	Fatah's Al-Aqsa Brigade	2		
January 25, 2002	2002 Tel Aviv outdoor mall bombing	Tel Aviv	Hamas	0		
January 27, 2002	Jaffa Street bombing	Jerusalem	al-Aqsa Martyrs' Brigades	1		
February 6, 2002	Home invasion & Shooting attack	Moshav Hamra	Fatah and Hamas	3		
February 8, 2002	Stabbing attack	Jerusalem	Four Palestinians	1		
February 16, 2002	Karnei Shomron Mall suicide bombing	Karnei Shomron	Popular Front for the Liberation of Palestine	3		
February 18, 2002	Shooting attack	Gush Katif	Fatah's Al-Aqsa Brigade	3		
February 21, 2002	Shooting attack	Entrance to Baka al-Garbiya	Palestinian militant	1		
February 22, 2002	Drive-by Shooting attack	Atarot-Givat Ze'ev	Fatah	1		
February 25, 2002	Shooting attack	Between Tekoa and Nokdim	Fatah Al-Aqsa Brigades	2		
February 27, 2002	Shooting attack	North of Jerusalem	Two Fatah groups	1		
March 2, 2002	Yeshivat Beit Yisrael massacre	Beit Yisrael, Jerusalem	Fatah al-Aqsa Martyrs' Brigades	11		
March 3, 2002	Shooting attack	Samaria	Fatah al-Aqsa Martyrs' Brigades	10		
March 5, 2002	Shooting attack	Tel Aviv	Fatah al-Aqsa Martyrs' Brigades	3		
March 5, 2002	Shooting attack	Bethlehem	Fatah al-Aqsa Martyrs' Brigades	1		
March 5, 2002	2nd Egged bus 823 bombing	Afula	Islamic Jihad	1		
March 7, 2002	Atzmona Massacre	Gush Katif	Hamas	5		
March 9, 2002	Shooting & Grenade attack	Netanya	Fatah Al-Aqsa Brigades	2		
March 9, 2002	Café Moment bombing	Rehavia, Jerusalem	Hamas	11		
March 12, 2002	Shooting attack	Kiryat Sefer checkpoint	Palestinian militants	1		
March 12, 2002	Matzuva attack	Shlomi–Matzuva road	Islamic Jihad	6		
March 17, 2002	Shooting attack	Kfar Sava	Palestinian gunman	1		
March 20, 2002	Umm al-Fahm bus bombing	Umm al-Fahm	Islamic Jihad	7		
March 21, 2002	King George Street bombing	King George Street, Jerusalem	al-Aqsa Martyrs Brigades	3		
March 24, 2002	Shooting attack	Northwest of Ramallah	Palestinian militant	1		
March 24, 2002	Shooting attack	South of Hebron	Palestinian militant	1		
March 27, 2002	Passover massacre	Park Hotel, Netanya	Hamas	30		
March 28, 2002	Family killed in their home	Elon Moreh	Hamas	4		
March 29, 2002	Stabbing attack	Gaza	Palestinian militant	2		
March 29, 2002	Kiryat HaYovel supermarket bombing	Kiryat HaYovel	Hamas	2		
March 30, 2002	Allenby Street coffee shop bombing	Tel Aviv	Al-Aqsa Martyrs' Brigades	1		
March 31, 2002	Matza restaurant suicide bombing	Haifa	Hamas	16		
April 1, 2002	Jerusalem roadblock bombing	Jerusalem	Al-Aqsa Martyrs' Brigades	1		
April 10, 2002	Yagur Junction bombing	Yagur Junction	Hamas	8		
April 12, 2002	2002 Mahane Yehuda Market bombing	Mahane Yehuda Market, Jerusalem	al-Aqsa Martyrs' Brigades	6		
April 27, 2002	Shooting	Adora	Hamas and the PFLP	4		
May 7, 2002	Sheffield Club bombing	Rishon LeZion	Hamas	16		
May 12, 2002	Shooting attack at point-blank range	Rafah	Palestinian laborer	1		
May 19, 2002	Netanya Market bombing	Netanya	Hamas and PFLP	3		
May 22, 2002	Rothchild Street downtown pedestrian mall suicide bombing	Rishon Lezion	Palestinian militant	2		
May 27, 2002	Petah Tikvah Mall bombing	Petah Tikvah	Al-Aqsa Martyrs' Brigades	2		
May 28, 2002	Shooting attack	Itamar	Palestinian gunman	3		
May 28, 2002	Shooting attack	Ramallah	Al-Aqsa Martyrs' Brigades	1		
June 5, 2002	Megiddo Junction bus bombing	Megiddo Junction	Islamic Jihad	17		
June 8, 2002	Teenager shot	Ofra	Palestinian militants	1		
June 8, 2002	Man and pregnant woman gunned down	Carmei Tzur	Hamas	2		
June 11, 2002	2002 Herzliya shawarma restaurant bombing	Herzliya	Al-Aqsa Martyrs' Brigades	1		
June 18, 2002	Patt junction bus bombing	Jerusalem	Hamas	19		
June 19, 2002	French Hill attacks	Jerusalem	al-Aqsa Martyrs' Brigades	7		
June 20, 2002	Itamar attack (2002)	Itamar	Popular Front for the Liberation of Palestine	5		
July 16, 2002	2002 Immanuel bus attack	Immanuel, Samaria	Palestinian militants	9		
July 17, 2002	Neve Shaanan Street bombing	Neve Shaanan, Tel Aviv	Islamic Jihad	5		
July 25, 2002	Shooting attack	Alei Zahav	Al-Aqsa Martyrs' Brigades	1		
July 26, 2002	Shooting attack	South of Hebron	Al-Aqsa Martyrs' Brigades	4		
July 30, 2002	Two men shot	Jama'in	Al-Aqsa Martyrs' Brigades	2		
July 31, 2002	Hebrew University massacre	Hebrew University of Jerusalem	Hamas	9		
August 1, 2002	Shooting attack	West of Tullkarem	Palestinian militants	1		
August 4, 2002	Two men shot	Jerusalem	Al-Aqsa Martyrs' Brigades	2		
August 4, 2002	Meron Junction Bus 361 attack	Northern Israel, near Safed	Hamas	9		
August 5, 2002	Shooting	Ramallah-Nablus road	The Martyrs of the Palestinian Popular Army	2		
August 10, 2002	Shooting attack	Moshav Mechora	Al-Aqsa Martyrs' Brigades	1		
September 18, 2002	Shooting attack	Body found in Palestinian village east of Jerusalem	Palestinian militants	1		
September 18, 2002	Shooting attack	Near Mavo Dotan	Al-Aqsa Martyrs' Brigades	1		
September 19, 2002	Allenby Street bus bombing	Tel Aviv	Hamas	6		
September 23, 2002	Shooting attack	Hebron	Palestinian militants	1		
October 8, 2002	Shooting attack	Hebron	Hamas	1		
October 10, 2002	Dan bus No. 87 suicide bombing	Geha highway	Hamas	1		
October 21, 2002	Egged bus 841 suicide bombing	Wadi Ara	Islamic Jihad	14		
October 29, 2002	Shooting attack	Northern Samaria	Al-Aqsa Martyrs' Brigades	3		
November 4, 2002	2002 Kfar Sava suicide bombing	Kfar Sava	Islamic Jihad	2		
November 6, 2002	Shooting attack	Pe'at Sadeh	Hamas	2		
November 10, 2002	Sirhan Sirhan Kibbutz shooting attack	Metzer	Fatah Al-Aqsa Martyrs' Brigades	5		
November 15, 2002	2002 Hebron ambush	Hebron	Palestinian Jerusalem Brigades	12		
November 18, 2002	Shooting attack	Near Rimonim	Palestinian gunman	1		
November 21, 2002	Kiryat Menachem bus bombing	Kiryat Menahem, Jerusalem	Hamas	11		
November 28, 2002	2002 Beit She'an attack	Beit She'an	Fatah al-Aqsa Martyrs' Brigades	6		
November 28, 2002	2002 Mombasa attacks	Mombasa, Kenya	Al-Qaeda	13 (3 Israelis)		
December 20, 2002	Shooting attack	Kissufim corridor road	Islamic Jihad	1		
December 27, 2002	Murder	Otniel	Islamic Jihad	4		
January 2, 2003	Elderly man killed and mutilated	Jordan Valley	The Fatah Al-Aqsa Brigades	1		
January 5, 2003	Tel Aviv central bus station massacre	Southern Tel Aviv	Fatah al-Aqsa Martyrs' Brigades	23		
January 12, 2003	Shooting attack	Moshav Gadish	Islamic Jihad	1		
January 17, 2003	Shooting attack	Kiryat Arba	Hamas	1		
March 5, 2003	Haifa bus 37 suicide bombing	Carmel section, Haifa	Hamas	17		
March 7, 2003	Murder	Kiryat Arba	Hamas	2		
March 19, 2003	Shooting attack	Northern Samaria	The Fatah Al-Aqsa Brigades	1		
April 13, 2003	Murder	Ben Shemen forest	Palestinian militants	1		
April 15, 2003	Shooting attack	Karni industrial zone crossing	Hamas	2		
April 24, 2003	2003 Kfar Sava suicide bombing	Kfar Sava	The Fatah Al-Aqsa Martyrs Brigade and the PLFP	1		
April 30, 2003	Mike's Place suicide bombing	Tel Aviv	Hamas and Al Aqsa Martyrs Brigades	3		
May 4, 2003	Stabbing attack	Rosh Ha'ayin	Palestinian militant	1		
May 5, 2003	Shooting attack	Samaria	The Fatah Al-Aqsa Brigades	1		
May 11, 2003	Shooting attack	North of Jerusalem	Fatah and the PFLP	1		
May 17, 2003	Suicide bombing	Hebron	Hamas	2		
May 18, 2003	2003 French Hill suicide bombing	French Hill, Jerusalem	Hamas	7		
May 19, 2003	Afula mall bombing	Afula	Islamic Jihad and the Al Aqsa Martyrs Brigades	3		
June 5, 2003	Man and teenager stabbed and beaten to death	Jerusalem	Palestinian militants	2		
June 11, 2003	Davidka Square bus bombing	Downtown Jerusalem	Hamas	17		
June 12, 2003	Shooting attack	Northern Samaria	Al-Aqsa Martyrs' Brigades	1		
June 17, 2003	Shooting attack	Near the Kibbutz Eyal junction	Al-Aqsa Martyrs' Brigades and the Popular Front for the Liberation of Palestine - General Command	1		
June 19, 2003	2003 Beit Shean suicide bombing	South of Beit Shean	Islamic Jihad	1		
June 20, 2003	Shooting attack	Near Ofra, north of Ramallah	Hamas	1		
June 26, 2003	Shooting attack	Baka al-Garbiyeh	Al-Aqsa Martyrs' Brigades	1		
July 7, 2003	Suicide bombing	Moshav Kfar Yavetz	Islamic Jihad	1		
July 15, 2003	Stabbing attack	Tel Aviv	Al-Aqsa Martyrs' Brigades	1		
August 10, 2003	Shrapnel from anti-aircraft shell	Shlomi	Hezbollah	1		
August 12, 2003	2003 Rosh Ha'ayin suicide bombing	Rosh Ha'ayin	Palestinian terrorist	1		
August 12, 2003	2003 Ariel suicide bombing	Ariel	Palestinian terrorist	2		
August 19, 2003	Shmuel HaNavi bus bombing	Shmuel HaNavi, Jerusalem	Hamas	23		
August 29, 2003	Shooting attack	Northeast of Ramallah	Al-Aqsa Martyrs' Brigades	1		
September 9, 2003	Tzrifin bus stop attack	Tzrifin	Hamas	9		
September 9, 2003	Café Hillel bombing	Jerusalem	Hamas	7		
September 26, 2003	Shooting attack	Negohot, south of Hebron	Islamic Jihad	2		
October 4, 2003	Maxim restaurant suicide bombing	Haifa	Islamic Jihad	21		
December 25, 2003	Geha Interchange bus stop bombing	Geha Interchange	Popular Front for the Liberation of Palestine	4		
January 13, 2004	Shooting attack	Samaria	Fatah al-Aqsa Martyrs' Brigades	1		
January 14, 2004	Liberty Bell Park bus bombing	Erez Crossing	Hamas and the Al Aqsa Martyrs Brigades	4		
January 29, 2004	Jerusalem bus 19 suicide bombing	Rehavia, Jerusalem	Fatah al-Aqsa Martyrs' Brigades	11		
February 22, 2004	Liberty Bell Park bus bombing	Liberty Bell Park	Fatah al-Aqsa Martyrs' Brigades	8		
February 27, 2004	Shooting attack	Lahav-Ashkelon road	Al-Aqsa Martyrs' Brigade and the PFLP	2		
March 14, 2004	Ashdod Port massacre	Port of Ashdod	Hamas and Fatah al-Aqsa Martyrs' Brigades	10		
March 19, 2004	Shooting attack	French Hill, Jerusalem	Al-Aqsa Martyrs' Brigade	1		
April 3, 2004	Shooting attack outside his home	Avnei Hefetz	Hamas	1		
May 2, 2004	Murder of Tali Hatuel and her four daughters	Gaza Strip	Islamic Jihad and Fatah	5		
June 28, 2004	Man and child killed by a Qassam rocket	Sderot	Hamas	2		
June 29, 2004	Shooting attack	Beit Rima	Al-Aqsa Martyrs' Brigades	1		
July 4, 2004	Shooting attack	Yabad	Al-Aqsa Martyrs' Brigades	1		
August 13, 2004	Shooting attack	Itamar	Al-Aqsa Martyrs' Brigades	1		
August 31, 2004	Beersheba massacre	Rager Boulevard, Beersheba	Hamas	16		
September 24, 2004	Mortar attack	Gush Katif	Palestinian militants	1		
September 29, 2004	Qassam rocket attack	Sderot	Hamas	2		
September 30, 2004	Shooting attack	Nissanit	Hamas	1		
October 7, 2004	2004 Sinai bombings	Sinai Peninsula	Palestinian group	34 (12 Israelis)		
November 1, 2004	Carmel Market bombing	Tel Aviv	Popular Front for the Liberation of Palestine	3		
December 21, 2004	Stabbing attack	Moshav Nehusha	Palestinian militants	1		
December 22, 2004	Stabbing attack	West of Hebron	Al-Aqsa Martyrs' Brigades	1		
January 2, 2005 critically wounded; January 11, 2005 died	Mortar attack	Erez Industrial Zone	Hamas	1		
January 12, 2005	Bombing	Near Morag	Islamic Jihad	1		
January 13, 2005	Karni border crossing attack	Karni Crossing	Hamas, the Al Aqsa Martyrs Brigades and the Popular Resistance Committees	6		
January 15, 2005	Qassam rocket attack	Sderot	Hamas	1		
January 18, 2005	2005 Gush Katif suicide bombing	Gush Katif	Hamas	1		
February 25, 2005	Stage Club bombing	Tel Aviv	Islamic Jihad	5		

== Palestinian non-combatant casualties ==
The following is a partial List of Palestinian civilian casualties in the Second Intifada. The portion of the killed since the beginning of the Second Intifada that were civilians is disputed. According to B'Tselem, in the decade from 27 September 2000 to 27 September 2010, 6,371 Palestinians were killed, at least 2,996 of whom did not participate in hostilities when they were killed.

A study conducted by Israel's International Institute for Counter-Terrorism (ICT) concluded that 1,099 Israeli deaths from September 2000 – September 2002 were non-combatants, which was 35 percent of total Israeli deaths. According to the study, 103 (9 percent) were female and 996 (91 percent) were male. Professor and historian Benny Morris came to a similar conclusion in his 2009 retrospective book One States, Two States, saying that about one third of the Palestinian deaths had been civilians.

The portion of the 4,281 Palestinians killed since the beginning of the Second Intifada that were civilians is disputed. According to the Israeli human rights organization B'tselem, 2,038 were civilians. Israeli historian Benny Morris estimated that about one third of the Palestinian deaths had been civilians.

Another 609 Palestinian fatalities were inflicted by other Palestinians.

Date	Incident	Location	Responsible party	Deaths	Injuries	References
September 30, 2000	Shooting during demonstration	Next to Ramallah	Israeli security forces	2		
September 30, 2000	Shooting incident	Next to Ayosh Junction, Ramallah and al-Bira district	Israeli security forces	1		
October 1, 2000	Helicopter gunship attack	Nablus	Israeli Air Force	2		
October 1, 2000	Shooting incident	Ayosh Junction, Ramallah and al-Bira district	Israeli security forces	1		
October 1, 2000	Shooting incident	Netzarim Junction, Deir al-Balah	Israeli security forces	1		
October 1 - October 9, 2000	October 2000 events	Northern Israel	Israel Police	1		
October 2, 2000	Shooting incident	Nablus	Israeli security forces	1		
October 2, 2000	Shooting incident	Tulkarem	Israeli security forces	1		
October 4, 2000	Shooting incident	Netzarim Junction, Deir al-Balah district	Israeli security forces	1		
October 6, 2000	Shooting incident during settler riot	East Jerusalem	Israeli security forces	1		
October 7, 2000	Shooting incident	Gaza City	Israeli security forces	1		
October 7, 2000	Shooting attack during settler riot	Bidya, Salfit district	Israeli settlers	1		
October 11, 2000	Shooting incident	Tulkarem	Israeli security forces	1		
October 13, 2000	Crossfire shooting incident	Al-Fawar camp, Hebron	Israel Defense Forces	1		
October 16, 2000	Shooting incident	Bethlehem	Israeli security forces	1		
October 16, 2000	Shooting during demonstration	Nablus	Israeli security forces	1		
October 17, 2000	Shooting incident	Beit Furik, Nablus district	Unknown	1		
October 18, 2000	Shooting during demonstration	Rafah	Israeli security forces	1		
October 20, 2000	Shooting during demonstration	Ayosh Junction, Ramallah and al-Bira district	Israeli security forces	1		
October 20, 2000	Shooting during demonstration	Qalqilya	Israeli security forces	1		
October 20, 2000	Shooting during demonstration	Salfit	Israeli security forces	1		
October 20, 2000	Shooting incident	Tulkarem	Israeli security forces	1		
October 20, 2000	Shooting incident	Kafr Qalil, Nablus district	Israeli security forces	1		
October 21, 2000	Shooting during demonstration	Kfar Darom, Deir al-Balah district	Israeli security forces	1		
October 21, 2000	Shooting during demonstration	al-Bireh	Israeli security forces	1		
October 22, 2000	Teenager shot during demonstration	Kfar Darom, Deir al-Balah district	Israeli security forces	1		
October 22, 2000	Child shot during demonstration	North Gaza district	Israeli security forces	1		
October 23, 2000	Civilian shot in his home	Hebron	Israel Defense Forces	1		
October 24, 2000	Teenager shot	Khan Yunis	Israeli security forces	1		
October 24, 2000	Teenage bystander shot during clashes	Khan Yunis	Israeli security forces	1		
November 11, 2000	Man killed while working	Shalala Street, Hebron	Israel Defense Forces	1		
November 14, 2000	Man killed by stone-throwing	Kfar Malik, Ramallah and al-Bira district	Israeli settlers	1		
November 16, 2000	Man shot near checkpoint	Beit Umar	Israel Defense Forces	1		
December 31, 2000	Child bystander shot	Haret es-Sheikh neighborhood, Hebron	Israel Defense Forces	1		
January 5, 2001	Woman shot in her home	Hebron	Israel Defense Forces	1		
February 17, 2001	Workers on a collective farm killed in crossfire	Abu Snainah neighborhood, Hebron	Israel Defense Forces	2		
February 17, 2001	Driver caught killed in crossfire	Abu Snainah neighborhood, Hebron	Israel Defense Forces	1		
May 1, 2001	Baby killed by mortar fire	Khan Yunis	Israel Defense Forces	1		
June 13, 2001	Man shot while driving with his family	Next to Hizma, al-Quds district	Israelis	1		
July 7, 2001	Boy killed in tank fire	Rafah	Israel Defense Forces	1		
July 19, 2001	Men killed in drive-by shooting attack	South of Hebron	Israeli settlers	3		
August 29, 2001	Men killed in drive-by shooting attack	Northeastern Jerusalem	Israeli settlers	1		
December 2, 2001	Man shot at the bank	East Jerusalem	Bank security guard	1		
March 4, 2002	Khalil Suleiman killed when his ambulance was attacked	Jenin	Israeli Defense Forces	1	2-5	
April 1, 2002	Workers killed in an ambush on their truck	Next to Kocha Hashahar, Ramallah and al-Bira district	Israeli settlers	2		
April 2002	Battle of Jenin	Jenin	Israel Defense Forces	22		
April 20, 2002	Entire family killed in Home demolition	Nablus	Israel Defense Forces	5		
June 21, 2002	Man shot during settler riot	Huwara, Nablus district	Israeli settlers	1		
July 12, 2002	Death of Imad Abu Zahra	Jenin	Israel Defense Forces	1		
July 22, 2002	Assassination of Salah Shahade	Gaza City	Israel Defense Forces	14 (+1 militant)		
July 29, 2002	Teenager shot in settler attack on Palestinian neighborhood	Hebron	Israeli settlers	1		
October 6, 2002	Young man shot while harvesting olives	'Aqraba, Nablus district	Israeli settlers	1		
October 11, 2002	Killing of Shaden Abu-Hijleh	Nablus	Israel Defense Forces	1		
January 25, 2003	Man shot in field	Next to Budrus, Ramallah and al-Bira district	Not specified	1		
February 3, 2003	An elderly woman killed in home demolition	al-Maghazi refugee camp, Deir al-Balah district	Israel Defense Forces	1		
February 5, 2003	Nurses killed by helicopter gunfire in medical clinic	Al-Wafa Hospital, Gaza City	Israel Defense Forces	2		
March 3, 2003	Civilians killed in invasion of refugee camp	Jabalia refugee camp, Gaza	Israel Defense Forces	6		
March 4, 2003	Elderly shepherd killed	South of Gaza City	Israel Defense Forces	1		
April 4, 2003	Man shot near settlement	Peza'el, Jericho	Settlement security officer	1		
April 19, 2003	Killing of Nazeh Darwazeh	Nablus	Israel Defense Forces	1		
June 12, 2003	Civilians killed in assassination of Yasser Muhammed Salah Taha	Gaza City	Israeli security forces	4 (+1 militant)		
December 1, 2003	Man killed in crossfire	Next to Hebron	Israeli security guards	1		
March 3, 2004	Pregnant woman killed	Bureij refugee camp	Israel Defense Forces	1		
September 15, 2004	Man shot while driving	Road 557 in the West Bank	Israeli settler	1		
September 27, 2004	Man shot while driving his taxi	Salem, Nablus district	Israeli settler	1		
October 4, 2004	Shooting of Iyman Hams	Gaza Strip	Israel Defense Forces	1		

== Foreigner casualties in the Second Intifada ==
During the course of the second intifada, a total of 64 foreign citizens were killed.

=== Casualties by Israel ===
- Iain Hook – English UNRWA aid project manager shot and killed by an IDF soldier, who mistook a cellphone in his hand for a gun or grenade, in Jenin, November 22, 2002.
- Rachel Corrie – American ISM activist killed in an IDF bulldozer during her protest of the demolition of a Palestinian home on March 16, 2003.
- Tom Hurndall – English ISM volunteer fatally shot by an IDF sniper in Gaza, April 11, 2003.
- James Miller – Welsh film-maker shot and killed by the IDF in Gaza, May 2, 2003.

=== Casualties by Palestinians ===
- Constantin Straturula, 52, of Romania – Killed in a Palestinian bomb attack May 10, 2001.
- Virgil Martinescu, 29, of Romania – Killed in a Palestinian bomb attack May 10, 2001.
- Aleksei Lupalu, 16, of the Ukraine – Killed in a Palestinian suicide bombing June 2, 2001.
- Sergei Panchenko, 20, Ukraine. – Killed in a Palestinian suicide bombing June 2, 2001
- Giora Balash, 60, from São Paulo, Brazil – Killed in a Palestinian suicide bombing August 9, 2001.
- Shoshana Yehudit (Judy) Greenbaum, 31, from Passaic, New Jersey, United States – Killed in a Palestinian suicide bombing August 9, 2001.
- Rosaria Reyes, 42, Filipino citizen – Killed in a Palestinian suicide bombing December 2, 2001.
- Avraham (Avi) Boaz, 71, American citizen – Kidnapped at a PA security checkpoint in Beit Jala on January 15, 2001; bullet-ridden body found in Beit Sahur.
- Catherine Berruex, 25, of Switzerland and Turgut Cengiz Toytunç of Turkey, observers at the TIPH - killed in Hebron by Islamic Jihad March 26, 2002
- Perla Hermele, 79, of Stockholm, Sweden – Killed in a Palestinian suicide bombing March 27, 2002.
- Zuhila Hushi, 47, Chinese citizen, of Gilo – Killed in a Palestinian suicide bombing April 12, 2002.
- Lin Chin Mai, 34, Chinese citizen – Killed in a Palestinian suicide bombing April 12, 2002.
- Chai Zin Chang, 32, Chinese citizen – Killed in a Palestinian suicide bombing April 12, 2002.
- Tatiana Igelski, 43, of Moldova – Killed in a Palestinian suicide bombing June 19, 2002.
- Adrian Andres, 30, of Romania – Killed in a Palestinian suicide bombing July 17, 2002.
- Li Bin, 33, of China – Killed in a Palestinian suicide bombing July 17, 2002.
- Janis Ruth Coulter, 36, of New York (US) – Killed by a Palestinian remotely detonated concealed bomb July 31, 2002. It was carried out by an East Jerusalem-based Hamas cell whose members are serving multiple life sentences in Israeli prisons for that attack and others.
- David Gritz, 24, of Massachusetts (US-France) – Killed by a Palestinian remotely detonated concealed bomb July 31, 2002. It was carried out by an East Jerusalem-based Hamas cell whose members are serving multiple life sentences in Israeli prisons for that attack and others.
- Marla Bennett, 24, of California (US) – Killed by a Palestinian remotely detonated concealed bomb July 31, 2002. It was carried out by an East Jerusalem-based Hamas cell whose members are serving multiple life sentences in Israeli prisons for that attack and others.
- Benjamin Blutstein, 25, of Pennsylvania (US) – Killed by a Palestinian remotely detonated concealed bomb July 31, 2002. It was carried out by an East Jerusalem-based Hamas cell whose members are serving multiple life sentences in Israeli prisons for that attack and others.
- Dina Carter, 37, of Jerusalem (US) – Killed by a Palestinian remotely detonated concealed bomb July 31, 2002. It was carried out by an East Jerusalem-based Hamas cell whose members are serving multiple life sentences in Israeli prisons for that attack and others.
- Adelina Kononen, 37, of the Philippines – Killed in a Palestinian suicide bombing August 4, 2002.
- Rebecca Roga, 40, of the Philippines – Killed in a Palestinian suicide bombing August 4, 2002.
- Jonathan (Yoni) Jesner, 19, of Glasgow, Scotland – Killed in a Palestinian suicide bombing September 19, 2002.
- Mircea Varga, 25, a tourist from Romania – Killed in a Palestinian suicide bombing November 21, 2002.
- Ion (Nelu) Nicolae, 34, of Romania – Killed in a Palestinian suicide bombing January 5, 2003.
- Mihai Sabau, 38, of Romania – Killed in a Palestinian suicide bombing January 5, 2003.
- Li Peizhong, 41, of China – Killed in a Palestinian suicide bombing January 5, 2003.
- Steven Arthur Cromwell, 43, of Ghana – Killed in a Palestinian suicide bombing January 5, 2003.
- Krassimir Mitkov Angelov, 32, of Bulgaria – Killed in a Palestinian suicide bombing January 5, 2003.
- Ivan Gaptoniak, 46, of Ukraine – Killed in a Palestinian suicide bombing January 5, 2003.
- Guo Aiping, 47, of China – Killed in a Palestinian suicide bombing January 5, 2003.
- Zhang Minmin, 50, of China – died of her injuries on January 13, 2003 from a Palestinian suicide bombing.
- Haile Abraha Hawki, 56, a foreign worker from Eritrea – Killed in a Palestinian suicide bombing June 11, 2003.
- Krastyu Radkov, 46, of Bulgaria – Killed in a Palestinian shooting attack June 30, 2003 west Jenin while driving a truck. Al-Aqsa Martyrs' Brigades claimed responsibility.
- Goldie Taubenfeld, 43, of New Square, New York – Killed in a Palestinian suicide bombing August 19, 2003.
- Shmuel Taubenfeld, 3 months, of New Square, New York – Killed in a Palestinian suicide bombing August 19, 2003.
- Maria Antonia Reslas, 39, of the Philippines – Killed in a Palestinian suicide bombing August 19, 2003.
- John Eric Branchizio, 37, of Texas – Killed by a Palestinian bomb October 15, 2003 in the Gaza Strip, along with two other American diplomatic personnel.
- John Martin Linde, Jr., 30, of Missouri – Killed by a Palestinian bomb October 15, 2003 in the Gaza Strip, along with two other American diplomatic personnel.
- Mark T. Parson, 31, of New York – Killed by a Palestinian bomb October 15, 2003 in the Gaza Strip, along with two other American diplomatic personnel.
- Patricia Ter'n Navarrete, 33, of Ecuador – Killed by a Palestinian terrorist in a shooting attack November 19, 2003, north of Eilat.
- Mehbere Kifile, 35, of Ethiopia – Killed in a Palestinian suicide bombing January 29, 2004.
- Weerachai Wongput, 37, from the Nong Han District of the northeastern province of Udon Thani in Thailand – Killed by shrapnel from mortar fire on June 21, 2004. Hamas claimed responsibility.
- Pratheep Nanongkham, 24, of Thailand – Killed when armed terrorists infiltrated the hothouse area of Kfar Darom in the central Gaza Strip on October 6, 2004. Hamas claimed responsibility.

== See also ==
- List of Israeli civilian casualties in the Second Intifada
- List of Palestinian suicide attacks
- Israeli casualties of war
