= Palestinian Center for Development and Media Freedoms =

Palestinian media rights organization

- المركز الفلسطيني للتنمية والحريات الإعلامية
- Abbreviation: MADA
- Formation: 2006
- Purpose: Promote freedom of information and expression in Palestine
- Headquarters: Ramallah, Palestine
- Director: Mousa Rimawi
- Website: MADAcenter.org

Palestinian Center for Development and Media Freedoms (MADA) is a Palestinian non-governmental organization that promotes freedom of expression and information. It documents attacks and other press freedom violations against Palestinian journalists throughout Gaza and the West Bank, releases reports on freedom of the press issues, and advocates for journalists. Based in Ramallah, MADA was founded in 2006 and has had special consultative status with the United Nations Economic and Social Council (ECOSOC) since 2016.

== Organization ==
MADA was founded in 2006 to promote freedom of expression and information in Palestine. It is headquartered in Ramallah and works throughout Gaza and the West Bank. According to co-founder and director Mousa Rimawi, MADA was established in response to escalating attacks on Palestinian journalists. MADA documents violations against the Palestinian press by the Israeli government, the Palestinian Authority (PA), the Hamas authorities, and others. Their reporting has been cited by human rights organizations like Human Rights Watch, Amnesty International, and Al-Haq, as well as news agencies like Deutsche Welle, AFP, Al-Jazeera, and The Times of Israel. MADA also provides legal advice and trainings to journalists. As of 2016, MADA has special consultative status with the United Nations Economic and Social Council (ECOSOC).

== Activities ==
In 2010, a Palestinian journalist was arrested by the PA for a Facebook post comparing Mahmoud Abbas to a TV show character who collaborated with French colonial authorities. MADA condemned the arrest and noted that the journalist had not created the post but had only been tagged in it. After a Palestinian court found the journalist guilty of violating an old law against insulting the king, Abbas pardoned him. MADA condemned the ruling as a violation of freedom of expression and stated: "We don't have a king, we have a president".

With support from DCAF, MADA formed a committee of legal experts to propose improvements to an existing draft law guaranteeing access to information. MADA also launched the "Information is power" campaign, including billboards and workshops advocating for the law to be passed. The updated draft law appeared to have support from Prime Minister Rami Hamdallah and was scheduled to be discussed by the legislature in 2014, but as of 2023, it has not been passed.

During the 2014 Gaza War, MADA director Mousa Rimawi condemned the Israeli killing of Palestinian journalists, stating that Israel was trying to "prevent the journalists from covering the crimes that are committed by Israel against [the] Palestinian people." He predicted that Israel would continue to kill Palestinian journalists unless the international community compelled it to stop. In total, MADA reported that 17 journalists had been killed, 27 had been injured, while 20 media outlets and 37 homes of journalists had been damaged in the war. MADA estimated that 77% of Israeli killings of journalists in Palestine in the previous 15 years had occurred during the 2014 war, representing an upward trend. Palestinian authorities had also increased repression of press freedoms in 2014, according to MADA. Later that year, MADA reported that over 80% of Palestinian journalists self-censor and 68% had witnessed censorship of journalism. Rimawi pointed to Israeli censorship before the creation of the Palestinian Authority as the source of self-censorship but stated that censorship had also increased under the Palestinian Authority (PA).

MADA published "Social Media… A New Venue to Censor and Prosecute Journalists", a report about the Israeli and Palestinian governments' increasing surveillance of Palestinian journalists on social media, in 2016. MADA documented 70 press freedom violations related to social media between January 2014 and May 2016, mostly by Palestinian officials. The violations included arrests, questioning, and forcing journalists to disclose their passwords. Additionally, MADA reported that social media sites had censored Palestinian content at the request of the Israeli government. Around the same time, Israeli minister Ayelet Shaked stated that social media companies were deleting almost all of the Palestinian content that the Israeli government had requested them to remove.

In June and July of 2017, the PA arrested multiple journalists in the West Bank. Additionally, president Mahmoud Abbas issued the Electronic Cybercrime Act, which the PA said was necessary to combat crime on the internet. It was criticized by MADA, Amnesty International, and other rights groups as criminalizing freedom of expression on the internet in the West Bank. MADA reported that the PA blocked about 29 websites in June, most of which were connected to Abbas's political rivals, such as the Quds News Network. Rimawi denounced the arrests as illegal and stated that the PA's violations of press freedom had surpassed Israel's. DW Akademie worked with MADA to educate Palestinians about the law.

In a 2018 interview, Rimawi spoke about the emotional strain of documenting the killings of Palestinian journalists, including Ali Shehda Abu Afash, Yaser Murtaja, and Fadel Shanaa, but stated that MADA was determined to do its work, despite the difficulties. He said: "Only when we strengthen freedom of expression can our society really develop."

After PA security forces killed the activist Nizar Banat in June 2021, protests broke out in the West Bank. Compared to the 6 Palestinian press freedom violations reported in May and the 3 in April, MADA reported 69 violations in June. The violations included assaults, arrests, threats, breaking equipment, and preventing coverage. MADA attributed the increase to the PA attempting to stop journalists from reporting on the protests.

During the Gaza war, MADA reported an increase in Israeli attacks on Palestinian journalists in both the West Bank and Gaza.

== See also ==
- Violence against Palestinian journalists
- History of Palestinian journalism
