= List of Palestinian journalists =

This is a list of notable Palestinian journalists.

== List of journalists ==
- Ashraf Amra, freelance photojournalist
- Mohammed Salama, photojournalist from Gaza
- Hind Khoudary, journalist based in the Gaza Strip
- Mahmoud Al-Karmi, writer, scholar of Arabic language, poet, and political journalist
- Mahmoud Labadi, journalist, writer and politician
- Medo Halimy, social media personality and blogger
- Motaz Azaiza, photojournalist from Gaza
- Noor Harazeen, journalist and filmmaker
- Plestia Alaqad, journalist and poet
- Wael Al-Dahdouh, journalist and the bureau chief of Al Jazeera in Gaza City
- Shireen Abu Akleh, journalist who worked as a reporter for 25 years for Al Jazeera, before she was killed by Israeli forces
- Imad Abu Zahra, freelance photojournalist
- Dareen Abughaida, broadcast journalist
- Ziad Abuzayyad, lawyer, journalist, and politician
- Muna Hawwa, blogger and journalist
- Abdulrahman thaher, journalist and director

== See also ==
- History of Palestinian journalism
- Killing of journalists in the Gaza war
- List of journalists killed in the Gaza war
- List of journalists killed during the Israeli–Palestinian conflict
