= Hamza Murtaja =

Palestinian journalist (1986–2026)

- حمزه عبد الرحمن مصطفى مرتجى
- Born: Hamza Abdul Rahman Mustafa Murtaja; 1991; Gaza City, Gaza Strip
- Died: 20 August 2024 (aged 32–33); Gaza City, Gaza Strip
- Education: Islamic University of Gaza
- Occupation: Journalist
- Children: Abdel Rahman (by adoption), Omar Murtaja, Yasser Murtaja

Hamza Abdul Rahman Mustafa Murtaja (1991 – 20 August 2024) was a Palestinian freelance journalist. In 2024, he was killed by an Israeli airstrike that targeted the Mustafa Hafez School in Gaza City during the Gaza war. He is the brother of Yaser Murtaja, who was killed by Israeli forces in 2018.

== Background ==
Hamza was born in 1991 in Gaza City. He attended the Islamic University of Gaza and majored in Social Work, where he graduated in 2014. Hamza worked as both a photographer and a journalist for several media outlets. Hamza was a co-founder of Ain Media productions, his brother's company. He was also co-owner and camera operator for the privately owned Record Media production company.

After the killing of his brother Yaser Murtaja by Israeli security forces during the 2018–2019 Gaza border protests, Hamza married his brother's widow and adopted his son, Abdel Rahman.

Hamza fathered two children before his death, Omar and Yasser, who was named after his brother.

== Death ==
On 20 August 2024, Hamza was filming a TV report about the displaced people taking shelter in the Mustafa Hafez school in the al-Rimal neighborhood, west of Gaza City. While filming the report, Israeli forces conducted an airstrike on the elementary school, killing Hamza and eleven others in the school, as well as injuring more than 15 people.

=== Response and tributes ===
In a press statement on Tuesday, the GMO (Government Media Office in Gaza) announced Hamza's death, and condemned in the strongest terms the Israeli deliberate targeting and killing of Palestinian journalists.

The Israeli military claimed that that school where Hamza was killed was being used as a ''Hamas command-and-control center''.

UNESCO Director-General Audrey Azoulay condemned the killing and called for a full and transparent investigation.
