= Murtaja =

Murtaja may refer to:

- Murtaja (1890 icebreaker), a steam-powered icebreaker built in 1890 that was the first Finnish state-owned icebreaker
- Murtaja (1959 icebreaker), a diesel-electric icebreaker built in 1959 and broken up in 1986
- Murtaja Baseer (born 1932), Bangladeshi painter
- Yaser Murtaja (1987/1988–2018), Palestinian video journalist and photographer from the Gaza Strip
