= Nazeh Darwazi =

Palestinian TV camera operator (ca. 1958–1961 – 2003)

- Born: Between 1958-1961; Nablus, West Bank
- Died: 19 April 2003; Nablus, West Bank
- Cause of death: shot dead by the IDF while working as journalist for Associated Press
- Occupations: still photographer, TV camera operator
- Years active: 2 years
- Employer: Associated Press Television Network (APTN)
- Partner: Raeda Darwazi
- Children: 5

Nazeh Adel Darwazi (also spelled Darwazeh; died 19 April 2003), was a Palestinian freelance cameraman for the US news agency Associated Press Television Network (APTN) and Palestinian state television when he was killed in Nablus in the West Bank while reporting by a bullet in the head fired by an Israeli soldier from a distance of about 20 yards (6.9 m) after having pointed his weapon at group of journalists.

Darwazi was one of seven journalists to be killed while reporting on the Second Intifada (2000-2005).

== Life ==
Nazeh Darwazi is believed to have been born between 1958 and 1961; various accounts of his age were reported. He was born and raised in Nablus, where he lived with his wife, Raeda, and their five children.

In 1988, when cameramen were needed to film the Palestinian Intifada, the uprisings against Israeli control and occupation, from the inside, Darwazeh ran a photo and video studio in Nablus. At the time of the first Intifada, there was no Palestinian television channel, and the clashes, which captured the world's attention, were filmed by foreigners, often even Israelis. He then entered the world of television and film production. Darwazi joined an international project that would train young Palestinians for six months by having them film their own lives, the documentary film Palestinian Diaries: Chronicles of occupation (1991). As the Palestinians in the old city of Nablus where he lived were under perpetual curfew. His documentary was shot from windows and alleyways and offered an exceptional view of the events. Broadcast on British television, it has since been considered the most accurate reflection of the First Intifada (1987-1993). During the six months of filming, Nazeh Darwazi married. Darwazi survived the First Intifada, living in the Nablus casbah. He also survived numerous Israeli incursions into Nablus.

Darwazi worked for The Associated Press for two years. He was also a journalist for Palestinian television. After a few years of working as a professional television cameraman, he bought an apartment outside the old city of Nablus, not far from An-Najah National University. Darwazi's fried and colleague Daoud Kuttab, wrote about him as a soft-spoken man at peace with himself and all around him. Living in the casbah didn’t turn him to an Israeli hater. Darwazi met many Israeli and had excellent relationship with them.

== Death ==
Nazeh Darwazi was killed in Nablus, West Bank, in the occupied Palestinian territory of Israel. It is shown here relative to Jerusalem and Tel Aviv.

Eighteen Palestinians were injured by rubber bullets and live fire during clashes between Israeli troops and Palestinians throwing stones.

Nazeh Darwazi was covering the Passover clashes in Nablus for AP when he was killed. Darwazi was filming fights between Israeli troops and Palestinians in the central Casbah district (Old City), when he was shot through the back of his head by an Israeli soldier positioned behind a tank 6.9m away. Tony Loughran (ZeroRisk International), an independent investigator for APTN, has edited previous information on Wikipedia which stated that Nazeh was shot through his right eye from the front, and validated this during the course of his investigation in April 2003. He was wearing a yellow jacket marked "press" and was with a group of around six journalists covering fights between the group of Palestinians and Israeli soldiers. The journalists said their group had shouted in English and Hebrew making clear that they were with the media. Three people filmed the event, including the Reuters cameraman Hassan Titi, who witnessed and filmed the shooting. Another witness was Sami al-Assi, a cameraman with a local TV station. He testified "The Israelis shot him and aimed specifically at us".

Nazeh Darwazi’s body was wrapped in the Palestinian flag and carried from the Rafidyeh hospital by representatives of the Palestinian press. Those carrying Darwazi chanted against the occupation. They carried his body to the funeral, which was attended by over a thousand people. Darwazi was 42 years old and left behind his wife Raeda and five children ranging in age from 6 months to 9 years.

== Investigation ==
At first the Israeli army claimed they were under attack by armed Palestinians who had been throwing explosives, but witnesses testified a soldier shot Darwazi in cold blood without any exchange of fire.

Reporters Without Borders investigated the event and found that the army had not interviewed the eyewitnesses. The soldiers had been questioned, but nobody was punished. The Palestinian National Authority stated that Israel had "committed a war crime" by "opening fire on journalists and other civilians". ZeroRisk International & The Associated Press said two Palestinian cameramen, Hassan Titi from Reuters and Sami al-Assi from a Palestinian station, confirmed that they saw soldier take aim and fire at the journalists. Video footage taken by Reuters confirms a soldier kneeling by a tank pointing a rifle down the alley where the journalists were wearing yellow Press vests. Darwazeh fell to his death shortly after the soldier fired.

The Israeli investigation said that Israeli soldiers had been shot at before returning fire when Darwazi was killed. The Associated Press Television Network and ZeroRisk International report categorically disputed such a claim and has evidence to prove that the Islraeli soldier shot Nazeh as he turned to his right to film Palestinian children being taken to an ambulance.

== Context ==
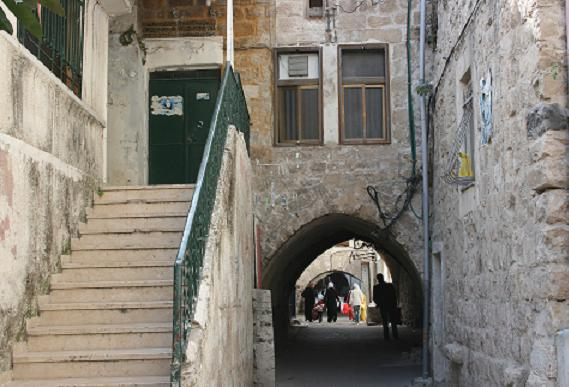
A street scene of the Old City of Nablus.

Some of the journalists who were killed during the Second Intifada (2000-2005) include Raffaele Ciriello, Italian; and Imad Abu Zahra and Issam Tillawi, who were both Palestinian. Two weeks after the Darwazi killing, James Miller was killed on 2 May 2003 by the Israeli armee while making a film about the Second Intifada.

Israeli troops arrested several Palestinians in Nablus on suspicion of a planning a potential suicide attack during Passover. Three of the four were arrested around the Old City; the fourth turned himself in at a military checkpoint. In Rafah, five Palestinians were killed by Israeli troops during a raid of a nearby refugee camp in the southern Gaza Strip. Twenty-seven people total were wounded in the raid. At the time, Palestinian leader, Yasir Arafat was in a dispute with his handpicked prime minister, Mahmoud Abbas, over the formation of a new government.

== Reaction ==
On 23 April 2003, in front of the International Red Cross headquarters in Al-Khalil district, a group of Palestinian journalists staged a sit-in to publicly declare their disgust with what happened. The Palestinian Authority accused the IDF of war crimes.

Reporters Without Borders, which is based in France, urged President Jacques Chirac to bring the issue of journalist security and safety up when he met with Israeli Moshe Katzav in 2004.

The Committee to Protect Journalists issued statement about Nazeh Darwazi's death. Joel Simon, CPJ, said, "We demand an immediate and thorough inquiry into the shooting death of Nazih Darwazeh and call on you to ensure that those responsible are swiftly brought to justice."

== See also ==
- List of journalists killed during the Israeli-Palestinian conflict

== Documentary ==
- Palestinian Diaries: Chronicles of occupation. 1991, 60 min. Original Format: VHS. In Nablus: Nazeh's diary, in Khader: Suher's diary, in Rafah: Abdel Salam's diary. Glimpses of real life in the occupied territories of the West Bank and of the Gaza Strip, as seen through the camera of three Palestinians in 1990. Directors/photography: Nazeh Adel Darwazeh, Abdel Salam Shihada, Suher Ismael; producers, Daoud Kuttab, Ilan Ziv, Jonathan Miller; translations, Palestine Aid Society, Christine Hallak; music, Sabreen Al Rahaleh; narrators, Mazim Chami, Nezar Andary, Fatima Ghazi. Production: Tamouz Media; Al Quds Television Productions, 1991.
