= Fadel Shana'a =

Palestinian journalist (1984 – 2008)

- فضل شناعة
- Born: 27 March 1984; Khan Yunis, Palestine
- Died: 16 April 2008 (aged 24); Bureij, Palestine
- Cause of death: Killed during the Al Bureij killings
- Education: Al-Aqsa University; Al-Azhar University
- Occupation: cameraman for Reuters

Fadel Shana'a (Arabic: فضل شناعة; 27 March 1984 – 16 April 2008) was a Palestinian journalist working as a cameraman for Reuters. He was killed, along with eight bystanders (aged 12 to 20) by a flechette shell fired by an Israeli tank in the Gaza Strip in an attack referred to as the 2008 Bureij killings.

== Life and career ==
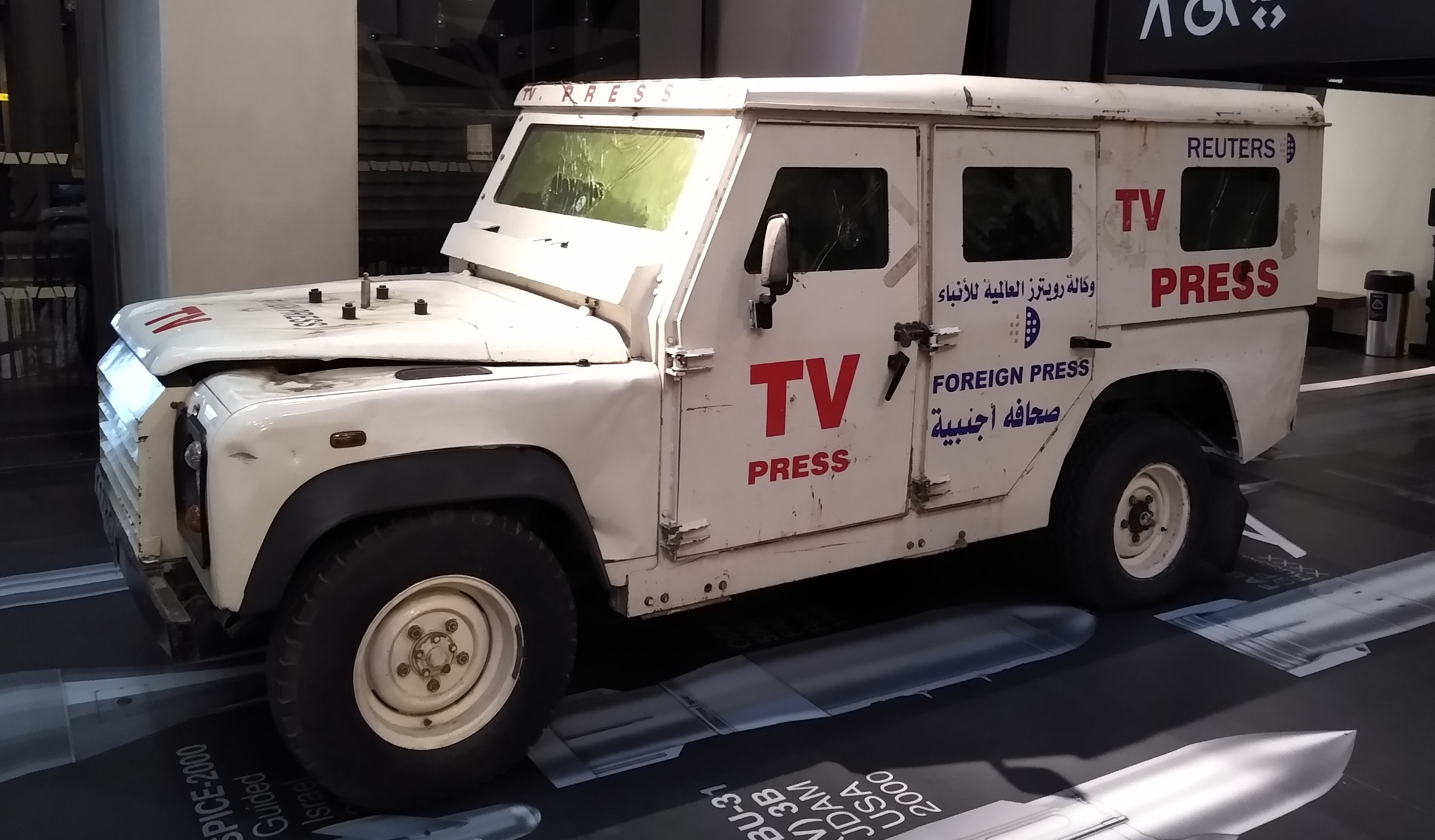
An armored vehicle used by Fadel Shana'a in 2006

Shana'a was born on 27 March 1984 in Khan Yunis, a city in the southern Gaza Strip of Palestine. After graduating from Al-Aqsa University in the field of journalism, he later attended Al-Azhar University in Cairo, Egypt. In August 2006, while working as a cameraman for Reuters, Shana'a received minor injuries when the armored media vehicle he was riding was targeted by an Israeli helicopter's missile. An investigation was called for by David Schlesinger, the then-editor-in-chief for Reuters.

== Killing ==
On 16 April 2008, nearly two years after being injured, Shana'a was killed along with eight bystanders between the ages of 12 and 20 by a flechette shell fired by an Israeli tank as part of the Al Bureij killings. His death was confirmed by medical examiners the following day.

Shana'a's video footage shows the tank firing and a glimpse of the incoming shell before going black at the moment of impact. Schlesinger again called for an investigation, as did Human Rights Watch, whose Middle East director stated that "Israeli soldiers did not make sure they were aiming at a military target before firing, and there is evidence suggesting they actually targeted the journalists." The Al Mezan Center for Human Rights denounced the killing as a deliberate war crime.

The Israel Defense Forces (IDF) released a statement saying: "The IDF wishes to emphasize that unlike terrorist organizations, not only does it not deliberately target uninvolved civilians, it also uses means to avoid such incidents... Reports claiming the opposite are false and misleading." On 13 August 2008, it was reported that the IDF had closed an investigation into the death of Shana'a without taking disciplinary action against the tank crew that killed him. In a letter sent to Reuters, then Chief Military Advocate General, Avichai Mandelblit, said: "In light of the reasonable conclusion reached by the tank crew and its superiors, that the characters were hostile and were carrying an object most likely to be a weapon, the decision to fire at the targets ... was sound." David Schlesinger said: "I'm extremely disappointed that this report condones a disproportionate use of deadly force in a situation the army itself admitted had not been analysed clearly." He added: "They would appear to take the view that any raising of a camera into position could garner a deadly response." In a statement issued at its London headquarters, Reuters said the army probe could effectively give soldiers a "free hand to kill", without being sure of the identity of their targets.

Shana's funeral was held in Gaza and was attended by thousands of people.

== See also ==
- Media coverage of the Arab–Israeli conflict
- List of journalists killed during the Israeli-Palestinian conflict
