= Al Bureij killings =

Killing of civilians by Israeli army at Bureij

- Part of the Israeli–Palestinian conflict
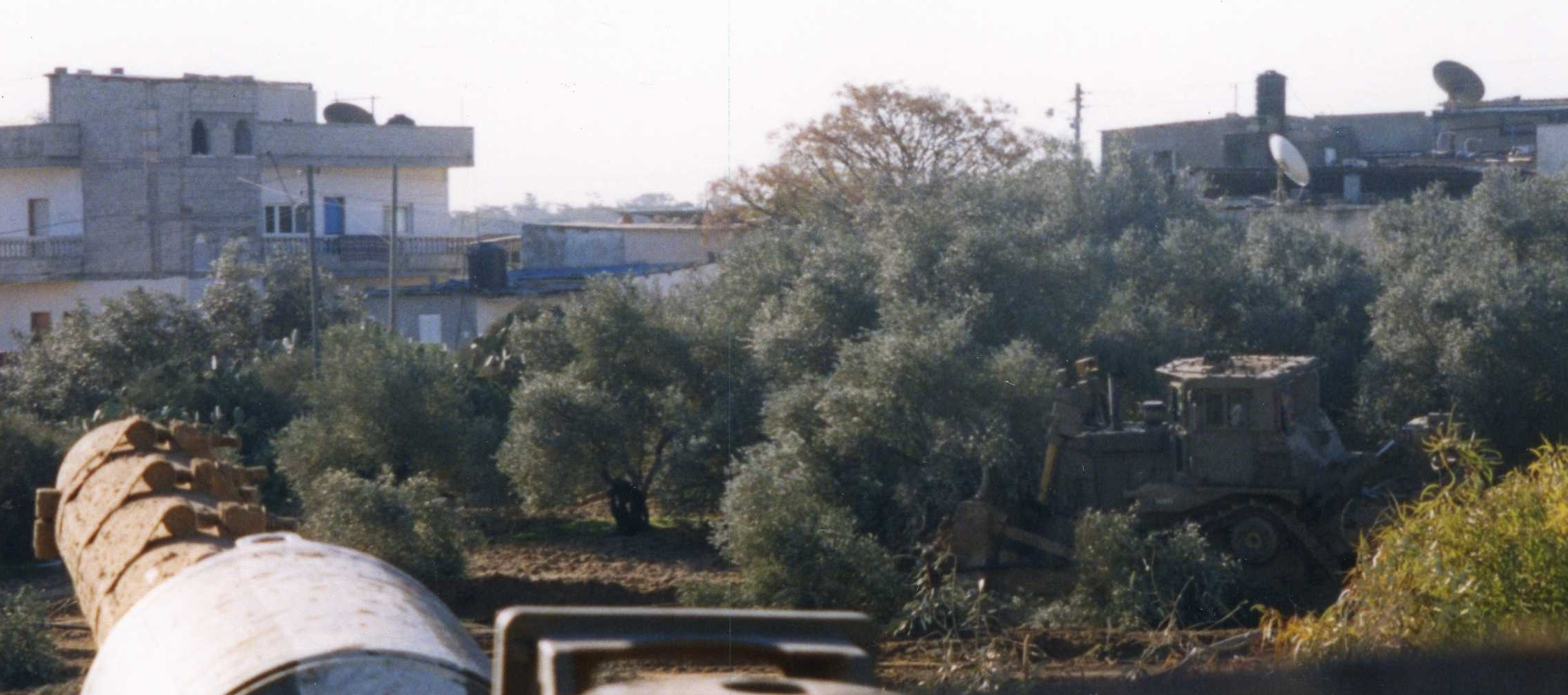
- Al-Bureij refugee camp, 2005

- Bureij (the Gaza Strip) Bureij (State of Palestine)
- Location: 31°32′00″N 35°05′42″E; Bureij, Palestine
- Date: 16 April 2008; 18 years ago
- Attack type: Tank shelling
- Weapon: Flechette shell
- Deaths: 9
- Perpetrator: Israel Defense Forces

On 16 April 2008, Israeli soldiers killed Reuters cameraman Fadel Shana'a along with eight other Palestinians, among them six children, when they fired a tank shell at the group in the Bureij refugee camp in the Gaza Strip. Shana'a's video footage shows the tank firing and a glimpse of the incoming shell before going black at the moment of impact. Shana'a had been covering an earlier missile strike near Juhor al-Dik in which the Israeli air force had killed nine Palestinians. The previous night, a battle between Hamas and the IDF forces resulted in three IDF deaths, four Hamas deaths and 14 Palestinian civilian deaths, including eight children.

Then Reuters Editor-in-chief David Schlesinger called for an investigation, as did Human Rights Watch, whose Middle East director stated, "Israeli soldiers did not make sure they were aiming at a military target before firing, and there is evidence suggesting they actually targeted the journalists." Announcing an investigation in to the strike, the IDF released a statement saying "The IDF wishes to emphasize that unlike terrorist organizations, not only does it not deliberately target uninvolved civilians, it also uses means to avoid such incidents... Reports claiming the opposite are false and misleading."

In August, the Israeli military announced they had cleared the tank crew of wrongdoing. Then Israeli Chief Military Advocate General Avichai Mandelblit said, in a letter sent to Reuters, "In light of the reasonable conclusion reached by the tank crew and its superiors, that the characters were hostile and were carrying an object most likely to be a weapon, the decision to fire at the targets ... was sound", David Schlesinger said that "I'm extremely disappointed that this report condones a disproportionate use of deadly force in a situation the army itself admitted had not been analysed clearly" and "they would appear to take the view that any raising of a camera into position could garner a deadly response".

Reuters said in a statement that the army probe could effectively give soldiers a "free hand to kill," without being sure of the identity of their targets. Amnesty International denounced the investigation as scandalous and said no proper investigation was carried out into the cases of the 13 other unarmed civilians, including eight children, killed that day and that "attacks by armed groups cannot justify the culture of impunity towards the killing of Palestinian civilians in the Israeli army."

Reporters Without Borders, in a press release titled "Israeli enquiry unsurprisingly decides not to punish soldiers who killed Palestinian cameraman", said that they were "outraged" by the report, and that "the findings of the Israeli investigation are confusing and offer no convincing explanation of the circumstances that led to the Reuters cameraman's death. The Israel Defence Forces never want to admit they are wrong in such cases. Israeli soldiers enjoy an impunity that endangers many journalists covering their operations."

== See also ==
- 2008 Israel–Hamas ceasefire
- Israeli war crimes
