= List of journalists killed during the Israeli–Palestinian conflict =

Important cities in the Israeli–Palestinian conflict where journalists have been killed.

During the Israeli–Palestinian conflict, foreign war correspondents, professional journalists, and citizen journalists have been killed since the beginning of the conflict in 1948 or have died as a result of their reporting. Also included in a separate form are those journalists whose whereabouts are unknown or whose disappearance is a result of their reporting and the period of their disappearance, including those cases where it is unknown as to whether or not they are casualties.

UNESCO has documented 21 professional or citizen journalists who have died in Israel and the Occupied Palestinian Territory since 2002. The Committee to Protect Journalists has documented 25 journalists killed in Israel and the Occupied Palestinian Territory since 1992. As of May 2022, the United Nations Office for the Coordination of Humanitarian Affairs estimates 6,036 Palestinian fatalities and 272 Israeli fatalities as a result of the conflict since 2008.

The United Nations Office of the High Commissioner for Human Rights condemned the killing of Palestinian journalists in the Gaza Strip, including two Al Jazeera television reporters, by Israel.

On 30 September 2026, following the killing of journalist Mohammed Abdul Aziz al-Najjar, the Gaza government media office announced that the number of Palestinian journalists who were killed by the Israeli army in the Gaza Strip had reached 263. This figure covers the period since the start of the war.

== Professional or citizen journalists/media activists killed in Israel and the Occupied Palestinian Territory ==
Date	Name	Location	Notes	Refs
7 October 2023 - Present	See List of journalists killed in the Gaza war			
6 October 2023	Mohammad Salhi (Palestine)	al-Bureij refugee camp, Gaza Strip	Freelance journalist shot by IDF during 2023 conflict	
1 June 2022	Ghufran Harun Warasneh (Palestine)	al-Arroub refugee camp, West Bank	Dream Radio journalist shot in the chest by IDF en route to job in Hebron	
11 May 2022	Shireen Abu Akleh (Palestine)	Jenin, West Bank	Al Jazeera journalist shot in the head by Israeli forces	
19 May 2021	Yusef Abu Hussein (Palestine)	Sheikh Radwan, Gaza Strip	Radio broadcaster killed in his house by Israeli missile strikes	
13 April 2018	Ahmad Abu Hussein (Palestine)	Jabalia, Gaza Strip	Photographer shot in the abdomen by IDF	
6 April 2018	Yaser Murtaja (Palestine)	Khan Yunis, Gaza Strip	Video journalist shot in the abdomen by IDF sniper	
13 August 2014	Simone Camilli (Italy)	Beit Lahiya, Gaza Strip	Associated Press journalists killed by live bomb dropped by IDF on soccer field in the Gaza Strip	
13 August 2014	Ali Shehda Abu Afash (Palestine)	Beit Lahiya, Gaza Strip	Associated Press journalists killed by live bomb dropped by IDF on soccer field in the Gaza Strip	
31 July 2014	Mohammed Daher (Palestine)	Shuja'iyya, Gaza City, Gaza Strip	Al-Resalah newspaper editor who was critically injured by an Israeli strike on his house on July 20 (during the Battle of Shuja'iyya) and died 11 days later	
30 July 2014	Mohammed Nour al-Din al-Deiri (Palestine)	Shuja'iyya, Gaza City, Gaza Strip	Palestine Network for Press and Media cameramen killed in Israeli bombing of a market in Gaza	
30 July 2014	Rami Rayan (Palestine)	Shuja'iyya, Gaza City, Gaza Strip	Palestine Network for Press and Media cameramen killed in Israeli bombing of a market in Gaza	
30 July 2014	Sameh al-Aryan (Palestine)	Shuja'iyya, Gaza City, Gaza Strip	Al-Aqsa TV cameraman killed in Israeli bombing of a market in Gaza	
30 July 2014	Ahed Zaqout (Palestine)	Gaza City, Gaza Strip	Former Palestine national football team player and sports television presenter killed in Israeli bombing of his building as he slept	
20 July 2014	Khaled Hamad (Palestine)	Shuja'iyya, Gaza City, Gaza Strip	Continue TV cameraman killed by Israeli shelling	
9 July 2014	Hamid Shibab (Palestine)	Gaza Strip	Driver for Media 24 new killed in his car by Israeli airstrike	
20 November 2012	Mahmoud al-Kumi (Palestine)	Gaza City, Gaza Strip	Al-Aqsa TV cameramen killed in car by Israeli missile strike	
20 November 2012	Hussam Salama (Palestine)	Gaza City, Gaza Strip	Al-Aqsa TV cameramen killed in car by Israeli missile strike	
20 November 2012	Mohammed Abu Eisha (Palestine)	Deir al-Balah, Gaza Strip	Al Quds Educational Radio employee killed in car by Israeli missile strike	
14 April 2011	Vittorio Arrigoni (Italy)	Gaza City, Gaza Strip	Italian activist, newspaper and radio journalist, and International Solidarity Movement member kidnapped and murdered by Gazan extremist group Tawhid al-Jihad	
7 January 2009	Basil Ibrahim Faraj (Palestine)	Gaza Strip	Palestinian Media and Communication Company cameraman killed by Israeli airstrike	
6 April 2008	Fadel Shana'a (Palestine)	Bureij refugee camp, Gaza Strip	Reuters cameraman killed by flechette shell during Al Bureij massacre	
14 May 2007	Suleiman Abdul-Rahim al-Ashi (Palestine)	Gaza City, Gaza Strip	Editor and distributor of daily Palestine newspaper beaten and shot by gunmen in presidential guard uniforms, potentially Fatah	
14 May 2007	Mohammad Matar Abdo (Palestine)	Gaza City, Gaza Strip	Editor and distributor of daily Palestine newspaper beaten and shot by gunmen in presidential guard uniforms, potentially Fatah	
22 March 2004	Mohamed Abu Halima (Palestine)	Balata refugee camp, West Bank	Radio correspondent and freelance photographer shot in the stomach by IDF	
2 March 2004	Khalil al-Zaben (Palestine)	Gaza City, Gaza Strip	Magazine journalist and advisor to President Yasser Arafat shot outside his office by gunmen of unknown, but suspected Palestinian, origin	
2 May 2003	James Miller (Wales)	Rafah, Gaza Strip	Documentary filmmaker shot in the neck by IDF	
18 April 2003	Nazeh Darwazi (Palestine)	Nablus, West Bank	Freelance photographer shot in the head by IDF	
22 September 2002	Issam Hamza Tillawi (Palestine)	Ramallah, West Bank	Voice of Palestine radio host shot in the head by IDF sniper during protest against the siege of the Palestinian National Authority headquarters	
12 July 2002	Imad Abu Zahra (Palestine)	Jenin, West Bank	Freelance photographer shot in the leg by IDF	
12 March 2002	Raffaele Ciriello (Italy)	Ramallah, West Bank	Freelance photographer shot six times in the chest by IDF	
31 July 2001	Muhammad al-Bishawi (Palestine)	Nablus, West Bank	Najah Press Office and IslamOnline reporter killed in Israeli bombing of Palestinian Center for Studies and Media	
31 July 2001	Othman al-Qatanani (Palestine)	Nablus, West Bank	Kuwait News Agency correspondent killed in Israeli bombing of Palestinian Center for Studies and Media	
28 October 2000	Aziz Al-Tineh (Palestine)	Bethlehem, West Bank	Wafa reporter killed in explosion of unknown origin	

== Professional or citizen journalists/media activists killed outside of Israel and the Occupied Palestinian Territory ==
Date	Name	Location	Notes	Refs
31 May 2010	Cevdet Kılıçlar (Turkey)	Aboard the MV Mavi Marmara, International waters of the Mediterranean Sea	Anadolu'da Vakit correspondent and webmaster of the Foundation for Human Rights and Freedoms and Humanitarian Relief (IHH) killed by the IDF while taking photos during the 2010 Gaza flotilla raid	
8 July 1972	Ghassan Kanafani (Palestine)	Beirut, Lebanon	Author, activist, and journalist assassinated by Mossad in response to the Lod airport massacre	

== Professional or citizen journalists/media activists wounded non-fatally ==
Date	Name	Location	Notes	Refs
31 March 2002	Anthony Shadid (Palestine)	Ramallah, West Bank	Shot in the shoulder by an Israel sniper while reporting for the Boston Globe.	

== Professional journalists and citizen journalists/media activists who were missing and then freed ==
Date	Name	Location	Notes	Refs
12 March 2007 – 4 July 2007	Alan Johnston (United Kingdom)	Gaza City, Gaza Strip	BBC. Kidnapped by the Palestinian Army of Islam in Gaza City and held for 114 days. His capture led to protests across the Palestinian territories, United Kingdom, and worldwide. His eventual release was orchestrated by Hamas.	
14 August 2006 – 27 August 2006	Olaf Wiig (New Zealand) and Steve Centanni (United States)	Gaza City, Gaza Strip	Fox News. Kidnapped by the Palestinian Holy Jihad Brigades in Gaza City and held for 13 days. The two were released after filming a video proclaiming their conversion to Islam, which they later claimed was coerced at gunpoint and was not real.	

== See also ==
- List of journalists killed in the Gaza war
- History of Palestinian journalism
- Mass media in Israel
- Newspapers of Palestine
- List of Israeli civilian casualties in the Second Intifada
