= Geha Interchange bus stop bombing =

Suicide bombing by Palestinian bomber

- Part of the Second Intifada militancy campaign
- The attack site
- Location: 32°05′32″N 34°50′46″E; Geha Interchange, Central District, Israel
- Date: December 25, 2003; 22 years ago 18:22 pm (UTC+2)
- Attack type: Suicide bombing
- Deaths: 3 soldiers and 1 civilian (+1 bomber)
- Injuries: 16
- Perpetrator: Popular Front for the Liberation of Palestine claimed responsibility

The Geha Interchange bus stop bombing was a suicide bombing which occurred on December 25, 2003 on a bus stop at the Geha Interchange on the outskirts of Tel Aviv, Israel. Four people died in the attack and sixteen were injured. The Popular Front for the Liberation of Palestine claimed responsibility for the attack.

== The attack ==
On Thursday, around 6:30 pm on December 25, 2003, a Palestinian suicide bomber detonated an explosive device near a bus stop at the Geha Interchange. Three Israeli soldiers and a 19-year-old woman died in the attack and 16 others were wounded. Two died instantly and a third died on the way to the hospital. The fourth victim died in the hospital several hours later.

== The perpetrators ==
The Popular Front for the Liberation of Palestine claimed responsibility for the attack and stated that the suicide bomber was 18-year-old Saed Hanani of Beit Furik, a village in the West Bank. The attack came shortly after Israeli helicopters killed an Islamic Jihad commander and four other Palestinians in Gaza.
