= Deaths of Simone Camilli and Ali Shehda Abu Afash =

Killing of journalists in the Gaza strip

Simone Camilli
- Born: ca. 1979; Rome, Italy
- Died: August 13, 2014; Beit Lahiya, Gaza
- Cause of death: Bomb explosion
- Resting place: Pitigliano, Italy
- Occupation: Journalist
- Organization: Associated Press
- Known for: Detailed video images
- Notable work: First assignment on illness of Pope John Paul II

Ali Shehda Abu Afash
- Born: ca. 1978; Palestine
- Died: August 13, 2014; Beit Lahiya, Gaza
- Cause of death: Bomb explosion
- Citizenship: Palestine
- Occupation: Journalist
- Organization: Gaza Centre for Media Freedom
- Known for: Freelance translator

Simone Camilli and Ali Shehda Abu Afash (1979 - 13 August 2014) were journalists for the Associated Press who were killed by an Israeli bomb while reporting on the 2014 Israel–Gaza conflict. Camilli, an Italian, and Abu Afash, a Palestinian, had been reporting on a Palestinian bomb disposal team in Beit Lahiya, Gaza Strip as they dismantled an unexploded Israeli missile. The explosive was triggered, killing Camilli, Abu Afash, and 4 members of the bomb squad. Camilli became the first foreign journalist to die by an Israeli bomb in the 2014 conflict.

== Personal history ==
Simone Camilli was born in Rome, Italy, on 28 March 1979. He and his partner Ylva van den Berg had a daughter named Nour Camilli. His funeral was held on Friday, 15 August 2014 in the Cathedral of SS Peter and Paul in Pitigliano, where his father had been the mayor since 2011.

Ali Shehda Abu Afash was born around 1978. He was married to Shireen Abu Afash, and had two daughters named Majd (7) and Wajd (2). He had traveled throughout the Middle East, and was known for his love of soccer and for being the person family members called when they needed help fixing a computer.

== Career ==
Simone Camilli began as an intern in Rome for the Associated Press in 2005. One of his first assignments was the death of Pope John Paul. In 2006, he moved to Jerusalem, where he covered the Israeli-Palestinian Conflict, Lebanon, and Iraq. He was interested in reporting on war and its effects on people's lives, and felt that war reporting was often missing a human element. In 2014, he moved to Beirut, Lebanon, and he had been planning to go on an assignment to Erbil, Iraq when the 2014 Israel-Gaza conflict broke out. His colleagues recalled that he had a deep attachment to Gaza and its people that motivated him to change his plans and risk reporting on the Israeli assault instead.

Abu Afash was originally a computer engineer at a health union in the Gaza Strip, but he quit his job to become a journalist. He began as an assistant and translator to various news outlets, particularly Agence France-Presse. From there, he was hired to the Gaza Centre for Media Freedom to work as a full-time Arabic translator and journalist. He reported for three months on the problems Palestinian journalists dealt with, and acted as an advocate for young freelancers. Abu Afash traveled around the Middle East to participate in journalistic workshops and training programs, including those of the Gaza Centre's sister organization, the Doha Centre for Media Freedom.

== Death ==
Camilli and Abu Afash died while reporting on the morning of August 14, 2014 from a Beit Lahiya soccer field used to gather unexploded ordnance. That Wednesday, Camilli and Abu Afash were at the scene filming a Gazan bomb squad while they attempted to defuse a missile dropped by an Israeli F-16. The bomb exploded during the process and killed six people, including the two journalists.

Hatem Moussa, an AP photographer who was working with Camilli and Abu Afash, survived but was badly injured from the explosion.

== Reactions ==
Camilli was the 33rd journalist to die while reporting for the Associated Press. Maria Grazia Murru, a senior producer at the AP who worked with Camilli, said, "Camilli was passionate about wanting to tell people’s stories and wanted to be where the story was all the time. He wanted to learn everything and be the first, he was never happy waiting for images to happen."

Irina Bokova, director-general of UNESCO, said, "I deplore the death of Simone Camilli and Ali Shehda Abu Afash, lifting the death toll of media workers from the current conflict (to eight journalists at the time). The loss of individuals who brave danger to ensure that the world is kept informed of events in conflict zones affects to us all."

Pope Francis conducted a silent prayer with a group of around 70 journalists who were aboard the papal plane and at the time heading to a visit in South Korea.

== See also ==
- List of journalists killed during the Israeli-Palestinian conflict
- James Miller (filmmaker) - Welsh documentary filmmaker killed by the IDF in 2003
