= Geha Interchange =

Location
- Central District, Israel
- Coordinates: 32°5′32″N 34°50′44″E
- Roads at junction: Highway 4 Road 481

Construction
- Opened: March 30, 1981

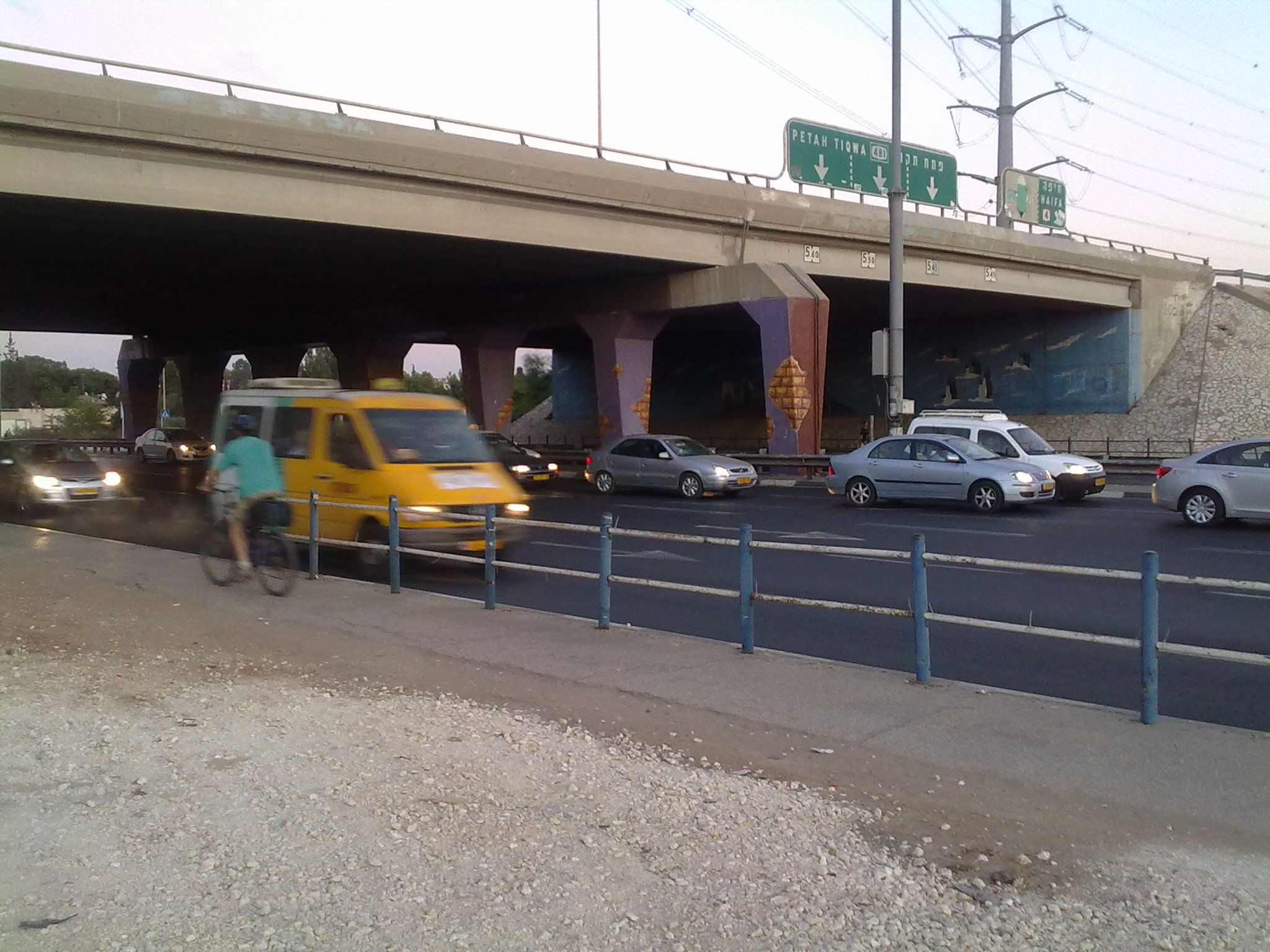
The Geha Interchange

The Geha Interchange is the confluence of Highway 4 and Road 481 in Israel. The interchange is named after the Geha Mental Health Center, which was once located near the Interchange. but was moved when it was decided to construct the Interchange. The interchange opened to traffic on March 30, 1981.

The Interchange allows continuous travel without the need of traffic lights or intersections for the passengers of Highway 4 who pass on a bridge over Road 481.

The Interchange forms the border between Petah Tikva to Bnei Brak and is used as one of the main entrances into those two cities. Prior to the construction of the Geha interchange, a junction existed in the site, due to this, many locals today still refer to the Interchange as the "Geha Junction".

== See also ==
- Geha Interchange bus stop bombing
