= Noor Harazeen =

Palestinian journalist and filmmaker

- Born: 1989 (age 36–37); Cairo, Egypt
- Education: Al-Azhar University
- Occupation: Journalist
- Employer: CGTN
- Known for: Coverage of the Gaza war

Noor Harazeen (born 1989) is a Palestinian journalist and filmmaker who gained attention for her coverage of the Gaza war as CGTN's correspondent in Gaza.

== Career ==
=== Early life and education ===
Harazeen was born in Cairo, Egypt in 1989, and moved to Dubai, UAE with her parents at an early age. The family remained in Dubai until 2006, when they moved to Gaza.

In 2008, Harazeen began studying English education at Al-Azhar University in Gaza and started working as a reporter for Al-Etejah in 2012. She graduated from Al-Azhar University in 2013.

In 2014, Harazeen began working as a reporter for CGTN. She has also worked for TeleSUR, CCTV, and AJ+.

=== Political activism ===
Harazeen has expressed her support for the BDS Movement.

In 2012, she met PFLP member Leila Khaled and wrote on her Facebook page "With the Amazing Laila Khalid, The PLFP Resistance fighter Who hijacked ‘ TWA Flight 840 ‘ on its way from Rome to Athens".

Several of Harazeen's family members were part of the militant organization Palestinian Islamic Jihad (PIJ), including her uncle Majed Al-Harazeen, who was killed in a 2007 air strike.

=== 2023 Israel-Hamas war ===
At 6:30 am on 7 October 2023, Harazeen heard the sound of rockets being fired from Gaza.

When Israel's military urged residents to evacuate northern Gaza, Harazeen decided to relocate to southern Gaza with her husband and two children. She asked her parents to evacuate with her, but they refused to come, as they feared a second Nakba. However, Harazeen was reunited with her parents several weeks later.

During the war, Harazeen mainly reported from a hospital, focusing on the children who were brought into the hospital. She described 15 October as one of her most challenging days, as she witnessed children with missing limbs and heads being brought into the hospital.

By early November, she had 100,000 followers on Instagram, which was attributed to her ability to speak English.
