= Netanya Market bombing =

2002 Hamas suicide bombing in Israel

- Part of the Second Intifada militancy campaign
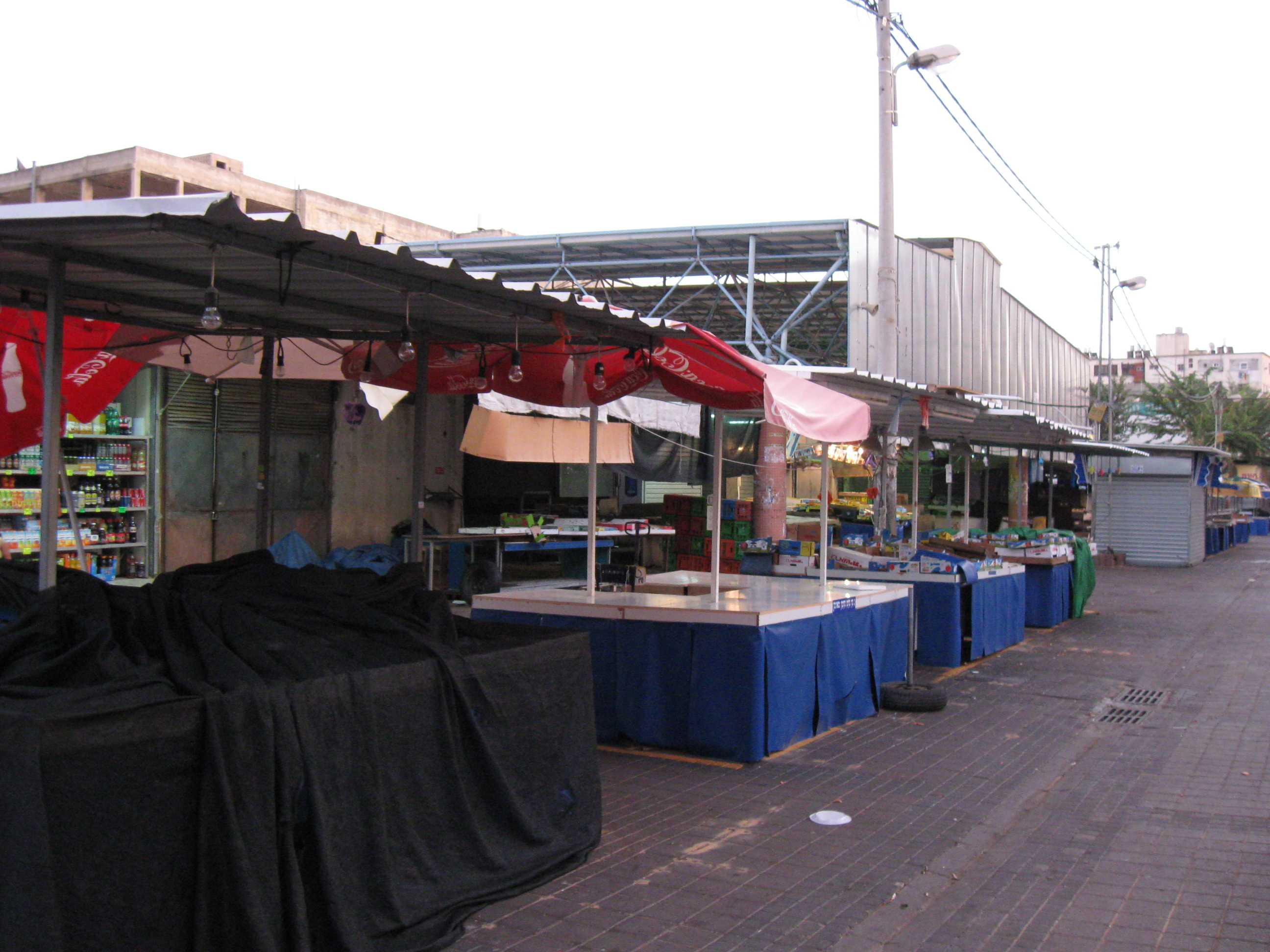
- Netanya's open-air market, 2010

- The attack site
- Location: 32.3295°N 34.8596°E; Netanya, Israel
- Date: 19 May 2002; 24 years ago 16:20 pm
- Attack type: Suicide bombing
- Deaths: 3 civilians (+1 bomber)
- Injuries: 56
- Perpetrators: Hamas and the PFLP claimed responsibility

The Netanya Market bombing was a suicide bombing which occurred on 19 May 2002 at the entrance to the main fruit and vegetable open-air market in Netanya, Israel. The site of the attack was chosen in order to cause maximum number of casualties. Three people were killed in the attack, and 56–59 were injured.

== Background ==
Netanya has been a frequent target of Palestinian suicide bombers. A prior attack on 27 March 2002 at the Park Hotel in Netanya killed 29 people during the Jewish Passover Seder and triggered Operation Defensive Shield, a large Israeli military offensive in the West Bank.

== The attack ==
On Sunday, 19 May 2002, during the afternoon hours, a Palestinian suicide bomber disguised as an IDF soldier managed to slip through several police checkpoints with the assistance of a female collaborator. The suicide bomber who wore an explosive belt hidden underneath his clothes, packed with nails and bolts, and detonated the explosive device at the entrance to the main open market of the Israeli coastal city of Netanya. The blast killed three civilians and injured 56 people, at least 10 of whom were left in severe condition.

Two Palestinian militant groups, Hamas and the PFLP, claimed responsibility for the attack. The attack is thought to have been carried out by the PFLP's Abu Ali Mustapha Brigades.

The PFLP said the attack purpose was to protest the detention of the group's leader, Ahmad Saadat, by the Palestinian Authority in connection with the PFLP assassination of the Israeli tourism minister Rehavam Ze'evi.

== Subsequent related events ==
Lawsuits were filed against Arab Bank, NatWest and Crédit Lyonnais for channeling money to Hamas.

In response to the attack Israeli army forces conducted several operational activities in the towns of Tulkarm and Ramallah in the West Bank for a relatively short period time during the late Sunday, though there was no major Israeli retaliation for the Netanya Market bombing.

After the attack the Israeli defense establishment stated that the attack was ordered by the head of the PFLP Ahmed Saadat from his cell in the PA-run Jericho Prison, under U.S. and British supervision. They also found that the suicide bomber managed to reach the market in Netanya with the assistance of another person who drove him there.

Later on it was revealed that the driver was Adel Adnan Mahmoud Jumaa, a resident of Taybeh, who admitted that he had driven the suicide-bomber and a woman collaborator to Netanya. The woman was Da'a Jiusi, a 21-year-old Palestinian female student from the Palestinian city Tulkarem who later on confessed that she was asked to accompany the suicide bomber provide cover as an innocent-looking couple.

In addition, after the attack Israeli officials revealed that the Israeli security forces received an actual warning about the attack 20 minutes before the suicide bomber detonated his explosive device but added that at that point they were powerless from stopping him.

On 30 June 2003 an Israeli Military Court sentenced Da'a Jiusi to three life sentences plus 30 years in prison. Jiusi was convicted of leading a suicide bomber to explode in a civilian market.

Another man, Alam Kabi from Nablus, was sentenced in 2004 to nine life sentences, for dispatching the suicide bomber who perpetrated the Netanya Market bombing, along with several other attacks.

=== Jiwasi's Release ===
On 18 October 2011, Jiwasi Ziyad Dawa'a, who was originally sentenced to 3 life sentences, was released to the West Bank as part of the Gilad Shalit prisoner exchange between Israel and Hamas.

== Official reactions ==
Involved parties

Israel: Immediately after the attack in Netanya, Israeli officials stated that Israeli government was unlikely to launch a broad military operation in retaliation to the terror attack. Instead, they stated that Israeli military forces would continue to carry out targeted raids against armed Palestinian militants.

Palestinian National Authority: PNA officials issued a statement declaring "full condemnation for the terror attack that targeted Israeli civilians."

International

United States:

- U.S. Vice President Dick Cheney called on Yasser Arafat to crack down on Palestinian militant armed groups but added that "there clearly is a class of bombings that he can't rein in". Cheney also stated that the United States plans to send CIA Director George Tenet to the region to assist the security forces of Arafat in targeting the militant organizations.
- National Security Adviser Condoleezza Rice stated that the attack underlined the need of the Palestinians leadership in creating "a unified security apparatus that can be accountable and can deal with issues of terrorism."

United Kingdom: British Foreign Office spokesman has stated that the UK has asked Israel to provide evidence that Ahmed Saadat, the head of the Popular Front for the Liberation of Palestine (PFLP), gave a green light for the attack in the Netanya Market bombing while held by British and American warders in the West Bank city of Jericho.
