= Muna Hawwa =

Palestinian journalist

- مُنى حَوّا

Muna Hawwa (Arabic: مُنى حَوّا) is a Palestinian blogger and journalist from Safed. She has worked as a presenter on AJ+ Arabic and has blogged on Mudawwanat Al Jazeera.

== Biography ==
Muna Hawwa is a Palestinian journalist from Safed. She grew up and studied in Sudan, from elementary school through her masters. She completed her MA in history from the Doha Institute for Studies in Qatar. And a master's degree in political science in African studies from the International University of Africa in Khartoum. She moved to live and work as a journalist in many Arab capitals such as Amman, Riyadh, Khartoum and Doha. She blogs about history— especially the history of al-Andalus—as well as architecture and travel.

Around 2012, she was the media coordinator of al-Multaqa al-Ma'rafi ash-Shababi (الملتقى المعرفي الشبابي), a student-founded organization for intellectually curious students at Jordanian universities.

== Career ==
On Al Jazeera's online news service AJ+ in Arabic, she was a producer and presenter.

In February 2019, she got into a dispute with Dhahi Khalfan Tamim on Twitter over his characterization of the Muslim conquest of Hispania as an "occupation."

=== Suspension from AJ+ ===
On May 17, 2019, the day the German parliament designated the Boycott, Divestment and Sanctions (BDS) campaign as antisemitic, AJ+ Arabic, a youth-oriented online news service from Al Jazeera Media Network, published a 7-minute video presented by Hawwa entitled al-Holokost (الهولوكوست lit. 'The Holocaust') about the Holocaust and the establishment of the State of Israel. The video was condemned as antisemitic by the Israeli Ministry of Foreign Affairs and World Jewish Congress. In a tweet, Emmanuel Nahshon, spokesperson of the Israeli Ministry of Foreign Affairs, condemned the video as "the worst kind of pernicious evil," accusing Al Jazeera of brainwashing Arab youth and describing the network as "ideological descendants of 'Der Stürmer.'" About an hour later, the official Arabic Twitter account of Israeli Foreign Affairs shared the video, with the text "Lies of Al Jazeera Network (Al Jazeera Plus) about the Holocaust..." (كاذيب شبكة الجزيرة (الجزيرة بلس) حول الهولوكوست...), followed by a series of tweets.

Al Jazeera pulled the video within 24 hours, after it had reportedly reached over 1.1 million views, and stated on Twitter: "Al Jazeera Media Network deleted a video produced by AJ+ Arabic because it violated the editorial standards of the Network." The video was preserved in two parts by the Middle East Media Research Institute (MEMRI), an organization founded by Yigal Carmon and described by critics as a pro-Israel advocacy group.

Hawwa and her colleague Amer al-Sayed Omar were subject to disciplinary administrative measures from the Al Jazeera Media Network. Additionally, Al Jazeera announced an internal sensitivity training and awareness program, and AJ+ managing director Dima Khatib admitted that the video was produced without the appropriate editorial oversight.

On May 22, 2019, Hawwa responded publicly in Arabic and English to the disciplinary measures Al Jazeera Media Network took against her, with a tweet and a Facebook post:

Clarification: Regarding the debate about my Holocaust story, I find myself compelled to clarify the following points, I won't comment on any further discussions after this clarification. Of course, there are equally important details that may be revealed in due time: My story didn't deny The Holocaust, neither did it justify it, nor argue whether it is a crime against humanity that deserves all condemnation. It is undoubtedly one of the most horrible crimes in history. However, what was said in the video about the Zionist abuse of the pain and suffering of the Holocaust victims is a claim that has already been posed by many scholars, historians, and journalists against this racist colonial movement...
