= Shaden Abu-Hijleh =

Palestinian peace activist (1941–2002)

- Born: February 15, 1941; Nablus, Mandatory Palestine
- Died: October 11, 2002 (aged 61)
- Occupations: Peace activist, philanthropist

Shaden Abu-Hijleh (February 15, 1941 – October 11, 2002) was a peace activist and philanthropist.

== Family background ==
Shaden Abu-Hijleh was born as Shaden Abdel Qader Al Saleh, the daughter of Abdel Qader Al Saleh who belonged to the Al Haj Mohammed family. He was from the village Talfeet in southeast Nablus. He worked as a teacher between 1930 and 1950 and was a member of the Jordanian parliament for 30 years, holding positions like minister of defense, agriculture, and public works. Her mother, Fatimah, belonged to the Abu-Ghazaleh family.

== Personal life ==
Shaden Abu-Hijleh studied at the public schools in Nablus and graduated from high school in 1958. She continued her studies at Women Teachers’ College in Ramallah and graduated in 1961. In 1959, she was engaged with Dr. Jamal Abu-Hijleh and they married in 1962. The couple lived in Cairo while Jamal Abu-Hijleh finished his education as an ear, nose, throat surgeon. In 1963 they got their first child, a daughter named Lana (as of writing she is working as a senior officer in the United Nations Development Program in Jerusalem). In 1965 they returned to Nablus. Jamal started working as head of the ENT Surgery Departments at the hospitals in Nablus, Jenin and Tulkarem. In 1966 they had a son named Saed, currently working as a lecturer at the An-Najah National University in Nablus. In 1969 they got another boy, named Raed who is an engineer in Dubai and in 1972 another son named Rami who works as an engineer in Chicago.

== Activism ==
Shaden became an activist within the progressive student movement while in high school and continued to be active in college. After the 1967 war she quit her teaching job as a protest to the attempts of the Israel to change the Palestinian educational curriculum. Shaden was very publicly active. She was an active member in The Charitable Cultural and Social Society (Administrative Committee Member), Society for the Safeguarding of Motherhood and Childhood (Administrative Committee Member), Ebal Cultural Center for Palestinian Arts and Folklore (Founding Member), Association for Combating of Smoking and Dangerous Drugs (Founding Member), Palestinian Women for Democratic Change (Founding Member) and as a member of the National Popular Committees that facilitated distribution of food to the needy.

== Death ==
On October 11, 2002, an IDF army jeep stopped outside her house and opened fire at a distance of about 30 yards. Bullets came in through the window. Two hit her in the heart and neck. Her husband Jamal and son Sa’ed received minor injuries. At least 14 bullet casings were found on the scene. The casings were identified as M16 or Galil rifle ammunition. She was buried on October 14. Speakers at her funeral included the All Party Coordination Committee, the governor of Nablus, humanitarian associates and Mustafa Barghouti, head of the Palestine Medical Relief Association.

The Israeli army reported that the soldiers had thought they were under attack and returned fire. A 56-year-old American woman, Gale Courey Toensing, was touched by the reports and paid US$300 for a death notice in The Hartford Courant. According to Cathrine Fischer Schwartz, director of the Jewish Community Relations Council of the Jewish Federation of Greater Hartford, several people called her, expressing concern about the death notice. Others expressed their support.

Ariel Sharon promised both the United States and the European Union that the case would be investigated. At first the IDF said they were responding to disturbances. The initial IDF report said she was hit by a stray bullet. The result was not accepted and a second investigation conducted, but the results were not made public. Due to the pressure from Shaden's family, the IDF investigation was more rigorous than usual. The Military Police probe said that the soldiers fired at the house as a deterrent because a man tried to leave a house during the curfew. One result of the investigation was that the IDF is no longer allowed to fire to enforce the curfew.) nor consider the walls of houses a "natural boundary". Two and a half years after the shooting, Colonel Harel Knafo, who at the time was in command of the Samaria Brigade, and the commander of the company operating in the area was brought before a disciplinary tribunal charged with overstepping their authority to the point of endangerment of life and welfare. The ten soldiers denied firing at the house and had no memory of who fired. None of them said they were in danger nor that they were firing at a "wanted man" escaping. The platoon commander stated "there were no violent disturbances or shooting from the direction of the home of the woman who was killed".

== See also ==
- Rula Hassanein
