= 2001 Immanuel bus attack =

Ambush attack by Palestinian militants

Coordinates: 32.1610°N 35.1480°E

- Part of the Al-Aqsa Intifada militancy campaign
- The attack site
- Location: Immanuel, West Bank
- Date: 12 December 2001; 24 years ago
- Attack type: Ambush, mass murder, spree killing, bombing, shooting attack
- Weapons: AK-47 rifles, hand grenades, a roadside bomb
- Deaths: 11 Israeli civilians (+1 attacker)
- Injuries: 30 Israeli civilians
- Perpetrators: Al-Qassam Brigades (claimed); Al-Aqsa Martyrs' Brigades (claimed)

The 2001 Immanuel bus attack was an ambush attack by Palestinian militants targeting Israeli civilians in the West Bank on 12 December 2001; eleven passengers were killed in the attack and thirty were injured.

Both the al-Qassam Brigades (the military wing of Hamas) and the Fatah-aligned al-Aqsa Martyrs' Brigades claimed responsibility for the attack.

== The attack ==
On 12 December 2001, three armed Palestinians militants planted a roadside bomb beside the road leading to the Israeli settlement of Immanuel south of Nablus. After placing two roadside bombs, the assailants ambushed a bus on its way from Bnei Brak.

Soon after, a non-armoured Dan bus line 189, en route to Immanuel from Bnei Brak, approached the site as two roadside bombs exploded. The bus, which was greatly damaged in the explosions, continued to drive several hundred meters until it was immobilized. Immediately after the bus was immobilized, one of the militants approached the bus, threw hand grenades into the bus, and fired small arms on the passengers of the bus and at the vehicles arriving at the site, while the passengers attempted to flee the bus. The passengers of three other vehicles traveling on this road at that time were also affected.

Shortly after, the three attackers fired on cars near the settlement and rescue workers trying to help the victims. One gunman was run over by an army jeep and then shot dead, but the others escaped. Palestinian officials identified the dead man as 21-year-old Asem Rihan, a Hamas member and student at Al Najah University in Nablus.

== Victims ==
11 people were killed in the attack and about 30 were injured.

They were:

- Yair Amar, 13, of Emmanuel
- Esther Avraham, 42, of Emmanuel
- Border Police Chief Warrant Officer Yoel Bienenfeld, 35, of Moshav Tel Shahar
- Moshe Gutman, 40, of Emmanuel
- Avraham Nahman Nitzani, 17, of Betar Illit
- Yirmiyahu Salem, 48, of Emmanuel
- Israel Sternberg, 46, of Emmanuel
- David Tzarfati, 38, of Ginot Shomron
- Hananya Tzarfati, 32, of Kfar Saba
- Ya'akov Tzarfati, 64, of Kfar Saba
- Haim Chiprot, 52, of Emmanuel, injured in the attack, who died of his wounds on March 25, 2002

David Tzarfati, Hananya Tzarfati and Ya'akov Tzarfati were in a car behind the bus. The sons David and Hananya had taken their father to a doctor's appointment. After the first explosions the sons covered the mother, whose life was saved when the terrorists started shooting into the car, killing the three.

== Official reactions ==
Involved parties

Israel:

- Israeli government spokesman Avi Pazner said, "We hold the Palestinian authorities responsible for the activities of these terrorist group who operate in full daylight and in the full knowledge of the Palestinian Authority and continue their deadly attacks against civilian men, women and children".

Palestinian territories:

- The Palestinian Authority condemned the attack.

== See also ==
- Israeli casualties of war
