= David Schlesinger =

Reuters editor

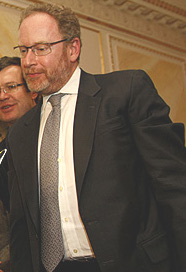
David Schlesinger in 2008

David Schlesinger (April 15, 1960 - ) is the founder and managing director of the media and China independent consultants Tripod Advisors, a D.A. Schlesinger Limited company, based in Hong Kong. www.tripodadvisors.com/about

He is the former chairman of Thomson Reuters China, and represented the company at a senior level and spotted opportunities for businesses across the group throughout Greater China until the end of August 2012.

He was named to that position on February 7, 2011, after completing more than four years as editor-in-chief of Reuters, leading the 3,000 editorial staff in text, television and pictures strategically and operationally. He was named to that post in December 2006 when Reuters was independent. From the creation of Thomson Reuters in April 2008, he became the editor-in-chief of Reuters News at Thomson Reuters. He was global managing editor from October 2003 until becoming editor-in-chief. Schlesinger was executive vice president and Editor, Americas, running operations in North, Central and South America between 2000 and October 2003. He transferred to New York in 1995 as financial editor for the Americas and also served as managing editor for the Americas. He joined Reuters in 1987 in Hong Kong as a correspondent. He then ran Reuters editorial operations in Taiwan, China and the Greater China region in a series of posts between 1989 and 1995. Prior to joining Reuters he wrote for a variety of publications from Hong Kong and had an early career as a teacher. David graduated from Oberlin College and has a master's degree from Harvard University, where he concentrated on Chinese politics.

In 2008, the National Academy of Television Arts & Sciences awarded Schlesinger its Lifetime Achievement Emmy Award for Business and Financial Reporting.

“More than any other news organization, Reuters understands that there is no sharp dividing line between business reporting, political reporting, and other kinds of news,” said Peter Price, President/CEO of NATAS. “As Editor-in-Chief, David Schlesinger has preserved this venerable organization’s core journalistic values while enthusiastically embracing the possibilities and challenges of the digital age, and we are proud to honor him for this achievement.”

Schlesinger is the Honorary President of the International Network of Street Papers (INSP), a board member of the Committee to Protect Journalists, a board member of the Thomson Reuters Foundation, and chairman of the board of the Danenberg Oberlin-in-London Program. He is on the Steering Committee for Oxford University's Reuters Institute for the Study of Journalism and for Tsinghua University's School of Journalism and Communications.
