= Imad Abu Zahra =

Palestinian photojournalist (c. 1968 – 2002)

- Born: c. 1968
- Died: 12 July 2002 (aged 33-34); Jenin, Palestine
- Cause of death: Killed in action
- Education: Graduated from the University of Leicester
- Occupation: Photo journalist
- Employer: Freelance
- Notable work: Starting Jenin's first newspaper Jenin

Imad Abu Zahra (c. 1968 – July 12, 2002) was a freelance photo journalist who worked in Jenin, Palestine. He founded his own local paper for Jenin, which was controversial and ceased publication after five issues. While working in the field, Abu Zahra was fatally shot by Israel forces. He was the third journalist killed during the Second Intifada.

== Personal ==
Abu Zahra was born around 1968 and lived in Jenin, Palestine, throughout his adulthood. He spoke four different languages, including Arabic, Hebrew and English. He received a degree from University of Leicester and would later receive admittance to study mass communications in England for a second degree but was killed. He had no family other than his father Subhi and his mother.

== Career ==
Long before his death in 2002, Imad Abu Zahra started an independent newspaper in 1996. He started a local paper for Palestinians living in Jenin. This paper focused on issues that affected Jenin, which would prove to be controversial only five issues after its debut. In the fifth issue, he published an article that the Federation of Labor in Jenin and the mayor did not like. The article in the newspaper explained how money was being dispersed for a rental of a new headquarters for the General Federation of Labor in Jenin. Although this article explained the need for the new renovations, it did speak poorly of its current conditions. In response to this article, the Federation sought out charges of libel. Abu Zahra was never convicted and he never spent time in jail. Although he could have continued the newspaper after this episode, he could not financially support a rebirth of his newspaper. Abu Zahra would continue his career as a freelance photographer and an interpreter for foreign journalists, until his death in 2002.

== Death ==
Imad Abu Zahra was killed in Jenin, West Bank, in the occupied Palestinian territory. It is shown here relative to Jerusalem and Tel Aviv.

On 12 July 2002, Imad Abu Zahra was shot in the leg by members of the Israel Defense Forces, which created a gaping 5 centimeter wound in his femoral artery of the right thigh. The other journalists who were with him say he was clearly marked as a journalist by the bright jacket labelled in large English letters "Journalist" and he was unarmed. Abu Zahra laid in the street for approximately 30 minutes because the gunfire continued. After the intense, long-lasting shooting, Abu Zahra was finally shoved into an ambulance by his fellow journalist, Said Dahla. Soon after that, Abu Zahra, 35 years old, died from loss of blood. The killing of Zahra was coincidentally on the same week the murderer of Wall Street Journal reporter Daniel Pearl was sentenced to death. An investigation was never conducted for Abu Zahra's death but there is still concern. The concern lies in the blatant and unwarranted nature of the shooting.

== Context ==
Abu Zahra and a colleague of his were in Jenin taking photos of a tank that had hit an electrical pole and became stuck. He would die that day alongside his fellow journalist. The tank was being hit by rocks and fruit thrown by civilians in Jenin. The Israeli Defense Forces claims they retaliated with gun fire in order to stop this. However, some onlookers speak of a completely different scenario playing out. The true reason for the IDF soldiers shooting may never be known. Regardless, Abu Zahra was hit by some of the IDF soldiers and would later bleed to death. He would die that same day. The uncertainties surrounding Abu Zahra's death would lead to much controversy.

== Reactions ==
The Israeli army claims citizens were attacking the tank where Abu Zahra and a colleague were taking pictures. Eyewitnesses say the tank was not being struck by projectiles until after the journalists had been shot. The only reports of people being injured that day were the two journalists Abu Zahra and his colleague. Reporters Without Borders directly recommended the Israeli authorities conduct a thorough investigation concerning Abu Zahra's death. Responsibility for his death has still not been accepted by any one group or person.

== See also ==
- List of journalists killed during the Israeli-Palestinian conflict
