= Yaser Murtaja =

Palestinian photojournalist (1987/1988 – 2018)

Yaser (or Yasser) Murtaja (Arabic: ياسر مرتجى, 1987/1988 – 6 April 2018) was a Palestinian video journalist and photographer from the Gaza Strip.

According to the Palestinian health ministry, he was killed by Israeli security forces during the 2018 Gaza border protests. Murtaja was the co-founder of Ain Media Production Company, which produced video for several international media outlets. He was one of the first individuals to bring a drone camera into Gaza, a territory with no airport.

== Career ==
Murtaja's journalism focused on covering life in Gaza, covering the Blockade of the Gaza Strip and the Gaza–Israel conflict. He was known for his work on Al Jazeera's Gaza: Surviving Shujayea. The documentary covers Bisan Daher after she survived an Israeli attack on Gaza's Shujayea neighborhood that killed six members of her family. Murtaja struck up a close friendship with Bisan to help her cope with the trauma.

In 2015, Murtaja documented a house demolition near the border of Gaza. After filming, he was detained by Hamas and, according to the International Federation of Journailsts, was beaten after he refused to release his footage to those holding him.

Ain Media, the company Murtaja co-founded has produced work for Al Jazeera, BBC, and Vice, among several other media companies. The company received a grant from USAID that the U.S. State Department said had been strictly vetted.

Murtaja worked as an assistant cameraman on the documentary film "Human Flow". He was also a videographer for Ai Weiwei's Journey of Laziz, a video installation shown in a temporary exhibit at The Israel Museum. He worked with filmmaker Alsharif on "Ouroboros", a film about life in Gaza, which premiered at the Locarno Festival in 2017. Murtaja worked in the world of film with minimal institutional support and without a formal cinematic education.

In March 2018, under a photo of Gaza's port, Murtaja wrote: "I hope the day that I can take this image when I am in the sky instead of on the ground will come! My name is Yaser, I am 30 years old, live in Gaza City and I have never travelled before in my life!" He once briefly crossed into Egypt, but was turned around hours later because of security reasons in the Sinai.

His colleague and friend Hana Awad said that Murtaja had been granted an Al Jazeera scholarship for training in Doha.

Murtaja was married and had one child.

== Death ==
Murtaja was covering the "Great March of Return" that resulted in the 2018 Gaza border protests. During the protests on 6 April, he was taking pictures of the demonstrators near the border at Khan Younis. Journalists with him describe him as operating a Steadicam. Some protestors were lighting tires on fire, engulfing the area in thick black smoke. While he was more than 100 metres (330 ft) away from the border, wearing a flak jacket marked "press", he was shot in an exposed area just below the armpit.

Murtaja was with Rushdi Serraj, a photographer and colleague of Murtaja's, when he was shot. Serraj recounted: "Suddenly, he shouts, 'I'm injured, I'm injured, my stomach.'" According to Serraj and the Palestinian health ministry, Murtaja was shot in the stomach by an Israeli sniper. On that day, 9 other Palestinians were killed, 1350 were injured, and 25 were in critical condition; and that approximately 400 of those injured were hit by live ammunition. The Palestinian Red Crescent Society reported that it had treated 700 injuries on 6 April, including 320 from live fire.

According to the Palestinian journalist syndicate, seven other Palestinian journalists were injured by the Israelis during that day's protest.

=== Funeral ===
Hundred of colleagues and friends attended his funeral in Gaza City. His body was covered with a Palestinian flag, and his press jacket laid on the stretcher as it was carried through the streets of Gaza City. The drone he had used for shooting footage of Gaza filmed his funeral.

=== Investigation ===
The Israeli Army announced in a statement on the Israeli Ynetnews website that the "circumstances in which journalists were hit, allegedly by IDF fire, are unknown to us and are being examined". The Foreign Press Association in Israel and the Palestinian territories called on the Israeli army to conduct a fast and open investigation and to show restraint in areas where journalists work.

=== Reactions ===
Reporters Without Borders (RSF) Secretary-General Christophe Deloire condemned Israel's disproportionate response to the protests and called for an independent investigation into the incident.

The European Union responded that Friday's violence "raises serious questions about the proportionate use of force which must be addressed".

Hamas chief Ismail Haniyeh said: “The Return March is a battle of truth and awareness. Yasser held his camera to direct the arrows of truth to convey the image of the besieged people.”

The Palestinian Journalists' Syndicate said in a statement that it held Israel "fully accountable for this crime". It added that seven other reporters were injured in the 6 April protest, in what they described as "deliberate crimes committed by the Israeli army".

Israeli-Arab Zionist Union member of Knesset Zouheir Bahloul asked that the person who shot Murtaja be put on trial.

==== Israeli government ====
The Israeli Defence Force issued the following statement: "The IDF uses means such as warnings, riot dispersal means, and as a last resort firing live rounds in a precise, measured way. The IDF does not intentionally fire on journalists. The circumstances in which journalists were hit, allegedly by IDF fire, are unknown to us and are being examined."

Israel's Defense Minister Avigdor Lieberman suggested that Murtaja had flown a drone above soldiers when he was shot. He also suggested that Hamas men had dressed up as journalists. He said: "You don't know who is a photographer and who is not. Whoever employs drones above Israeli soldiers needs to understand he is endangering himself." The IDF stated that they are unaware of Palestinian use of drones on 6 April, when Murtaja was killed.

A spokesman for the Israeli Prime Minister's office has said that Murtaja was on the Hamas payroll and active in the Hamas "security apparatus’s work on a daily basis", holding a rank equivalent to captain. The International Federation of Journalists disputed this statement, and according to US State Department spokeswoman Heather Nauer, Murtaja had been vetted by United States Agency for International Development prior to receiving a grant.

According to Robert Fisk, "there was no evidence he [Murtaja] ever worked for or with Hamas".

== See also ==
- List of journalists killed during the Israeli-Palestinian conflict
- Shireen Abu Akleh - Palestinian journalist killed by the IDF in 2022
