= French Hill attacks =

Attacks on French Hill

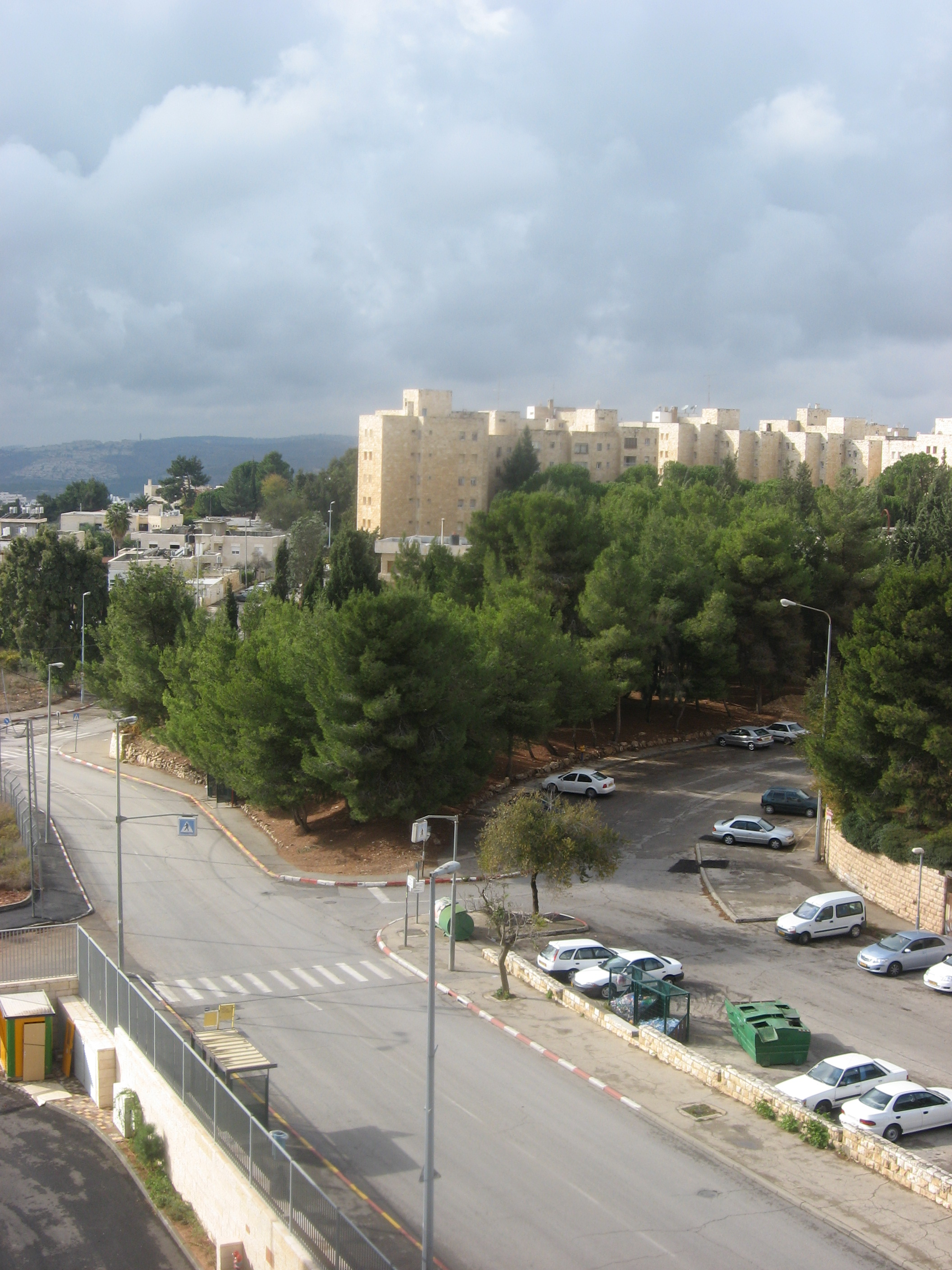
French Hill in 2007

Numerous attacks were carried out by Palestinians near the French Hill neighbourhood in northern East Jerusalem. The neighbourhood is considered an illegal Israeli settlement by numerous sources but this is disputed by Israel than annexed the area as part of the Jerusalem Law and by others.

== List of attacks ==
- On 22 September 1992, a border policeman, Avinoam Peretz, was killed at the junction. The gunman claimed he had been recruited by the Izz ad-Din al-Qassam Brigades.
- In July 1993, a car was hijacked in the junction by a Hamas militant, and the woman driving the car was killed.
- On 26 February 1996, a car was deliberately driven over a group of civilian pedestrians in the junction, killing civilian Flora Yehiel, 28, of Kiryat Ata.
- On 27 March 2001, 27 people were injured and one killed in a suicide bombing on a bus. Hamas claimed responsibility.
- On 15 September 2001, Meir Weisshaus, 23, of Jerusalem, was shot and killed in a drive-by shooting.
- On 7 October 2001, a civilian, Salomon Haim, was murdered.
- On 4 November 2001, two teenage residents were killed and 45 others were injured in a sub-machine gun attack by a Palestinian militant.
- On 17 March 2002, a suicide bombing of an Israeli bus in French Hill injured 25.
- On 19 June 2002, 2002 French Hill suicide bombing: a suicide bomber affiliated with the Al-Aqsa Martyrs' Brigades blew himself up at a crowded bus stop. Seven people were killed, most of them teenagers and children.
- On 18 May 2003, 2003 French Hill suicide bombings: a suicide bomber wearing an explosive belt detonated himself on a bus at the French Hill Junction. Seven Israelis, including one from the Arab village of Shuafat, were killed, and 20 were wounded.Steve Averbach, who had been wounded in the bombing, died of his wounds, bringing the total to eight people.
- On 19 March 2004, George Khoury, son of Elias Khoury of Beit Hanina, was shot in a drive-by shooting while. The Fatah Al-Aqsa Martyrs Brigades claimed responsibility.
- On 22 September 2004, an 18-year-old female suicide bomber belonging to the Al-Aqsa Martyrs' Brigades killed 2 people and wounded 33 in the crowded bus station at the junction.
- On 15 April 2015, A car driven by a Palestinian, Khaled Kutina (Koutineh, 37) of the West Bank village of Anata hit two Israelis at the French Hill junction. Shalom Yohai Sharki (25), son of a prominent religious-Zionist rabbi, was killed. his girlfriend and Shira Klein (23) was seriously injured. The incident was initially treated as a traffic accident, but on investigation was redefined as a possible terror attack. Kutinba's wife said the incident was an accident in bad weather as he was driving to his parents' home in Jerusalem's Old Quarter. On April, 21 the media was permitted to report that Koutineh told police that he was intent on "seeking out Jews to murder."
- On 8 October 2015, A Palestinian youth Subhi Ibrahim Abu Khalifeh (19) stabbed a Haredi (25) in the neck at the French Hill neighbourhood. The assailant was arrested.
