= Ein Farah =

Spring in Wadi Qelt, West Bank

Coordinates: 31°49′57″N 35°18′25″E

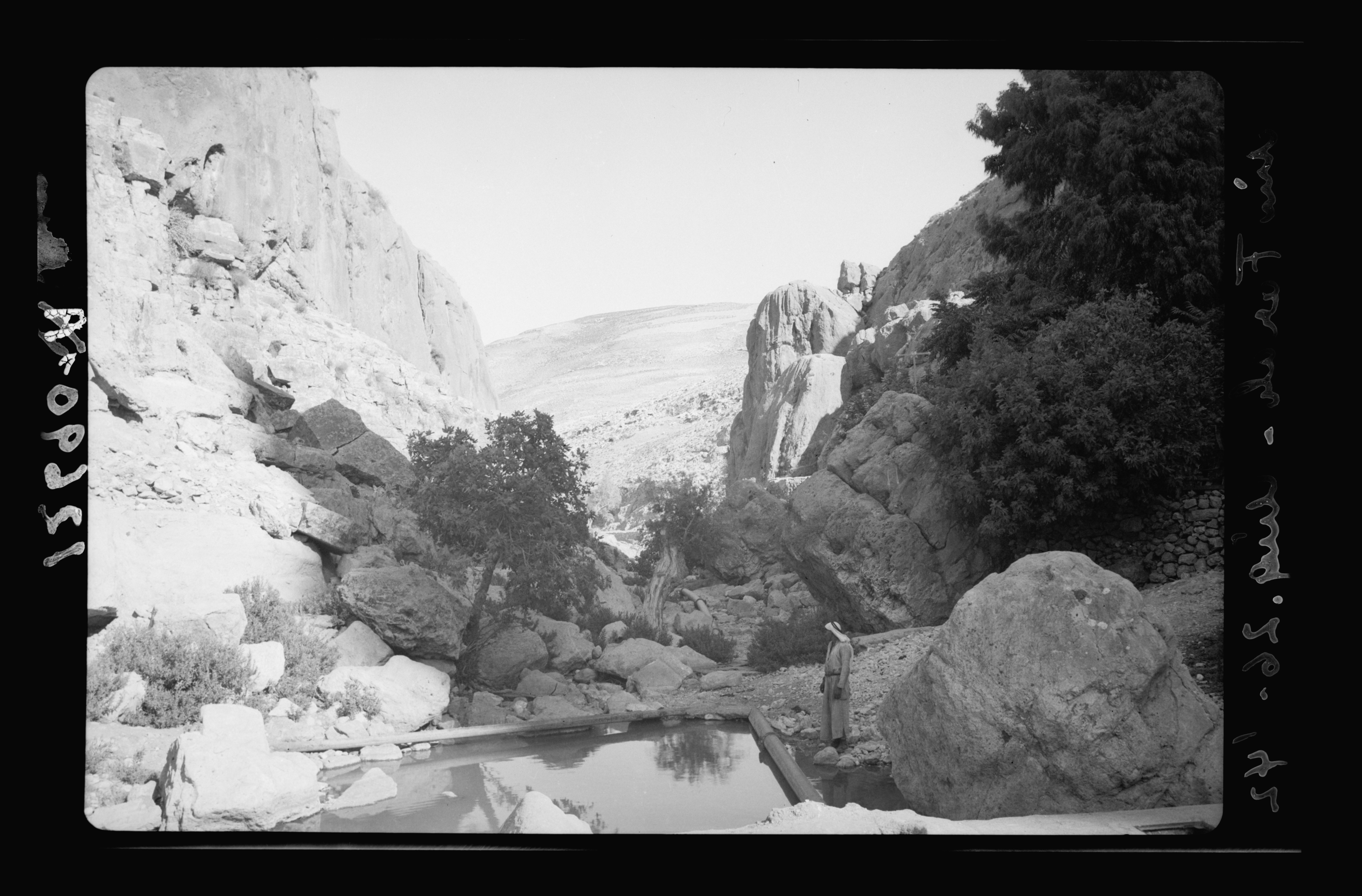
Ein Farah Gorge in 1920s

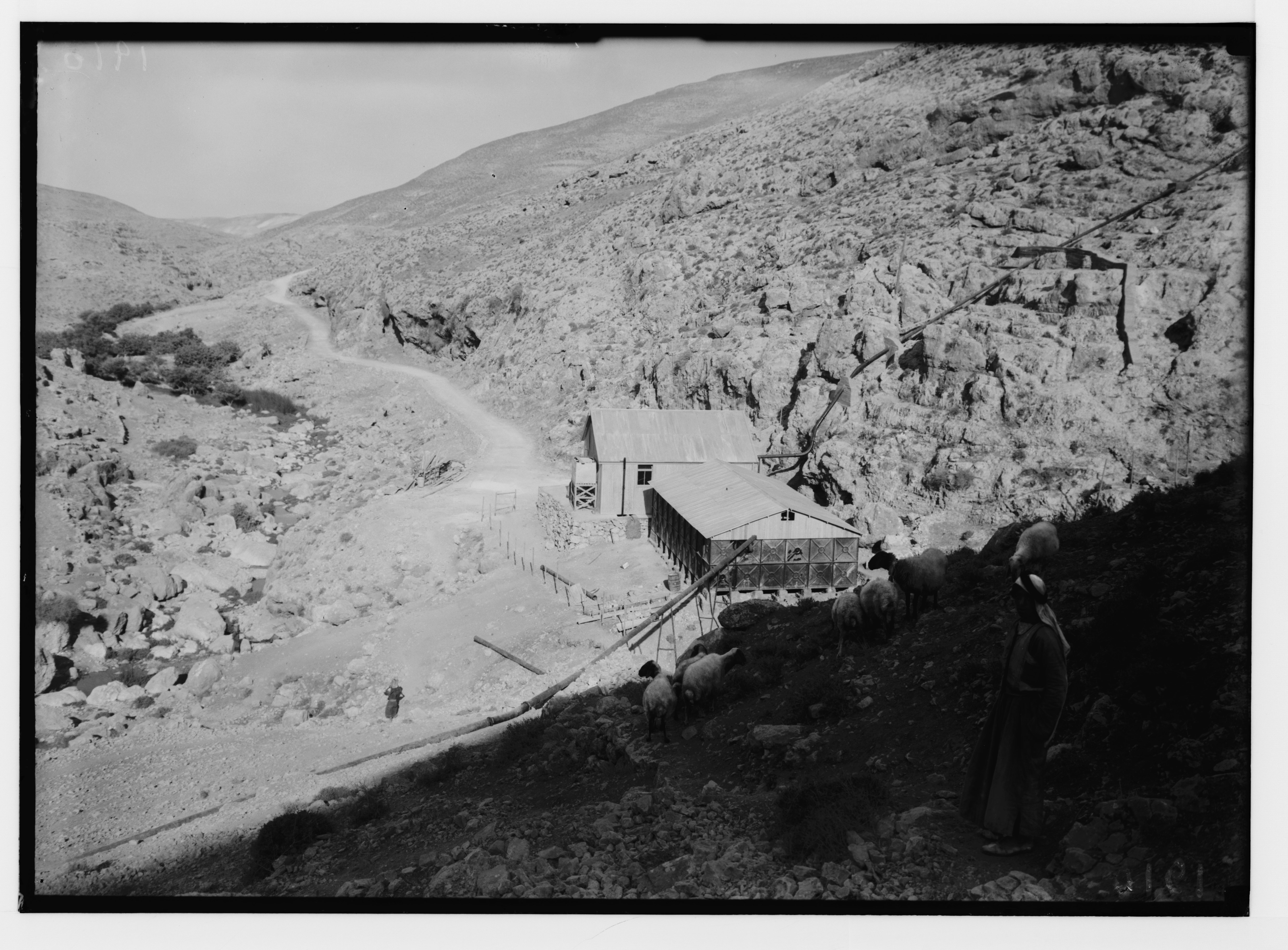
One of the three pumping stations of the Ein Farah waterworks in 1926

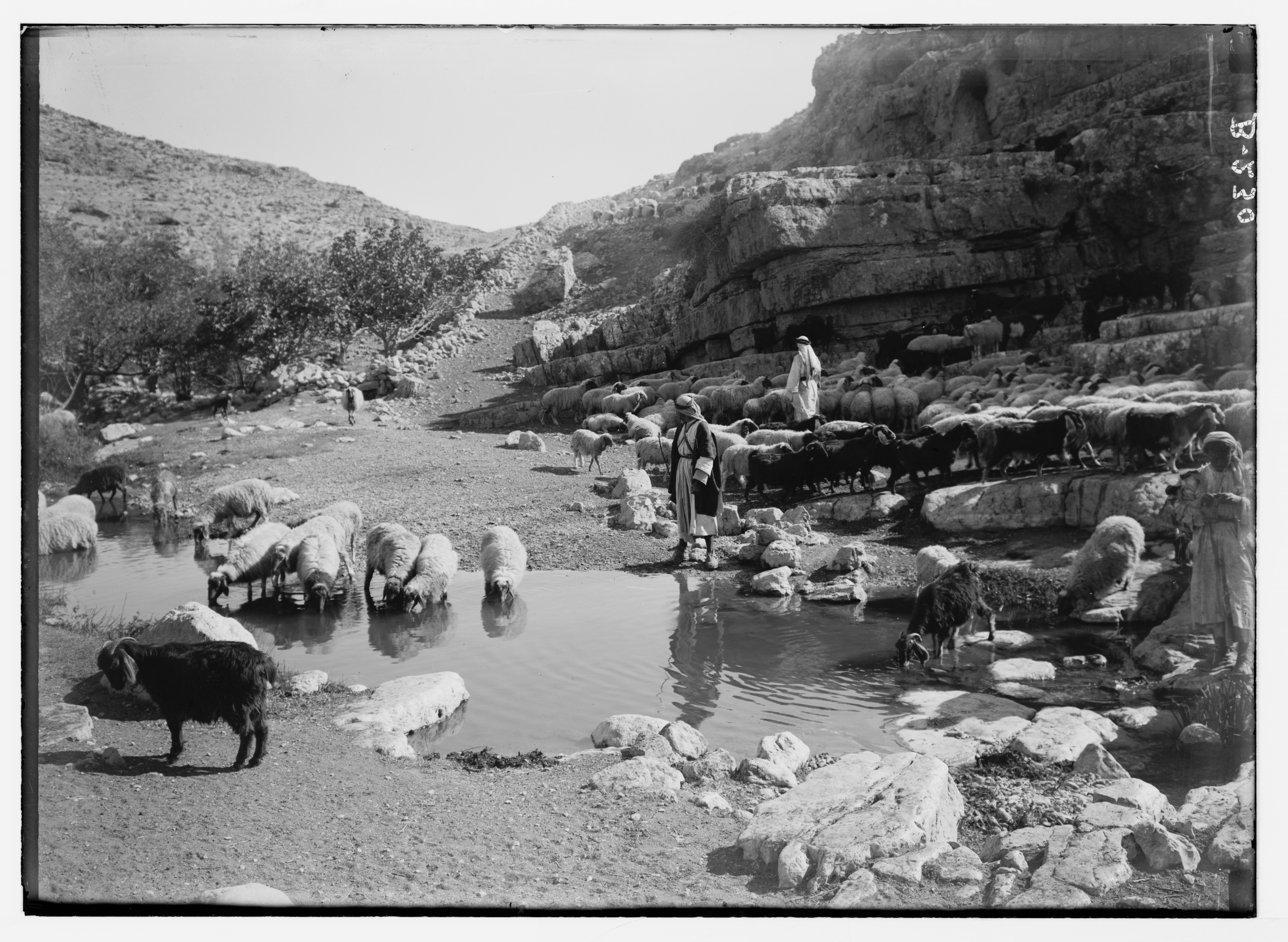
Bedouin shepherd with his flock at the spring, circa 1920

Ein Farah or 'Ayn Fara (Arabic: عين فرح), known in Hebrew as En Prat, is a spring located at the head of Wadi Qelt, 325 metres above sea level, between Jerusalem and Jericho in the West Bank. Until 1970, the water of the spring was pumped to supply Jerusalem. Since the 1970s it is part of the Israeli En Prat (upper Wadi Qelt) nature reserve. The spring flows into a natural rock pool, and its output (around 1500 m³ a day) creates a brook that flows all year round.

Ein Farah is the uppermost and largest of Wadi Qelt's three perennial springs. In Hebrew the entire stream is called Prat; in Arabic though, each sections has its own name, according to the respective spring; the upper section is called Wadi Farah after 'Ayn Farah.

The spring's water has been collected and sent downstream by aqueducts during several historical periods since antiquity, and was even used to supply water to Jerusalem, some 450 metres uphill, between 1926 and 1970.

== History ==
Ein Farah supplied water to the surrounding area since ancient times. In the Hellenistic period an aqueduct was built for the first time, to carry the water for a long distance.

=== Hellenistic and Roman periods ===
Several aqueducts have been found originating from the spring, the oldest dating to the Hasmonean period (2nd century BC). The aqueducts transported water from the spring and along the wadi to Jericho. The winter palaces of the Hasmonean kings and Herod the Great stood at the lower end of the valley, where it reaches the Plain of Jericho, at the archaeological site known as Tulul Abu el-Alayiq which contains a vast Herodian pool and several other water facilities, partially provided with water from the aqueduct.

=== Byzantine period ===
To the east of the spring the remains of aqueducts from the Byzantine period were found, and also the ruins of a flour mill.

=== Late Ottoman period ===
In the late Ottoman period the ancient aqueduct was renovated and the spring kept on supplying water to Jericho and Jordan Valley area.

In the end of the 19th century the Ottoman authorities in Palestine searched for an additional major water resource for the quick developing city of Jerusalem, and considered pumping water from Ein Farah to Jerusalem. The engineer George Franghia, an Ottoman subject of Greek origin, began a study in 1889 looking at possible new water resources for Jerusalem. His proposal was presented to the municipality in 1894. Franghia suggested to pump water from the Al-Arroub springs, about 20 km south of Jerusalem, but at a higher elevation, therefore no pumping will be required. In November 1909, a German engineer, Max Magnus published a report published in November 1909, in which he challenged the feasibility of the plan to deviate the source of the Arroub spring and argues in favor of deviating the spring at Ein Farah. The geographical location of the Ein Fara spring, 500 meters lower in altitude than Jerusalem, would have required building electric pumps to carry the water to the city, at a total budget of four million francs, double what the Franghia plan would have cost. Neither project was carried out under the Ottoman administration because of a lack of funding. On February 14, 1914, a concession agreement for the building and operation of the supply of drinking water to the city of Jerusalem was signed. The bidder awarded the contract was an Ottoman citizen, Euripide Mavrommatis, living in Galata, but due to the outbreak of First World War, the project didn't materialise.

=== British Mandate waterworks ===
Six months after the British occupied Jerusalem, following the Battle of Jerusalem in December 1917, work started on the building a water supply system from the Al-Arroub springs, a 4-inch pipe was laid to a water pool in Romema in West Jerusalem. The company started working on the Ein Farah Waterworks project in April 1926. But the amount of water supplied was not sufficient for the needs of the growing city. In February 1926 the British company Sir John Jackson Ltd. acquired the concession to supply water and electricity to the city from Euripide Mavrommatis.

The work on the Ein Farah Waterworks project included the construction of three pumping stations, a 6-inch pipeline and a water reservoir at the French Hill in Jerusalem. The work was completed on 15 July 1926. The opening ceremony, that took place on French Hill, was attended by Mayor of Jerusalem Raghib al-Nashashibi and Herbert Plumer, 1st Viscount Plumer, High Commissioners for Palestine and Transjordan.

=== After 1967 ===
The area around the spring was declared a nature reserve in 1968, was fenced and requires entry fees.

In 1970, the city Jerusalem was connected to Israel's national water system, and pumping from the spring was stopped. The remains of the Mandate-era pumping station and pipes can still be seen within the nature reserve.

The area of the nature reserve was increased to 28,000 dunam in 1988, and access of the local Bedouin shepherds to the spring has been blocked.

The cliffs around the spring are a popular climbing destination.

== Gallery ==
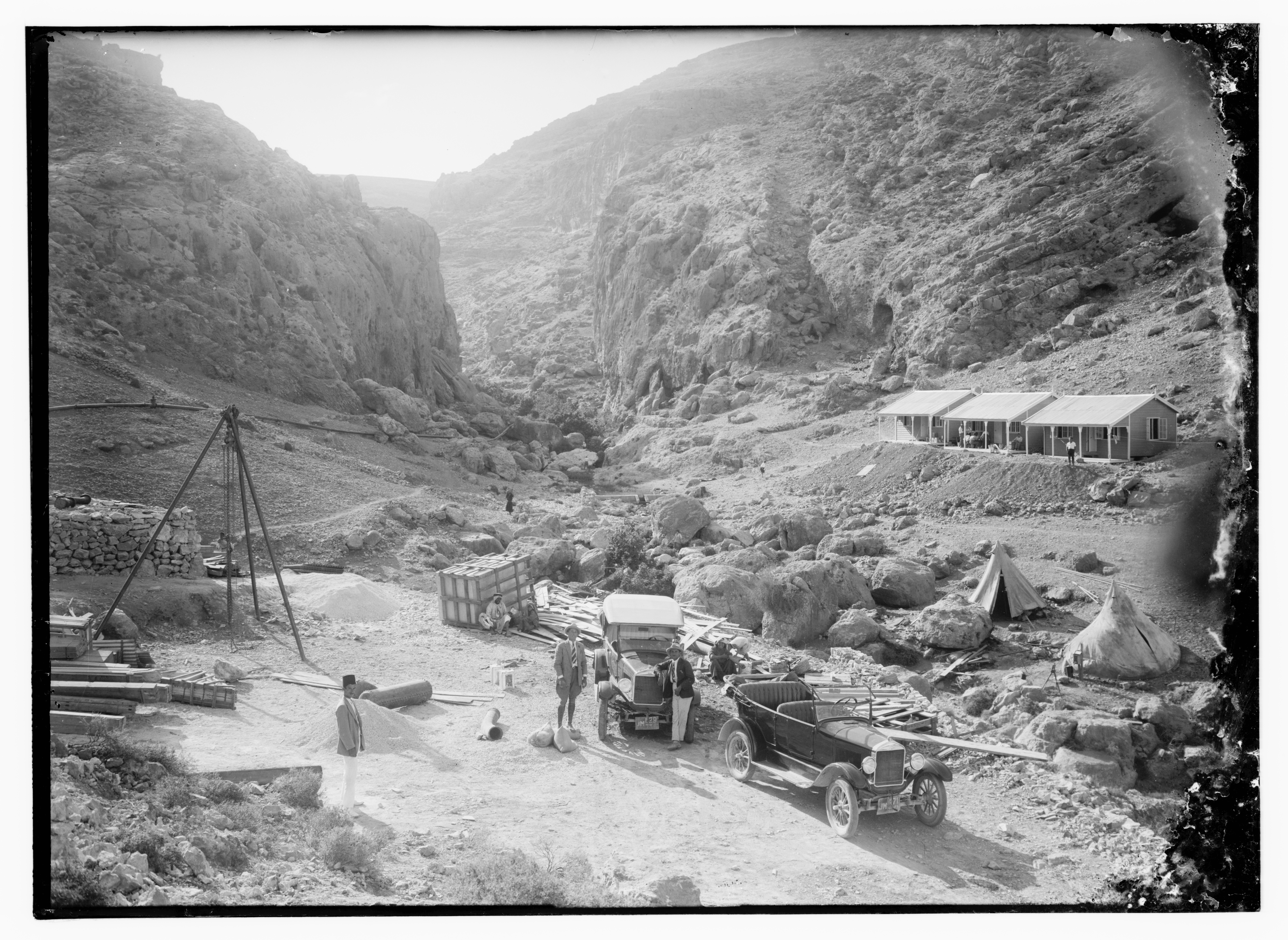
Construction of the Ein Farah Waterworks 1926

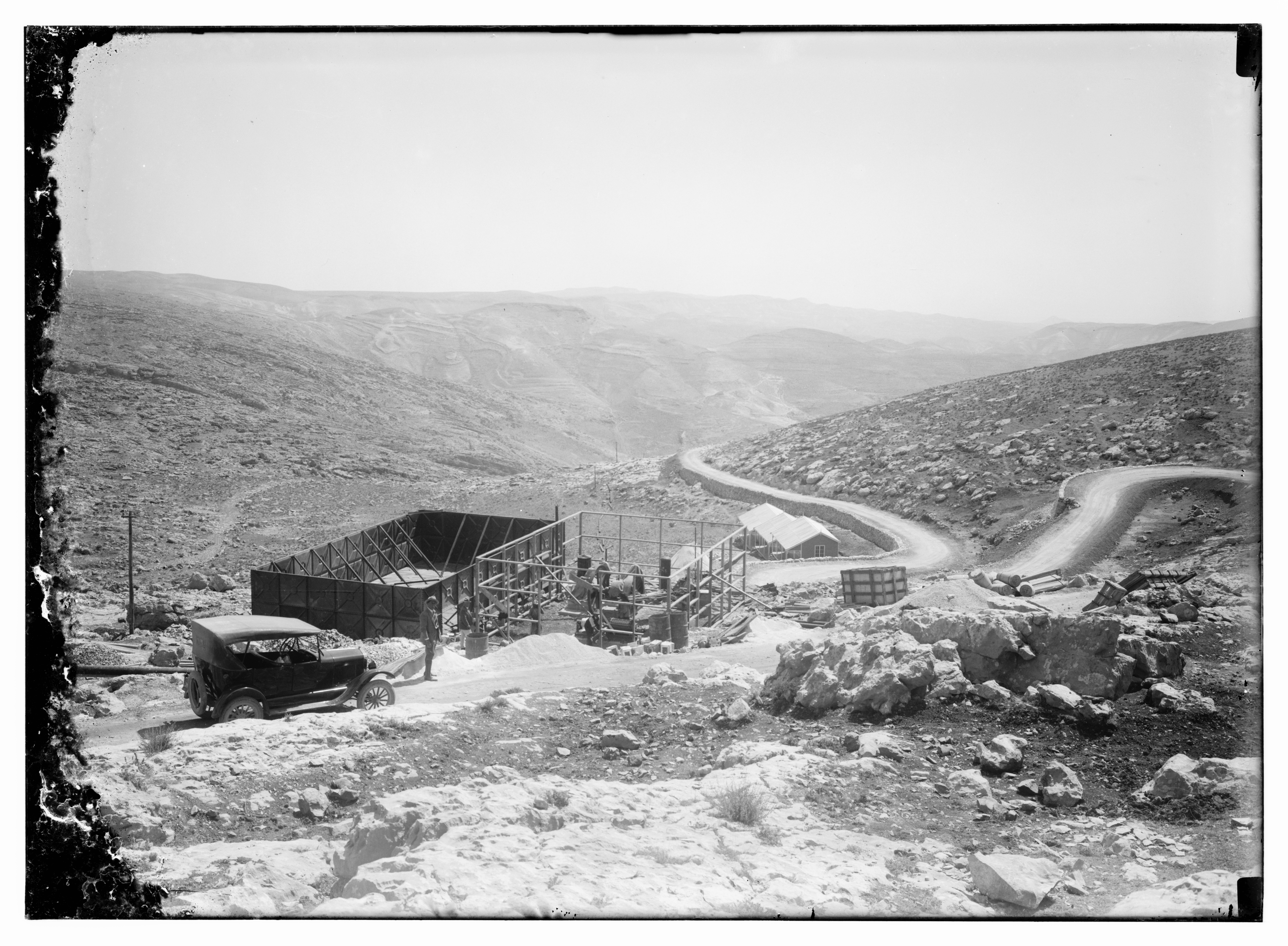
Pumping station under construction for the Ein Farah Waterworks

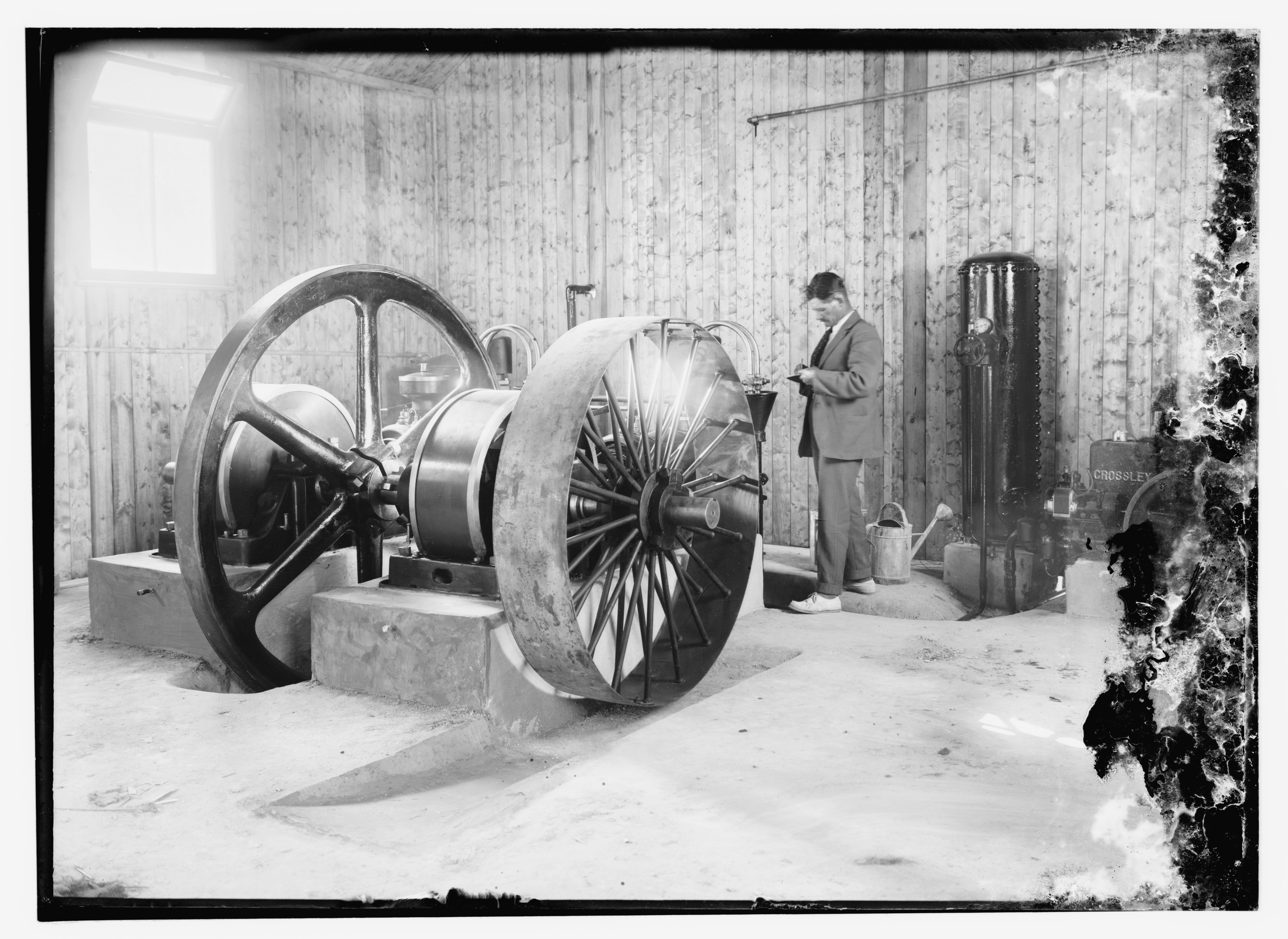
One of the Ein Farah Waterworks pumping station, shortly after completion in 1927

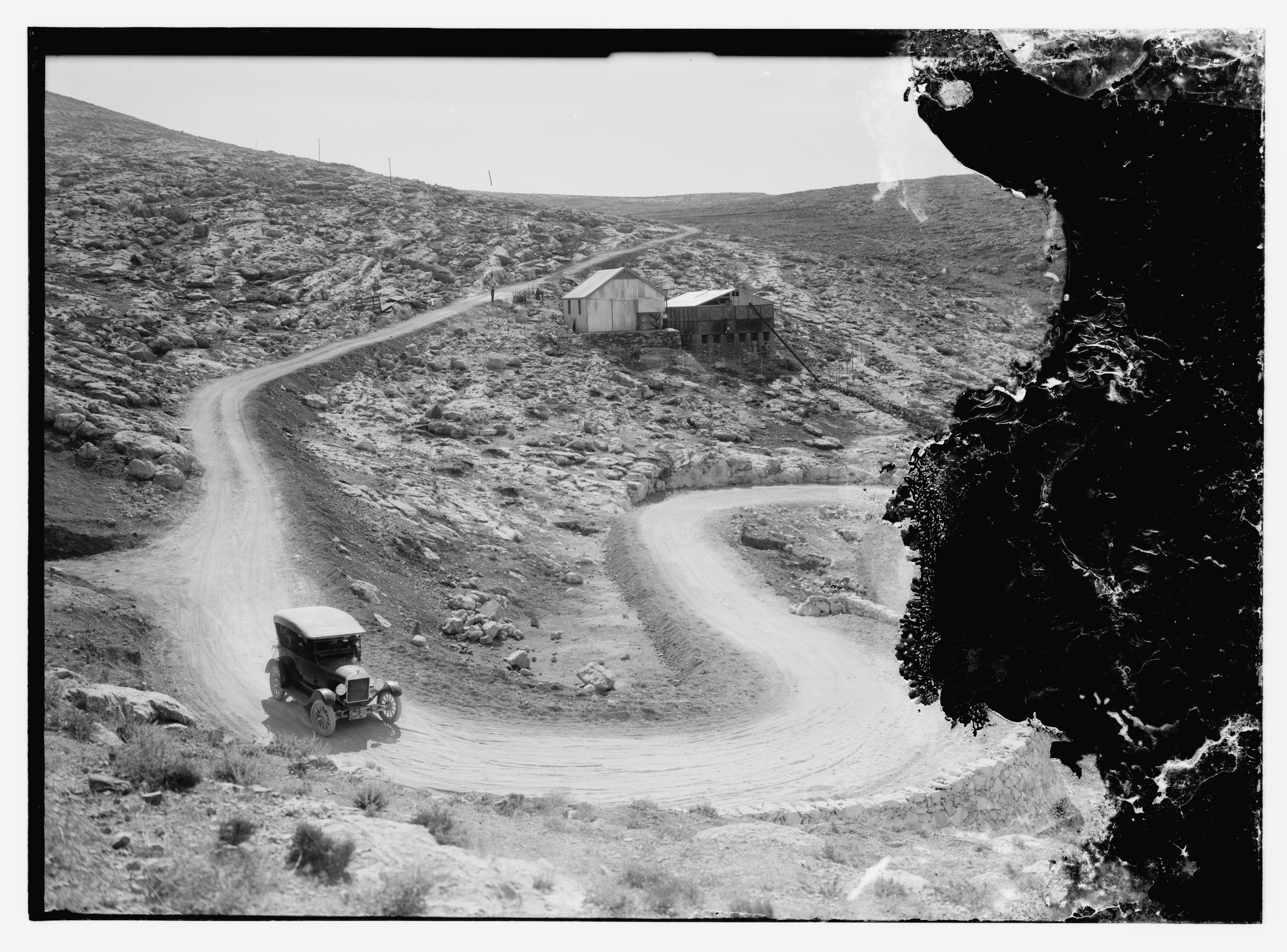
Access road that was built during work on the Ein Farah Waterworks

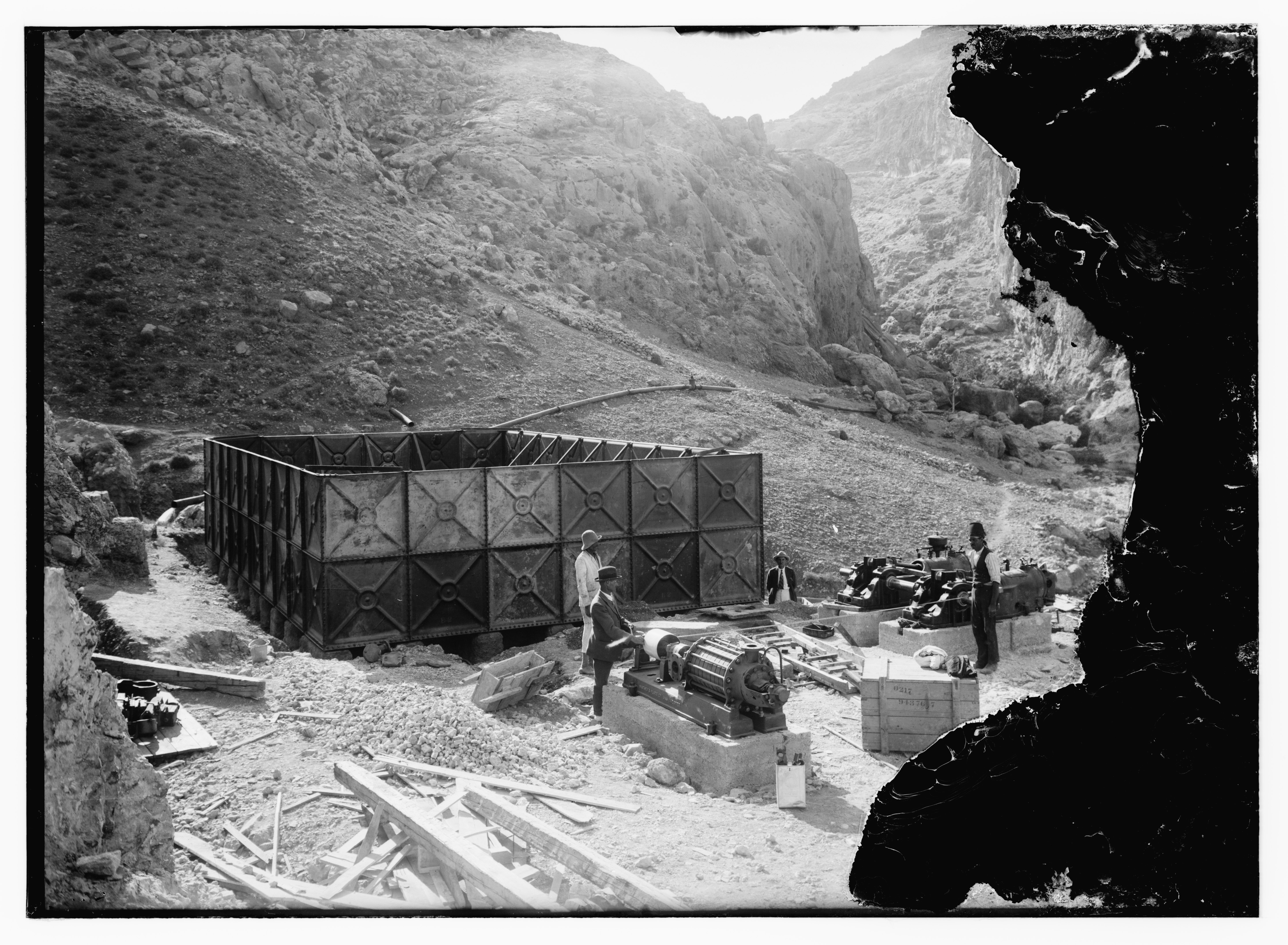
construction of a water storage tank for the Ein Farah Waterworks 1926

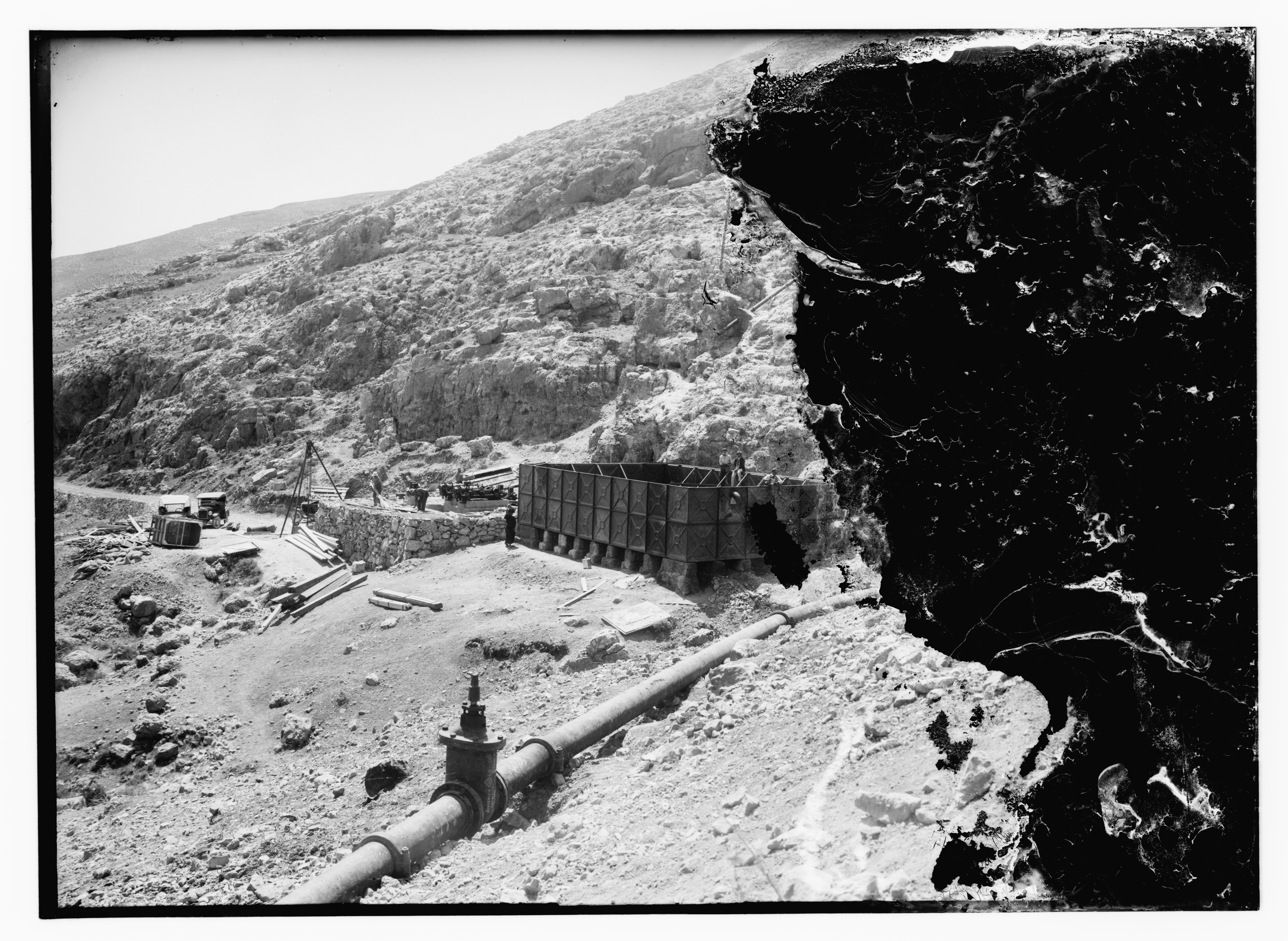
Water pipes being laid for the Ein Farah Waterworks 1926

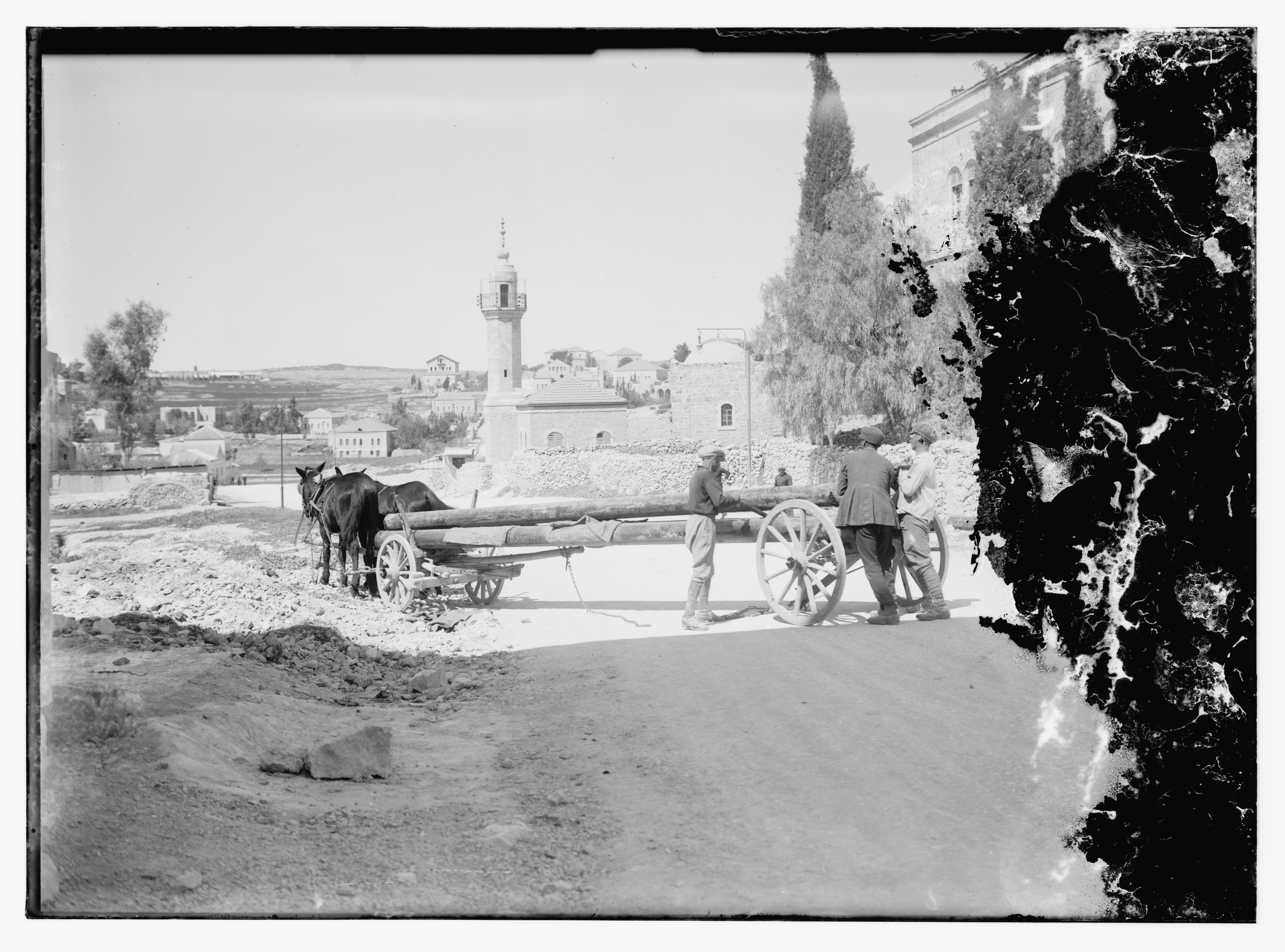
Water pipes being carried in Jerusalem for the Ein Farah Waterworks 1926

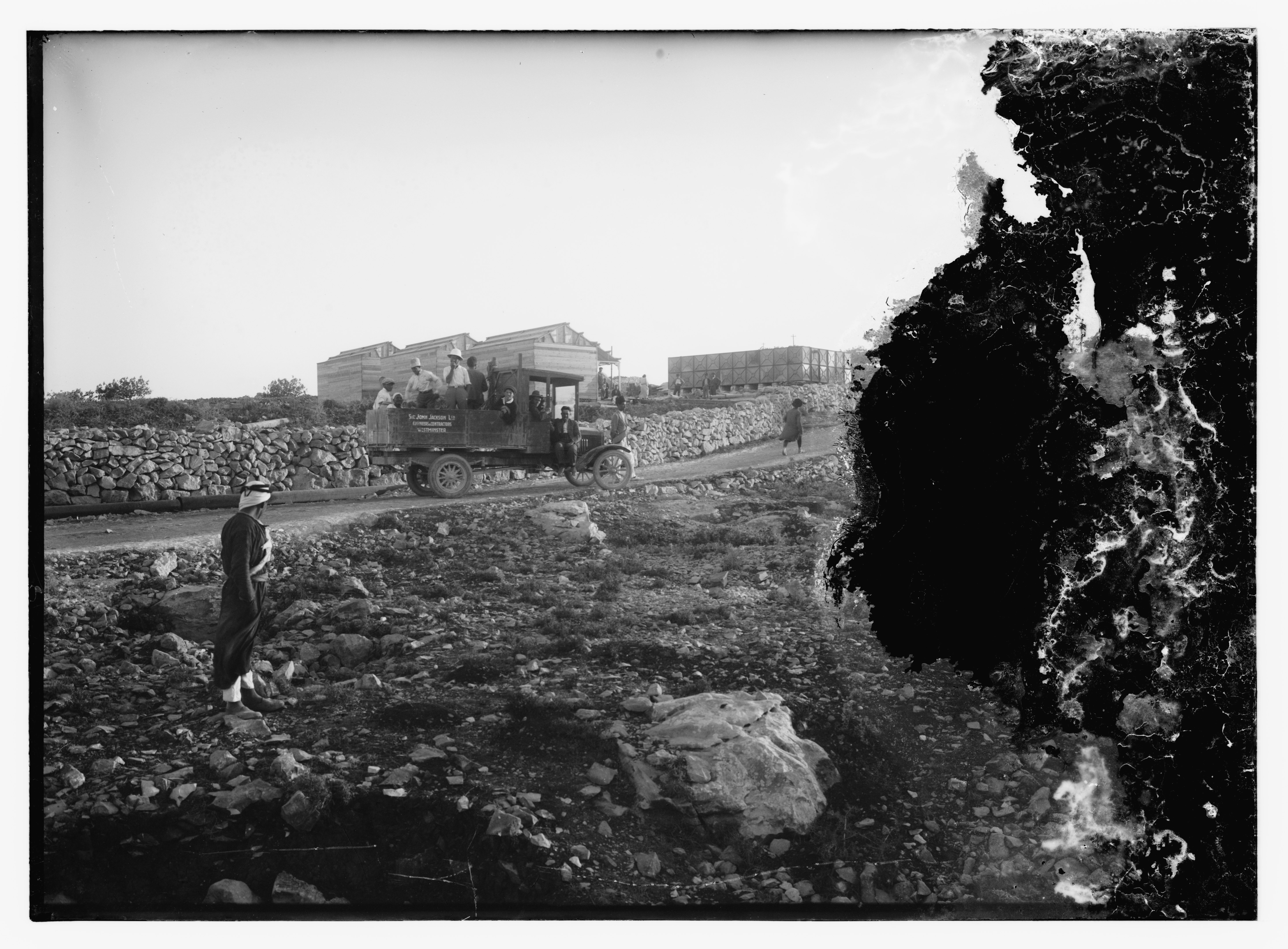
a "Sir Joh Jackson Ltd." truck during the construction of the Ein Farah Waterworks 1926

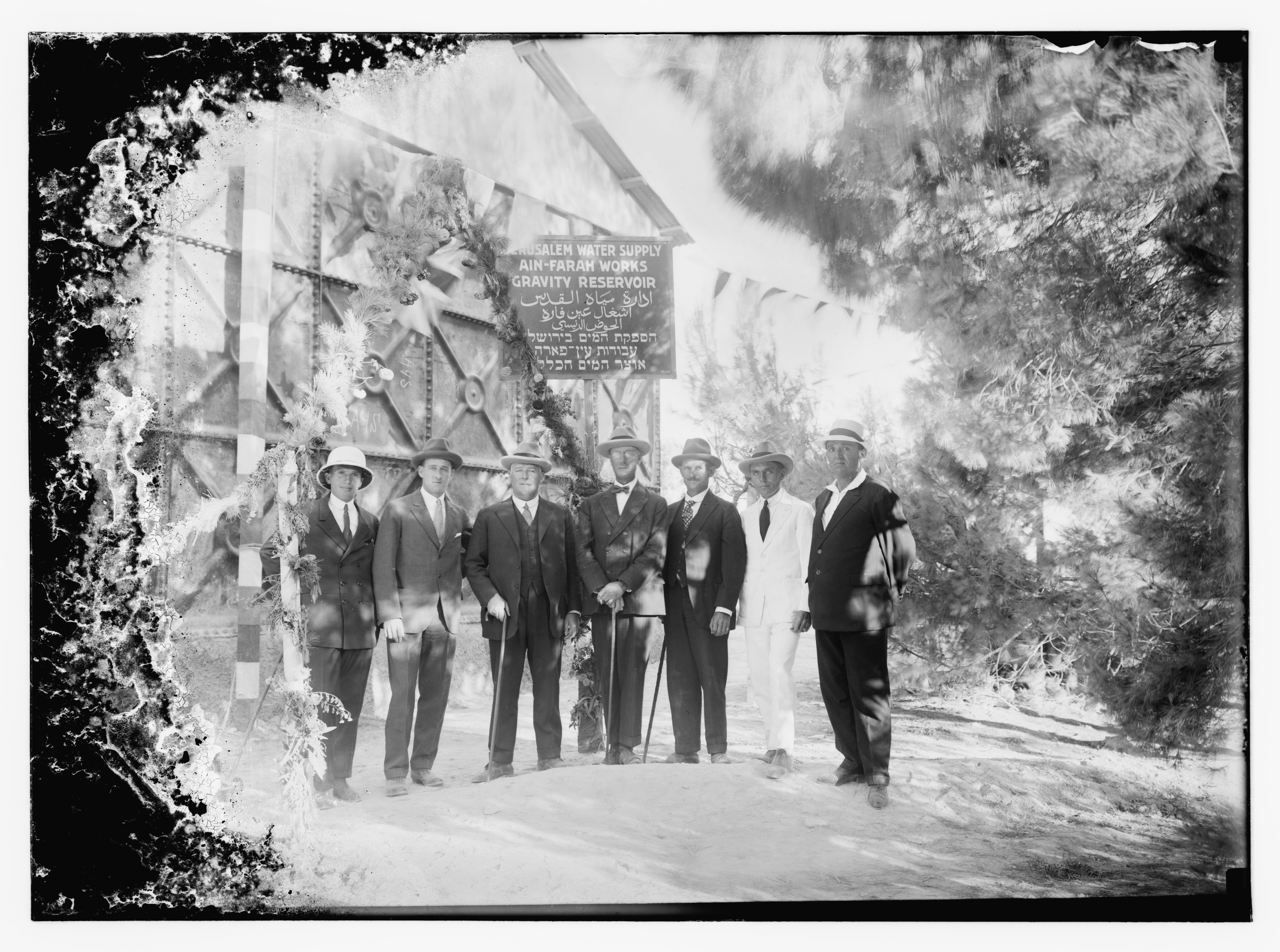
The opening ceremony of the French Hill Reservoir 15 July 1926 (The sign is in English, Arabic and Hebrew)

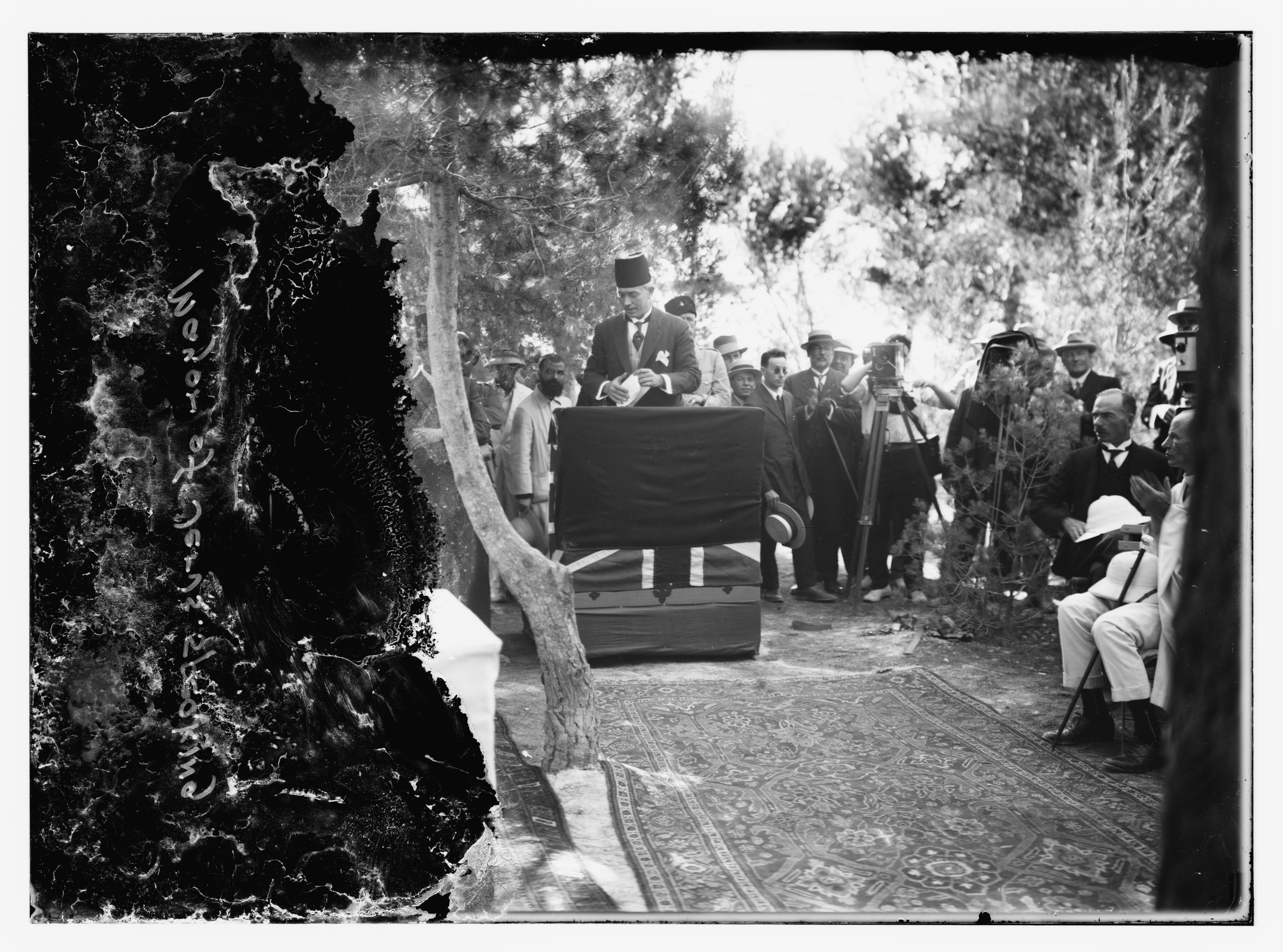
Mayor of Jerusalem Raghib al-Nashashibi at the opening ceremony

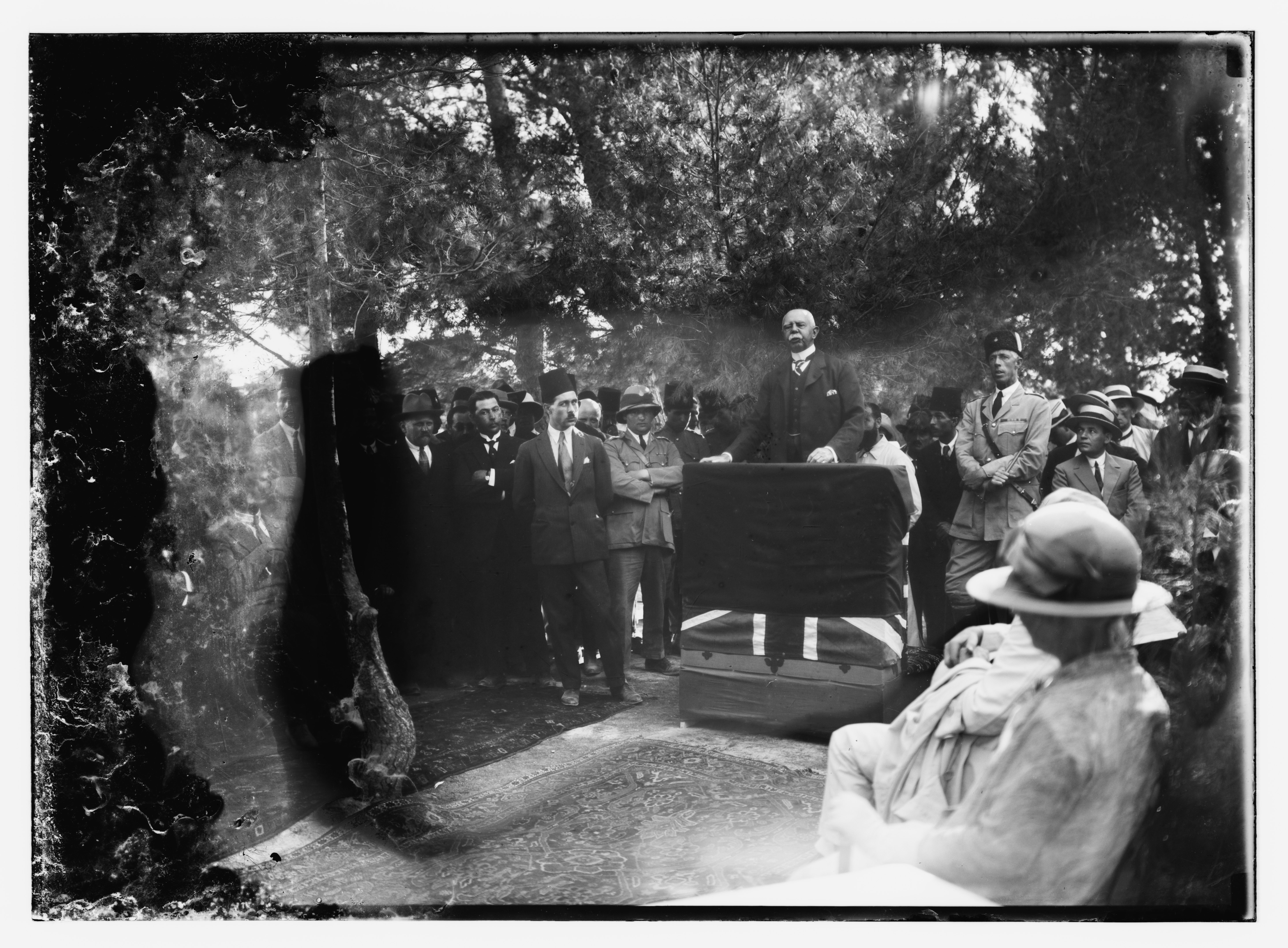
Herbert Plumer, 1st Viscount Plumer, High Commissioners for Palestine and Transjordan speaking at the opening ceremony

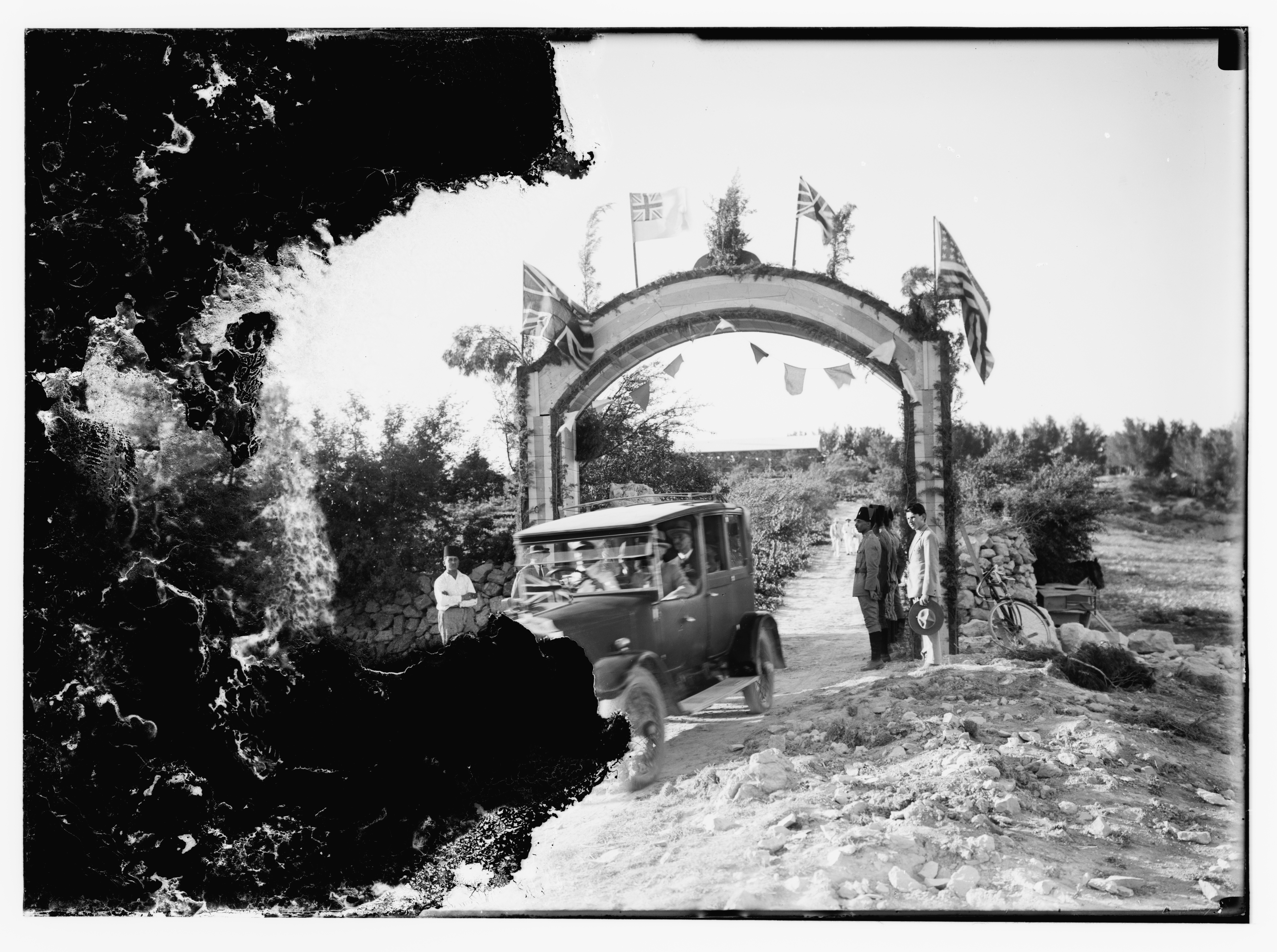
Gate erected for the opening ceremony

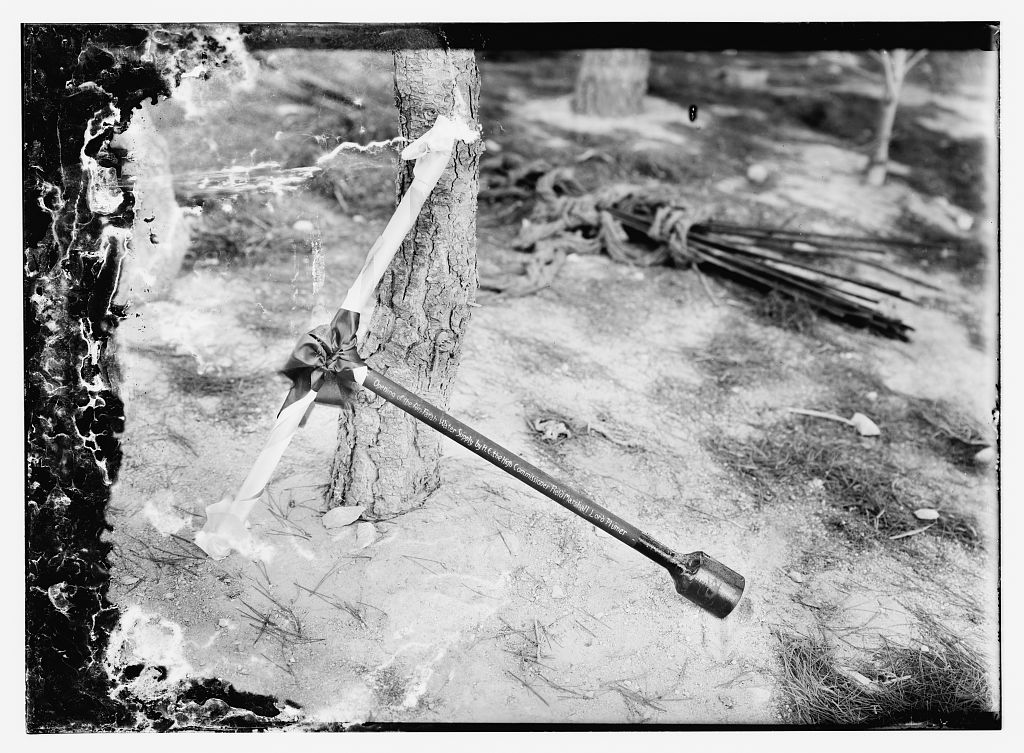
A tool used in the opening ceremony baring the name of Viscount Plumer
