= Elias Khoury (lawyer) =

Arab-Israeli Jerusalem-based lawyer

- إلياس داوود خوري
- Born: Elias Daoud Khoury; 1951 (age 74–75); Galilee
- Occupation: Lawyer

Elias Daoud Khoury (Arabic: إلياس داوود خوري, Hebrew: אליאס ח'ורי) is an Arab-Israeli Jerusalem-based lawyer. He specializes in real property law. Elias made appeals several times to the Supreme Court of Israel, and has had Palestinian politicians among his clients in Israeli courts. Elias gained fame in the 1970s when he led a legal battle against the Israeli settlers of Sebastia and Elon Moreh.

== Early life and career ==
Elias Khoury was born in the Galilee. His father lost the family land to Israel in the 1948 war, took citizenship in Israel, and believed he could work patiently through Israeli law to get his land back. Elias studied law at the Hebrew University of Jerusalem and lived in the Beit Hanina and Shuafat neighborhoods of Jerusalem.

Khoury has a practice in Jerusalem, formerly in its Eastern part and now in the West, specializing in real property law. He has represented clients at all Israeli court levels, including the Supreme Court of Israel, as well as in planning commissions.

== Terror victims in the family and activism ==
Both Khoury's father and son were killed in Palestinian terror attacks. Khoury's father, Daoud Khoury, was killed when a booby-trapped refrigerator exploded in Zion Square. Elias' son, George Khoury, was killed by gunfire on 19 March 2004, while jogging in the neighborhood of French Hill in Jerusalem. The Al Aqsa Martyrs Brigade, the military branch of the Fatah movement, claimed responsibility. After it became clear that the victim was an Arab it apologized, and offered to declare him a martyr for the Palestinian cause. "This is a barbaric act that will not change my world view, which includes deep faith in Palestinian rights," said Khoury.

In the framework of his public activities, he has expressed concerns about the impacts of the lack of Arab participation in the urban politics of Jerusalem, while expressing an understanding of the rationale. In 2008, he expressed concerns with a planned real estate deal between his own Eastern Orthodox Patriarchate of Jerusalem and the State of Israel.

On 6 March 2010, The New York Times reported that Khoury had paid to have Amos Oz's A Tale of Love and Darkness translated into Arabic and distributed in Beirut and other Arab capitals. Of his decision to pay for the translation and publication of the book, Khoury said: "This book tells the history of the rebirth of the Jewish people. We can learn from it how a people like the Jewish people emerged from the tragedy of the Holocaust and were able to reorganize themselves and build their country and become an independent people. If we can't learn from that, we will not be able to do anything for our independence."
