= 2003 French Hill suicide bombings =

Attack in East Jerusalem

- Part of the Second Intifada militancy campaign
- Location: 31°48′16.567″N 35°14′8.621″E; French Hill settlement, East Jerusalem
- Date: 18 May 2003; 5:45 am
- Attack type: Suicide bombings
- Deaths: 7 Israeli civilians (+ 1 bomber)
- Injuries: 20 Israeli civilians
- Perpetrator: Hamas claimed responsibility

Two Palestinian suicide attacks on an Egged bus occurred in the French Hill neighborhood of Jerusalem on 18 May 2003, at 5:45 AM, killing seven passengers and injuring twenty people. A few minutes after the first attack, a second suicide bomber blew himself up at the entrance to the village of Dahiya el-Barid, near Jerusalem.

== The attacks ==
The first attack took place at 5:45 am, during the morning rush hour, when a Palestinian suicide bomber disguised as a Haredi person got on the No. 6 passenger bus and detonated a nail-studded explosive belt strapped to his body on a No. 6 passenger bus. Seven civilians were killed in the attack, including four Russian immigrants and an Arab resident of Jerusalem. In addition, 20 were injured in the attack, four of them seriously.

Steve Averbach was on his way to work. Getting on the bus he noted a suspicious looking Orthodox Jew who was clean shaven and had a bulge in his jacket. Understanding that this man was a suicide bomber, he pulled his gun and then the terrorist detonated the bomb killing seven people, injuring 20. The police determined that the original intention had been to blow up the bus in the center of Jerusalem, which Averbach thwarted.

Averbach was paralyzed from the neck down. Seven years later, in 2010, he died of his wounds, bringing the total to eight people. His estate was part of the court case against Blom Bank SAL v Honickman that reached the United States Supreme Court.

A few minutes after the first attack, another suicide bomber blew himself up at the entrance to the village of Dahiya el-Barid, near Jerusalem.

== The victims ==
Seven civilians were killed and twenty were injured in the No. 6 bus. In 2010 Steve Averbach who had been seriously wounded in the suicide bombing died of his wounds.

The victims were all on their way to work:

Olga Brenner, 52, Pisgat Ze'ev; her daughter, Svetlana, was seriously injured.

Yitzhak Moyal, 64, Pisgat Ze'ev;

Nelly Perov, 55, Pisgat Ze'ev;

Marina Tsahivershvili, 44, Pisgat Ze'ev;

Shimon Ustinsky, 68, Pisgat Ze'ev;

Roni Yisraeli, 34 , Pisgat Ze'ev;

Ghalab Tawil, 42, of the Shuafat village;

Steve Averbach, 44, of Tel Aviv died on June 3, 2010, succumbing to wounds suffered in the suicide bombing. He had been paralyzed from the neck down after the bombing. His widow joined the court case suing Blom Bank for its support of terrorism in Blom Bank SAL v Honickman that reached the United States Supreme Court.

A second suicide bomber detonated his bomb when intercepted by police in northern Jerusalem. The terrorist was killed; no one else was injured.

== The perpetrator ==
Although there was no immediate claim of responsibility for the attack, relatives of 19-year-old Hamas activist Bassem Jamil Tarkrouri, who originated from Hebron, officially identified him as the perpetrator of the attack.

== Official reactions ==
Involved parties

Israel: Israeli officials spoke about the bombings, stating they "will continue to fight terror everywhere, at any time and in any way possible". Ariel Sharon cancelled a trip to the US where he was to discuss the peace "road map".

Palestinian territories:

- Palestinian National Authority – PNA officials condemned the bombings.

International

- US – Secretary of State Colin Powell spoke about the bombings, stating "we in the strongest possible terms the horrific terrorist bombing."
- Russia – Russian officials condemned the attack, and called on the international community to "intensify efforts to combat terrorism and activate peace efforts for the Mideast".

== See also ==
- French Hill attacks
- Palestinian political violence
