= 2002 French Hill suicide bombing =

Suicide bombing on 19 June 2002

Coordinates: 31°48′20″N 35°14′7″E

2002 French hill suicide bombing
- Part of the Second Intifada militancy campaign
- The attack site 2002 French Hill suicide bombing (Jerusalem District) 2002 French Hill suicide bombing (Israel)
- Location: French Hill settlement, East Jerusalem
- Date: 19 June 2002; 24 years ago c. 7:05 am
- Attack type: Suicide bombing
- Deaths: 7 (+1 suicide bomber)
- Injuries: ≈ 50
- Perpetrator: Al-Aqsa Martyrs' Brigades claimed responsibility

A suicide bombing occurred on 19 June 2002, in a crowded bus stop and hitchhiking post at the French Hill settlement in northern East Jerusalem. The site of the attack was chosen in order to cause a maximum number of casualties. Seven people were killed in the attack, and 35 were injured.

The Palestinian militant group Al-Aqsa Martyrs' Brigades claimed responsibility for the attack.

The attack took place only a day after the deadliest bombing attack in Jerusalem in six years occurred, in which a Palestinian suicide bomber killed 19 people on a crowded bus in southern Jerusalem. According to The Daily Telegraph, both of the attacks were timed to disrupt an expected announcement by U.S. President George W. Bush regarding a future Palestinian state, and Bush did in fact delay his speech.

== The attack ==
On Wednesday, shortly after 7:05 am, a Palestinian suicide bomber got out of a red Audi vehicle next to a bus station in Jerusalem's French Hill settlement.

Because the bus stop had been targeted by assailants in the past, the bus stop was heavily guarded. Two Border Police patrolmen, who were securing the site, chased the suspect to try to stop him, but the suicide bomber managed to run past them straight into the middle of a crowd of people waiting for the bus in one of the busiest bus stops in Israel. The suicide bomber detonated the explosive device that he was holding in a bag, killing seven people. About 50 additional people were injured from the force of the blast and by shrapnel that was packed around the explosive device. Eight of the wounded sustained severe injuries.

The force of the blast completely destroyed the bus station, which was made of concrete, and many body parts were scattered over a large area throughout the street near the bus station. Later, a bulldozer dismantled what was left of the concrete bus station.

The two Border Police patrolmen at the scene were wounded in the attack, one of them seriously.

== The perpetrators ==
Shortly after the attack, the Palestinian militant group Al-Aqsa Martyrs' Brigades, which publicly identifies itself as the military wing of Fatah (led at the time by Yasser Arafat), claimed responsibility for the attack during a broadcast on Lebanese television.

== Aftermath ==
According to the Daily Telegraph, both attacks carried out in Jerusalem on 18 and 19 June 2002 were timed to disrupt an expected announcement by U.S. President George W. Bush regarding a future Palestinian state, provided that the Palestinian Authority first met a series of strict conditions. White House spokesman Ari Fleischer stated that Bush would delay the plan as such, because "It's obvious that the immediate aftermath is not the right time."

=== Israeli response ===
In response to the attack, three hours after the attack took place, Israeli Air Force helicopters fired rockets at metal workshops in the Gaza Strip which were used to manufacture weapons. According to Reuters, at least five rockets were shot in Gaza City and Khan Yunis.

== Official reactions ==
Involved parties

Israel:

- Israeli government spokesman Arye Mekel referred to the attack, noting that "It is another carnage, another brutal attack on innocent people who were standing, waiting for a bus".

Palestinian territories:

- The Palestinian Authority condemned the attack. An official statement issued said, the PA "reiterates its condemnation and denunciation" of "all operations against Israeli civilians."
- Palestinian leader Yasser Arafat released a statement after the attack, which he wrote in Arabic, in which he called on Palestinians to completely stop attacks against Israelis, noting that "Targeting civilians, whether they are Israelis or Palestinians, is a deplorable act" and noting that these attacks are not a "legitimate resistance" to Israeli occupation and that Israel uses them as an excuse to invade the Palestinian territories.

== See also ==
- French Hill attacks
