= Murder of George Khoury =

Israeli murder victim

George Elias Khoury (1983 - March 19, 2004, Arabic: جورج إلياس خوري, Hebrew: ג'ורג' אליאס ח'ורי) was an Israeli Arab murdered by a Palestinian terrorist while jogging in the neighborhood of French Hill in Jerusalem. Khoury, son of Elias Khoury, a prominent lawyer, was a law student at the Hebrew University of Jerusalem.

The Al Aqsa Martyrs Brigade, the military branch of the Fatah movement, claimed responsibility for the attack. According to the New York Times, the "Palestinian gunman mistook him for a Jew." Khoury's father said, "I am against all violent attacks against innocent civilians whether it be against Israeli civilians or Palestinian civilians."

Fatah apologized and offered to declare him a martyr for the Palestinian cause. Ibrahim Kandalaft, Arafat's adviser on Christian affairs, eulogized Khoury on behalf of the PA chairman, describing him as a shaheed (martyr) of the Palestinian cause. But the victim's mother interrupted him by declaring that her son was an "angel, not a shaheed."

George's grandfather, Daoud Khoury, was also assassinated in an attack in Jerusalem, when a booby-trapped refrigerator exploded at Zion Square.

Khoury was buried in the Christian cemetery on Mount Zion.
