= French Hill (settlement) =

Israeli settlement in East Jerusalem

Coordinates: 31°48′20.52″N 35°14′20.37″E

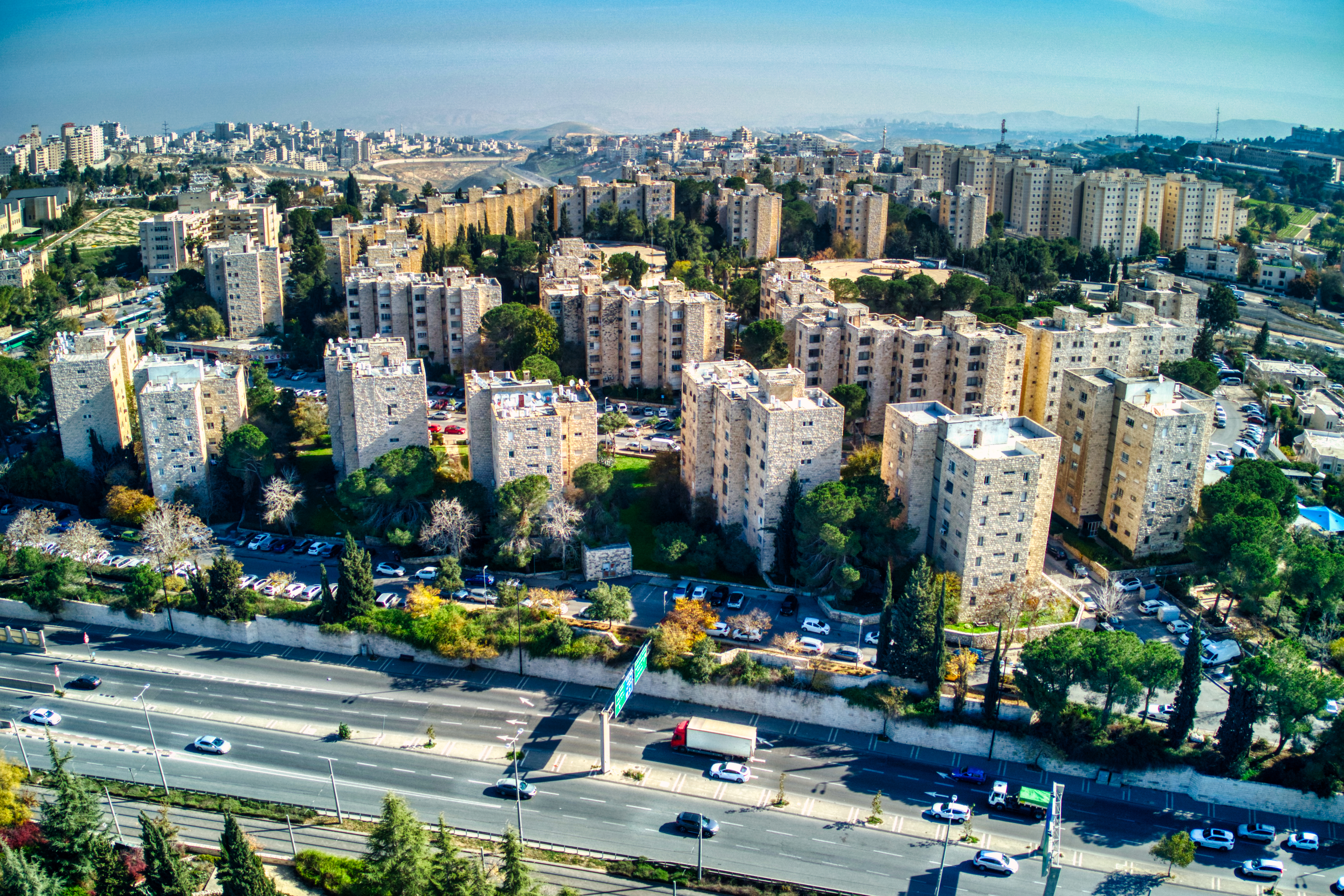
French Hill, 2022

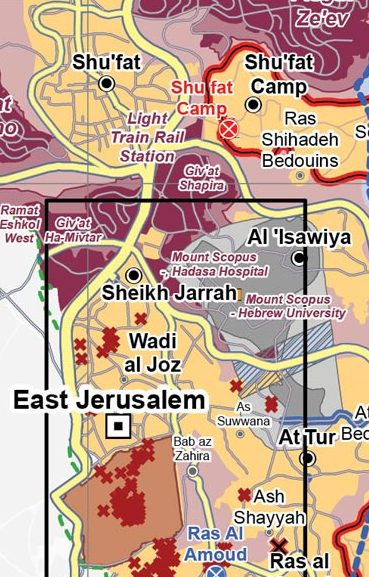
French Hill (Giv'at Shapira) in the OCHA OpT map of East Jerusalem

French Hill (Hebrew: הגבעה הצרפתית, romanized: HaGiv'a HaTzarfatit, Arabic: التلة الفرنسية, romanized: at-tel al-faransiya), also Giv'at Shapira (Hebrew: גִּבְעַת שַׁפִּירָא) (not to be confused with the moshav Givat Shapira) is an Israeli settlement in northern East Jerusalem. It is located on territory that has been occupied since the Six-Day War in 1967 and later unilaterally annexed by Israel under the 1980 Jerusalem Law. The international community considers Israeli settlements in East Jerusalem, such as French Hill, illegal under international law, which the Israeli government disputes.

== Etymology ==
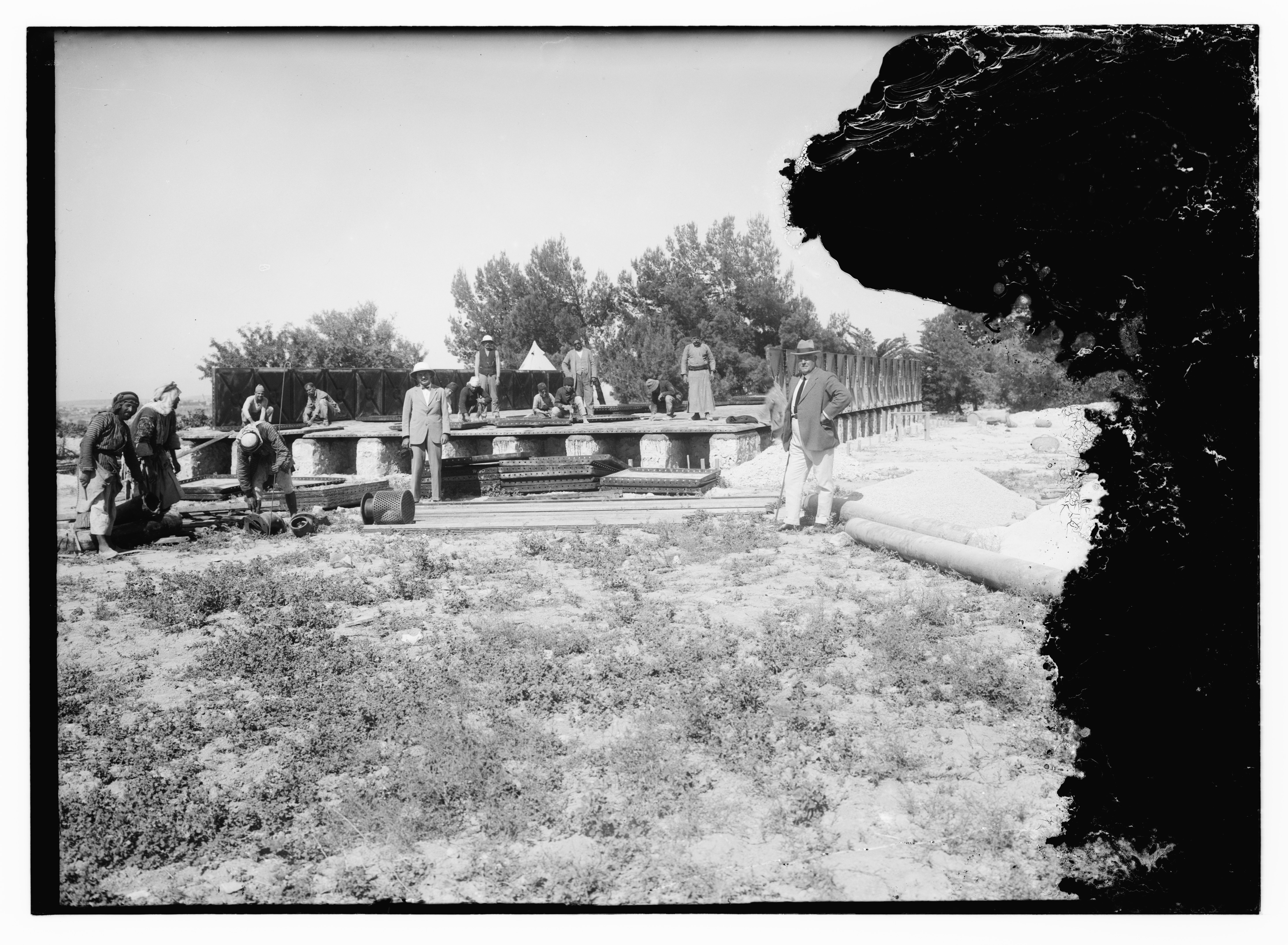
Construction work on French Hill reservoir, 1926

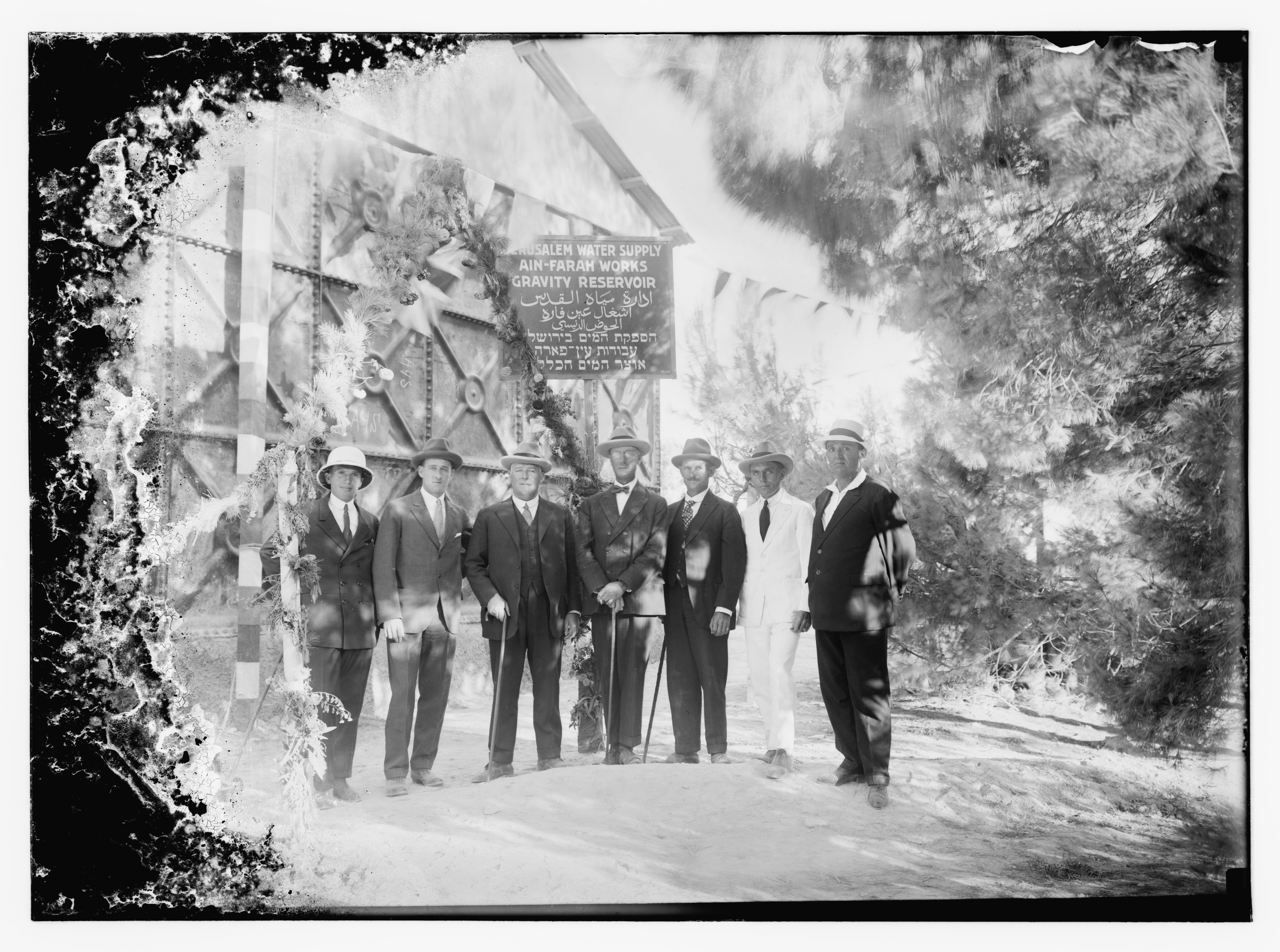
Opening ceremony of reservoir, 1926 (sign in English, Arabic and Hebrew)

The source of the name French Hill is the fact that the land belonged to the Catholic Monastery of St Anne, whose monks hailed mainly from France. In 1926 the Monastery donated a plot of land to build a reservoir to store water that was pumped from Ein Farah, to supply the city of Jerusalem. An opening ceremony was held on 15 July 1926 and the location was reported in the newspapers as "the French Hill" (at the time in Hebrew in plural - Giv'at Ha'Zorfatim).

According to local legend, it was named after a British general, John French, 1st Earl of Ypres, who is said to have had his headquarters on this 6+hill. According to this legend there was a mistake with the translation to Hebrew that named the place after the country France (in Hebrew: Tzarfat). However, French never served in this region. Had the neighborhood been named for General French, the correct name in Hebrew would have been Giv'at French.

== History ==
Under the proposed United Nations Partition Plan for Palestine of 1947, French Hill to be part of a Corpus Separatum (Jerusalem) belonging to neither the proposed Jewish nor Arab State. In 1950 Jordan officially annexed the area, which was only recognized by the UK, Iraq and Pakistan.

Under Jordanian rule, the area (Arabic: Karm el-Wiz) became a military outpost. According to Palestinian historian Walid Khalidi, a small number of Palestinians from Lifta moved to the area prior to 1967.

In late 2010 documents leaked by Al Jazeera indicated that French Hill was one of the areas that the Palestinian Authority had agreed would be ceded to Israel.

According to ARIJ, Israel confiscated land from the following Palestinian neighbourhoods/villages in order to construct French Hill in 1968:

- 394 dunams from Isawiya,
- 394 dunams from Shuafat.

In 1969, construction began on a new residential neighborhood to create a land link between West Jerusalem and the Hebrew University on Mount Scopus, which had been an Israeli enclave in Jordanian territory before the war. The official name of the new neighborhood was Giv'at Shapira.

Then prime minister Levi Eshkol envisioned French Hill as the "first planned urban community in modern Jerusalem." In 2014, it was described as a clean, quiet neighborhood with bicycle trails, parks, fitness centers, a community center and many synagogues.

Another section of French Hill, Tzameret HaBira, was populated by American immigrants.

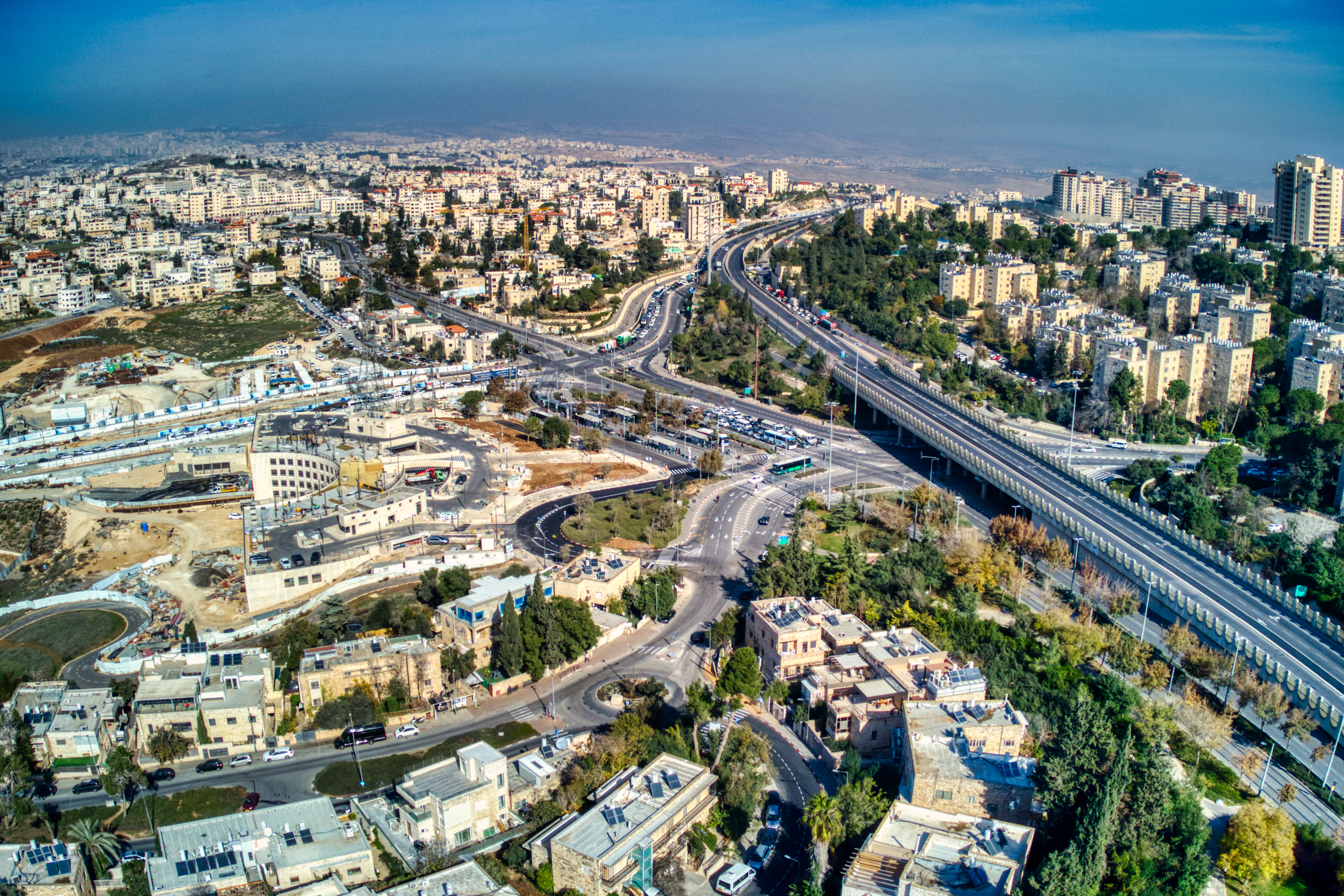
View of French Hill junction

French Hill junction is one of the busiest junctions in Jerusalem, with tens of thousands of vehicles passing through it daily. As part of the French Hill tunnels project being implemented by the Jerusalem Municipality and the Ministry of Transportation, four tunnels are being built to ease the traffic congestion for residents travelling into the city.

== Demographics ==
In 2002–2003, French Hill had a population of 6,631. Giv'at Shapira had a population density of 10.9 persons per dunam (10,900 people/km^{2}), while Tzameret HaBira was less crowded, with 4.7 persons per dunam (4,700 people/km^{2}). The population is mostly Jewish, including a large number of immigrants from South America and the former Soviet Union. In recent years, an increasing number of Arabs, including some from outside Jerusalem, have been buying apartments in the neighborhood. The neighborhood has also seen a large influx of Orthodox Jews. The ethnic mix is much more diverse than in most other Jewish areas in the city, partly due to the proximity of the Hebrew University and Hadassah Hospital on Mount Scopus. There is also a large population of journalists, diplomats, and consular staff, due to its easy access to major thoroughfares to other parts of the country.

== Schools and religious institutions ==
French Hill has 9 synagogues. One of them, Kehillat Ramot Zion (Hebrew: קהילת רמות ציון), is a Masorti congregation. The first elementary school in Israel run by the movement, the Frankel School, was established in Givat Shapira (French Hill).

== Economy ==
The Dan Jerusalem Hotel, originally the Hyatt Regency, has 502 guestrooms and suites, making it Jerusalem's largest hotel. The terraced structure was designed by Israel Prize-winning architect David Resnick.

== Arab-Israeli conflict ==
The French Hill intersection which connects northern Jerusalem to Maale Adumim and the Dead Sea was the site of eleven Palestinian terror attacks from 2002 to 2017. The heaviest casualties were in 2002 and 2003, with 7 deaths each time.

According to an article by the U.S. News & World Report, "the busy thoroughfare, which divides the Jewish neighborhood of French Hill from the Arab neighborhood of Shuafat, is the most accessible corner in the city for a West Bank terrorist looking for a crowd of Israelis."

In 2004, members of the al-Aqsa Martyrs' Brigade shot and killed George Khoury, an Israeli Arab economics student, while he was jogging in French Hill, having mistaken him for a Jew.

== Archaeology ==
A 2,700 year old citadel with an open courtyard and rooms on both sides was discovered at the end of the 1960s on a hilltop on French Hill. Archaeologists believe it was part of a series of citadels built to guard Jerusalem during the First Temple Period. A salvage dig in 1970-1971 unearthed late Hellenistic and Herodian tombs. One of the 13 ossuaries discovered was inscribed with the name "Yehosef (Joseph) ben Haggai."

== Notable residents ==
- Yonit Levi
- Jeff Seidel
- Yossi Klein Halevi
