= Koyamada =

Koyamada (written: 小山田 lit. "Small hill field") is a Japanese surname. Notable people with the surname include:

- Dai Koyamada (小山田 大, born 1976), Japanese rock climber
- Shin Koyamada (小山田 真, born 1982), American actor
- Koyamada clan, Japanese clan

== See also ==
- Koyamada International Foundation, an international non-governmental organization
- Oyamada (小山田), Japanese surname using the same kanji
