= Ai No Shizuku =

- Genre: TV special
- Starring: Shin Koyamada
- Country of origin: Japan
- Original language: Japanese

Production
- Executive producer: Takenori Kanzaki
- Production location: Okayama
- Production companies: Okayama Prefecture; Dentsu

Original release
- Network: NHK
- Release: November 2010 – December 2010

Ai No Shizuku (愛の雫) was a two-hour Broadway style stage production at the opening ceremony of The 25th National Cultural Festival Okayama 2010 that aired nationally multiple times as a Japanese TV special on NHK in 2010.

== Cast ==
- Shin Koyamada as Seinen Makibi
- Chika Kanô as Shizuku
- Mao Eguchi as Arashi
- Yu Funaki as Arashi
- Miki Hayashi as Arashi
- Serina Hayashi as Arashi
- Erika Inukai as Arashi
- Takuro Kashino as Arashi
- Mayumi Kataoka as Arashi
- Kanako Katayama as Arashi
- Sayo Kawaguchi as Arashi
- Sayaka Kawakami as Arashi
- Ayumi Kiguchi as Arashi
- Kazusa Matsuyama as Arashi
- Akiko Miyake as Arashi
- Nao Miyake as Arashi
- Sayaka Motoi as Arashi
- Mari Murakami as Arashi
- Miyuki Nishiyama as Arashi
- Yuki Nose as Arashi
- Kana Oguchi as Arashi
- Chie Otsubo as Arashi
- Chinatsu OtsuboArashi
- Mayuka Takimoto as Arashi
- Nao Tanabe as Arashi
- Kouga Tsuchitani as Arashi
- Miyuki Ueshima as Arashi
- Wataru Yabe as Arashi
- Kenta Yamamoto as Arashi
- Hiromi Yoshida as Arashi
- Natsumi Yoshikawa as Arashi

== Production ==
=== Casting ===
The story of show was based on the history of Okayama Prefecture so all of the cast and performers were selected from those who were based in Okayama or from Okayama. The executive producers and the representatives of the Okayama Prefectural Government were considering a list of famous Japanese actors and celebrities from Okayama Prefecture, including Shin Koyamada, Joe Odagiri, Koshi Inaba and many others for the starring character Seinen Makibi. After the long period of examinations, Koyamada was chosen to star by the executive producers and Okayama Prefecture Governor Masahiro Ishii who was also a chairman of the executive committee of the production, although Koyamada is from Okayama, but resides in Hollywood. During the production in 2010, Koyamada was officially appointed as an International Goodwill Ambassador of the Okayama Prefectural Government by the then-Governor Masahiro Ishii. The female co-star was appointed to Chika Kanô, a former veteran Takarazuka Revue.

=== Preparation ===
The development of the show took over 10 years because of the budget issue of the Okayama Prefecture, but eventually got it approved by the governor and Okayama Prefectural Assembly and greenlit by the co-host Agency for Cultural Affairs. Kanzaki Takenori was appointed as the executive producer for the show. Since Koyamada has been based in Los Angeles, he had to fly back and forth to Okayama Prefecture to rehearse his scenes with other local casts and promote the show through commercials and events in Japan. The famous national dance champion team of the Sōja Minami Senior High School based in Sōja, Okayama was brought in to rehearse with Koyamada, who had to incorporate his martial arts movements with their dancing calligraphy for their scenes together.

=== Distribution ===
The show was first aired live nationally on NHK on October 30, 2010, and rebroadcast multiple times after that on NHK because it was well received. Okayama Prefecture has produced the DVD and distributed to those who were involved in the show.

== See also ==
- The National Cultural Festival
- The 25th National Cultural Festival Okayama 2010
