= Kif =

KIF may refer to:

- Koyamada International Foundation (KIF), an international nonprofit organization
- KIF Kolding, a handball club in Denmark
- Kristiansand IF, a handball and athletics club in Norway
- Kif Kroker, a character in the TV show Futurama
- Kingfisher Lake Airport, Ontario, Canada
- Knowledge Interchange Format, in computing
- Københavns Idræts Forening, athletics club in Denmark
- an alien race in the Chanur novels by C. J. Cherryh
- Kinesin superfamily protein
- KIF, a file format used for saving full games of shogi

== See also ==
- Kief
