= The Dreamhoppers =

American comic book series

- official cover

Publication information
- Publisher: Laizen Comics
- Genre: Superhero
- Publication date: September 2009
- No. of issues: 1
- Main character(s): Ren Matsuo; Morgan Fisher; Tyler McMullen; Lucy Hawkins; Peter Hawkins; Xibalba; Haru Matsuo; Lula

Creative team
- Created by: Shin Koyamada; Nia Lyte; Travis Moore
- Written by: Travis Moore; Shin Koyamada (story by); Nia Lyte (story by)
- Artist(s): Travis Moore
- Penciller(s): Travis Moore
- Colorist(s): Travis Moore

Collected editions
- The Dreamhoppers: ISBN 978-0-578-06575-5

The Dreamhoppers is an American comic book series illustrated and written by Travis Moore who also illustrated DC Comics' Freedom Fighters, Justice Society of America, Wonder Woman, Titan, The Green Team, Sword of Sorcery. The Dreamhoppers were a group of fictional superhero characters that appeared in comic books published by Laizen Comics.

== Main story ==
Evolving from their harmonious fascination with the synchronicity between the dream world, real world and the Universe, Dreamhoppers is an action adventure about the supernatural powers given to certain people known as Dreamhoppers. These guardians of the Dreamworld can transform their human forms into fantasy characters and enter dreams in order to save one from the evils in the Dreamworld.

== Development ==
In 2008, Shin Koyamada and Nia Lyte teamed up with graphic comic artist Travis Moore who later worked DC Comics projects Superman, Wonder woman and Freedom Fighter to begin fleshing out the story and characters for the Dreamhoppers.

== Distribution ==
The Dreamhoppers was distributed by independent comic stores in three US States, including Meltdown Comics, House of Secrets, Flipside Comics, Comickaze Comics Books, Galactic Comics, On Comic Ground, Rising Sun Creations, San Diego Comics & Collectibles, Southern California Comics, Comix Experience in California; Alternate Reality Comics, Comic Oasis, Wishing Well Comics, Avatar Comics and Games in Nevada; as well as St. Mark's Comics in New York City.

== See also ==
- American comics
- American comics creators
- Comics publishing companies
