= Heart of the Dragon =

Heart of the Dragon may refer to:

- Heart of Dragon
- Heart of the Dragon (American TV series)
- Heart of the Dragon (British TV series)
- "Heart of the Dragon" (Iron Fist)
