= Shinobi Pictures =

American entertainment company

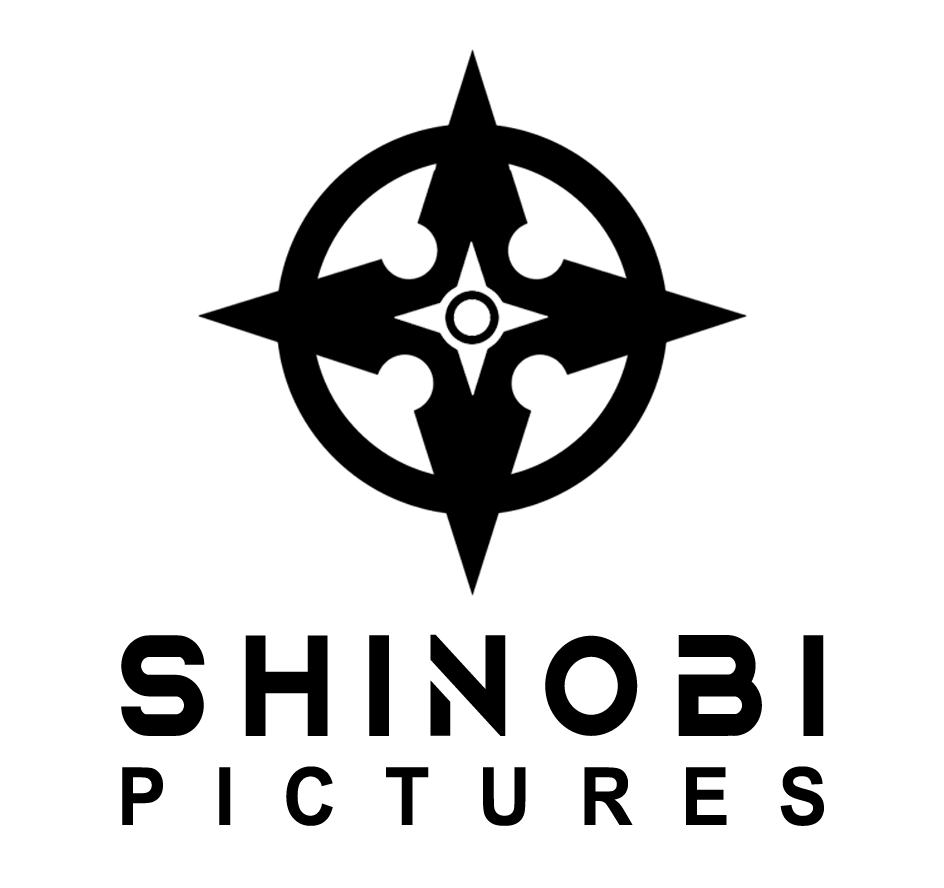
- Type: private
- Industry: entertainment, motion picture
- Founder: Shin Koyamada; Nia Lyte
- Headquarters: Hollywood, CA
- Area served: worldwide
- Services: film production
- Website: shinobipictures.com

Shinobi Pictures, is an international media and entertainment company, established by Shin Koyamada and Nia Lyte in October 2005 to develop and produce films and television shows. It was formally known as Shinca Pictures.

In 2021, the company developed and produced the award-winning short film Shadow Glass, written and directed by Jay Lee (Sony Pictures's Zombie Strippers), which won in the categories of the "Best Indie Short" and "Best Actress In An Indie Film" at the Los Angeles Film Festival and "Best Indie Film" at the New York Film Awards.

== Film ==
Year	Title	Director	Distributor	Notes
2007	Good Soil	Craig Shimahara	R.A.G.E. Media/Christian-Samurai.com	Co-production with Endurance Productions
2013	Heart of the Dragon	Jeff McDonald	Shinobi Pictures	
2022	Shadow Glass	Jay Lee	Shinobi Pictures	
2023	The Yokai King	Yuji Makino	Shinobi Pictures	Co-production with Goodwin

== Television ==
Year	Title	Types	Network	Notes
2006	Wine Road of the Samurai	Television documentary film	Japan News Network, Tokyo Broadcasting	Production with Sanyo Broadcasting
2013	Spirit Fashion	Miniseries	Spirit Show Network	
2014	The Yokai King	Series	Shinobi Pictures	Co-Production with Okinawa Entertainment Studio
2014	Spirit Earth	Miniseries	Spirit Show Network	
2014	Spirit Love	Miniseries	Spirit Show Network	
2014	Spirit Music	Miniseries	Spirit Show Network	
2014	Spirit Art	Miniseries	Spirit Show Network	

== Awards ==
Award	Year	Location	Title	Category	Result
Los Angeles Film Awards	2021	United States	Shadow Glass	Best Indie Short	Won
Los Angeles Film Awards	2021	United States	Shadow Glass	Best Actress In An Indie Film	Won
New York Film Awards	2021	United States	Shadow Glass	Best Indie Film	Won
Cannes World Film Festival	2021	France	Shadow Glass	Best Psychological Film	Won
Canada Shorts Film Festival	2021	Canada	Shadow Glass	Best Picture	Finalist
Tokyo International Shorts Film Festival	2021	Japan	Shadow Glass	Best Picture	Finalist
Hollywood Independent Filmmaker Awards and Festival	2021	United States	Shadow Glass	Best Picture	Official Selection
Hong Kong International Short Film Festival	2021	Hong Kong	Shadow Glass	Best Picture	Official Selection
Kalakari International Film Festival	2021	India	Shadow Glass	Best Picture	Official Selection
