= Children in emergencies and conflicts =

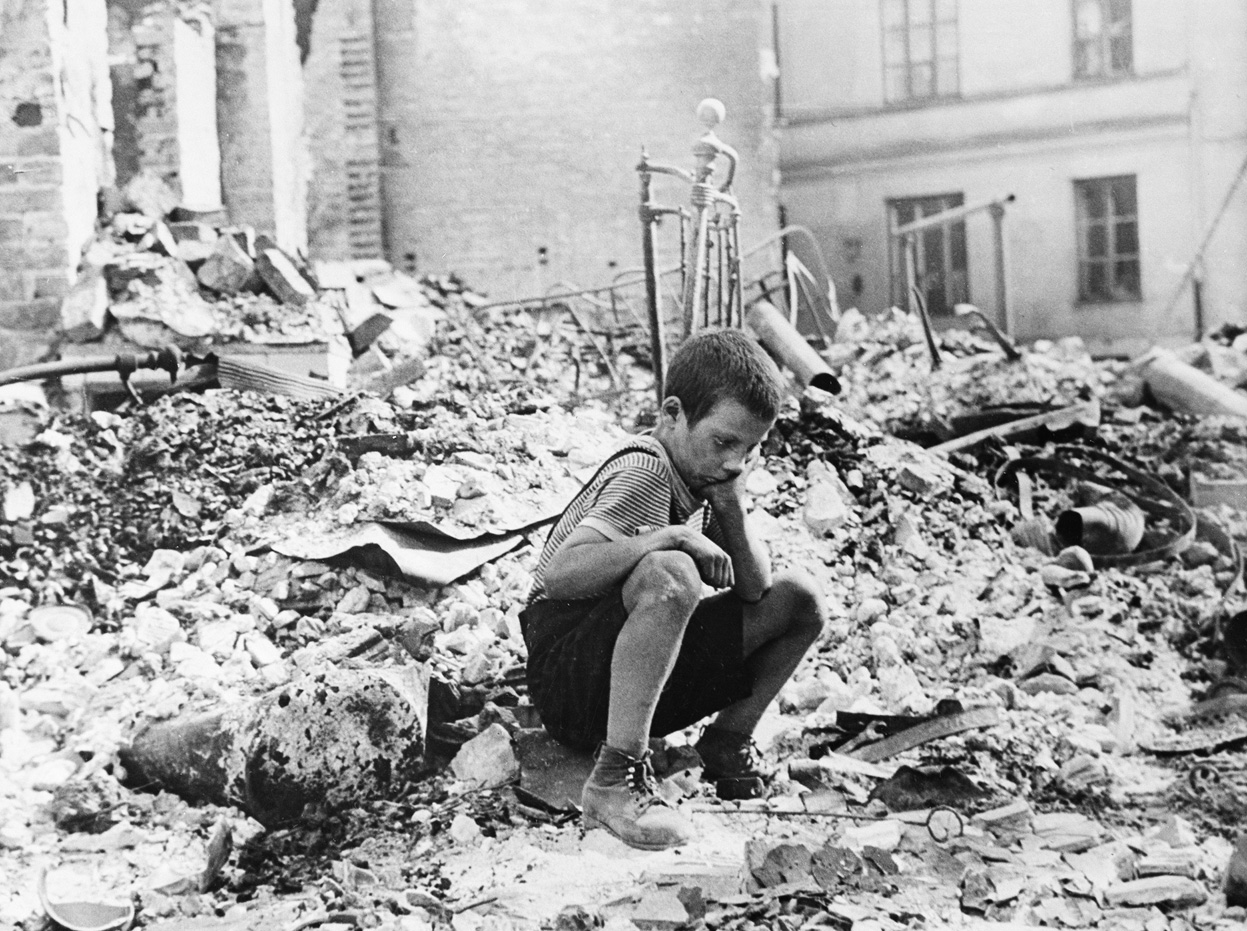
A Polish boy in the ruins of Warsaw, 1939

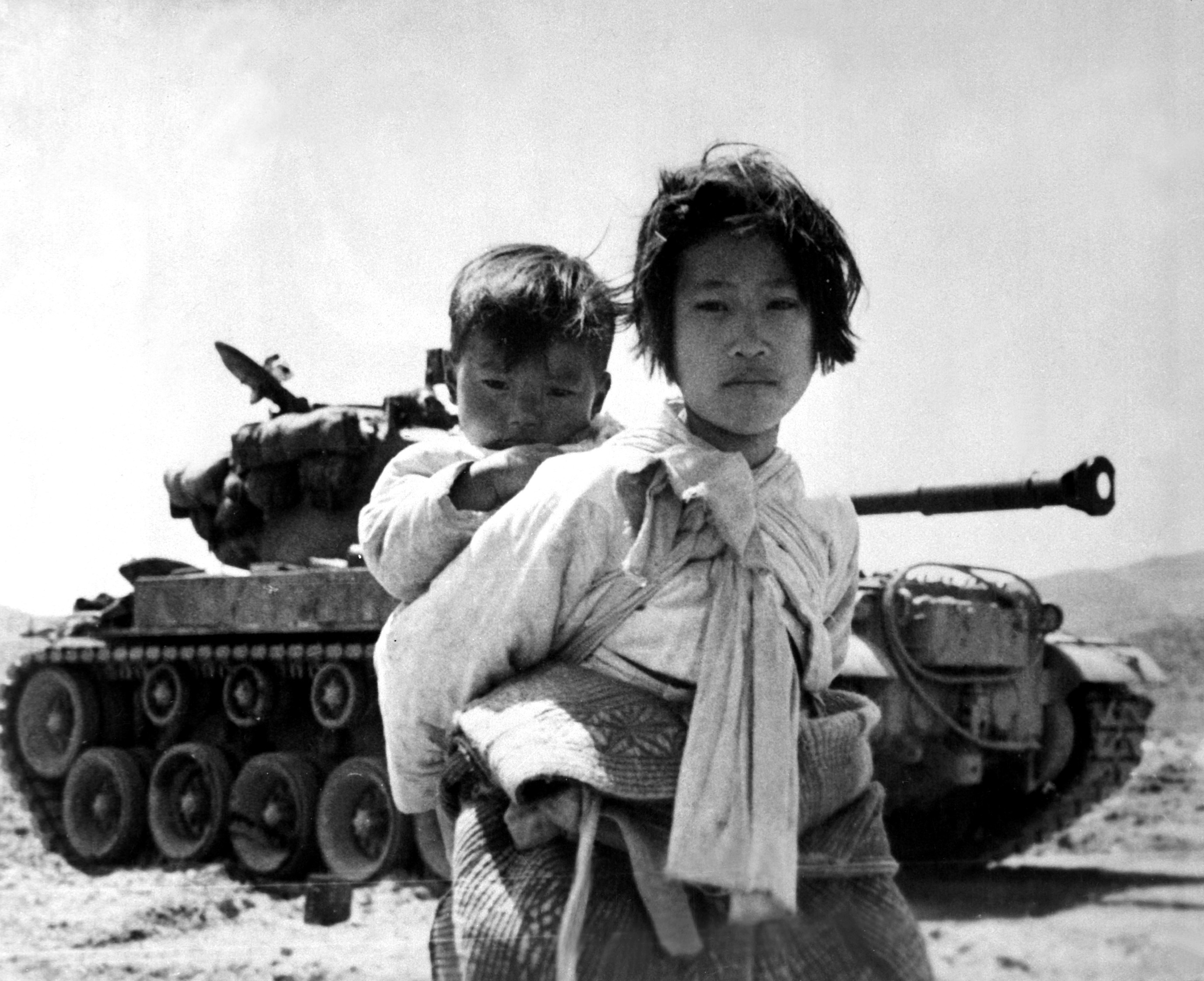
A girl carrying her little brother, Korea, 1951

Conflicts and emergencies around the world pose detrimental risks to the health, safety, and well-being of children. There are many different kinds of conflicts and emergencies, for example, violence, armed conflicts, war, and natural disasters. Some 13 million children are displaced by armed conflicts and violence around the world. Where violent conflicts are the norm, the lives of young children are significantly disrupted and their families have great difficulty in offering the sensitive and consistent care that young children need for their healthy development. One impact is the high rates of PTSD seen in children living with natural disasters or chronic conflict.

== Impact of emergency and conflict experiences ==
In sum, emergency and conflict may impact on children's development in the following manner:

- Physical: exacerbation of medical problems, headaches, fatigue, unexplained physical complaints.
- Cognitive: trouble concentrating, preoccupation with the traumatic event, recurring dreams or nightmares, questioning spiritual beliefs, inability to process the event.
- Emotional: depression or sadness, irritability, anger, resentfulness, despair, hopelessness, feelings of guilt, phobias, health concerns, anxiety, or fearfulness.
- Social: increased conflicts with family and friends, sleep problems, crying, changes in appetite, social withdrawal, talking repeatedly about the traumatic event, refusal to go to school, repetitive play.

=== Impact on pregnancy ===
Research shows that environmental factors and experiences can alter the genetic make-up of a developing child. Exposure to prolonged stress, environmental toxins or nutritional deficits chemically alter genes in the foetus or young child and may shape the individual's development temporarily or permanently. Violence and maternal depression may also impair child development and mental health. When trauma occurs at critical times of development for the foetus or young child, the impact on specialized cells for organs such as the brain, heart, or kidney can result in underdevelopment with lifetime implications for physical and mental health. For instance, a study on Iraq showed the rate of heart defects at birth in Fallujah to be 13 times the rate found in Europe. And for birth defects involving the nervous system the rate was calculated to be 33 times that found in Europe for the same number of births. Prolonged stress during pregnancy or early childhood can be particularly toxic and, in the absence of protective relationships, may also result in permanent genetic changes in developing brain cells. Evidence has shown that toxins and stress from the mother cross the placenta into the umbilical cord, leading to premature and low birth weight babies. Likewise, conflict trauma can affect pregnant women and the subsequent emotional health of their children. In addition, babies of severely stressed and worried mothers are at higher risk to be born small or prematurely.

=== Impact on child development ===
Children's reactions to emergencies fluctuate depending on age, temperament, genetics, pre-existing problems, coping skills and cognitive competencies, and the dose of the emergency. Although most children are said to recover over time, if emergency reactions are left untreated, they can have a significant adverse impact on children's social, emotional, behavioural and physical development.

==== Age 6 and younger ====
In conflict-affected countries the average mortality rate for children under 5 is more than double the rate in other countries. On the average, twelve children out of a hundred die before their fifth birthday, compared with six out of a hundred. Common reactions among this age group are severe separation distress, crying, clinging, immobility and/or aimless motion, whimpering, screaming, sleeping and eating disorders, nightmares, fearfulness, regressive behaviours such as thumb-sucking, Bed-Wetting, loss of bowel/bladder control, inability to dress or eat without assistance, and fear of darkness, crowds and being left alone.

During an investigation of the relationship between exposure to day raids and shelling and behavioural and emotional problems among Palestinian children, aged 3–6, in the Gaza Strip, children demonstrated sleeping problems, poor concentration, attention-seeking behaviour, dependency, temper tantrums and increased fear. Mothers of Palestinian kindergarten children reported severely impaired psychosocial and emotional functioning in their children. Thabet et al. examined the behavioural and emotional problems of 309 Palestinian pre-schoolers, and found that direct and indirect exposure to war trauma increased the risk of poor mental health. Zahr et al., in a study on the effect of war on Lebanese pre-school children, found more problems in children aged 3–6 years exposed to heavy shelling over a 2-year period than in a control group living without this threat. According to Yaktine, 40 mothers of different socio-economic backgrounds during the civil war in Beirut reported that their pre-school children became more anxious and fearful about bombardments and explosions. After SCUD missile attacks, displaced Israeli pre-school children demonstrated aggression, hyperactivity and oppositional behaviour and stress. This was compared with non-displaced children and, despite a continuous decrease in symptom severity, risk factors identified shortly after the Gulf War continued to exert their influence on children five years after the traumatic exposure.

==== Ages 6 to 11 ====
Common symptoms in this age bracket include disturbing thoughts and images, nightmares, eating and sleeping disorders, noncompliance, irritability, extreme withdrawal, outbursts of anger and fighting, disruptive behaviour, inability to pay attention, irrational fears, regressive behaviour, depression and anxiety, feeling of guilt and emotional numbing, excessive clinging, headaches, nausea and visual or hearing problems. Traumatic events experienced before the age of 11 are three times more likely to result in serious emotional and behavioural difficulties than those experienced later in life.

According to the Palestinian Counseling Centre, Save the Children, even six months after the demolition of their homes, young Palestinian children experienced withdrawal, somatic complaints, depression/anxiety, unexplained pain, breathing problems, attention difficulties and violent behaviour. They were afraid to go to school, had problems relating to other children and greater attachment to caregivers. As a result, parents reported deterioration in educational achievement and ability to study.

Al-Amine and Liabre revealed that 27.7 per cent of Lebanese children aged between 6 and 12 developed symptoms of PTSD, as well as from problems sleeping, agitation, difficulties in concentrating and excessive awareness of events related to the 2006 Lebanese-Israeli war. Many children in Sudan and northern Uganda who were forced to witness family members being tortured and murdered exhibited stunting, PTSD and other trauma-related disorders.

=== PTSD ===
Studies on the effect of emergencies and conflict on the physical and mental health of children between birth and 8 years old show that where the disaster is natural, the rate of PTSD occurs in anywhere from 3 to 87 per cent of affected children. However, rates of PTSD for children living in chronic conflict conditions varies from 15 to 50 per cent as evidenced in the following countries: Iran, Iraq, Israel, Kuwait, Lebanon, Palestine, Rwanda, South Africa, and Sudan.

=== Disabilities ===
Children with disabilities are disproportionately affected by emergencies, and many become disabled during disasters. Children with disabilities may suffer due to loss of their assistive devices, loss of access to medicines or rehabilitative services and, in some cases, loss of their caregiver. In addition, disabled children tend to be more vulnerable to abuse and violence. UNICEF research indicates that violence against children with disabilities occurs at annual rates at least 1.7 times greater than their non-disabled peers. Young children with disabilities living in conflict are more vulnerable and the consequent physical, psychological or emotional problems are higher. They are also more likely to develop emotional and mental health problems during emergencies because of lack of mobility, treatment, and medication or through starvation. The Inter-Agency Standing Committee (IASC) recognizes that children with pre-existing disabilities are more vulnerable to mistreatment, discrimination, abuse and destitution. Children with mobility, visual and hearing disabilities or intellectual impairments may feel particularly vulnerable if an emergency leads to the relocation of school and the learning of new daily routines. During emergencies, long unsafe distances to school, the lack of buildings with adequate facilities and equipment and teachers with minimum qualifications, are likely to be overwhelming challenges for young children with disabilities to be enrolled in day care and early education.

=== Gender differences ===
Some research shows that girls exhibit higher levels of distress than boys in relation to stressful situations and are considered at higher risk in situations of war and terror. Other research has found that girls express more worry, anxiety and depressive disorders, and PTSD symptoms while boys show more behavioural problems in the aftermath of a disaster. However, pre-school girls exposed to earthquakes in Sultandagi (Turkey) displayed more problematic behaviours than boys in the same educational category. Additionally, Wiest, Mocellin, and Motsisi contend that young children, especially girls, may be vulnerable to sexual abuse and exploitation. Garbarino and Kostelny reported that Palestinian boys developed more psychological problems than girls when exposed to chronic conflict. In another study, Palestinian boys were more susceptible to effects of violence during early childhood and girls during adolescence. In general it appears that boys take longer to recover, displaying more aggressive, antisocial and violent behaviour while girls may be more distressed but are more verbally expressive about their emotions.

=== Educational consequences ===
In all conflict-affected countries, 21.5 million children of primary school age are out of school. Over the past decade, the problem of out-of- school children has been increasingly concentrated in conflict-affected countries, where the proportion increased from 29% in 2000 to 35% in 2014; in Northern Africa and Western Asia, it increased from 63% to 91%.

Quality education alleviates the psychosocial impact of conflict and disasters by giving a sense of normalcy, stability, structure and hope for the future. However, emergency and conflict situations often undermine the quality of educational services. They result in shortages of materials, resources and personnel, thereby depriving young children of the opportunity to receive quality early education. In most conflicts, education infrastructure is usually a target. Pre-schools and schools are often destroyed or closed due to hazardous conditions depriving young children of the opportunity to learn and socialize in a safe place that provides a sense of routine.

Young children living under emergencies are less likely to be in primary school and more likely to drop out. Primary school completion in poorer conflict-affected countries is 65 per cent while it is 86 per cent in other poor countries. According to the 2000 UNICEF MICS report, information from Iraq, for example, confirms the lack of Early Childhood Development programmes within the formal educational system. Only 3.7 per cent of children aged from 36 to 59 months were enrolled in nurseries or kindergartens. Low enrollment rates in early education programmes decrease the opportunity for young children to find a safe space where they flourish and release the stress and tension resulting from the emergency. In countries with ongoing emergencies, researchers have found a full range of symptoms that may be co-morbid with trauma, including attention deficit hyperactivity disorder, poor academic performance, behavioural problems, bullying and abuse, oppositional defiant disorder, conduct disorder, phobic disorder and negative relationships (Terr, 1991; Streeck-Fischer and van der Kolk, 2000).

A study using the Young Lives data in Ethiopia found that young children whose mothers had died were 20 per cent less likely to enroll in school, 21 per cent less likely to be able to write, and 27 per cent less likely to be able to read. Dybdahl found that 5- to 6-year-old war-traumatized Bosnian children showed lower levels of cognitive competence. Pre-school and school age Palestinian children exposed to severe losses, wounding and home destruction had impaired cognitive capacity for attention and concentration. Severe trauma has been found to be associated with inexcitable and narrowed attention and problem-solving strategies. Since both physical and mental health are linked to language and cognitive development, it is reasonable to assume that violent conflict has a negative effect on these areas of development.

== Support ==
Early childhood care and education (ECCE) is a multisectoral field that holistically addresses children's multiple needs. During emergencies ECCE supportive services may address a range of issues including prenatal care, immunization, nutrition, education, psychosocial support and community engagement. Coordinated services of health and nutrition, water sanitation and hygiene, early learning, mental health and protection are considered essential in supporting young children living under emergencies and conflicts.

Many programmes and strategies, whether in the formal or non-formal education sector, have proved to be very supportive to the well-being and recovery of young children living in areas of conflict. Child Friendly Spaces (CFS) programmes have been found valuable in creating a sense of normality and providing coping skills and resilience to children affected by emergencies. Child Friendly Spaces help children develop social skills and competencies such as sharing and cooperation through interaction with other children. They also offer opportunities to learn about risks in their environment and build life skills, such as literacy and non-violent conflict resolution, and provide a useful means of mobilizing communities around children's needs. In an effort to strengthen community systems of child protection, Christian Children's Fund (CCF) established three centres for internally displaced young children in Unyama (Uganda) camp that provided a safe, adult-supervised place for young children between 3 and 6 years of age. War Child established six 'safe spaces' in schools in northern Lebanon for displaced Syrian children where counsellors used art and music therapy to help young children express their emotions in a healthy way.

Several studies show that children who have participated in quality education programmes within schools tend to have better knowledge of hazards, reduced levels of fear and more realistic risk perceptions than their peers. In such contexts, psychosocial intervention programmes for young children and their families are considered to be vital. Interventions such as storytelling, singing, jumping rope, role-play activities, team sports and writing and drawing exercises helped to reduce psychological distress associated with exposure to conflict-related violence in Sierra Leone for children aged 8 to 18. Studies in Eritrea and Sierra Leone revealed that children's psychosocial well-being was improved by well-designed educational interventions. In Afghanistan, young children and adolescents gained a sense of stability and security after their involvement in constructive activities (e.g. art, narrative, sports) which took place in neutral safe places within their communities.

== See also ==
- Children in the Israeli–Palestinian conflict
- Declaration on the Protection of Women and Children in Emergency and Armed Conflict
- Disaster response
- Education in emergencies and conflict areas
- Humanitarian crisis
- Inter-Agency Network for Education in Emergencies
- International child abduction
- List of ongoing armed conflicts
- Military use of children
- Refugee children
- Save the Children
- Trafficking of children
- UNICEF
