= Oyamada =

Oyamada (written: 小山田 lit. "hill field") is a Japanese surname. Notable people with the surname include:

- Hiroko Oyamada (小山田 浩子, born 1983), Japanese writer
- Oyamada Nobushige (小山田 信茂, 1545–1582), Japanese samurai
- Sayuri Oyamada (小山田 サユリ, born 1975), Japanese actress
- Oyamada Clan, Japanese clan

== See also ==
- Oyamada Station (小山田駅, Oyamada-eki), train station in Hanamaki, Iwate Prefecture, Japan
- Ōyamada, Mie (大山田村, Ōyamada-mura) former village in Ayama District, Mie Prefecture, Japan
- Koyamada (小山田), Japanese surname using the same kanji
