= Grace Obalim =

Ugandan clinical psychologist

Dr Grace Obalim
- Citizenship: Uganda
- Education: Nairobi University (MSc Clinical Psychology)
- Occupations: Clinical psychologist and Mental Health and Psychosocial Support Advisor
- Employer: Transcultural Psychosocial Organisation
- Organization: Transcultural Psychosocial Organisation (TPO)
- Known for: Public Health

Grace Obalim is a Ugandan clinical psychologist and mental health advocate. She serves as the mental health and psycho-social support (MHPSS) advisor at Transcultural Psychosocial Organisation (TPO) Uganda specialize in the community of Northern Uganda and is the coordinator of the national MHPSS working group.

== Early life and education ==
Obalim holds a Master of Science in Clinical Psychology at the University of Nairobi, Kenya alongside other soft and lifelong skills which include customer service, volunteer management, event management, public speaking and youth mentoring among many others

== Career ==
On 10 September 2026, Obalim said that to change Uganda narration around suicide, the suicidal stress culprits should be listened to and understood; suicidal behavior is preceded by long term emotional and psychological distress but not immediate life situation.

As the national coordinator for mental health and psychosocial support in charge of Uganda, she gifted both the national and local mental health partner during the inaugural mental health awareness football league with a box of 1000 campaign at the end of every year while also empathizing that football gala can officially open gift box so that the awardee can declare how much fund they will have collected.

Obalim urges the government of Uganda to consider reamendment of Penal Code to punish suicide as a crime to attempted suicidal person so as to prevent its rampant occurrence. She said that suicide issues are said to be a mental health problem that a man cannot hold for long.

During the Uganda Integrates Mental Health into National Emergency Preparedness' workshop on 18 September 2025, pointed out that mentor health awareness is more than having assistant commissioner but creating division that can strengthen in providing technical supervision, guidance and response. Going forward she did recall how far and hard-fought Mental Health and Psychosocial Support Advisor from Transcultural Psychosocial Organisation has gone in humaritian partnership.
