= Spirit Love Show =

- Genre: Reality television
- Created by: Claudia Hallowell; Nia Lyte; Shin Koyamada
- Starring: Nia Lyte; Claudia Hallowell
- Country of origin: United States
- Original language: English
- No. of seasons: 2
- No. of episodes: 9

Production
- Executive producers: Shin Koyamada; Claudia Hallowell; Nia Lyte
- Producer: Sara Molina
- Cinematography: Jay Lee; Guillermo Quezada
- Editor: Jay Lee
- Production companies: Shinca Pictures; Claudia Hallowell Entertainment

Original release
- Release: 2013 – 2013

Spirit Love Show is an American reality television miniseries created by Shin Koyamada, Nia Lyte and Claudia Hallowell in 2013. The show was distributed by the Spirit Show Network and directed by Jay Lee from Sony Pictures' Zombie Strippers. The hosts of the show are Nia Lyte, a TED Talk speaker and host from a television show Best of Art Basel, distributed on Comcast, Ovation TV and Xfinity TV, and Claudia Hallowell who also wrote.

== Summary ==
Spirit Love Show explores what love is to people of all ages: children, teenagers, adults and people who have been married for over half a century. The show features David Marciano, The Jeffrey Foundation, Reins of H.O.P.E. and others. Through interviews, the show will find what love means to individuals and couples in all walks of life as well as people of different cultures. In addition, the show will showcase what individuals, couples, groups and companies are doing to express love in the world to bring hope and inspiration.

== Cast ==
Hosts

- Nia Lyte - Host
- Claudia Hallowell - Host

Featuring

- David Marciano - an award winner actor from television series Due South and the FX police drama The Shield
- International tourists at Grauman's Chinese Theatre in Hollywood
- Julie Sardonia - a founder of Reins of H.O.P.E.
- Alice Morris - a founder of The Jeffrey Foundation
- John & Claire Yzaguirre - Marriage & Family Counselors
- Therapy Dogs, Inc
- Speed Dating
- Oxnard Multicultural Festival
- GBK Emmy's Gifting Suite

== Episodes ==
No.	Title	Directed by	Written by	Original release date
Season One
1	"Episode One"	Jay Lee	Claudia Hallowell	2013
This episode features interviews in the famous Grauman's Chinese Theatre in Hollywood. International tourists give their opinion about Love.
2	"Episode Two"	Jay Lee	Claudia Hallowell	2013
This episode features interviews to single and married couples about their experiences, thoughts and feelings of Love.
3	"Episode Three"	Jay Lee	Claudia Hallowell	2013
This episode features Julie Sardonia, a Founder of Reins of H.O.P.E., shares with the viewers "The Hope for Warriors" Program, Equine Assisted Psychotherapy with horses and military service exploring the love horses and animals express to human beings in their healing journey.
4	"Episode Four"	Jay Lee	Claudia Hallowell	2013
This episode features The Jeffrey Foundation, a non-profit organization that strives to improve the quality of life for special needs children and their families through the development of community-based therapeutic, recreational, educational, and social programs. Featuring an exclusive interview with Founder Alice Morris and the importance of giving love to special needs children.
Season Two
1	"Episode One"	Jay Lee	Claudia Hallowell	2013
This episode features a 101 interview with Marriage & Family Counselors John & Claire Yzaguirre sharing tips on how to have a healthy relationship understanding the differences and commonalities between men and women.
2	"Episode Two"	Jay Lee	Claudia Hallowell	2013
This episode features the love for animals/Dogs with organization Therapy Dogs, Inc. The Founders share with the viewers miracle healing and the unconditional love dogs give to ill patients and their owners.
3	"Episode Three"	Jay Lee	Claudia Hallowell	2013
This episode features a new way of dating in United States called: Speed Dating.
4	"Episode Four"	Jay Lee	Claudia Hallowell	2013
This episode features the Oxnard Multicultural Festival in California, interviews with people from around the world and different cultures sharing their perspectives on what love is for them. Featuring children giving a message of love to the world.
5	"Episode Five"	Jay Lee	Claudia Hallowell	2013
This episode features the GBK Emmy's Gifting Suite, an exclusive interviews to an award winner actor David Marciano, One World non-profit helping children in Thailand and NKL organization helping giving love to dogs.
