= Newcomer education =

Specialized teaching of newcomers who have resettled in a host country

Newcomer education is the specialized teaching of refugees, migrants, asylees and immigrants who have resettled in a host country, with the goal of providing the knowledge and skills necessary to integrate into their country of refuge. Education is the primary way by which newcomers can adjust to the linguistic, social, and cultural environments of their new communities. Newcomer education aims to empower newcomers with a sense of self-efficacy and social integration, as well as giving them the skills to pursue employment or higher education. Newcomer education also aims to help address trauma, culture shock, and other negative effects of forced displacement. Education for newcomers can provide long-term prospects for stability of individuals, communities, countries and global society.

== Background ==
Newcomer education is a need with international implications. The Refugee Convention of the UNHCR in 1951 listed public education as one of the fundamental rights of refugees, stating that “elementary education satisfies an urgent need [and] schools are the most rapid and effective instrument of assimilation.” As of 2019, 149 states were party to this agreement.

There is significant difficulty in obtaining a total estimate of global newcomers. In 2019, the UNHCR estimated a global total of 26.0 million refugees and 4.2 million asylum-seekers. Of that total, 16.2 million applied for asylum in countries of refuge, and 1.1 million were formally resettled. According to the UN, 2019 saw a total of 22.8 million declared new immigrants worldwide. However, irregular or illegal migration may contribute upwards of 20 million to official totals.

While there is an increasing number of refugees forcibly displaced to host countries with hopes of beginning a successful new life, the lack of resources and countless obstacles prevent many from success in their education. Forcibly displaced persons are especially underrepresented in higher levels of education. In 2017, 61% of Refugee children were enrolled in primary school, compared to 92% globally. 23% of refugee adolescents were enrolled in secondary education, compared to 84% globally. In 2016, 1% of refugee youth were enrolled at the tertiary level, compared to 34% globally.

== Challenges and best practices ==
Overview of key education-related challenges in refugee contexts

Newcomer students have a unique set of challenges in the classroom. Newcomers face cultural, linguistic, and social barriers to accessing classroom content, as well as the academic challenges of content comprehension and demonstration of mastery. Host nations are challenged to fulfill international commitments to respect the right to education for all. In order to provide effective education for newcomers, schools must meet a set of broad comprehensive needs as well as a set of specialized academic needs specific to newcomer students. Newcomer students may experience trauma from rape, war, psychological abuse, physical abuse, neglect, and involuntary displacement affects their learning abilities and development. Trauma imposes challenges in education for these students. Recognizing trauma among newcomer students is necessary to understand trauma-informed care and implement trauma-informed teaching practices to assist these students. This trauma-informed care is shifting the focus from what is wrong with a person to what has happened to a person in order to understand their current mental state and how it affects them in the present moment.

Additionally, legacies of institutionalized racism and xenophobia can be exacerbated in cases of refugee resettlement as explained by the theory of segmented assimilation; this theory posits that the assimilation of refugees is constrained by the existing racism of the host country. This results in ineffective refugee education, and disadvantages refugee children in both their social and educational environments. Better or full assimilation and integration of refugee children has been demonstrated to positively impact their education and development.

The education and quality of resources these refugee students are dealt with can completely alter the direction of their lives. Certain programs that are more supportive of refugee students and provide them the quality education they need in a way that is specifically tailored toward them reap positive results. One example of this can be identified in a case study where a young refugee student named Moussa attended a school with a tailored refugee-specific curriculum. Within Moussa's school which consisted of majority of refugee and minority students, it was found that “Black [refugee] students at Moussa's school were much more likely to graduate in four years than other black students citywide [New York], and the school fostered aspirations for college and professional success.” Specifically, when looking at the percentage differentiation between generic public schools in New York City and Moussa's specialized school, Black refugee students were 85% more likely to graduate as compared to the significantly low 60% that is present in other schools. Schools such as Moussa's that are specially tailored for students of refugee background have demonstrated significant benefits and appeal as compared to “normal” public schools. Within a program like this, they can be provided with a quality education that better prepares them for America. This is one of the countless similar schools within the United States that are specially designed to support refugee students.

These programs are critical to the growth and lives of refugees in the United States. While public schools across the United States have systems in place that provide support and resources for these types of students, they tend to fall under a "one size fits all" approach. However, as seen in other countries, “Recognizing the different levels of adversity students face, we have called this a triple disadvantage, which we understand may still be underestimating the range of experiences and challenges faced by immigrant families and their children”. Rather than boxing and categorizing refugee and newcomer children into generic groups with generalized methods of supporting them, specialized programs are needed to address the specific experiences of these students. Within schools like Moussa's, educators can spend more time recognizing the individual struggles of students and pursue specialized methods of education and support for them as compared to more normal public schools. These programs have been proven to have long-term positive effects on the lives of these students.

Research shows that addressing the specific needs of refugee and immigrant students, supporting their second language learning through more personalized instruction, adapting the curriculum in classrooms to be culturally relevant, and creating an environment of inter-student collaboration is key to cultivating their academic success.

=== Comprehensive needs ===
Academic research suggests that newcomer students have a set of “comprehensive needs” that must be met as a precondition for language acquisition and academic success. These needs include secure housing, financial support, legal aid, mental health and trauma support, and social and acculturation support. The main issues faced by refugee students are related to multicultural adaptation, second language learning, assessment trends, and interventions. The need for school-provided mental health services for refugees, who have often escaped highly traumatic backgrounds, is also critical. Academic and career opportunities are beneficial for refugee students when paired with need-specific support programs for refugee and immigrant students.

Best practices for meeting comprehensive needs involve two phases: an introductory period and an ongoing support system. The introductory period includes a robust intake and cultural orientation process. An ongoing support system involves the provision of wraparound services and connections with community based organizations outside of the school context.

Intake involves an assessment of students’ language abilities, educational history, home and family situation, and physical and mental health needs. Schools can improve such an intake process by employing dedicated psychiatric social workers to help with assessments, as well as providing referrals to community resources and following up with families after the intake process is complete. Social workers have also been shown to play vital roles in facilitating social inclusion in educational settings. Through their unique connections to students’ personal, academic, and familial life, these workers can advocate for them through supportive counseling, policy advocacy functions in their schools and communities, and case management.

Cultural orientation to school life includes formal explanations of expectations and requirements as well as ongoing informal conversations with peers or administrators. Orientation is especially critical for students with limited or interrupted formal education, as they may not understand the cultural and behavioral expectations of a school environment. During this process, it is important to introduce culturally specific ways of thinking about education. In the western world, these include understanding the emphasis placed on individual academic achievement and “viewing learning as a foundation for future learning[...] rather than solely as a tool for practical use."

Ongoing support involves the provision of wraparound services, such as onsite physical and mental health clinics, restorative justice systems, college counseling, nonprofit legal services, extracurricular student engagement, and trauma response teams. Often, schools partner with community-based organizations to ensure effective provisioning for these needs.

The trauma of violent experiences and the resettlement process, poverty, and resentment faced by classmates and students all lead to educational disadvantages that cannot be completely addressed by only providing academic resources. School administrations must utilize a comprehensive community-based approach when addressing the needs of refugee and immigrant students.

=== Academic needs ===
Specialized academic programming for newcomers is beneficial to effective language acquisition and academic success. Sheltered instruction, content integration, and flexible scheduling have proven successful in improving graduation rates for newcomer students.

Sheltered instruction involves placing newcomer students in specially designed content classes, typically with smaller class sizes and more instructional support. This approach is recommended for newcomer students with limited literacy skills, especially those with partial or interrupted formal education. Sheltered instruction can also be used as a strategy to integrate newcomer students into formal education for the first year or years of their education, before joining broader ESL programs or general instruction classes.

Content integration combines language instruction with grade-level content instruction in math, science, and humanities. Learning content and language together has proven significantly more effective than learning language in isolation, and has the additional benefit of keeping students intellectually engaged and on track for high school graduation.

Flexible class scheduling and additional learning time during evenings, summers, and weekends allow newcomers with work or family responsibilities to stay in school, as well as providing additional instructional time for students with interrupted formal education.

=== Funding ===
As of 2019, approximately 85% of refugees and 50% of immigrants globally were living in developing countries. The Least Developed Countries hosted 27% of refugees and 14% of immigrants worldwide. These countries often have poor educational infrastructure, which provides an additional challenge to refugee education.

Even in developed countries, newcomer education is often underfunded.

=== Teacher training ===
Teachers of newcomers require specialized training to manage multilingual classrooms and help students in need of psychosocial support.

Research indicates that addressing the specific needs of immigrant students, supporting their English language learning through providing them with more personalized instruction, adapting the curriculum in classrooms to be culturally relevant, and creating an environment of inter-student collaboration is key to cultivating for their academic success. In countries like the United States, there is a lack of cultural awareness in most academic settings due to the majority white homogeneity of teachers. Due to the adversity of their situation, refugee and immigrant children require instructors that not only have cultural awareness but are also educated on how to teach trauma survivors. This can only be achieved through increased teacher training programs and increased support for teachers managing diversity in their classrooms.

In six European countries, half of teachers felt there was insufficient support to manage diversity in the classroom. In the Syrian Arab Republic, 73% of teachers surveyed had no training on providing children with psychosocial support. Teacher recruitment and management policies often react too slowly to emerging needs. Germany needs an additional 42,000 teachers and educators, Turkey needs 80,000 teachers and Uganda needs 7,000 primary teachers to teach all current refugees.

=== United States newcomer programs ===
A newcomer program is an educational institution created specifically for those students with limited proficiency in English that have recently arrived from outside the United States within the past one to three years. Newcomer programs offer a safe space for immigrants and refugees new to the United States where the focus can lie on nurturing students as they adjust to a new school and are immersed in English in a non-threatening way. Newcomer programs support this special population of students to grow in English language development while implementing appropriate academic skills necessary for success in United States educational systems. Qualifications to attend such programs also include an initial English placement exam. Educational backgrounds of students differ depending on how much education in their native language they have received. There are literate newcomers who arrive with grade level equivalent skills in literacy and academics due to schooling in their native language. There are also newcomers who arrive with minimal exposure to formal schooling (Limited Formal Schooling or LMS students). Schooling may be interrupted placing the student below grade level. Existing newcomer centers can serve students at the elementary, middle, and high school levels.

The organization of newcomer programs vary. One example of a newcomer program are the International Networks Schools that works to provide immigrants a school where they use student's cultural and linguistic backgrounds as a backbone to create academically and language appropriate instruction. The International Schools' curriculum includes English Language Learning, assessment, professional learning, governance, and organization. To accommodate this, International schools try to integrate language development by engaging students in “deeper learning”. Deeper learning includes project-based learning, work-based learning, and performance assessments which allows students to learn in a personalized way. This includes a lot of collaboration within the classroom setting to help enhance students' communication and English language skills. In addition to classroom approaches, International Schools also include “structures to address their social and emotional needs, including regular access to social workers, counselors, and wraparound services”. The teaching approach used at these schools focuses on that of the "plurilingual" way of instruction. A newcomer center also is complemented by culturally responsive teaching which encompasses all cultural characteristics to make academic instruction authentic for Culturally and Linguistically Diverse (CLD) students. Another example of a U.S. newcomer program is one set up within a school based upon the community location where newcomer populations are most prevalent. Newcomer programs are also found 1) within a district intake center, 2) located in an area equidistant from surrounding schools, or 3) in a district that offers multiple newcomer centers. Conversely, some school districts across the United States do not offer a newcomer program due to lack of resources.

=== Germany newcomer programs ===
The German government has designed and funded a well-regarded newcomer education program. Refugees in Germany can avail of Germany's free public education system for primary and secondary schooling. The program is especially well known for its emphasis on higher education. The most recent wave of refugees have been from Syria, and have been under the age of 25, of which 50,000 embraced the opportunity for higher education in Germany. The German government created an initiative where approximately 2,400 refugees would be integrated into universities every year and allocated 110 million to spend between 2015 and 2019. The German Academic Exchange Service, which is funded by federal ministries, integrated refugees into degree programs that included preparatory colleges and foundation courses. A unique policy funded by the German Federal Ministry of Education is their “Welcome Students Helping Refugee” program which is a mentorship program that connects refugees to local university students to help them in language exchanges and expose them to cultural events. Furthermore, programs by Fraunhofer-Gesellschaft, the Leibniz Association, and the Max Planck Society offered “internships lasting up to three months, research assistant positions, and training opportunities” for professional development. Not only does Germany solely focus on incorporating refugees into higher educational spaces, but they are also making the effort to help them receive professional opportunities.

==== Literacy instruction focus ====
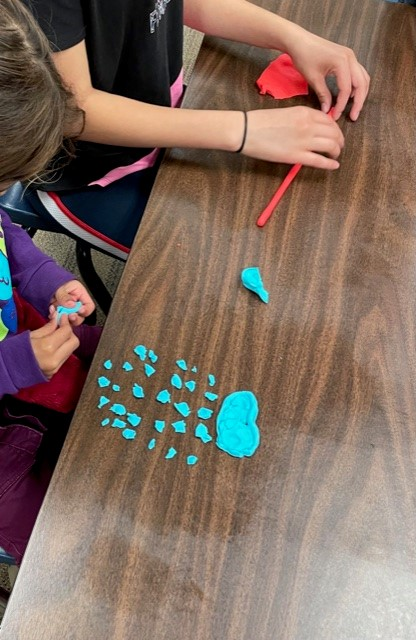
EL elementary newcomer students express their feelings after hearing a read aloud about colors and feelings. This is an example of Tompkin (2003) components three and four.

A foundational goal is for newcomer students to be immersed in a sound literacy program that fosters success in both oral language and English language development in the area of literacy. Unlike a native English speaker who begins literacy instruction in early elementary grades, it is common for newcomer students to first have their first exposure to the English language upon entrance in a newcomer program. To validate this point, Alfred Schifini (2002), zeroed in on literacy for this specific population and states English Language Learners (ELLs) need to have a focus that is, "systematic, explicit, and targeted at diagnosed needs" as he presented at the National Conference on Newcomer Programs. The speech highlighted how a newcomer literacy program provides specialized instruction based on the needs of the students within the program in order to provide meaningful and appropriate instruction.

For implementation of a literacy-focused program to occur, Custodio suggests there be a selected set of elements to consider, fourteen to be exact. The fourteen components that Custodio (2011) highlights in her text, can complement a newcomer program and have been created by Gail Tompkin (2003). These components are summarized as:

1) Instruction of Basic Reading Skills

2) Instruction of High Frequency Words

3) Implementation of Vocabulary Comprehension

4) Incorporation of Reading and Writing Activities that Improve the Fluency and Comprehension

5) Interweaving of Listening, Speaking, Reading, and Writing Simultaneously

6) Instruction of Learning Strategies and Building Background to Aid in Comprehension

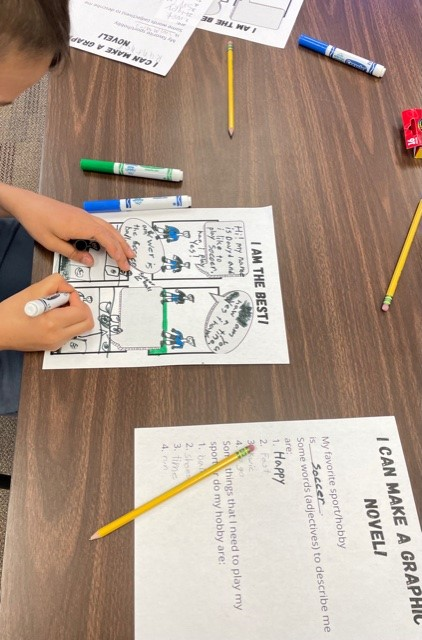
EL elementary newcomer student using graphic organizer to create a graphic novel. This is an example of Tompkin (2003) component seven.

7) Incorporating the Visual Strategy of Graphic Organizers

8) Utilization of Varied Genres

9) Incorporation of Routined Reading and Writing Activities

10) Incorporation of Student Choice Classroom Activities

11) Implementation of Writing Scaffolds

12) Student Familiarization of Textbook Features and Study Techniques

13) Orientating Newcomers on Content Level Resources at Student's Grade Level

14) Support in Student's Continued Academic and Language Growth

The above components provide helpful guidelines for ELL newcomer teachers and staff running a program and implementation of these aid newcomer students to thrive and grow in their English language development. Custodio (2011) continues to stress the importance of a strong newcomer literacy program. Implications for such a program, can push newcomers from, "pre-literacy to a point of fluency and comprehension of grade-level fiction and nonfiction text" (p. 59).

Alongside these components other criteria can be considered: the student's native language background and cultures, limited oral speaking abilities, and the selection of differentiated curriculum.

Trauma-informed teaching practice

Newcomer children and youth often experience trauma, whether it be psychological or physical. The various experiences faced by newcomers considerably affect their abilities to learn in school and interact with others. Due to the natural state of displacement that newcomers experience while fleeing their home countries, their learning is disrupted, and their migration to a new country comes with many challenges. Newcomer students are expected to acclimate, learn new languages, and perform well while experiencing trauma. Educators spend a significant amount of time with their students, and ensuring that they are equipped to assist their students is critical and beneficial for the students. Understanding and supporting their student's needs by implementing trauma-informed practices can alleviate some of the pressures newcomer children experience and create a safe place for them to heal. The ARC Framework employs strategies to address the issues of trauma. The acronym stands for attachment, regulation, and competency, three critical components to recovery from trauma. The framework is a guiding tool for educators to support their students who have traumatic pasts. The ARC framework is applied to a high school in Canada where multiple children in a classroom are newcomers. Upon implementing the ARC framework and trauma-informed practices, the teachers reported feeling better equipped to assist their students.

== See also ==
- Education in emergencies and conflict areas
- Mobile learning for refugees
- Refugee children
- Street children
- Runaway (dependent)

== Sources ==
This article incorporates text from a free content work. Licensed under CC BY-SA 3.0 IGO. Text taken from Migration, displacement and education: building bridges, not walls; Global education monitoring report, youth report, 2019, UNESCO, UNESCO. UNESCO.

This article incorporates text from a free content work. Licensed under CC BY-SA 3.0 IGO. Text taken from A Lifeline to learning: leveraging mobile technology to support education for refugees, UNESCO, UNESCO. UNESCO.

This article incorporates text from a free content work. Licensed under CC BY-SA 3.0 IGO. Text taken from Right to education handbook, UNESCO, UNESCO. UNESCO.
