= The 25th National Cultural Festival Okayama 2010 =

The 25th National Cultural Festival Okayama 2010 (第２５回国民文化祭・おかやま２０１０) is The National Cultural Festival held in Okayama Prefecture, Japan between October 30 and November 7, 2010. The festival hosted 68 events such as the opening festival, orchestral music, choral music, brass band music, drama, literary, arts, dance, traditional Japanese music are held throughout the festival in all of Okayama Prefecture's cities, towns and villages.

The Opening Ceremony was performed by the lead cast Shin Koyamada as Makibi on the stage in Momotaro Arena in Okayama. Special guests included the Japanese Crown Prince and the Governor of Okayama Prefecture.

The press conference and official announcement were attended by Masahiro Ishii, Shin Koyamada, Noritake Kanzaki and Chika Kano in Okayama on 17 February 2010.

== Hosted by ==
- Agency for Cultural Affairs
- Okayama Prefecture
- Okayama Prefectural Board of Education
- host municipalities
- host municipalities’ boards of education
- The Okayama Executive Committee for the 25th National Cultural Festival
- The Municipal Executive Committee for the 25th National Cultural Festival

== Cast ==
- Shin Koyamada (as Makibi in Opening Ceremony)
- Chika Kano

== Mascot character ==
- Momocchi

== See also ==
- National Cultural Festival
- Ministry of Education, Culture, Sports, Science and Technology (Japan)
- Agency for Cultural Affairs
