= Heart of the Dragon (American TV series) =

- Official Poster
- Genre: Action/martial arts
- Developed by: Shin Koyamada; Jeff McDonald; James E. West II
- Written by: James E. West II
- Country of origin: United States
- Original language: English
- No. of seasons: 1
- No. of episodes: 1

Production
- Executive producers: Shin Koyamada; Jeff McDonald; James E. West II
- Production location: Los Angeles
- Running time: 5 minutes
- Production companies: Shinca Entertainment; Shades of Utopia Productions

Original release
- Network: YouTube
- Release: July 27, 2014

Heart of the Dragon is an American original web series starring Japanese actor Shin Koyamada, described as a "supernatural martial arts thriller". Directed by Jeff McDonald and written by James E. West II from The Proud Family and Moesha, it debuted on YouTube on July 27, 2014.

== Plot ==
John Watanabe (Shin Koyamada) is hired by a very wealthy and mysterious beauty, Marta Williams, to serve as her personal bodyguard. John soon discovers that Marta has a secret. She is pregnant with a supernatural child giving her extraordinary abilities and that he and his client are connected to ancient prophecies. Now he must come to terms with the possibility of his own mortality and his role as protector to the savior of the world.

== Cast ==
- Shin Koyamada – John Watanabe
- Jeannie Bolet – Marta Williams
- Kevin Brewerton – Man in Black
- Stevie J. Hennessey – Frank
- Nakoa Lee – Rob
- Judy Nazemetz – Sherry

== See also ==
- List of Web television series
- Web television
- Krav Maga
