= Inter-Agency Network for Education in Emergencies =

Inter-agency Network for Education in Emergencies
- Formation: 2000
- Type: Network
- Purpose: Education in crisis contexts
- Members: 22,000+ individual members affiliated with more than 4,000 organizations and institutions in 190 countries
- Director: Faiza Hassan
- Website: inee.org

The Inter-agency Network for Education in Emergencies (INEE) INEE is an open, global network of more than 22,000 individual members affiliated with more than 4,000 organizations and institutions in 190 countries. INEE members are from NGOs, UN agencies, donor agencies, governments, academic institutions, schools, and affected populations. INEE exists for and because of its members.

== INEE Minimum Standards ==
The INEE Minimum Standards for Education: Preparedness, Response, Recovery include 19 standards, along with practical key actions and guidance notes. The purpose of the INEE Minimum Standards is to improve the quality of educational preparedness, response, and recovery; to increase access to safe and relevant learning opportunities; and to ensure that the actors who provide these services are held accountable. The INEE Minimum Standards are designed to be applicable to crisis response in many different situations, including emergencies caused by conflict, by natural hazards such as those induced by climate change, and slow- and rapid-onset crises in both rural and urban environments. The INEE MS are founded on the Convention on the Rights of the Child, the Dakar 2000 Education for All goals, and the Sphere Project’s Humanitarian Charter. The current edition of the handbook was published in 2024, following an extensive review and update of the 2004 and 2010 editions by thousands of individuals from more than 35 countries.

== Network Spaces ==
INEE maintains a core staff team, the INEE Secretariat, that represents the network, leads and supports network activities, and coordinates network processes, systems and projects. INEE Secretariat staff are hosted by INEE Steering Group member agencies, which not only helps to ensure promotion and institutionalization of education in emergencies within those agencies but is also cost-efficient.

The INEE Steering Group sets goals and plans for the network, approves new working groups and task teams, and provides strategic guidance to the Secretariat staff. The INEE Steering Group is composed of ten organizational members, represented by senior professionals in the field of education in emergencies.

INEE Working Groups are formal groups of institutional members who work together to implement specific activities toward the achievement of the INEE Strategic Plan. Working Groups are composed of experts and practitioners from a variety of international organisations and institutions, and membership is gained through an application process.

INEE Language Communities are forums that foster collaborative resource development and knowledge-sharing among Arabic, French, Portuguese, and Spanish-speaking members of INEE. The INEE Language Communities collate and disseminate key resources in the relevant languages, and where gaps are identified, work to develop or translate new tools and case studies. The Language Communities also undertake advocacy and outreach in Arabic-speaking, Lusophone, Francophone and Hispanophone countries, raising awareness about the importance of education for those affected by crisis. Furthermore, the Language Communities support and facilitate training and capacity-building opportunities for non-Anglophone INEE Members.

== Journal ==
INEE works with New York University to publish the Journal on Education in Emergencies.

== See also ==
- Children in emergencies and conflicts
