= Mental health psycho-social support =

Activities aiding mental well-being

Mental health and psychosocial support (MHPSS) refers to a broad range of activities intended to protect or promote psychosocial well-being and to prevent or treat mental health conditions. The term is widely used in humanitarian emergencies, forced displacement, armed conflict, disasters, epidemics, and other settings of adversity. MHPSS emphasizes that mental health is shaped not only by individual psychological symptoms, but also by social relationships, family and community support, safety, culture, livelihoods, education, protection, and access to services.

== Definition and scope ==
MHPSS is a multi-sectoral field that includes both mental health care and psychosocial support. Activities may range from basic services that protect dignity and safety to family and community supports, focused non-specialized interventions, and specialized mental health services. The term is used by humanitarian, health, protection, education, and social service actors to describe coordinated responses to psychological distress, social disruption, and mental health needs in crisis-affected populations.

== Guiding frameworks ==
A major reference point for the field is the Inter-Agency Standing Committee (IASC) Guidelines on Mental Health and Psychosocial Support in Emergency Settings, first published in 2007. The IASC guidelines describe MHPSS as a multi-sectoral area of humanitarian response and emphasize human rights, participation, community resources, cultural appropriateness, coordination, and the avoidance of harm.

A commonly used organizing model is the IASC intervention pyramid. The pyramid describes four layers of support: basic services and security; community and family supports; focused, non-specialized supports; and specialized services. The model is intended to show that MHPSS should not be limited to clinical care, but should include social, community-based, and systems-level supports.

== Applications ==
MHPSS approaches are used in a wide range of humanitarian and development settings, including armed conflict, forced displacement, natural disasters, epidemics, and refugee resettlement. Activities may include psychological first aid, safe spaces for children and families, community-based psychosocial support, group-based support, referral pathways, integration of mental health into primary care, training for frontline workers, and specialized clinical services. Research on conflict-affected populations has also emphasized that mental health outcomes are shaped not only by exposure to traumatic events, but also by ongoing daily stressors, social conditions, and post-displacement adversity.

In refugee resettlement contexts, MHPSS approaches have been adapted to address trauma exposure, post-migration stressors, social isolation, language barriers, discrimination, and difficulties accessing health and social services. Research on refugee mental health has emphasized the importance of multi-tiered and culturally responsive systems of care that combine specialized services with community-based, family-based, and non-specialized supports.

MHPSS is also applied to both physical health and mental health best practices in humanitarian crisis and social development. It is currently the World Health Organization (WHO) open standard for community health, which led the Mental Health Innovation Network to create a series of guides with the International Red Cross and Red Crescent Movement.

Based on that, the United Nations Education Science Culture Organization (UNESCO) developed MHPSS education in emergency (EiE) open educational resources (OER) and Trinity College a microcredential course on the field.
