= Steven Tsuchida =

American film and television director

- Born: Steven K. Tsuchida; United States
- Occupation: Director

Steven K. Tsuchida is an American film and television director. He has directed episodes of The Sarah Silverman Program, Younger, Community, Dear White People, and the award-winning short film A Ninja Pays Half My Rent. A Ninja Pays Half My Rent was featured on the premiere of the Comedy Central program Atom TV.

In 2018, he directed Freeform's Life-Size 2 starring Tyra Banks and Francia Raisa, and the 2021 romantic film Resort to Love. In 2023, he directed the Netflix original film, A Tourist's Guide to Love.
