= Declaration on the Protection of Women and Children in Emergency and Armed Conflict =

1974 declaration by the UN General Assembly

The Declaration on the Protection of Women and Children in Emergency and Armed Conflict was adopted by the United Nations in 1974. It was proposed by the United Nations Economic and Social Council, on the grounds that women and children are often the victims of wars, civil unrest, and other emergency situations that cause them to suffer "inhuman acts and consequently suffer serious harm".

== Overview ==
The Declaration states that women and children suffer victimization during armed conflict due to "suppression, aggression, colonialism, racism, alien domination and foreign subjugation". The Declaration specifically prohibits attacks and bombing of civilian populations (Article 1) and the use of chemical and biological weapons on civilian populations (Article 2). Article 3 requires states to abide by the Geneva Protocol of 1925 and the Geneva Convention of 1949. The Declaration also requires countries to take measures to end "persecution, torture, punitive measures, degrading treatment and violence" especially when they are targeted against women and children, as well as recognizing "imprisonment, torture, shooting, mass arrests, collective punishment, destruction of dwellings, and forcible evictions" as criminal acts.

Certain inalienable rights are also enshrined in the Declaration, such as access to food, shelter, and medical care, which are to be provided to women and children caught in emergency situations.

Finally, the Declaration cites the binding nature of other international law instruments, naming the Universal Declaration of Human Rights, the International Covenant on Civil and Political Rights, International Covenant on Economic, Social and Cultural Rights, Declaration of the Rights of the Child.

== See also ==
- Children in emergencies and conflicts
- Geneva Protocol
- Military use of children
- Refugee
- Violence against women
- War rape
