= Kiki Sukezane =

Japanese actress

Kiki Sukezane 祐真 キキ
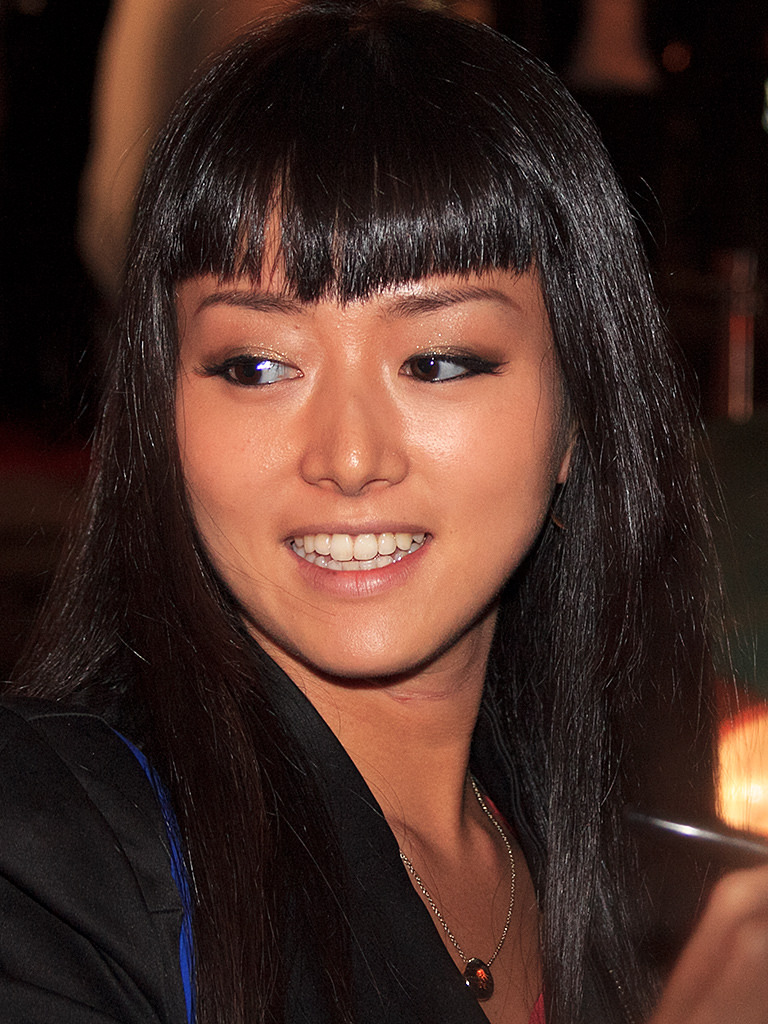
- Sukezane at the 2015 Toronto International Film Festival
- Born: April 5, 1989 (age 37); Kyoto, Kyoto Prefecture, Japan
- Other name: Kiki
- Occupation: Actress
- Years active: 2012–present
- Height: 1.55 m (5 ft 1 in)
- Website: sukezane-kiki.amebaownd.com

Kiki Sukezane (祐真 キキ, Sukezane Kiki; born April 5, 1989) is a Japanese actress from Kyoto, Kyoto Prefecture, working mostly in American productions.

== Biography ==
Kiki Sukezane was born to parents both of Samurai descent, into a local family noted for its ancestry, whose surname can be traced back to swordsmiths from the 13th century; some ancestors were involved in the 1860 Sakuradamon Incident on the side of the Rōnin, and others were Ochimusha under the Taira clan. Her paternal uncle, Tomoki Sukezane (Japanese: 祐真朋樹), is a noted stylist and fashion magazine editor.

Sukezane spent a year in the United States as a foreign exchange student in South Dakota and learned English. Sukezane attended acting school in Tokyo for two years before moving to Los Angeles, Los Angeles County, California, in 2012 to pursue roles in Hollywood.

In her first major break she played Miko Otomo/Katana Girl in NBC's Heroes Reborn miniseries from 2015 to 2016. She followed it up with roles in Netflix's Lost in Space and Earthquake Bird, HBO's Westworld and more recently AMC's The Terror: Infamy. Sukezane lives in Los Angeles and is a lesbian.

== Filmography ==
=== Film ===
Year	Title	Role	Notes
2017	High&Low The Movie 2 / End of Sky		
2017	High&Low The Movie 3 / Final Mission		
2019	Earthquake Bird	Natsuko	
2021	Bashira	Maya Shitara	

=== Television ===
Year	Title	Role	Notes
2013-2014	The Yokai King	Nuko	Main cast, 13 episodes
2015-2016	Heroes Reborn	Miko Otomo/Katana Girl	Main cast, 13 episodes
2018	Westworld	Sakura	2 episodes
2018	Lost in Space	Aiko Watanabe	Recurring role, 5 episodes
2019	The Terror	Yuko	Main cast (Season 2), 10 episodes
