= Guardian Girls International =

US-based non-governmental organization

- Abbreviation: GGI
- Formation: 2019; 7 years ago
- Founder: Shin Koyamada; Nia Lyte
- Type: International NGO
- Headquarters: United States
- Location: 15 countries
- Region served: Global
- Services: Women's self-defense Capacity building Community service
- Fields: Gender-based violence Violence against women
- Official language: English
- Co-Founder & Chairman: Shin Koyamada
- Co-Founder & President: Nia Lyte
- Affiliations: Koyamada International Foundation
- Website: guardiangirls.org

Guardian Girls International (also referred to as Guardian Girls or GGI) is an international non-governmental organization focused on violence against women and gender-based violence, with its headquarters in the United States. The mission is to build the self-agency of women and girls for prevention and response to all forms of gender-based violence through sports and holistic martial arts training. It operates in 15 countries.

It partners and collaborates with UN agencies, international sports federations, governments, international NGOs and corporations, including with United Nations Population Fund (UNFPA), World Karate Federation (WKF), International Aikido Federation (IAF), International Judo Federation (IJF) and others.

== History ==
The GGI was initially born out of the pledge Koyamada has made during the International Conference on Population and Development (ICPD), which was convened by the UNFPA and governments of Kenya and Denmark in Nairobi, Kenya, in 2019.

== Structure ==
The organization was established with the primary objective of overseeing its Guardian Girls program and coordinating specialized sports projects on a global scale. These projects are initiated through collaborations between GGI and international sports federations responsible for governing specific sports worldwide.

All activities are coordinated by GGI at a global level and by KIF's National Chapters, where applicable, at a national level, adhering to its international program guidelines worldwide. Project implementation is overseen either by GGI or a KIF Chapter, working in collaboration with the national sports governing body of the relevant international sports federations.

== Projects ==
Guardian Girls Karate (GGK) is a global project launched in partnership with the World Karate Federation (WKF) in Los Angeles in 2022. In 2023, the initiative expanded globally, marked by a reception at the Japanese Ambassador's residence, a women's self-defense seminar, and a demonstration held at WKF's international tournaments across seven diverse countries including Egypt, Morocco, Spain, Japan, the United States, Ireland, and Hungary.

Guardian Girls Aikido (GGA) is a global project launched in collaboration with the International Aikido Federation (IAF) in February in Bogotá, Colombia in 2024. The launch reception was held at the Japanese Ambassador's residence, hosted by the Koyamada International Foundation Colombia (KIF Colombia), the Embassy of Japan in Colombia, and UNFPA Colombia, with support from IAF, Latin America Aikido Federation (ULA) and Colombia Aikido Federation (FCA). This event was followed by the GGA's self-defense seminar, which provided empowerment and training to Colombian women in Bogotá. Later, the GGA was launched in Tokyo, Japan, in April 2024, followed by its expansion to Lima, Peru, in June 2024.
