= Wendy Wu: Homecoming Warrior =

2006 television film directed by John Laing

- Promotional poster
- Genre: Action comedy; Fantasy; Kung fu
- Written by: Vince Cheung; Ben Montanio; Mark Seabrooks; Lydia Look
- Directed by: John Laing
- Starring: Brenda Song
- Voices of: Hadley Hudson
- Music by: Nathan Wang
- Country of origin: United States
- Original language: English

Production
- Executive producer: Ralph Farquhar
- Producer: Janine Dickins
- Cinematography: Kevin Riley
- Editor: Owen Ferrier-Kerr
- Running time: 90 minutes
- Production companies: Rubicon Films, LTD.; Regan/Jon Productions
- Budget: $5 million

Original release
- Network: Disney Channel
- Release: June 16, 2006

Wendy Wu: Homecoming Warrior is a 2006 American martial arts fantasy film released as a Disney Channel Original Movie (DCOM) and starring Brenda Song. The voice of Hadley Hudson is also featured. The story follows a Chinese monk who visits the title character. Wendy is a Chinese-American teenager, claimed to be the reincarnation of a powerful female warrior. She is also the only person who can prevent a spirit of an ancient and evil Chinese dragon named Yan-Lo, from destroying the world.

This film had more than 5.7 million viewers on the night of its premiere making Wendy Wu: Homecoming Warrior the fifth highest viewed DCOM at the time. It also received the highest rating in the history of Disney Channel Japan. The film also broke records in the United Kingdom and Europe, making Disney Channel the highest rated kids’ channel in Europe.

The film was shot almost entirely in Auckland, New Zealand. Wendy Wu: Homecoming Warrior was the second DCOM to be added on the iTunes Store. Disney released several products to promote the film. A sequel was scheduled to begin filming in early 2008, but was eventually cancelled.

== Plot ==
Wendy Wu is a rich and popular Chinese-American teenager whose life is turned upside down by a visit from Shen, a cousin young Buddhist monk. He claims that Wendy is the reincarnation of a mighty female warrior and the only one who can prevent an evil spirit from destroying the world. Shen begs Wendy to wear a powerful amulet, which will protect her from evil until he can fully train her in martial arts.

Wendy is too busy campaigning for Homecoming Queen against Jessica Dawson, her school rival, to be concerned about saving the world. Wendy's traditional grandmother knows that Shen is speaking the truth; her own mother (Wendy's great-grandmother) was the previous Yin Warrior who defeated Yan-Lo in China 90 years earlier. However, the other members of Wendy's family have lost touch with their Chinese heritage. Shen's discussion of Chinese culture inspires Wendy's mother, a researcher at Fair Springs National History Museum. Shen's mooncakes do the same for Wendy's father. However, faced with the choice between fighting evil and going shopping, Wendy chooses to go to the mall with her best friends Tory and Lisa.

Yan-Lo soon materializes and sets out to destroy Wendy before she can attain her full Yin Warrior powers. In quick succession, Yan-Lo possesses a security guard at the museum, Wendy's brother, her dog, her principal, her teachers, Tory, and finally Jessica. Wendy breaks up with her boyfriend Austin after noticing how toxic and self-absorbed he is. She then starts to bond more with Shen. With Shen's help, Wendy's teachers are possessed by the souls of the Five Animals of Chinese martial arts to help teach her. Mr. Medina becomes the Tiger; coach Gibbs becomes the Snake; Mr. Tobias becomes the Crane; Mr. Garibay becomes the Leopard; and Shen himself becomes the Dragon.

Wendy completes her training and learns that she has become Homecoming Queen. She then discovers that her battle takes place the same night of the Homecoming Dance. Feeling betrayed, she opts out of the battle. On the night of Homecoming, her grandmother insists that Wendy fulfill her destiny, but she refuses. However, Wendy changes her mind upon learning from the monks that Shen has gone to the battle alone. She and the monks arrive to save Shen just in time. Wendy's martial arts training unleashes her inner heroine for a final fight with Yan-Lo, freeing Jessica from his possession.

Wendy decides to hand over the Homecoming crown and Queen status Jessica, having realized what's really important in life, and the conflict between the two is put to rest. The heroes are about to leave when Yan-Lo returns in his true form, and the battle continues. Shen attempts to sacrifice himself, as it is his destiny, but Wendy saves him by changing his destiny. Wendy and Shen attack Yan-Lo together, destroying him forever. The monks tell Shen this is his last life, and they ascend. In the final scene, Wendy and Shen leave to get cappuccinos and chocolate, which Shen said he loved earlier in the movie. This implies that the two might begin dating.

== Cast ==
- Brenda Song as Wendy Wu
- Shin Koyamada as Shen
- Susan Chuang as Nina Wu
- Tsai Chin as Grandma Wu
- Justin Chon as Peter Wu
- Michael David Cheng as Kenny Wu
- Andy Fischer-Price as Austin
- Ellen Woglom as Jessica Dawson
- Hadley Hudson as Yan-Lo
- Paul A. Willis as Principal Frank Nunan
- James Gaylyn as Mr. Medina
- Sally Stockwell as Coach Gibbs
- Timothy Raby as Mr. Tobias
- Michael Saccente as Mr. Garibay
- Sally Martin as Tory
- Anna Hutchison as Lisa
- Heff DelFino as Pizza Delivery Man
- Geoff Dolan as Museum Security Guard

== Release ==
The premiere of Wendy Wu: Homecoming Warrior aired at 8 p.m. Eastern Time on June 16, 2006, including a telecast hosted by Brenda Song and the movie's cast. The movie premiered on Toon Disney on May 12, 2008. The film aired on ABC Family on June 20, 2006, as part of its Jetix block, making the film the only Disney Channel Original Movie to be aired on that channel.

On Saturday, August 18, Disney Channel aired "Wendy Wu: Homecoming Chat". The stars of the movie answered questions posed by fans.

The "Kick'in" version of the film first aired on February 19, 2007, in United States and on April 14, 2008, in Canada. This version includes new footage of the cast and five never-before-seen scenes. The "Remixed" version aired on September 8, 2007, in which the cast answered questions and taught the viewers kung-fu moves.

=== Ratings ===
Wendy Wu had more than 5.7 million viewers on the night of its premiere, making it the fifth highest viewed DCOM at the time. The film was originally set to air on June 2, 2006, but was pushed back by Disney Channel due to technical difficulties involving film's official website. The film exceeded its competition on basic cable channels, ranking No. 1 with children 6–11 (2.1 million/9.5 rating) and adolescents 9–14 (2.1 million/8.6 rating) at the time. The movie also gained 1.2 million viewers start-to-finish, with 6.0 million Total Viewers watching the movie's final quarter-hour (4.8 million to 6.0 million).

Wendy Wu exceeded year-ago time period numbers, delivering triple-digit gains in total viewers (178%, 5,649,000 vs. 2,050,000), Kids 6–11 (132%, 8.8/2,129,000 vs. 3.8/933,000) and Tweens 9–14 (187%, 8.6/2,120,000 vs. 3.0/731,000).

== Reception ==
UltimateDisney.com said that the movie relies on stereotypes, but also that Song shone as the title character. The San Francisco Asian American Film Festival considered the character a strong protagonist and good role model. In an interview with Asiance magazine, Song described how she identified with the character struggling to keep her heritage. A BellaOnline review commended Disney for the strong Asian cast and noted that it is rare to see a female martial arts star with a black belt.

== Production ==
=== Filming locations ===
The movie was set in California, and some scenes were filmed in Disney Studios, United States. However, much of it was shot on location in Auckland, New Zealand, to accommodate action unit director Koichi Sakamoto, who also choreographed Power Rangers in Auckland, primarily at Studio West in West Auckland. Parts of it were shot at Long Bay College, a high school in Auckland. Many drama students from Long Bay College were used as extras, and they can be seen chiefly in the school scenes. It took 24 days to shoot the movie in New Zealand according to Brenda Song. The cast then promoted the movie and the trailer to Disney Channel fans. Disney promoted the movie in various countries including Malaysia, Japan and Australia.

=== Casting ===
The film was shot on a budget of $5 million. Song trained for more than 2 weeks, 16 hours each day. Although Song had stunt doubles for some scenes, she did most of her own stunt work for the film with guidance from Koichi Sakamoto, executive producer for the Power Rangers franchise. Song was inspired to endure the stunt training by the way her mother dealt with breast cancer in 2005.

Several actors from this movie had previously appeared in the Power Rangers series. Sally Martin and Anna Hutchison both portrayed actual Rangers: Martin was the Blue Ranger (also named Tori Hanson) in 2003's Ninja Storm, and Hutchison was the Yellow Ranger in 2008's Jungle Fury. Additional actors in this film that appeared in Power Rangers include James Gaylyn (Ninja Storm, Dino Thunder, S.P.D, Operation Overdrive, RPM, Dino Super Charge and Beast Morphers), Geoff Dolan (Mystic Force, Samurai, Megaforce, and Ninja Steel), Sally Stockwell (Mystic Force), and Shin Koyamada (Wild Force).

This film contains so many martial arts sequences that Disney had to rate it TV-PG. Wendy Wu: Homecoming Warrior is the eighth DCOM to receive a TV-PG rating; before it were Tiger Cruise, Don't Look Under the Bed, Halloweentown, Halloweentown II: Kalabar's Revenge, Jett Jackson: The Movie, Mom's Got A Date With A Vampire, and Twitches.

Song commuted during film breaks to film the second season of The Suite Life of Zack & Cody.

=== Setting ===
The movie takes place in the fictional city of Fair Springs, California. According to a local weather report that Wendy sees on TV, Fair Springs is located around the actual city of Modesto, California. The evil spirit Yan Lo is named after Yamarāja, the lord of death in Buddhist and Hindu philosophy. The name Yan Lo is a shortened Chinese transliteration of Yamarāja's name.

== Home media ==
Wendy Wu: Homecoming Warrior was released on DVD on October 24, 2006.

== Soundtrack ==
- "Go (Jump! Mix)"; performed by Jupiter Rising
- "Will it Go 'Round in Circles?"; performed by Orlando Brown
- "Dance Alone"; performed by Sweet James
- "Keepin' It"; performed by Drew Seeley

== Cancelled sequel ==
In October 2007, Variety reported a sequel to Wendy Wu: Homecoming Warrior. It was hinted in the DVD's alternate ending where Yan-Lo is revealed to be possessing the Wu family's dog, unbeknownst to everyone else. Filming would have been shot in early 2008, but the sequel was eventually cut from the schedule, and no further announcements have been made. The sequel to Wendy Wu: Homecoming Warrior has since been cancelled.
