= Shadow Glass =

- Directed by: Jay Lee
- Written by: Jay Lee
- Produced by: Shin Koyamada; Nia Lyte
- Starring: Ava Hall
- Cinematography: Jay Lee
- Edited by: Jay Lee
- Music by: Bill Prokopow
- Production company: Shinobi Pictures
- Distributed by: Shinobi Pictures
- Release date: 2021
- Running time: 14 minutes
- Country: United States
- Language: English

Shadow Glass is a 2021 American drama short film written and directed by Jay Lee (Sony Pictures' Zombie Strippers), and produced by Shin Koyamada.

== Plot ==
Zoey floats through life in a deprivation chamber of insomnia and anxiety, drowning in self-destructive thoughts. Time has no meaning, darkness envelops her. She uncontrollably erupts into bouts of anguish where the siren's song of substance abuse promises to ease her pain, secretly becoming her true master. Her shame and self-loathing is a prison from which she lies to family and friends, assuring them that she has everything under control. But in a rare, lucid moment, Zoey will try to reclaim herself with her music.

== Cast ==
- Ava Hall - Zoey
- Jackson Englund - Nick
- Christina Higa - Nora

== Film Festivals and Awards ==
Award	Year	Category	Result
Los Angeles Film Awards	2021	Best Indie Short	Won
Los Angeles Film Awards	2021	Best Actress In An Indie Film	Won
New York Film Awards	2021	Best Indie Film	Won
Cannes World Film Festival	2021	Best Psychological Film	Won
Canada Shorts Film Festival	2021	Best Picture	Finalist
Tokyo International Shorts Film Festival	2021	Best Picture	Finalist
Hollywood Independent Filmmaker Awards and Festival	2021	Best Picture	Official Selection
Hong Kong International Short Film Festival	2021	Best Picture	Official Selection
Kalakari International Film Festival	2021	Best Picture	Official Selection

== See also ==
- Mental health
