= List of Heroes Reborn characters =

This is a list of fictional characters from Heroes Reborn, an "event miniseries" which aired in 2015 as a continuation of the story of the television series Heroes. It tells the story of ordinary people discovering that they have the powers of "evolved" humans, or Evos, at a time when Evos are being hunted down and killed, blamed for a bombing that destroyed the Odessa Peace Summit to unite humans and Evos.

== Main characters ==
=== Noah Bennet ===
Noah Bennet (Jack Coleman), also known as HRG, a moniker earned from his identifying horn-rimmed glasses. In the original series, he was Claire's adoptive father, and worked for Primatech, a company that tried to regulate and contain Evos. When the terrorist bombing of the Odessa Peace Summit apparently killed Claire, Noah begins a desperate search for the answers that he seems to have forgotten. In the end, Noah sacrifices himself to save the world from an extinction-level event by allowing himself to be used as a conduit for his grandchildren's powers.

- Ability: None

=== Luke Collins ===
Luke (Zachary Levi) attended the Odessa Peace Summit with his wife Joanne and son Dennis. When Dennis was killed in the bombing, Luke and Joanne started murdering Evos in revenge. However, Luke begins to manifest powers, leading him to leave everything behind and attempt suicide. He is saved by Malina, and joins her quest to find destiny. He is a dentist by profession. Luke dies buying time for Malina to save the world by propelling himself into the first massive solar flare and sacrificing himself to dissipate it harmlessly.

- Ability: Solar absorption and radiation emission

=== Tommy Clark ===
Tommy (Robbie A. Kay) is a teenager who has been constantly moving around with his mom to hide his powers. During the series they are living in Illinois, where Tommy meets and falls in love with his classmate Emily. His real name is Nathan Bennet, Claire's son, one of the twins whom Angela Petrelli predicted would save the world; he was born on the day of the bombing, but Hiro Nakamura took him back to 1999 to protect him and raise him. While he is initially believed to be a teleporter, his true ability is to steal the power of the last Evo he was in contact with, and his teleporting is a manifestation of Hiro's stolen ability, which Hiro taught him how to use. After being informed of his true powers and identity, Tommy regains the ability to manipulate time. He is recruited by Erica Kravid, who needs his power to send people to the future for her plan to save the world. Working with Malina and Noah Bennet, Tommy is able to save the world from an extinction-level event, but at the loss of Noah. Afterwards, Tommy is shown to be living a normal life and dating Emily.

- Ability: Empathic power absorption (acquired space-time manipulation)

=== Miko Otomo ===
Miko (Kiki Sukezane) is a girl living alone in Tokyo. With the help of gamer Ren Shimosawa, she finds her father's sword, which when unsheathed teleports her to the world of the video game Evernow. She learns that she is not the daughter of Hachiro Otomo, but rather the game avatar Katana Girl brought to life by Hachiro's power to rescue Hiro Nakamura from inside the game. Even though she knows she will disappear when he is released, she chooses to save him, and ends up in Gateway, the city of the future. The real Miko, who was in a car accident, is kept on life support in Gateway to ensure Hachiro's compliance with Renautas. Katana Girl starts fading from existence, but before she disappears completely, she rescues Tommy from Erica, confesses that she loves Ren, and kills Harris Prime in a duel at Sunstone Manor. Its later revealed that Katana Girl was sent back to Evernow where she aids Ren in rescuing Tommy before the game world dies and her along with it. The real Miko Otomo is rescued by Ren and Emily Duval and is later seen sparring with Ren three months after the end of the world is averted.

- Ability: Teleportation between Evernow and reality

=== Carlos Gutierrez ===
Carlos (Ryan Guzman) is a war hero who lives in Los Angeles with his brother Oscar and nephew José. When Oscar is murdered by a cop, Carlos discovers that his brother was El Vengador, a vigilante Evo fighting the LAPD to help smuggle other Evos out of the country. Although he struggles to come to terms with this revelation, Carlos chooses to put on the mask of El Vengador to help his friends in danger. His medal of honor was given to him when his partner, Farah Nazan, gave him the credit for her actions in the field. Carlos modified and upgraded Oscar's El Vengador suit to include Kevlar armor and a hydraulic motor for durability and increased strength. Carlos later raids Sunstone Manor to rescue his nephew and friend Father Mauricio. He succeeds in rescuing them as well as Farah, Micah Sanders and several other trapped evos. Three months after the world is saved, he continues his work as El Vengador with Farah as his partner.

- Ability: None

=== Malina ===
Malina (Danika Yarosh) is first seen travelling in the Arctic Circle, accompanied by Farah. She knows that she has a destiny, and that a catastrophe is coming to Earth. Her full name is Malina Bennet, and she is Claire's daughter, Tommy's twin sister. She starts travelling South to meet with her destiny; after Farah is captured, her only clue is a photo of Tommy that leads her to join forces with Luke. With the help of Luke and Quentin Frady, Malina eventually reaches Odessa, Texas, where the prophecy states that she and Tommy will save the world. With Tommy boosting her powers and Noah Bennet acting as her conduit, Malina is able to stop the end of the world at the cost of her grandfather's life. At Union Wells High School, her mother's school, she receives a tarot card, a warning of her father's impending return.

- Ability: Biological and elemental manipulation

=== Joanne Collins ===
Joanne (Judith Shekoni) was with Luke and their son Dennis at the Odessa Peace Summit. After Dennis's death, she blames Luke for wanting to go to the Summit in the first place, and fuels their hunt to take revenge on all Evos. When Luke manifests powers, she can't bring herself to kill him, but walks away from their remaining partnership. She is hired by Erica Kravid to kill Malina Bennet, and when she tries to shoot Malina, Luke incinerates her.

- Ability: None

=== Erica Kravid ===
Erica (Rya Kihlstedt) is the CEO of Renautas, the company that bought Primatech and took over as the leading researcher on Evos. Angela Petrelli trusted her with the knowledge of the coming catastrophe and the Evos who could stop it, but Erica's goal is to reshape the world how she wants. She has discovered a way to mechanize an Evo's power by connecting their brain to machines. It was at her order that the Odessa Peace Summit was bombed, and she framed Mohinder Suresh for it. She created the future city Gateway and planned to transport the people she chose to the future to save the human race from destruction. In her past, she slept with an Evo in return for him saving her father with his powers, and later killed him to keep her daughter Taylor. She is erased from existence when Tommy Clark strands her in the future before changing it by saving the world.

- Ability: None

=== Emily Duval ===
Emily (Gatlin Green) is one of Tommy's classmates in Illinois. When she discovers his powers, she agrees to keep it a secret, and encourages him to learn more about them, telling him that it's okay to accept that he is not normal. They start dating. Caspar Abraham tries to take her memories of Tommy once, but realizes that she is in love and chooses not to take that away. Tommy discovers the ability to freeze time while saving her life. She later teams up with Ren to rescue Tommy from Evernow and three months after the world is saved, is shown to still be in a relationship with him.

- Ability: None

=== Quentin Frady ===
Quentin (Henry Zebrowski) is a conspiracy theorist who started working as a temp at Renautas in order to find out what had happened to his sister, Phoebe Frady. He tracks down Noah Bennet and shows him that something is wrong with what happened at the Odessa Peace Summit. When Quentin and Noah infiltrate Renautas, Quentin stops his sister from using her powers to drain the other Evos, but in the process she kills him. After Noah travels back in time, Quentin is alive again, but now working for Erica due to Noah's alterations to the timeline. Despite this, he shows moral reservations about their cause when he is told to kill Malina. He joins Luke and Malina when he acknowledges that Phoebe is no longer the sister he knew. Quentin helps Luke protect Malina, eventually killing Phoebe to save her. Three months after the world is saved, Quentin is held captive in a secret government facility as the government wants to know who saved the world and they know Quentin was there. Quentin just tells them that it's an awakening now and the heroes are ordinary people who were put in a situation that made them extraordinary and just want to be left alone until they are needed again.

- Ability: None

== Recurring characters ==
=== Molly Walker ===
Molly Walker (Francesca Eastwood), a returning character from the original series, is an Evo with a power that Erica desperately needs, the ability to locate any Evo on the planet. She is captured and used to launch E.P.I.C., a technology with the same power. However, she refuses to reveal to Erica the location of Claire's children, and when Noah shows up to rescue her she shoots herself in the head to protect them. When Noah time travels back to the Odessa Peace Summit, Molly is seen amongst the attendees and is given Mohinder's research before the bombing.

- Ability: Clairvoyance (locating any Evo in the world)

=== Caspar Abraham ===
Caspar (Pruitt Taylor Vince) is a mysterious Evo protecting Tommy. He once worked with Noah Bennet at Primatech, and helps him escape from Renautas at the Peace Summit. He agrees to protect Nathan for Noah, erasing all of Noah's memories of Nathan and keeping other people from finding out about Nathan either. When Hiro sacrifices himself to protect Nathan, Caspar erases all of his memories of Hiro as well so that Nathan won't go after him. Caspar was killed by Joanne while trying to protect Emily.

- Ability: Stores memories inside pennies and can also return them

=== Ren Shimosawa ===
Ren (Toru Uchikado) is a Japanese vlogger and video gamer who meets Miko when he goes searching for the secret of the Katana Girl in Evernow. He tells her where Katana Girl's sword is kept, and helps her search for her father, in both reality and with his avatar in Evernow. After Katana Girl disappears, her father Hachiro Otomo gives Ren the task of stopping Renautas, and he teams up with Emily Duval. Ren and Emily are able to rescue several evos held captive by Renautas in the future including Hachiro and the real Miko Otomo. Once free, Hachiro sends Ren into Evernow to rescue Tommy Clark. With the help of Katana Girl, Ren rescues Tommy and is transported back to the present by him. Three months later, Ren spars with the real Miko as Hachiro watches.

- Ability: None

=== Mauricio Chavez ===
Father Mauricio (Carlos Lacamara) helped Oscar's underground railroad for Evos in Los Angeles, and after Oscar's death, he gives Carlos advice and support. He was kidnapped by Dearing of the LAPD to get to El Vengador. While being rescued by Carlos from Sunstone Manor, he was shot and killed by a guard.

- Ability: Mist mimicry

=== James Dearing ===
James Dearing (Dylan Bruce) is a corrupt LAPD police chief who lived a double life as a bounty hunter bringing captured Evos to Sunstone Manor in exchange for money. He was present when Oscar was killed, and Carlos is determined to get revenge on him. When the LAPD receives the E.P.I.C. technology from Renautas to find unregistered Evos, his power is revealed and he is nearly arrested. He helps Carlos infiltrate Sunstone Manor, but is once again revealed, and killed by Matt Parkman.

- Ability: Enhanced strength

=== José Gutierrez ===
José (Lucius Hoyos) is Oscar's son and Carlos' nephew. After Oscar's death, Carlos takes care of him. He is a fan of El Vengador, and discovers the hideout that Oscar used. He is later captured and taken to Sunstone Manor but rescued by Carlos and Farah. Three months later, Jose asks Farah and Carlos when he can join them in crime fighting to their amusement.

- Ability: Phasing

=== Oscar Gutierrez ===
Oscar (Marco Grazzini) is also the famous vigilante El Vengador. He is Carlos's brother and José's father. He used his power to help Evos flee the country through an underground railroad. As El Vengador, he is trying to stop an apparent mugging when he is ambushed. He returns to his shop and asks his brother to take up the mantle of El Vengador and carry on his work before dying in Carlos's arms. Oscar's death was set up by James Dearing for interfering with his corrupt police activities.

- Ability: Enhanced strength

=== Farah Nazan ===
Farah (Nazneen Contractor) watches over Malina. She took the girl to Alaska in order to hide her from Renautas. When she tries to take Malina south to follow her destiny, they are discovered, and Harris captured her. She is also Carlos' ex-girlfriend, and is working for Angela Petrelli in protecting Malina. She reunites with Carlos at Sunstone Manor, but is badly wounded when she takes a bullet for Malina. Jose is able to remove the bullet with his powers and Farah eventually recovers. Three months later, she fights crime in Los Angeles with Carlos as his alter-ego El Vengador's partner.

- Ability: Invisibility

=== Taylor Kravid ===
Taylor (Eve Harlow) is Erica Kravid's daughter. She works with her partner Francis to capture Molly Walker for Renautas, but when Francis is detained after the task, she loses trust in her mother, leading her to help Noah and Quentin infiltrate the company. She is pregnant with Francis's child. Though her father was an Evo with healing powers, she has never developed an ability of her own, until she manifests her child's powers.

- Ability: None

=== Francis Culp ===
Francis Culp (Peter Mooney) is the partner and love interest of Taylor Kravid, and helps her with the job of capturing Molly Walker. Despite Taylor's feelings, Erica Kravid has him captured and held with the other Evos under her control. Although it was assumed by Taylor that he died, he was eventually rescued from Sunstone Manor by Carlos and Farah.

- Ability: Telekinesis

=== Harris ===
Harris (Clé Bennett) is a Renautas agent and security supervisor for Erica. His power lets him turn an amputated body part into a second body and regenerate the first body at the same time; his original body is identified as Harris Prime. He is the one who bombed the Odessa Peace Summit, on Erica's orders. Harris Prime faced Katana Girl in a one-on-one battle at Sunstone Manor, and Katana Girl killed him before she disappeared. His death destroyed all of his clones.

- Ability: Cloning

=== Dennis Collins ===
Dennis (Richie Lawrence) is the son of Luke and Joanne Collins. He has a disease that makes his skin burn very quickly when exposed to the sun, and admires the Evos as heroes; Luke had hopes that an Evo would be able to cure him. He was killed during the explosion that occurred on June 13 at the Odessa Peace Summit.

- Ability: None

=== Anne Clark ===
Anne (Krista Bridges) is Tommy's adoptive mother. She is the nurse who informs Noah and Angela Petrelli of Claire's death and the birth of her twins. After Hiro Nakamura got trapped in 1999, they raised Nathan Bennet together, until the day of the bombing. She continues to encourage Tommy to find his sister and stop the coming disaster. With Anne's help, Tommy rediscovers his resolve to save the world and learns that with his powers he is capable of "far more" than Hiro ever was with them.

- Ability: None

=== Hachiro Otomo ===
Hachiro (大友 八郎, Otomo Hachiro) (Hiro Kanagawa) is a Japanese video game designer/developer. He is the creator of the game Evernow, which is financed by Renautas. His daughter Miko was in a car accident, and his Evernow character Katana Girl is named after her. He agreed to work for Renautas because they are keeping Miko on life support. Hachiro and the real Miko were eventually rescued by Ren and Emily after being forced to trap Tommy Clark in Evernow. Hachiro sends Ren into Evernow to rescue Tommy and is sent back to the present by him with his daughter. Three months after the world was saved, Hachiro watches over Ren and Miko sparring, pleased.

- Ability: Transformations between matter and digital constructs and interact with virtual elements

=== Phoebe Frady ===
Phoebe (Aislinn Paul) is an Evo who has the ability to manipulate light and shadow, which allows her to nullify nearby Evos' abilities and disrupt electrical energy in her immediate surroundings. She is Quentin Frady's younger sister. Her disappearance on the Odessa Peace Summit kick-started Quentin's crusade for the truth and his search for Noah Bennet. She was originally being held against her will by Renautas but after the June 13 bombing and Erica's brainwashing she works with them willingly. In the original timeline she killed her brother, but after Noah altered time slightly, Phoebe brainwashed him into joining her and Renautas as a spy. Quentin eventually accepted that Renautas was using them and returned to the side of good, but Phoebe was too far gone to be saved. Refusing to be swayed from her fanatical belief in Erica Kravid's mission, Phoebe tried to kill Malina Bennet to stop her from saving the world. Recognizing that the sister he loved was gone and a monster had taken her place, Quentin shot Phoebe three times, sending her falling out of a broken window in the Odessa Clock Tower to her death. Quentin later crouched over her body, mourning Phoebe's death.

- Ability: Umbrakineses (allowing energy and ability suppression)
