= Koyamada International Foundation =

International non-governmental organization

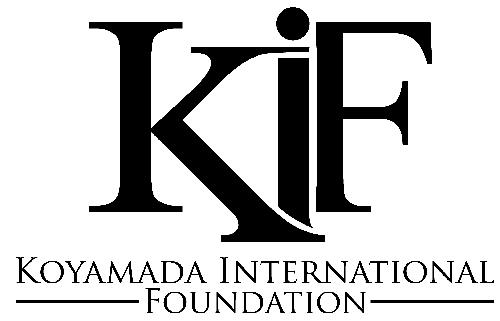
- Abbreviation: KIF
- Formation: 10 March 2008; 18 years ago
- Founder: Shin Koyamada; Nia Lyte
- Type: International NGO
- Headquarters: Japan
- Region served: Global
- Services: Youth leadership Gender Equality; Disaster relief Citizen exchanges Habitat; Space
- Methods: Community service
- Official language: All languages adopted by individual National Chapter Organizations as their official languages are the official languages of KIF
- Board Chairman: Shin Koyamada
- President: Nia Lyte
- Affiliations: Guardian Girls International
- Website: kifglobal.org
- Formerly called: Shin Koyamada Foundation

Koyamada International Foundation, commonly referred to as KIF or KIF Global, is an international non-governmental organization, promoting global peace and sustainable development. It has affiliated national chapter members in nine countries.

It has global partnerships with UN agencies and international organizations, such as United Nations Population Fund (UNFPA), UNICEF's Education Cannot Wait (ECW), World Karate Federation (WKF), Association of Medical Doctors of Asia (AMDA), and among others.

== History ==
The organization took shape through the shared passions of Shin Koyamada and TEDx Talk Speaker Nia Lyte. Initially, their efforts began with distributing relief provisions to underprivileged families in Downtown Los Angeles. Alongside a group of friends, they also championed cultural exchange activities spanning across the nation.

In 2011, KIF has established the first National Chapter in Japan in response to the Great East Japan earthquake, tsunami, and nuclear disaster, and expanded its operations and programs internationally in North America, Europe, South America, Africa, Australia, and New Zealand.

== Global Programs and Affiliation ==
=== Guardian Girls International ===
Operated worldwide by Guardian Girls International (GGI), an international nonprofit affiliated with the Koyamada International Foundation, the GGI works in partnership with governments, international sports federations, NGOs, UN agencies, and corporations. The mission is to advance gender equality and end violence against women and girls through sports, advocacy, education, and community engagement.

Conceived by Shin Koyamada at the UNFPA-hosted International Conference on Population and Development in Nairobi, the initiative was formalized through a 2019 MOU with UNFPA and expanded via partnerships with international sports federations. Its first specialized global project, Guardian Girls Karate, launched in October 2022 with the World Karate Federation (WKF), followed by additional global projects in collaboration with partners such as the United Nations Population Fund (UNFPA), United Nations University (UNU), Ju-Jitsu International Federation (JJIF) for Guardian Girls Ju-Jitsu (GGJJ) project, World Vovinam Federation (WVVF) for Guardian Girls Vovinam (GGV) project, World Karate Federation for Guardian Girls Karate (GGK) project and others. In addition, GGI has collaborated with the International Judo Federation for Guardian Girls Judo (GGJJ) and International Aikido Federation for Guardian Girls Aikido (GGA).

=== StarAngel ===
StarAngel program stands as an educational lifeline, specifically designed to offer quality learning resources for children and youth grappling with the aftermath of conflicts, natural disasters, and displacement in emergency and conflict zones. The program is administered by the StarAngel International on a global level.

In May 2020, KIF fortified its global dedication by joining hands with Education Cannot Wait (ECW), administered by UNICEF. This pivotal partnership was marked by the signing of a Memorandum of Understanding, aimed at bolstering ECW's extensive education programs. These programs cater to children and youth enduring the aftermath of conflicts, natural disasters, famine, displacement, and crises like the COVID-19 pandemic. Operating from the initial stages of crisis through recovery phases, KIF's national chapters in Latin America and Africa actively support ECW's mission.

Initiated by Koyamada International Foundation Colombia (KIF Colombia) in 2022 and 2023, the program has made significant strides across Colombia, furnishing hundreds of schools with essential educational materials and playgrounds

=== 1000 Ways To Give ===
1000 Ways To Give program serves as a vital disaster relief program dedicated to extending humanitarian aid and essential relief items to those impacted by natural disasters.

In response to the Great East Japan earthquake, tsunami, and subsequent Fukushima nuclear disaster, KIF swiftly launched a disaster relief program and established its inaugural national chapter, KIF Japan, headquartered in Tokyo. This chapter was specifically crafted to aid victims for all of those affected by the triple disaster. KIF orchestrated relief efforts by initiating fundraisers and coordinating the collection of relief goods and items in Southern California. These efforts culminated in shipping a 20-foot container filled with essential supplies to assist those in need.

Expanding its outreach, in 2019, KIF forged a strategic partnership with the Association of Medical Doctors of Asia (AMDA). This collaboration empowers AMDA to deliver crucial emergency medical aid to individuals affected by both natural calamities and human-induced disasters across Asia and other regions.

=== Zeal Up ===
Zeal Up stands as a dynamic youth leadership program designed to inspire the upcoming generations, fostering their ability to instigate meaningful community transformation and assume roles as engaged community leaders and global citizens. To achieve this, the program has forged collaborations with several universities, facilitating a series of speaker programs. These initiatives aim to empower students across various countries, nurturing a global mindset among the youth and encouraging proactive engagement in creating a better world.

KIF signed a Memorandum of Understanding with the Junior Chamber International (JCI) as a Global Partner in February 2019.

=== Subnational X ===
Subnational X is an international exchange program to foster mutual understanding and respect and strengthen people to people ties by implementing grassroots activities of cross-cultural, economic, sports and educational exchanges globally.

In between 2010 and 2011, KIF orchestrated the United States Martial Arts Festival (USMAF), a global event featuring 1,000 participants from 10 countries alongside renowned martial arts grandmasters. The aim was to champion peace through sports and cultivate a sustainable worldwide martial arts community. in 2013 and 2014, Hollywood stars Dylan Sprouse and Cole Sprouse engaged Japanese youth on education during KIF's United States-Japan Discovery Tour, shared widely on social media. KIF partnered with Sister Cities International (SCI) for bilateral summits, including the Japan-Texas Leadership Symposium in March 2019. Hosted by San Antonio and supported by Japanese Ministry of Foreign Affairs, it strengthened Japanese—American ties through cultural and economic exchanges.

=== Amazon Habitat ===
Amazon Habitat is a habitat program to help protect, preserve and promote tropical rainforests and wildlife in the Amazon Jungle in South America.

=== Safari Habitat ===
Safari Habitat is a habitat program to conserve wildlife habitat and preserve and promote cultural heritage of the indigenous peoples in Africa.

=== Spacestellar ===
Spacestellar is a space program to attract and engage young people globally to; interact with each other; share and deepen mutual interests, passions and understanding about outer space; cultivate strong team leadership skills; and gain knowledge and experience of space science and technology through space-themed activities.

== Structure ==
KIF Global is an international umbrella organization consisting of its global board of directors, management leaderships, standing committees and its national chapter members.

=== National chapter members ===
Each national chapter member is an independent nonprofit organization exclusively licensed to operate in a specific country, governed by its own national boards and officers with national committees, and funded by its supporters and contributors of a designated country. All members of national chapters are local chapter member organizations and individual and corporate members.

KIF National Chapter Members
KIF Chapter	Year:	country:	region:	Website
KIF USA	2013	United States	North America	
KIF Japan	2011	Japan	Asia	
KIF Colombia	2017	Colombia	South America	
KIF Brazil	2019	Brazil	South America	
KIF Kenya	2019	Kenya	Africa	
KIF Tanzania	2021	Tanzania	Africa	
KIF Ghana	2020	Ghana	Africa	
KIF Togo	2019	Togo	Africa	
KIF DR Congo	2020	Democratic Republic of the Congo	Africa	

== Partners ==
- World Karate Federation (WKF) - a partnership on Gender-based violence
- Association of Medical Doctors of Asia (AMDA) - a partnership on Disaster relief
