= The Yokai King =

- Genre: Action; Fantasy; Comedy
- Created by: Mark Hattori
- Starring: Shin Koyamada
- Country of origin: United States
- Original language: English

Production
- Executive producers: Mark Hattori Shigeru Igari Atsuhiro Tamaki; Yuki Miyazato
- Production locations: Okinawa, Japan; Los Angeles
- Cinematography: Nobuhiro Kuroishi
- Editor: Takeshi Chibana
- Camera setup: Multiple
- Running time: 30 minutes
- Production company: Okinawa Entertainment Studio

Original release
- Release: November 2013 – November 2013

The Yokai King is an American 13-episode television miniseries. The series, created by Mark Hattori, is based on the supernatural beings called yōkai from Japanese folklore. It was mainly filmed in various locations of Okinawa, Japan in 2014.

== Plot ==
Yokai are a class of supernatural creatures that have long held a prominent place in Japanese folklore. They come in a variety of forms, from hideous demons to mischievous creatures to heroes with supernatural powers. They are sometimes dangerous to humans since yokai are not restrained by the laws of nature and those who are not already part animal have the ability to shapeshift.

The legend goes that Ippei (Shin Koyamada) was found by his foster father in a coconut shell on a beach. Although he was brought up as a normal boy, Ippei could see nature’s spirits, including kijimuna, invisible to human eyes. As with many legendary heroes, Ippei was initially unaware of his supernatural talents and therefore his destiny.

== Cast ==
- Shin Koyamada as Ippei
- Lisa Nakama as Kana
- Saki as Osaki
- Kirk Dixon as Nyarl
- TJ Kayama as Shuten-dōji
- Nicholas Rush as Shachi
- Kiki Sukezane as Nuko
- Vanessa Pan as Gyuki
- Kingoro Torajima as Tengu
- Daisuke Onaga as Takeshi
- Kyoko Fukushi as Hahti
- Chesuka Hentona as Young Ippei
- Kougi Inoue as Awati

== Production ==
On November 11, 2013, Okinawa Entertainment Studio announced the production of the series at the media room of the Okinawa Prefecture Government in Naha, Okinawa Japan. The majority of the series filmed in various cities in Okinawa, Japan. It was shot on Red Epic.
