= Koyamada clan =

Koyamada clan (小山田氏, Koyamada-shi) is one of the Japanese samurai clans.

The Koyamada Clan was headquartered in the Satsuma Domain, which was one of the most powerful feudal domains in Tokugawa Japan, and played a major role in the Meiji Restoration and in the government of the Meiji period which followed.

== See also ==
- Oyamada Clan
