= Wine Road of the Samurai =

- Starring: Shin Koyamada
- Country of origin: Japan
- Original languages: English; Japanese; French; Arabic

Production
- Executive producers: Kenichi Hara; Shin Koyamada; Shinji Yamada
- Running time: 90 minutes

Original release
- Network: Japan News Network
- Release: March 21, 2006

Wine Road of The Samurai (ワイン大国を夢見た男達～侍達のワインロード～) is a feature film based on a true story about a delegation of 34 samurai to Europe in 1863, known as the Second Japanese Embassy to Europe (1863). It was first aired in Japan on March 21, 2006.

== Plot summary ==
34 Samurai in front of Sphinx in 1863

This documentary is about a group of samurai sent by the Japanese government to France at the end of the Edo period. At the time, all the ports of Japan were closed, cutting it off from the rest of the world. The samurai were sent to help solve diplomatic problems between Japan and Europe on December 29, 1863. They were welcomed by every government and head of state they visited, including Napoleon III, in France. They were also photographed standing in front of Sphinx, in Egypt. The samurai returned with many products from their trip, including a book on wine production. They ended their expedition earlier than expected due to the need to report home about the astonishing technology in modernized countries.

== Locations ==
- Yamagata, Japan
- Okayama, Japan
- Paris, France
- Burgundy, France
- Marseille, France
- Cairo, Egypt
- Alexandria, Egypt
- Luxor, Egypt

It was filmed on location over the course of a year. It was among the first feature documentary by JNN Network to be filmed in such a wide variety of locations. Director Eiji Sone shot a total of about 300 hours of footage.

== Cast ==
- Shin Koyamada—Himself, Narrator

== Crew ==
- Directed by: Eiji Sone
- Executive Produced by: Kenichi Hara
- Executive producer by: Shin Koyamada
- Produced by: Eiji Sone
- Produced by: Shinji Yamada

Executive Producer: Shannon C. Murphy

== Distribution ==
Japan

- Tokyo Broadcasting System (TBS)
- Hokkaido Broadcasting Co. Ltd.
- A TV Television Broadcasting Co. Ltd.
- IBC
- Tohoku Broadcasting Co. Ltd.
- TV-U Yamagata Inc.
- TV-U Fukushima Inc.
- Broadcasting System of Niigata Inc.
- U-TV Yamanashi Inc.
- Shin-Etsu Broadcasting Co. Ltd.
- Tulip-TV Inc.
- MRO
- Chubu-Nippon Broadcasting Company
- Mainichi Broadcasting System
- Sanyo Broadcasting Co. Ltd.
- RCC Broadcasting Co. Ltd.
- BSS Inc.
- TV Yamaguchi Broadcasting Systems Co. Ltd.
- I-Television Inc.
- KU-TV Inc.
- RKB Mainichi Broadcasting Corporation
- Nagasaki Broadcasting Co. Ltd.
- RKK Kumamoto Broadcasting Co. Ltd.
- Oita Broadcasting System Inc.
- Miyazaki Broadcasting Co. Ltd.
- Minaminihon Broadcasting Co. Ltd.
- Ryukyu Broadcasting Co. Ltd.

== Sponsors ==
Japan

- Toyota
- Santry
- Häagen-Dazs
- KDDI
- Jacomo
- ECC Junior
