= Child Friendly Spaces =

Safe area for children during emergencies

Child Friendly Spaces (CFS) are safe spaces set up in emergency settings to help support and protect children. Their objective is to restore a sense of normality and continuity to children whose lives have been disrupted by war, natural disaster, or other emergencies. They provide children with opportunities to develop, play, learn, and strengthen resiliency either after a crisis or during a protracted emergency in a safe, child friendly, and stimulating environment. NGOs or governments design and operate CFS in a participatory manner, often relying on community support. They are a short- to medium-term program response and often operate in tents or temporary structures. CFS are one of the most widely used child protection and psychosocial support interventions in emergencies. One reason for their popularity is that they offer potential for adaptability of activities to diverse contexts, rapid deployment, and low relative costs. Different agencies refer to CFS by different names including Child Centered Spaces (CCS), Safe Spaces, Safe Play Areas, and Child Friendly Spaces/Environments (CFS/E).

CFS give children an opportunity to escape the crowded living conditions they may be subject to during crises. As they are supervised, they also provide parents child-free time that can be necessary for fetching water, earning a living, or other activities. Given that stress levels and incidents of abuse rise during emergencies, providing children with this space and parents with time can mitigate risks. CFC can be adapted to support young children or adolescents, who are often neglected in emergencies.

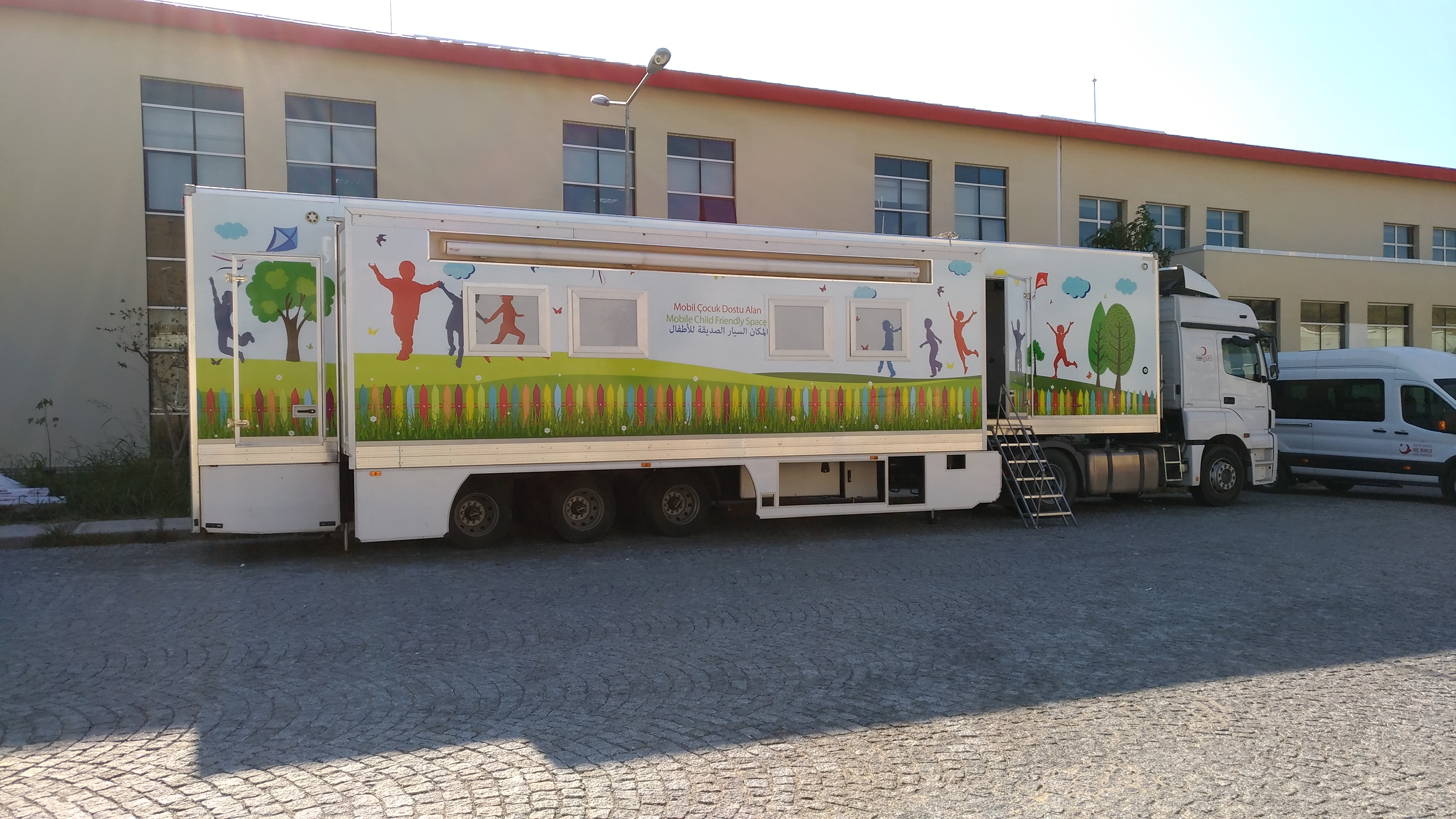
A view of Mobile Child Friendly Space operated by the Turkish Red Crescent

== Background ==
CFS have been used widely since 1999. They began as a rights-based approach developed by UNICEF to guarantee children's rights to survival, development, participation and protection, especially at times of crisis or instability. UNICEF launched the first CFC during the Kosovo crisis in Albania in April 1999. Subsequently, CFS were used in the camps for the survivors of a 1999 earthquake in Turkey. They then became a common part of the humanitarian response and have since been used in Angola, Chad, Colombia, Denmark, East Timor, El Salvador, Ethiopia, Finland, Germany, Greece, India, Iran, Iraq, Iran, Jordan, Lebanon, Liberia, Mali, Russia, Occupied Palestinian Territories, Pakistan, Paraguay, Philippines, Serbia, Somalia, Spain, Syria, Tanzania, Turkey, and Uganda, among other countries.

== Activities ==
CFC are integrated programs that provide children with access to a range of services or activities that may vary by context. These include structured recreational opportunities, play groups, peer support services, and remedial classes. Some programs involve religious and spiritual activities.

== Effectiveness ==
World Vision and Columbia University, along with Save the Children, UNICEF and others, engaged in a three-year collaborative project to document the outcomes and impacts of CFS. They found that CFS can benefit children, but the extent of their impact varies widely. In many contexts, CFS provide a foundation for positive impact on children's lives, but their impact is small. They also found that younger children tended to attend the CFS more and show greater impact. There have not been longitudinal studies to evaluate the long-term effects of CFS interventions on children.
