= Good Soil =

- Promotional Poster
- Directed by: Craig Shimahara
- Written by: Craig Shimahara
- Produced by: Shin Koyamada; Craig Shimahara; Ken Nakada
- Starring: Shin Koyamada
- Cinematography: Cory Shiozaki
- Edited by: Keita Ideno
- Distributed by: R.A.G.E. Media/Christian-Samurai.com
- Release date: 3 November 2007
- Running time: 30 minutes
- Country: United States
- Languages: English; Japanese

Good Soil (希望の大地) is a 2007 short film starring Shin Koyamada and written and directed by Craig Shimahara.

== Plot ==
Jinbei Masuda, a Japanese Christian of the samurai class, draws his strength from his faith, family, and fencing. However, he is caught up in the shogun's policy of religious persecution and must choose between his loved ones and his God.

Ships from Europe brought Christianity to the shores of Japan in 1549. For decades the seeds of faith grew under the watchful gaze of the Shogun. But the fear of foreign influence eventually gave rise to persecution. By 1624, Japanese Christians enjoyed only a few more years of peace.

== Cast ==
- Shin Koyamada as Jinbei Masuda 益田甚平
- Yoshi Ando as Michijiro
- Atsushi Hirata as Iwanaga
- Yutaka Takeuchi as Tsunoyasu
- Craig Reid as Catholic Priest
- Kazumi Zatkin as Otsu
- Maxwell Banchi as Shiro
- Christine Shimahara as Kinu
- Tex Nakamura as Daimyo
- Yuji Tone as Attendant
- Mitsuji Higashimoto as Guard No. 1
- Agata Toshiya as Guard No. 2

== See also ==
- Amakusa Shirō
- Shimabara Rebellion
- Shimabara Peninsula
