= Shin Koyamada =

Japanese actor, producer (b. 1982)

Shin Koyamada 小山田 真
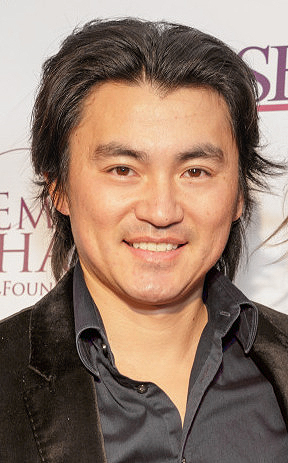
- Born: Okayama, Okayama Prefecture, Japan
- Education: University of California, Riverside (ESL); Los Angeles City College
- Occupations: Actor producer entrepreneur philanthropist
- Organization(s): Shinobi Pictures; Koyamada International Foundation; Guardian Girls International
- Spouse: Nia Lyte
- Children: 1

Japanese name
- Kanji: 小山田 真
- Hiragana: こやまだ しん
Transcriptions
- Romanization: Koyamada Shin
- Website: http://shinkoyamada.com

Shin Koyamada (小山田 真, Koyamada Shin) is a Japanese actor, producer, philanthropist, and martial artist. He is best known to the international audience for his co-starring roles in The Last Samurai (2003) as Nobutada and the Disney's Wendy Wu: Homecoming Warrior (2006) as Shen.

As producer, Koyamada develops and produces numerous content through his production company Shinobi Pictures and multimedia company Laizen Studios. In philanthropy, Koyamada serves as Board Chairs of the Koyamada International Foundation (KIF), Guardian Girls International (GGI), StarAngel International, and the Japan United States Sister City Association (JUSSCA). Koyamada holds black belts in Karate and Tae Kwon Do and won gold medals in Shaolin Kung Fu at the U.S. National Championships.

== Early life ==
Koyamada was born in Okayama, Japan, and hails from the Koyamada samurai clan. In his youth, he was an avid athlete, training in the 100m sprint, basketball as well as long-distance cycling. During his high school years in Okayama, he also excelled in gymnastics, eventually becoming the team captain and competing in local competitions. He also received basic Judo training as part of his physical education classes and graduated in 2000. At the age of 16, Koyamada began training in traditional Japanese karate, and by 18, he had earned black belts, distinguishing himself in national championships.

=== 2000: Moving to the U.S.A ===
In 2000, Koyamada moved to the United States to further his studies as an international student, enrolling in the ESL program at the University of California, Riverside. Later that year, he moved to Los Angeles alone, without speaking English, having no friends, and with no place to stay.

== Acting career ==
=== 2001-2002: Early roles ===
In 2001 and 2002, Koyamada attended Los Angeles City College, where he received general education and began taking acting lessons In 2001, Koyamada landed his first acting role in a national commercial for Apple, filmed in Philadelphia. Shortly afterward, he appeared in back-to-back commercials for JC Penney and Disneyland. The Disneyland commercial was filmed at the theme park, marking his first visit to Disneyland. In 2002, Koyamada's first acting roles in television included a brief guest appearance in Power Rangers Wild Force as an agent and a co-starring role in the award-winning short film A Ninja Pays Half My Rent as Black Ninja.

=== 2003-2005: The Last Samurai and breakthrough ===
His debut film role was co-starring with Tom Cruise in the Warner Bros. blockbuster feature film The Last Samurai (2003), as Nobutada. The film grossed $456 million at the box office and was nominated for several Academy Awards, Golden Globes, and National Board of Review Awards. In 2004, he had a guest starring role in the CBS television series Jake 2.0 as Shinji Makito.

=== 2006-2009: Disney movie, shows and Japan ===
In 2006, Koyamada co-starred with Brenda Song in the Disney Channel's Wendy Wu: Homecoming Warrior, which become one of the highest-rated Disney original television movies. It also received the highest rating in the history of Disney Channel Japan. The film also broke records in the United Kingdom and Europe, making Disney Channel the highest rated kids’ channel in Europe. In 2006, Koyamada starred in and executive produced the Japanese documentary film Wine Road of the Samurai, which was broadcast by the Tokyo Broadcasting System, Inc. nationwide in Japan.

In 2007, Koyamada starred in and produced the short film Good Soil, which is based on the historical event about Christianity in Japan. Koyamada next appeared in the 20th Century Fox drama Constellation (2007), with Zoe Saldaña, Billy Dee Williams and Hill Harper. From 2006 to 2008, Koyamada was a regular in the Disney Channel Games, appearing with Miley Cyrus, Jonas Brothers, Selena Gomez, Cole Sprouse and others.

=== 2010-2022: Starring in stage, series, movie in Japan ===
In 2010, Koyamada starred in the Japanese stage production Ai No Shizuku, which was the opening ceremony of the National Cultural Festival of Japan, the hosted by the Agency for Cultural Affairs and Okayama Prefectural Government and broadcast nationwide by the NHK in Japan. The production was attended by Then-Crown Prince of Japan Naruhito, who is now the Emperor of Japan. In 2013, he also starred in and produced the action short film Heart of the Dragon. In 2014, Koyamada starred in and produced the independent television series The Yokai King, which was entirely filmed in Okinawa, Japan, and is based on famous Japanese folklore characters. In 2022, he starred in and produced an independent American film The Yokai King: The Movie, a remake of the 2014 television series.

== Producing career ==
=== Movies, series ===
Koyamada co-founded an independent production company Shinobi Pictures in Los Angeles in 2005. In 2006, Koyamada executive produced a Japanese feature documentary film Wine Road of the Samurai, produced by the Sanyo Broadcasting and broadcast by the Japan News Network (JNN) nationwide in Japan. In 2007, Koyamada produced a 20-minute short action drama film Good Soil, written and directed by Craig Shimahara and released by R.A.G.E. Media on home video. The movie was screened at a theater in Downtown Los Angeles.

Koyamada produced a multi-part television and web series through Shinobi Pictures, comprising Spirit Fashion Show (2013), Spirit Art Show (2013), Spirit Music Show (2013), Spirit Love Show (2013) and Spirit Earth Show (2014), distributed by Spirit Show Network. In 2014, Koyamada executive produced an American television series The Yokai King, directed by Yuji Makino, in Okinawa, Japan. Later in the year, Koyamada produced a short film Heart of the Dragon, written and directed by Jeff McDonald. In 2022, Koyamada produced an award-winning American short film Shadow Glass, written and directed by Jay Lee. The movie won the Los Angeles Film Awards,

=== Comics, digital stickers, games ===
Koyamada co-founded Laizen Studios in 2019. That same year, he created and produced the American comic book series The Dreamhoppers, which was published and distributed by Laizen Studios in the United States through independent comic book stores. In 2011, Koyamada developed and produced the original digital stickers Kolala, which were published on the Line app, a platform for instant messaging and social networking. In 2013, it was announced that Koyamada joined as an executive producer for a cyberpunk RPG video game based on the historic legendary samurai Miyamoto Musashi.

=== Anime and manga ===
Koyamada co-founded several anime and manga companies, including Laizen Studios, Arabime Studios and Holy Entertainment.

== Philanthropic career ==
=== Early efforts ===
In 2004, Koyamada began his support for youth empowerment by teaching karate at a local Boys & Girls Clubs of America in Burbank. The following year, during a martial arts event at the Sportsmen's Lodge in Los Angeles, he was invited to a charity event for Kickstart Kids, a nonprofit organization founded by actor Chuck Norris with the help of former American President George H. W. Bush (1924–2018) in Houston, Texas. Koyamada begun supporting the program by participating in the annual charity event alongside Chuck Norris and President Bush, and by inspiring youth at the middle schools they worked with. In earlier years, Koyamada has supported various charitable organizations across the United States, including Japan-America Societies, National Cherry Blossom Parade, Los Angeles Mission and others.

=== Global efforts ===
Koyamada has also been involved with various global philanthropic efforts through Koyamada International Foundation (KIF), an international non-governmental organization, which was founded by Koyamada and his wife in 2008, with its mission to improve quality of people's lives by providing humanitarian aid to promote world peace and sustainable development. KIF's global programs address a broad range of topics including youth leadership, women's empowerment, cross-cultural, disaster relief, educational in emergencies, natural conservation and space. KIF is a confederation of eleven KIF national chapter members, each governed independently as a nonprofit non-governmental organization in its respective country. Additionally, it includes three affiliate members: Guardian Girls International (GGI), StarAngel International (SAI), and Anime Week International (AWI).

In early 2011, KIF has established the first National Chapter in Japan in response to the Great East Japan earthquake, tsunami, and nuclear disaster, which fundraised with fashion show. After triple disaster in Japan, he also expanded its operations and programs internationally in North America, Europe, South America, Africa, Australia, and New Zealand.

=== Gender equality ===
In 2019, Koyamada pledged to create Guardian Girls, a global program to prevent violence against women through sports and martial arts as part of the Koyamada International Foundation (KIF). This pledge was made while he was participating as a speaker at the International Conference on Population and Development (ICPD), hosted by the UNFPA and the governments of Denmark and Kenya in Nairobi, Kenya. A month later, KIF and UNFPA signed a Memorandum of Understanding (MoU) as strategic partners for the program. In 2022, KIF signed another MoU with the World Karate Federation (WKF) and launched the new Guardian Girls Karate (GGK) project in 13 countries in 2023. In 2024, Koyamada and his wife founded Guardian Girls International (GGI), an independent non-governmental organization (NGO) affiliated with KIF, to oversee all Guardian Girls programs and projects worldwide. Later that year, GGI launched the Guardian Girls Aikido (GGA) project in collaboration with the International Aikido Federation (IAF) in Latin America.

=== People to people exchanges ===
In 2017, Koyamada and his wife first participated the 60th anniversary of the San Jose-Okayama Sister City in San Jose, California to support his hometown Okayama, Japan and the friendship between the cities where he met the Chairman of the Sister Cities International (SCI). Later that year, he was elected as the first Japan-born Board of Directors of the SCI since its founding of 1956, with then-Chair Ron Nirenberg, the Mayor of San Antonio, Texas. In 2018, 2019 and 2020, Koyamada received the Chairman's Awards by the SCI.

In March 2019, Koyamada created the first-ever Japan-Texas Leadership Symposium, hosted by SCI, KIF USA, and the City of San Antonio, and supported by the Ministry of Foreign Affairs of Japan. The event aimed to foster friendships between the people of Japan and the United States through sister cities, with a focus on business, culture, and education in San Antonio, Texas. Then-Vice President Mike Pence's wife, Karen Pence, attended the event, and then-Prime Minister Shinzo Abe's wife, Akie Abe, sent a greeting letter.

In 2020, Koyamada completed his term and left the SCI Board. Later that year, and continuing into 2021, he created the Japan-United States Subnational Young Professional Forum, an online event aimed at strengthening economic ties between the next generation in Japan and the United States and promoting the Subnational diplomacy, involving participants from six different sister cities. Later in 2021, Koyamada founded the Japan United States Sister City Association (JUSSCA) in Tokyo, Japan, where he serves as chair, to foster and strengthen the existing sister city relationships between the two countries.

== Personal life ==
Koyamada is married to Carolina Manrique (known professionally as Nia Lyte), a Colombian-born producer. They have a son who was born in the United States.

=== Martial arts ===
In 1998, Koyamada began training in traditional Japanese karate under a karate instructor in Okayama, Japan, on weekends. After just a few months of training, he competed in the high school division of a national karate championship in Nagano. In 2000, before moving to Los Angeles, he earned his first-degree black belt in karate in Okayama. In high school, he took Judo as part of the school's physical education classes.

In 2000, shortly after moving to the United States, Koyamada began training in Northern Shaolin Kung Fu in Los Angeles six days a week. After six months of training, he started competing in local kung fu championships, winning first place and earning gold medals at several national martial arts championships in San Diego, San Francisco, and Las Vegas. In 2002, during the filming of The Last Samurai, Koyamada trained daily in horseback riding and Kyudo for nine months in Los Angeles, Japan, and New Zealand to eventually master Yabusame.

In 2004, Koyamada was featured on the cover of the Black Belt magazine. Later, he began training in Tae Kwon Do at a studio inside the CBS Studios lot under a traditional Korean instructor in Los Angeles, practicing every other morning. He earned his black belt in 2005. His classmate included an American bassist and composer Stanley Clarke. In 2005, Koyamada trained under Tadashi Yamashita for Iaido and Aikido at the Aikido Center of Los Angeles under a Japanese American Aikido instructor in Downtown Los Angeles.

In 2008, Koyamada began training in Kung Jung Mu Sul, the Korean Royal Court Martial Arts, under a Korean grand master in San Francisco. After a year of training, he earned a brown belt and eventually earned his first-degree black belt after two years of dedicated practice. In 2009, Koyamada was invited to perform Japanese Iaido at the first-ever Martial Arts Tour, a national martial arts festival in Nettuno, Italy, which was broadcast nationally across Italy.

In 2010, Koyamada created the first-ever United States Martial Arts Festival (USMAF), an international martial arts event hosted by KIF USA. The festival aimed to bring together various martial arts disciplines from countries where these arts originated, held at the Redondo Beach Performing Arts Center in Redondo Beach, California. The event attracted over 1,000 participants, including grandmasters, masters, instructors, students, MMA fighters, celebrities and supporters. In 2011, the event was co-hosted by the Japan Foundation and sponsored by the City of Kyoto to promote traditional Japanese culture, including flower arrangement, Japanese calligraphy, and tea ceremony.

== Awards and honors ==
=== Awards ===
- Chairman's Awards (2018, 2019, 2020) - Chairman of Sister Cities International
- Community Leadership Awards (2024) - Director of the Federal Bureau of Investigation (FBI)

=== Goodwill ambassadors ===
- Special Ambassador (2010) - President of Japan-America Society of Southern California
- International Goodwill Ambassador (2010) - Governor of Okayama Prefecture
- Kyoto Tourism Ambassador (2011) - Mayor of Kyoto
- 2020 Tokyo Olympics Karate Ambassador (2016) - President of Japan Karate Federation.
- Cultural Envoy (2022) - Foreign Minister of Mongolia
- Ambassador (2023) - President of World Karate Federation

== Filmography ==
=== Film ===
Year	Title	Role	Notes
2002	A Ninja Pays Half My Rent	Black Ninja	Short film
2003	The Last Samurai	Nobutada	
2006	Wine Road of the Samurai	Narrator	Documentary; also exec. producer
2007	Constellation	Yoshito	
2007	Good Soil	Jinbei Masuda	Short film; also producer
2022	The Yokai King	Ippei	Also producer

=== Television ===
Year	Title	Role	Notes
2002	Power Rangers Wild Force	Agent	Episode: "Identity Crisis"
2004	Jake 2.0	Shinji Makito	Episode: "Upgrade"
2006	Wendy Wu: Homecoming Warrior	Shen	TV movie
2006	Disney Channel Games 2006	Himself	TV special
2007	Disney Channel Games 2007	Himself	TV special
2008	Disney Channel Games 2008	Himself	TV special
2010	Ai No Shizuku	Seinen Makibi	TV special
2014	Heart of the Dragon	John Watanabe	Also producer
