= National Cultural Festival =

The National Cultural Festival (国民文化祭, Kokuminbunkasai) (sometimes shortened to Kokubunsai (国文祭)) is Japan’s largest cultural festival which aims to provide the Japanese public with the opportunity to present various cultural activities. There is an emphasis on activities by local performers to motivate individuals to participate in cultural activities, encourage culture, inspire the development of local culture and enrich the lives of the people. These events are hosted by the Agency for Cultural Affairs and the prefectural or municipal government, cultural organizations or other related organizations.

== Features ==
- Overall festival: includes an opening festival which indicates the direction of new trends in amateur cultural activities
- Symposiums: keynote lectures, panel discussions, and other events which explore diverse topics related to trends in Japanese culture, including amateur and regional cultural activities
- Genre-specific festivals: Performances, exhibitions, and other events are presented (with a focus on groups nominated by prefectural governments) in genres such as folk, orchestral and choral music, brass-band music, drama, literature, arts, dance, traditional Japanese music and every-day culture.
- Cooperative festivals: those complying with the objectives of the National Cultural Festival and hosted by local governments, culture-related groups, corporations and other organizations nationwide. They consist of performances, contests, festivals, exhibitions, classes, and other events.

== Host prefectures ==
- 1986 - Tokyo (1st Festival)
- 1987 - Kumamoto (2nd)
- 1988 - Hyogo (3rd)
- 1989 - Saitama (4th)
- 1990 - Ehime (5th)
- 1991 - Chiba (6th)
- 1992 - Ishikawa (7th)
- 1993 - Iwate (8th)
- 1994 - Mie (9th)
- 1995 - Tochigi (10th)
- 1996 - Toyama (11th)
- 1997 - Kagawa (12th)
- 1998 - Oita (13th)
- 1999 - Gifu (14th)
- 2000 - Hiroshima (15th)
- 2001 - Gunma (16th)
- 2002 - Tottori (17th)
- 2003 - Yamagata (18th)
- 2004 - Fukuoka (19th)
- 2005 - Fukui (20th)
- 2006 - Yamaguchi (21st)
- 2007 - Tokushima (22nd)
- 2008 - Ibaraki (23rd)
- 2009 - Shizuoka (24th)
- 2010 - Okayama (25th)
- 2024 - Ishikawa
- 2025 - Nagasaki

== See also ==
- Japanese Ministry of Education
- Agency for Cultural Affairs
- The 25th National Cultural Festival Okayama 2010
