= Oyamada clan =

Japanese samurai family group

Oyamada clan (小山田氏, Oyamada-shi) is a Japanese samurai family group. It can refer to one of five different Japanese clans, including

- One claimed descent from the Taira clan. One famous descendant was the Sengoku period samurai general Oyamada Nobushige.
- One was descended from the Usa clan.
- One claimed descent from the Northern Fujiwara by way of Uesugi Shigefusa.
- One claimed descent from the Northern Fujiwara by way of Onomiya Saneyori.
- One claimed descent from the Northern Fujiwara by way of Kikuchi Noritaka.
