= Education in emergencies and conflict areas =

Education in emergencies and conflict areas is the process of teaching and promoting quality education for children, youth, and adults in crisis-affected areas. Such emergency settings include: conflicts, pandemics and disasters caused by natural hazards. Strengthened education systems protects children and youth from attack, abuse, and exploitation, supports peace-building, and provides physical and psychological safety to children. In times of crisis, education helps build resilience and social cohesion across communities, and is fundamental to sustained recovery.

== Background ==
Emergency situations affecting education are defined as all situations in which man-made or natural disasters destroy, within a short period of time, the usual conditions of life, care and education facilities for children disrupting, denying, hindering progress or delaying the realization of the right to education. Such situations can be caused by, armed conflicts both international, including military occupation, and non-international, post-conflict situations, pandemics and all types of natural disasters.

== The right to education in emergencies ==
Education is a human right to which everyone is entitled. However, in emergencies states encounter difficulties in guaranteeing and protecting the right to education, particularly for already marginalized vulnerable groups, for example, persons with disabilities. This is due to loss of power and the lawlessness that emerges, the destruction of infrastructure or because of the redirection of resources. Emergencies increase the chances that the right to education will be violated. Therefore, it is important that international law and the international community act to minimize the harmful effects of emergency situations. In emergencies, human rights law applies across all contexts. People do not lose their human rights because of conflict, famine, or natural disasters. The right to education is non-derogable, which means states are not permitted to temporarily limit its enjoyment during a state of emergency.

Depending on the nature of the emergency, different areas of international law applies. These include: international human rights law, international humanitarian law (or the law of armed conflict), international refugee law and international criminal law. In addition ‘soft law’ such as the Safe Schools Declaration (2015) would also apply. During emergencies, a state's ability to guarantee the right to education may be compromised and other actors (the UN, NGOs, other states, etc.) are obliged to offer international assistance and cooperation.

During emergencies education is not generally seen as being immediately life-saving, yet the value of education to those affected by emergency situations should not be underestimated and is highlighted by parents and learners themselves as crucial in bringing stability, emotional and physical protection, and continuity. In the medium-term, education can help child soldiers, internally displaced persons, migrants, and refugees and all those affected by emergencies to reintegrate back into society. In the long-term, education may play a role in preventing emergencies.

=== Education for refugees, migrants and displaced persons ===
Overview of key education-related challenges in refugee contexts

According to the right to education, the same should be provided regardless of the origin, nationality, or legal status of learners. Although legal and immigration status is not explicitly listed as a prohibited ground of discrimination, several UN Human Rights treaty bodies, such as the Committee on Economic, Social and Cultural Rights (CESCR), the Committee on the Rights of the Child have affirmed that the rights under the right to education apply to everyone, including non-nationals such as refugees, asylum-seekers, stateless persons, migrant workers and victims of international trafficking, including in situations of return or deportation to the country of origin, regardless of legal status and documentation.

== Educational response in natural disasters and climate change ==
Natural disasters, such as earthquakes or typhoons, place education systems at risk of loss of life, infrastructure damage and displacement, among other threats. Ensuring that education sector plans take such risks into account can reduce potential impacts. In 2017, the United nations Office for International strategy for Disaster Reduction and the Global alliance for Disaster Risk Reduction and Resilience in the education sector launched an updated Comprehensive school safety framework stating three pillars including: safe learning facilities, school disaster management, and risk reduction and resilience education.

In Bangladesh, a component of the third primary education Development program focuses on emergencies, in recognition of the disaster risks facing the country. Its purpose is to carry out a recommendation from the 2011 local Consultative Group for Disaster emergency Response: to develop a ‘framework to guide integration of Disaster Risk Reduction and education in emergencies into sector planning and implementation’.

Many pacific island nations recognize climate change as a cause of increasing natural disaster risk and plan education structure. In 2011, the solomon Islands issued its policy statement and Guidelines for Disaster preparedness and education in emergency situations. The objective is for students to continue to access safe learning environments before, during and after an emergency, ensuring that all schools identify temporary learning and teaching spaces. It suggests that to maintain education quality, all teachers in affected areas should be trained in psychosocial strategies within two months of the disaster, and psychosocial activities should be introduced in all temporary learning spaces and schools within six weeks. The education strategic Framework 2016–2030 suggests that the curriculum should introduce ‘awareness about climate, environmental, disaster, social cohesion and social protection risk management to promote adaptation, sustainability, resilience and inclusion/equity’.

== Impact of COVID-19 on education ==
As of 20 March, more than 960 million children and youth are not attending school because of temporary or indefinite country wide school closures mandated by governments in an attempt to slow the spread of COVID-19. 105 countries have shut schools nationwide, affecting students who would normally attend pre-primary to upper-secondary classes. 15 countries have implemented localized school closures to prevent or contain COVID-19, affecting an additional 640 million school children and youth.

Even when school closures are temporary, it carries high social and economic costs. The disruptions they cause affects people across communities, but their impact is more severe for disadvantaged children and their families including:

- Interrupted learning: Schooling provides essential learning and when schools close, children and youth are deprived opportunities for growth and development. The disadvantages are disproportionate for under-privileged learners who tend to have fewer educational opportunities beyond school.
- Nutrition: Many children and youth rely on free or discounted meals provided at schools for food and healthy nutrition. When schools close, nutrition is compromised.
- Parents unprepared for distance and home schooling: When schools close parents are often asked to facilitate the learning of children at home and can struggle to perform this task. This is especially true for parents with limited education and resources.
- Unequal access to digital learning portals: Lack of access to technology or good internet connectivity is an obstacle to continued learning, especially for students from disadvantaged families.
- Gaps in childcare: In the absence of alternative options, working parents often leave children alone when schools close and this can lead to risky behaviors, including increased influence of peer pressure and substance abuse.
- High economic costs: Working parents are more likely to miss work when schools close in order to take care of their children, incurring wage loss in many instances and negatively impacting productivity.
- Unintended strain on health-care system: Women often represent a large share of health-care workers and often cannot attend work because of childcare obligations that result from school closures. This means that many medical professionals are not at the facilities where they are most needed during a health crisis.
- Increased pressure on schools and school systems that remain open: Localized school closures place burdens on schools as parents and officials redirect children to schools that are open.
- Dropout rates tend to rise: It is a challenge to ensure children and youth return and stay in school when schools reopen after closures. This is especially true of protracted closures.

In response to school closures caused by COVID-19, UNESCO recommends the use of distance learning programmes and open educational applications and platforms that schools and teachers can use to reach learners remotely and limit the disruption of education.

== Education as healing ==
Traumatic experiences can cause long-lasting physical, emotional and cognitive effects. This can be damaging when experienced during the sensitive periods of brain development. Levels of stress can disrupt the architecture and development of brain and other biological systems with negative impacts on learning, behaviour and lifelong physical and mental health.

Education can stimulate resilience, nurture learners’ social and emotional development and give children and communities hope for the future. It helps communities rebuild, by healing some of the trauma and in the long term encouraging social cohesion, reconciliation and peacebuilding. Schools can help migrant and refugee children deal with trauma through psychosocial support integrated with social and emotional learning interventions, helping to build self-confidence, resilience and emotional regulation skills, and teaching children to create relationships based on trust with others.

=== Social and emotional learning ===
Social and emotional learning programmes address trauma as part of their broader aim to improve child and youth behaviour and academic performance. Social, emotional and cognitive features of human development are connected in the brain and central to learning. Social and emotional learning programmes use active forms of learning, such as project-based learning, role play and group discussions.

=== Safe school environments ===
Education settings can be key for mitigating and reversing the effects of trauma. Safe school environments, in which students feel cared for, supported, engaged and stimulated, not only help students cope with trauma but also facilitate their learning.

The trauma of violence in schools, whether due to the direct or indirect consequences of conflict, can have a negative impact not only on enrolment, quality and achievement but also on student mental health. Education interventions to promote school safety should aim to improve school infrastructure and to protect schools and routes to school both from external threats (such as attacks or the effects of natural disasters) and internal threats (such as school-based violence or bullying).

=== Trained teachers ===
Teachers in emergencies are exposed to higher rates of trauma, whether directly or through their interactions with students. The emotional pressure of working in a traumatic setting and with traumatized individuals can have negative impacts on teachers’ mental health, which not only leads to personal and professional costs but also limit their effectiveness in assisting trauma survivors. Professional training enables teachers to better recognize and mitigate the stressful impact of responding to others’ trauma.

Teachers can be important role models for migrant and refugee learners who might not be familiar with many adults in the host country. Their potential to improve learners’ lives is higher in the context of trauma, since support from a trusted adult can counterbalance the effects of prolonged stress, especially for unaccompanied migrant and refugee minors or those who do not have parental support.

== See also ==
- Children in emergencies and conflicts
- Education for refugees, migrants and internally displaced persons
- Education in Syria

== Sources ==
This article incorporates text from a free content work. Licensed under CC BY-SA 3.0 IGO. Text taken from Right to education handbook, UNESCO, UNESCO. UNESCO.

This article incorporates text from a free content work. Licensed under CC BY-SA 3.0 IGO. Text taken from Global education monitoring report, 2019: Migration, displacement and education: building bridges, not walls, UNESCO, UNESCO. UNESCO.
