= Children in the Israeli–Palestinian conflict =

Impact of the Israeli–Palestinian conflict on minors

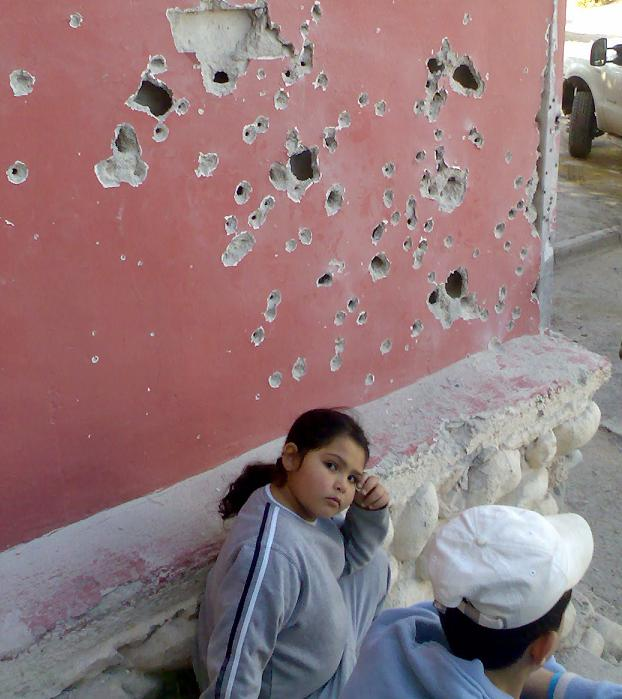
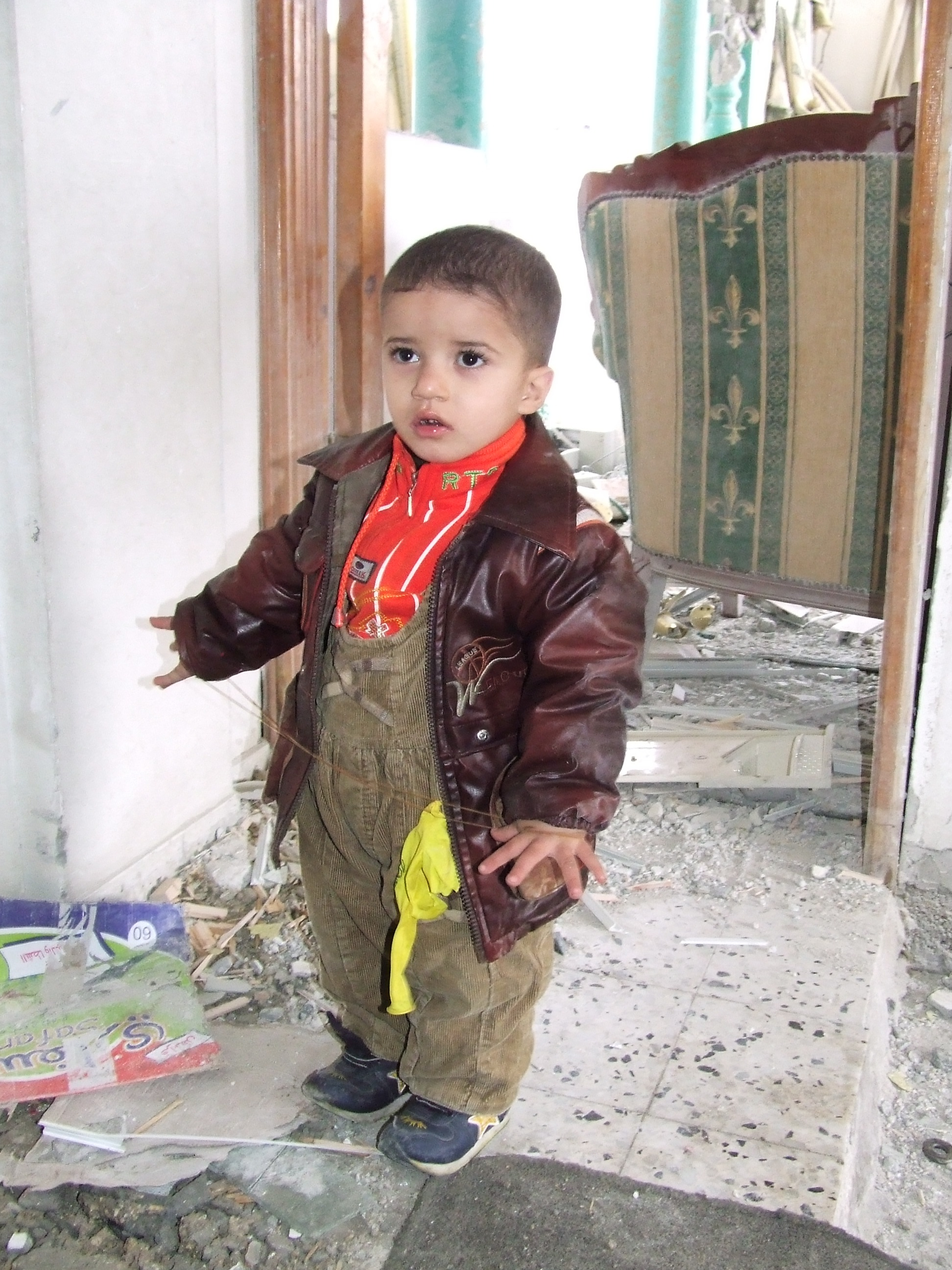
An Israeli girl (left) and a Palestinian boy (right) by houses damaged during the Gaza War (2008–2009)

Children and children's rights have long been a focal point of the ongoing Israeli–Palestinian conflict, dating as early as the 1929 Hebron massacre and the 1948 Deir Yassin massacre, both of which claimed the lives of children, precipitating a long conflict that has often led to the displacement, injury, and death of youths. Youth exposure to hostilities increased notably during the First and Second Intifada, where harsh responses from Israeli forces towards Palestinian adolescents and children protesting the Israeli occupation led to the arrest and detention of many Palestinian youth, in addition to other human rights abuses.

Children have been regular victims and, at times, used as perpetrators of violence in the conflict, including being used as suicide bombers. Israeli and Palestinian children have suffered from attacks, including bombings and shootings, often targeting or involving schools and other youth spaces. Reports indicate that such violence has had severe psychological impacts on children, including trauma and PTSD. International organizations, including the UN and Human Rights Watch, have expressed grave concern about the treatment of children in the conflict and have called for both sides to adhere to international conventions on the rights of children. In fact, during the Gaza war, the United Nations added the Israeli Defense Forces to a list of offenders who fail to protect children. According to B'tselem's calculations, as of 2021, some 2,171 Palestinian children had been killed in the last two decades by Israeli forces, and 139 Israeli children have been killed by Palestinian forces. Save the Children has estimated that up to 21,000 children have gone missing from the Gaza Strip between October 2023 to June 2024.

Efforts have been made to address the conflict's impact on children, with various peace projects involving youth from both sides. These initiatives aim to foster understanding, reconciliation, and dialogue, emphasizing education and shared experiences. Despite these efforts, the ongoing conflict continues to significantly affect the lives of children in both Israeli and Palestinian societies.

== History ==
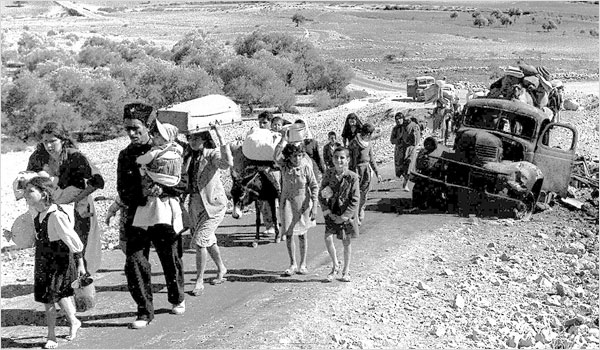
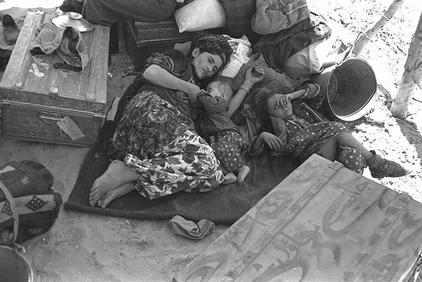
Palestinian families fleeing Galilee in late 1948 (left) and displaced Iraqi Jewish children in 1951 (right)
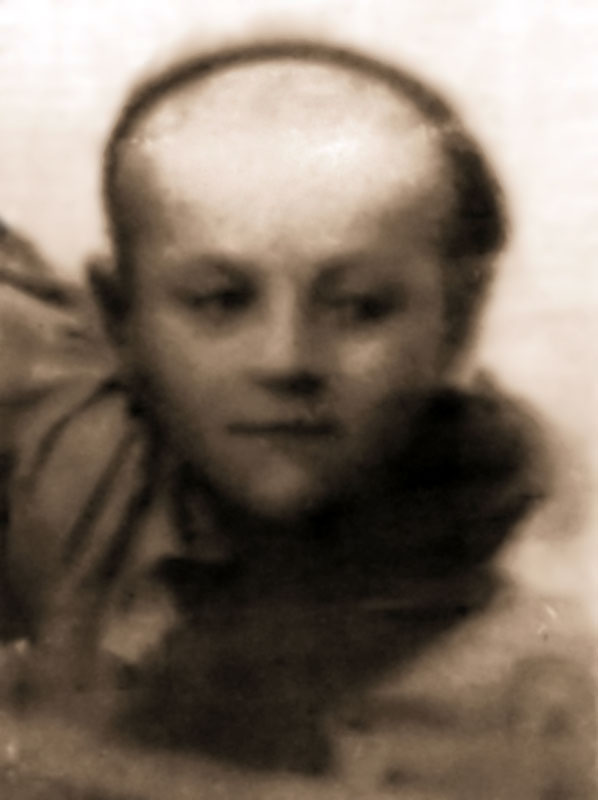
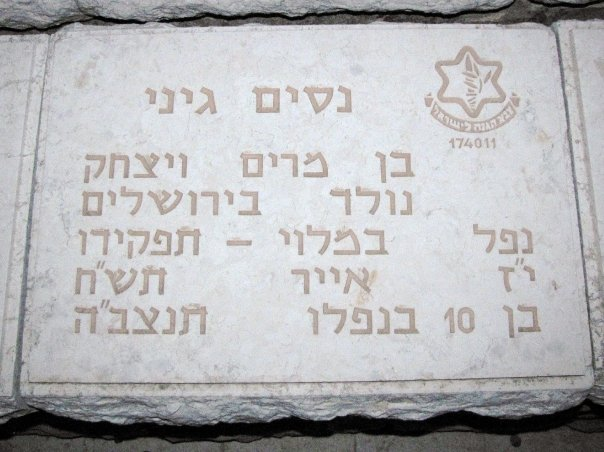
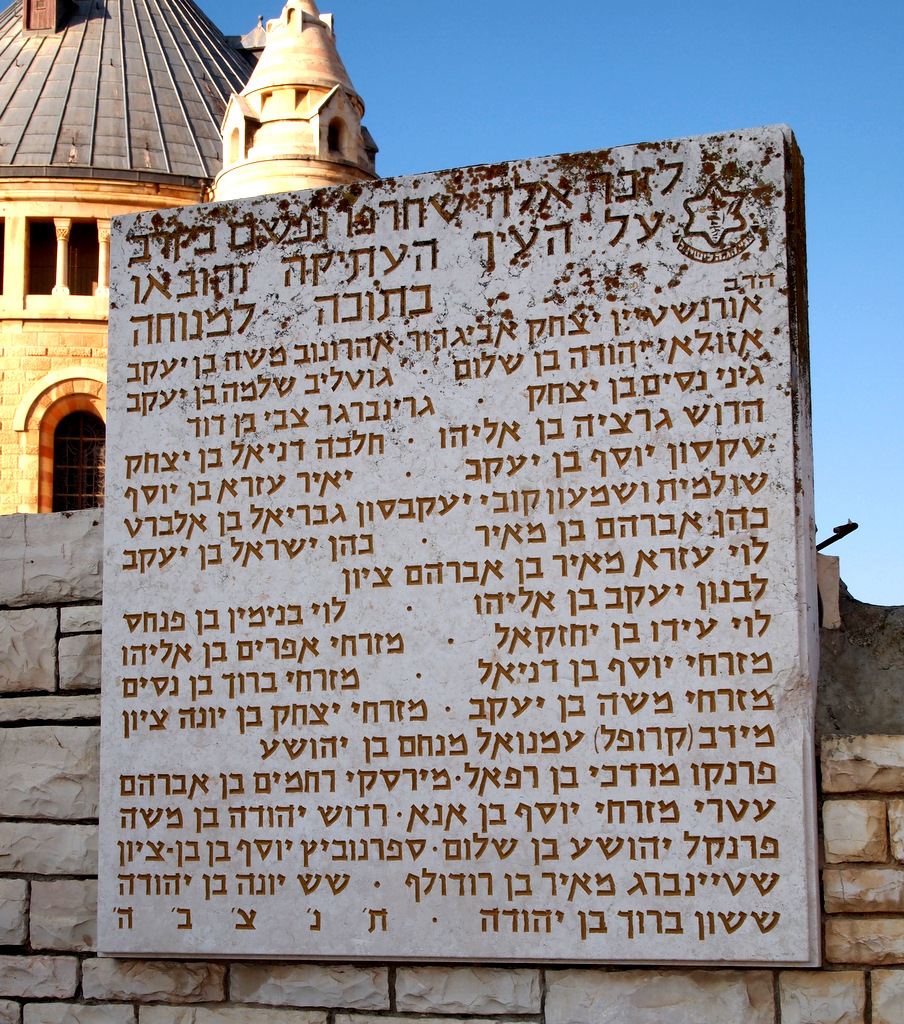
Nissim Gini (1938‑1948): his school photo, his military grave marker, and an IDF monument to Nissim and others who lost their lives in the battle for the Jewish Quarter

Youth have been affected by military action since before the creation of Israel. The 1929 Hebron massacre claimed the lives of 24 school-aged Yeshiva students and children under 5. In early April 1948, adolescent militants from the Irgun and Lehi terror groups participated in an indiscriminate massacre of no less than 107 Palestinian residents of the village of Deir Yassin including women and children. Later that month, 15-year-old Haganah fighter Yaakov Fadida was killed in combat at the battle for Tiberias.

The youngest fallen "soldier" commemorated by the Israel Defense Forces (IDF) is Nissim Gini (Hebrew: נסים גיני, 1938-1948). He was 9 or 10 years old. He was killed in the battle for the Jewish Quarter of the Old City, in present-day East Jerusalem. During the battle, Nissim was a lookout and courier. An account of the battle written by a 20-year-old Israeli soldier accused the community's adults of "extraordinary cowardice" while praising the children for working as runners between positions. Children from the Jewish Quarter also assisted in the battle by helping to construct improvised explosive devices designed by the Irgun. After the area was surrendered to Jordanian forces Nissim and 7 other combatants were buried in a mass grave by a local Palestinian man. Later, in 1967, after the Six-Day War, the Palestinian man who buried the fallen soldiers showed Israelis where to find the mass grave. Nissim's body was identified by the presence of his baby teeth. Nissim and the 7 older soldiers were reburied together at the Mount of Olives.

Since the Six-Day War, when the West Bank and the Gaza Strip fell under Israeli military occupation, according to Anton Shammas, the idea of 'childhood' was abolished and dropped from Israeli military declarations, so that if a 10-year-old happened to be shot, he was referred to as 'a young man of ten'. With the outbreak of the First Intifada (1987–1993), stone-throwing was defined as a felony, children began to be arrested with bail set at US$400, and if this was not paid, they could be held in administrative detention for 1 year. The continued Israeli occupation and the stalled Israeli–Palestinian peace process has led to Palestinian protests and political violence, building up to mass protests during the First Intifada. Many youth were involved in nonviolent demonstrations, sit-ins, walk-outs, boycotts, civil disobedience and strikes organized by popular committees. There also was rioting, grenade throwing, and suicide bombings.

J. Kuttab refers to the First Intifada as the "children's revolt" because youth "possessed a new spirit that challenged the occupation" and inspired even adults to action. James L. Gelvin has written that the "paradigmatic symbol" of the First Intifada was "unarmed Palestinian children throwing stones at Israeli tanks." Approximately 90 percent of young males and 80 percent of young females engaged in some form of activism. The much more violent Second Intifada (2000–2005) was led by adults in the Palestine Liberation Organization following the collapse of the 1993 Oslo Accords.

A 2007 survey showed that 17 percent of the Palestinian population is made up of children under the age of five, and 46 percent under 15. In 2012, it was estimated that the densely populated Gaza Strip had a population of 1.7 million, over 800,000 of whom are children.

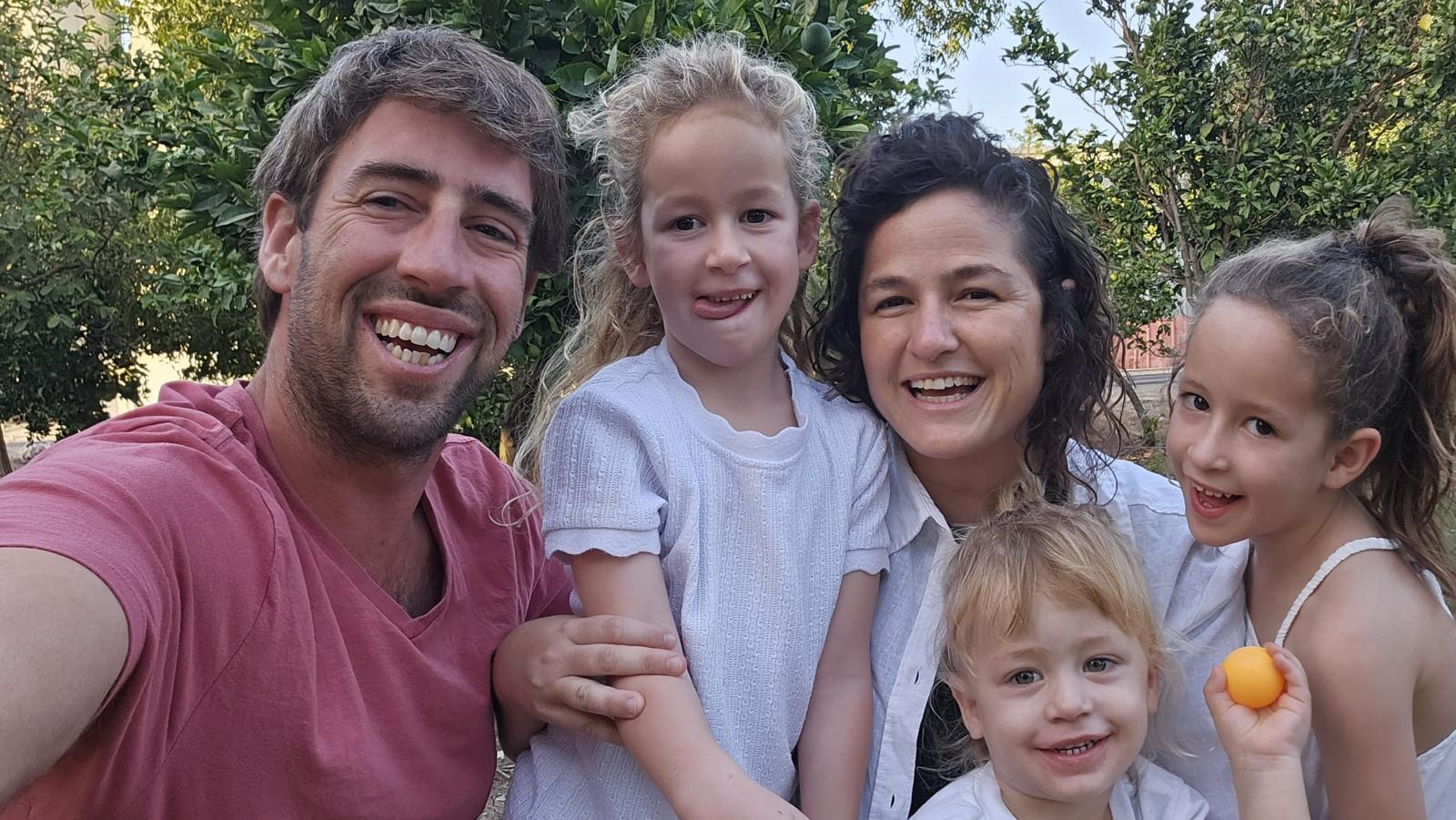
Siman-Tov family, who were murdered on 7 October 2023, in Nir Oz attack.

Rock-throwing and firebomb attacks by Palestinians on Israeli residents have been described as regular occurrences in the West Bank, and in many cases they directly affect children. Israelis have recounted incidents in which Palestinians targeted children on school buses, and report that in Hebron they "routinely throw stones at children in the playground." According to the IDF, Arab snipers have fired at cars containing children, and rockets from Gaza have landed in locations that are typically frequented by large numbers of children.

A UN draft report on children in armed conflict, scheduled for publication in mid-June 2015 and prepared by Leila Zerrougui for the Secretary-General of the United Nations, reportedly recommended adding both Israel and Hamas to the "List of Shame" due to repeated violations of children's rights. Human Rights Watch wrote to Ban Ki-Moon on 27 April requesting that the names of Israel and Hamas remain on the list in the context of reports that Israel had been lobbying to have its name removed. Israel denies it has lobbied the UN over this. Inclusion in the list requires that a pattern of multiple instances of repeated abuses of children be evidenced. Human Rights Watch cited in its 2014 report on events in the Israeli–Palestinian conflict over the preceding year nearly a dozen cases of Palestinian children killed by Israeli security forces and over 1,200 Palestinian children injured. In addition, 41 incidents in which school facilities were damaged, classes interrupted, and students injured by IDF forces were registered. Palestinian armed groups, the reports also noted, had launched in the same period some 63 rockets into Israel from Gaza, resulting in disruptions to the schooling of over 12,000 Israeli children.

During the Gaza war, according to the Israeli government, up to 40 of the hostages taken by Hamas were children. Initial reports of 40 babies decapitated and one cooked in an oven were later proven to be false.

== Casualty and fatalities ==
Below is a summary of tables of child fatalities from 1987 to 2022 presented by B'Tselem. It provides an overview of killings of Israeli children by Palestinian militants and of Palestinian children, largely by Israeli security forces. Per the below, the Israeli government disputes some of these numbers, especially regarding the Gaza War.

Summary of B'Tselem tables of child fatalities in Israel, West Bank & Gaza, 1987–2022
Date range	Period	Fatalities			Notes	Reference
Date range	Period	Israelis	Palestinians	Total	Notes	Reference
9 December 1987 – 28 September 2000	From the start of the First Intifada to the start of the Second Intifada	18	281	299	under the-age-of 17	
29 September 2000 – 26 December 2008	From the start of the Second Intifada to the start of the 2008 Gaza War	123	961	1084		
27 December 2008 – 18 January 2009	During the 2008–2009 Gaza War	0	345	345		
19 January 2009 – 31 October 2012	From the end of the 2008–2009 Gaza War	6	37	43		
1 November 2012 – 18 January 2022	Ongoing	10	840	850		
Total fatalities		157	2464	2621		

The First Intifada of mass protests and rioting by Palestinians in the occupied West Bank, East Jerusalem and Gaza started in 1987, and children frequently participated. In an article in the London Review of Books, American professors John Mearsheimer and Stephen Walt claimed that the Israel Defense Forces ("IDF") encouraged troops to break protesters' bones. The Swedish branch of Save the Children estimated that during the first year of the intifada, between 23,600 and 29,900 children required medical treatment for such beating, tear gas, and gunfire injuries and that nearly a third were under the age of ten. The Israel Ministry of Foreign Affairs lists 24 Israeli child fatalities between 1993 and 1999.

As the B'Tselem summaries show, from the outbreak of the Second Intifada starting in 2000 through the 2008–2009 Gaza War to September 2012, there were a greater number of child fatalities. A study by the International Institute for Counter-Terrorism covering September 2001 to January 2005 found that 46 Israelis and 88 Palestinians were below the age of 12 at the time of their deaths. The youngest victim of violence during the Second Intifada was an Israeli infant who was nine hours old at the time of his death. During the 2004–2009 period, there were reports of 30 or more Palestinian children and infants dying, including as a result of miscarriage, at Israeli checkpoints where they were held for long periods of time and denied medical care. Additionally, suicide bombings and other attacks have caused Israeli women to suffer miscarriages, and numerous pregnant women have been killed. Casualties after the three-week Gaza War during the winter of 2008–2009 were disputed. B'Tselem put out a report stating that 320 Palestinian minors under the age of 18 who did not take part in hostilities had been killed by Israeli forces. It was unknown if six other dead children took part, but 19 children between the ages of 16 and 18 who did so also were killed. Defence for Children International reported that 352 children had died as a direct result of Israeli military action. The Palestinian Centre for Human Rights found that 318 Palestinian children had been killed. Al Mezan Center for Human Rights found that 355 Gazan children were killed by Israeli forces. According to Amnesty International, the Palestinian fatalities included "some 300" children. The Israeli military later released its own figures, stating only 89 children under the age of 16 died. According to Elihu D. Richter and Yael Stein of Hebrew University, B'Tselem data showed that the overwhelming majority of Palestinian child deaths were male teenagers, suggesting many could have had some role in combat or support for combat.

Studies conducted by Israel's International Institute for Counter-Terrorism indicate that 96 percent of Palestinian fatalities during the Second Intifada were male and that the vast majority of child casualties were teenagers. Israeli fatalities do not show any great inclination in regard to gender or age.

The United Nations Office for the Coordination of Humanitarian Affairs reported that during the 2012 Gaza War, 30 Palestinian children were killed.

=== Israeli children ===
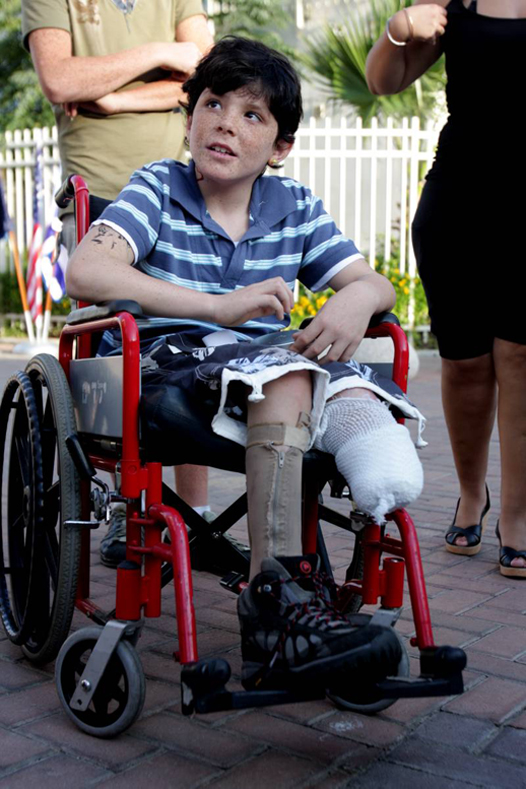
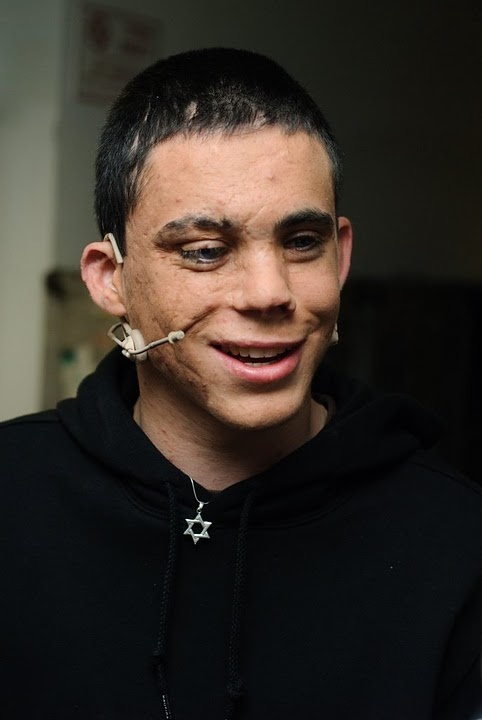
9-year-old Israeli boy Osher Twito lost his leg after a Palestinian Qassam rocket exploded next to him in the city of Sderot (left) and Oren Almog, who was ten years old at time of the Maxim restaurant suicide bombing, was blinded by the blast, lost two of his grandparents, his father, his brother and his cousin.

Palestinian suicide attacks, mainly directed at Israeli civilians, began in the 1990s and peaked during the Second Intifada (2000–2005). According to Amnesty International, between 2000 and 2004, "more than 100 Israeli children... [were] killed and hundreds of others injured in suicide bombings, shootings and other attacks carried out by Palestinian armed groups in Israel and in the Occupied Territories."

Some children were killed in shootings and attacks on cars and buses. In addition, several rapes, kidnappings, and individual murders of Israeli children and teenagers have occurred. Other Israeli children were killed in home invasions, some of them in their own beds or their parents' beds.

Examples include:

- In 2001, a Palestinian sniper opened fire on the Avraham Avino settlement in Hebron from the Palestinian-controlled Abu Sneineh neighborhood. Ten- month-old Shalhevet Pass was shot in the head and killed while sitting in her stroller; her father was wounded.
- The Sbarro restaurant suicide bombing in August 2001 killed 15 Israelis, among them 7 children and a pregnant woman.
- The Yeshivat Beit Yisrael bombing on 2 March 2002, targeting a group of women and children next to a synagogue, resulted in the deaths of seven children and four adults. Eight of the dead came from the same family.
- The 2004 Murder of Tali Hatuel and her four daughters, in which Palestinian militants killed Tali Hatuel, who was eight months pregnant, along with her four daughters: Hila (11), Hadar (9), Roni (7) and Merav (2). After shooting at the vehicle in which Hatuel was driving with her daughters, witnesses said the militants approached the vehicle and shot the occupants repeatedly at close range. An alliance of Islamic Jihad and the Popular Resistance Committees claimed responsibility for the attack.

Israel's Ministry of Foreign Affairs reports that 8,341 Israelis were injured as a direct result of the conflict between 2001 and 2007 but does not specify how many were minors. Frequent rocket fire has also caused many injuries in the post-Intifada period. Permanent disability among children has resulted, including blindness, paralysis, brain damage, and loss of limbs. A 2003 study by Schneider Children's Medical Center of Israel concluded, "Analysis of the injuries sustained by the 160 children hospitalized after these events indicates that most were caused by blasts and penetration by foreign objects. Sixty-five percent of the children had multiple injuries, and the proportion of critical to fatal injuries was high (18%)."

The rate of Israeli casualties in total declined following the construction of the West Bank Barrier; suicide bombing rates fell as potential bombers were thwarted before entering Israeli territory.

=== Palestinian children ===
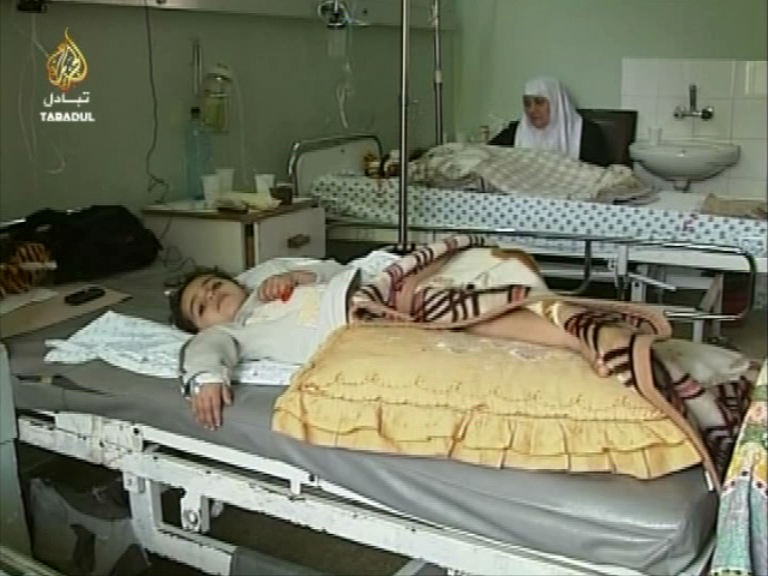
Palestinian girl hospitalized during the Gaza War

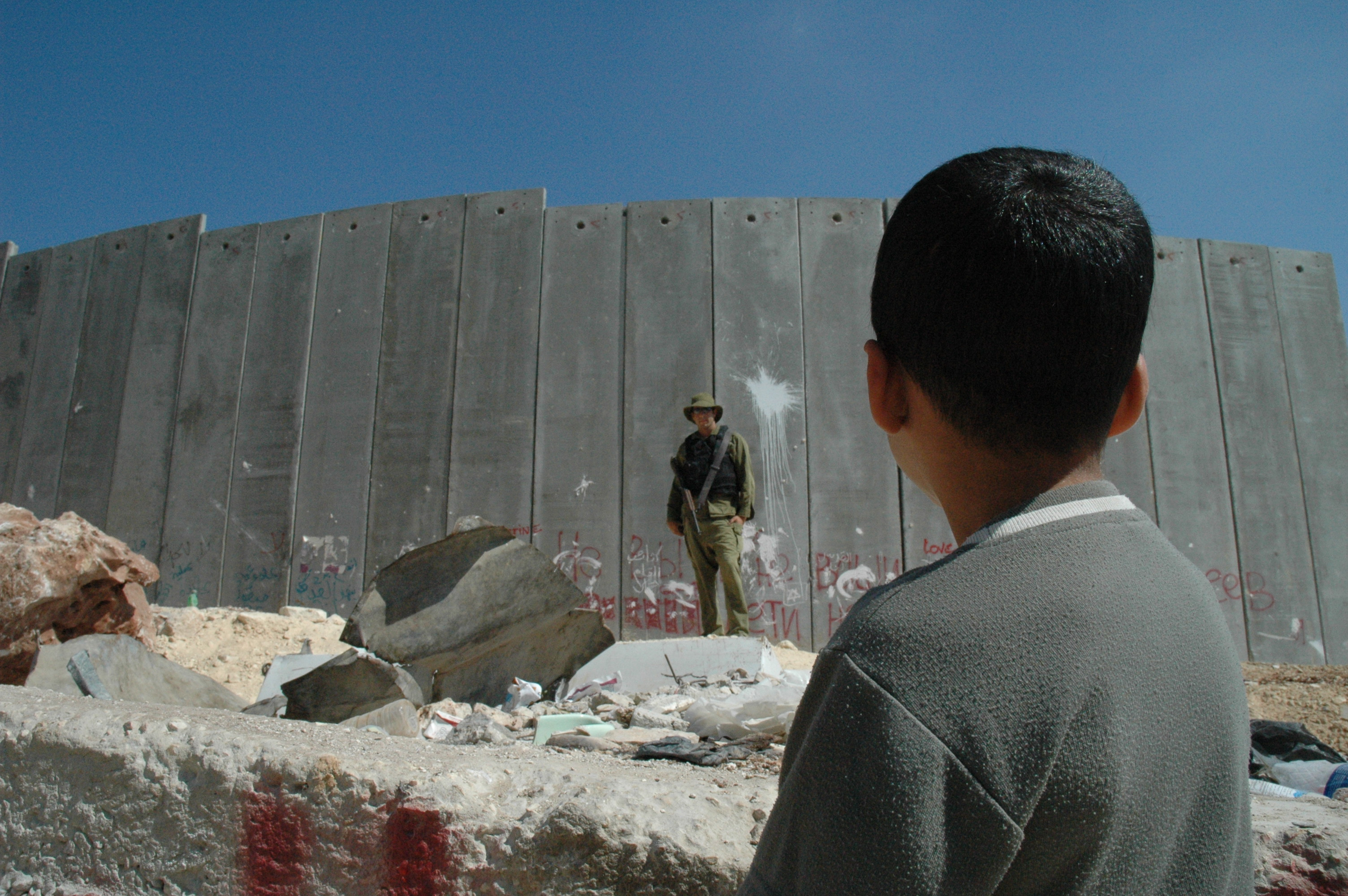
A boy looking at an Israeli soldier in front of the West Bank barrier

The first recorded incident of Israel Defense Forces killing Palestinian children was in November 1950 when three Palestinian children from the village of Yalo, aged 8, 10 and 12, were shot near Dayr Ayyub in the Latrun salient. According to adult witnesses, "only one man fired at them with a stun-gun but none of the detachment attempted to interfere." In February 1953, one of five Arab shepherds shot in al-Burj was 13 years old. During the 1952 Beit Jala raid, four children ranging in age from 6 to 14 were killed by machine gun fire.

According to Amira Hass, 54 minors were brought to UNRWA clinics with head wounds from August 1989 to August 1993. The Association of Israeli and Palestinian Physicians for Human Rights (PHR-Israel) estimates that a child under the age of six was shot in the head every two weeks during the First Intifada.

Nuphar Ishay-Krien, a social welfare officer during the First Intifada, worked with two mechanized infantry companies in the southern Gaza Strip, collecting testimony from soldiers. In one instance, a soldier stated that during a patrol, his commander grabbed a 4-year-old boy, broke his arm and leg, and stepped on his stomach multiple times. When asked why, the commander replied, "These kids need to be killed from the day they are born. When a commander does that, it becomes legit."

According to the Defence for Children International (DCI), of the "595 children killed [29 September 2000 to 30 June 2004] during the Second Intifada, 383, or 64.4%, died as a result of Israeli air and ground attacks, during assassination attempts, or when Israeli soldiers opened fire randomly" and "212 children, or 35.6%, died as a result of injuries sustained during clashes with Israeli military forces." The DCI estimates that from 1 January 2001 until 1 May 2003, at least 4,816 Palestinian children were injured, with the majority of injuries resulting from Israeli army activity while the children were going about their normal activities.

Amnesty International accused Israeli forces of inadequately investigating killings of children during the Second Intifada, while also condemning the killings of Israeli children by suicide bombings and other attacks by Palestinians.

During the Gaza War of 2008-2009, a three-week armed conflict in the Gaza Strip between Israel and Palestinian militants, an "unprecedented" number of children were killed or injured, according to the Palestinian Centre for Human Rights which listed 313 killed. The Israel Defense Forces said that 89 "non-combatants" under the age of 16 died. B'Tselem reported that 318 minors below the age of 18 were killed. B'Tselem's numbers were disputed. When the United Nations attempted an investigation of high civilian deaths as a possible war crime, Israelis refused to cooperate.

During the November 2012 Gaza War, 30 children reportedly were killed.

Other examples of casualties include:

- Killing of 12-year-old Muhammad al-Durrah in September 2000 as his father tried to shield him from bullets became a defining image of the Second Intifada, and was compared to other iconic images of children under attack, such as the boy in the Warsaw ghetto (1943).
- In November 2000, 14-year-old Faris Odeh was shot and killed while clashing with Israeli troops at the Karni crossing.
- In 2001, an 11-year-old boy, Khalil al-Mughrabi, was killed by tank fire, and two others were injured. Al-Mughrabi had been playing football in a field a half-mile away.
- During the 2007 assassination of Salah Shahade, a member of Hamas, several civilians were killed, including eight children.
- In December 2008, two Palestinian school girls were killed in Gaza when a Qassam rocket launched by militants fell short of its Israeli target and into a house.

During the first weeks of the ongoing Gaza War, which began in October 2023, a Palestinian NGO estimated that the Israeli bombings of Gaza killed one child every 15 minutes, with more than 100 children dying each day.

As of 5 April 2024, approximately 14,500 Palestinian children had been killed in the Gaza war. In that period, military operations by Israel have also surged in the occupied West Bank, making last year the deadliest year on record for children there. A total of 124 children were killed in 2023, according to UNICEF - 85 of whom were reported killed after 7 October. So far in 2024, 36 Palestinian children have been killed in the territory by Israeli settlers or the military.

As of September 2025, reports indicate that at least 19,000 children have been killed and about 42,000 injured in the Gaza War.

=== Foreign children ===
- Aleksei Lupalu, 16, of Ukraine was killed in the Dolphinarium discotheque suicide bombing on 2 June 2001, along with 20 other civilians. Hamas claimed responsibility.
- Shmuel Taubenfeld, 3 months, of New Square, New York, was killed in the Shmuel HaNavi bus bombing on 19 August 2003 along with 22 other civilians, of whom 2 were foreign citizens. Over 130 were injured, and seven fatalities were children. Both Hamas and Islamic Jihad claimed responsibility.
- Daniel Wultz, aged 16, of Weston, Florida, USA, was killed in the 2006 Tel Aviv shawarma restaurant bombing. 10 other civilians were killed, of whom seven were Israeli and three were from other countries, and over 70 were injured. Islamic Jihad claimed responsibility.
- In March 2012, a French Muslim attacked the Ozar Hatorah Jewish day school, later stating he did it to avenge Palestinians. He shot and killed a Rabbi who taught there and his two sons, Aryeh, aged 6, and Gabriel, aged 3, as well as 8-year-old Miriam Monsonego and severely injured 17-year-old Bryan Bijaoui.

== Palestinian attacks targeting children ==
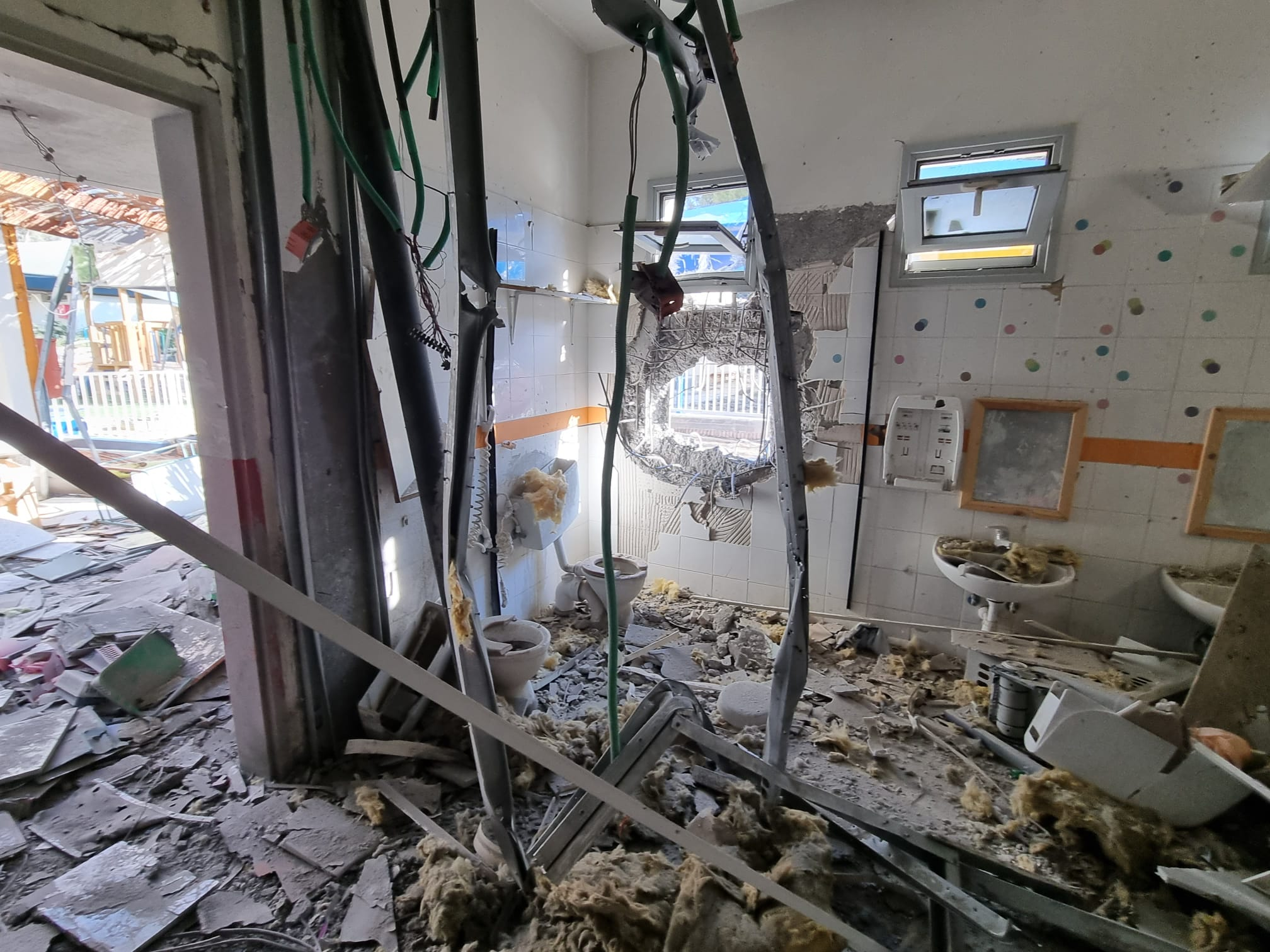
A destroyed kindergarten following the Be'eri massacre

Though Israeli children were killed in the conflict during the decades prior, the first acts of Palestinian violence specifically targeting large numbers of Israeli children were committed in the 1970s.

The Avivim school bus bombing was a terrorist attack on an Israeli school bus on 22 May 1970 in which 12 Israeli civilians were killed, nine of them children, and 25 were wounded. The attack took place on the road to Moshav Avivim, near Israel's border with Lebanon. Two bazooka shells were fired at the bus. The attack was one of the first carried out by the PFLP-GC.

The Ma'alot massacre in May 1974 involved a two-day hostage-taking of 115 people which ended in the deaths of over 25 hostages. It began when three armed members of the Democratic Front for the Liberation of Palestine (DFLP) entered the Netiv Meir Elementary School, where they took more than 115 people (including 105 children) hostage on 15 May 1974, in Ma'a lot. The hostage-takers soon issued demands for the release of 23 Palestinian militants from Israeli prisons, or else they would kill the students. On the second day of the standoff, a unit of the Golani Brigade stormed the building. During the takeover, the hostage-takers killed the children with grenades and automatic weapons. Ultimately, 25 hostages, including 22 children, were killed and 68 more were injured.

The Dolphinarium discotheque suicide bombing was a terrorist attack by on 1 June 2001 in which a suicide bomber Saeed Hotari, linked to the Palestinian group Hamas, blew himself up outside a discotheque on a beachfront in Tel Aviv, Israel, killing 21 Israeli teenagers and injuring 132.

The 2008 Jerusalem yeshiva attack, also called the Mercaz HaRav shooting, was an attack that occurred on 6 March 2008, in which a lone Palestinian gunman shot multiple students at the Mercaz HaRav yeshiva, a school in Jerusalem. Eight students and the perpetrator were killed. Eleven more were wounded, five of them placed in serious to critical condition.

Other terrorist attacks targeting children included the 2011 Itamar attack in which six children and their parents were murdered in their beds, including a three-month-old infant, and the 2011 Sha'ar HaNegev school bus attack in which Hamas militants in the Gaza Strip fired a Kornet laser-guided anti-tank missile over the border at an Israeli school bus, killing one child.

During Hamas's surprise attack on Israel in 2023, Hamas subsequently kidnapped at least 30 children. Following the events and Israeli military response, false allegations, encouraged by social media attempted to deny the deaths of both Israeli and Palestinian children.

== Treatment of Palestinian children by the IDF ==
It has been observed that the reaction of Israeli police and the IDF, the Israel Defense Forces, against Palestinian violence is so strong that it "practically eliminates the chances of effective training directed at the protection of children." Many children are raised in refugee camps, and their situation has been described by Daoud Kuttub in the following way:

"Unlike children in refugee camps elsewhere, children born in refugee camps under occupation drink their mothers' milk while their camp is under curfew; they wake up in the middle of the night to the sound of rubber bullets and rumors of a possible settler attack. As they grow up, they quickly learn the political lesson of the occupation. Soldiers, batons, tear gas, rubber bullets, arrests, torture, curfews, closure of camp entrances, administrative detention, and town arrests are all prominent entries in the refugee camps' daily dictionary."

=== Violence against children ===
Breakdown of Palestinian deaths in the Gaza war by age and gender as of November 2023 (analysis by professors Michael Spagat and Daniel Silverman)
1. Men and boys over 14 (35.3%)
2. Women and girls over 14 (24.1%)
3. Children under 14 (33.8%)
4. Elderly, above 60 (6.80%)

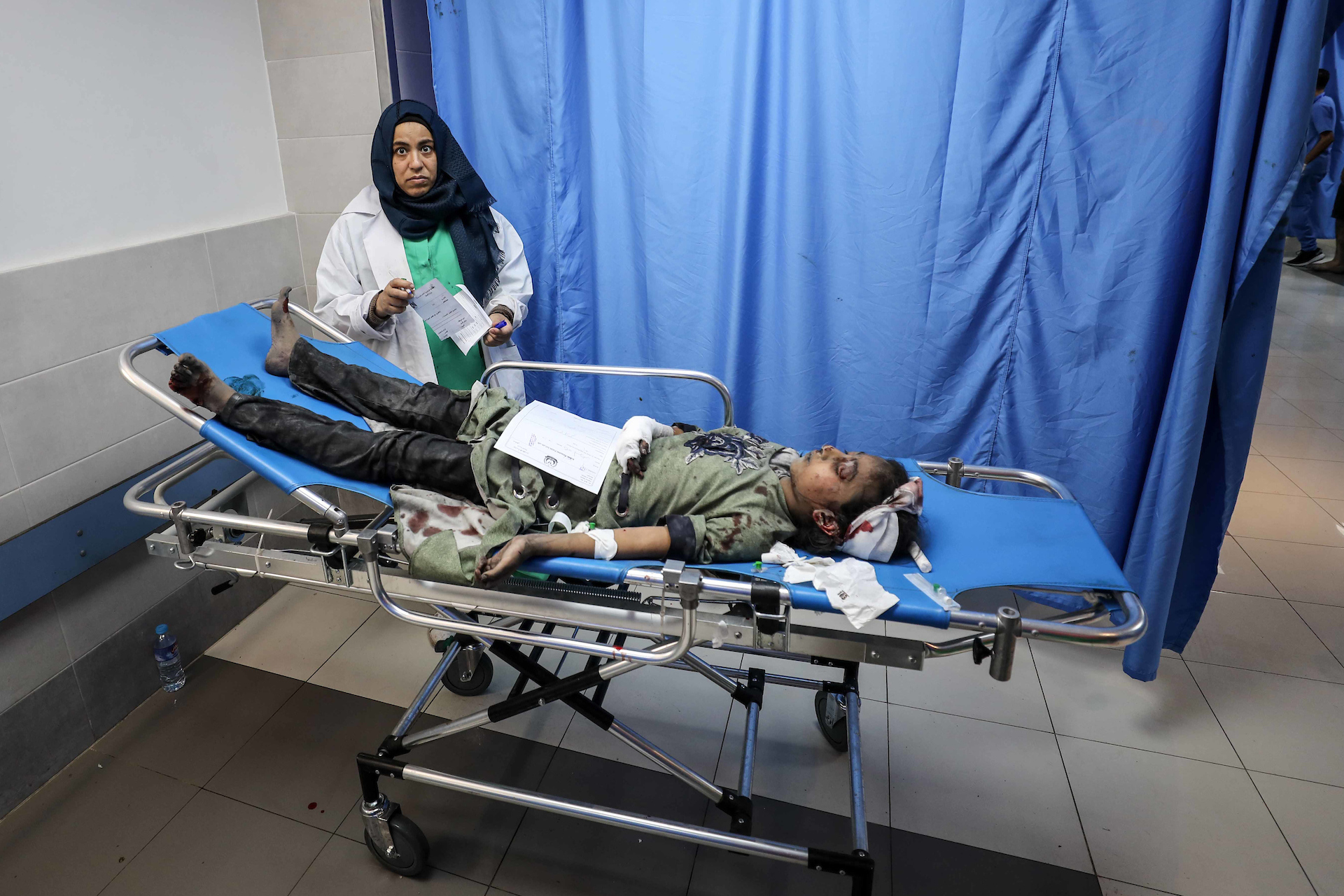
Wounded child at al-Shifa Hospital, October 2023

Each year, approximately 700 Palestinian children aged 12 to 17, the great majority of them boys, are arrested, interrogated and detained by the Israeli army, police and security agents.

Between the years 2003 and 2013, an estimated 7,000 children were detained, interrogated, prosecuted and/or imprisoned within the Israeli military justice system – an average of two children each day. Israel, after it emerged that even 12-year-old children were prosecuted in adult military courts, instituted in September 2009 a juvenile military court, the only one known to exist in the world, which, however, uses the same staff and rooms as the military courts where Palestinian adults are put on trial. Two years later (27 September 2011), Military Order 1676 stipulated that only youths 18 and over could be tried in adult military courts. However, the sentencing protocols applied to the 16–17 year old bracket remain those applied to adults. Most prosecutions of teenagers concern stone-throwing, which is an offence under Section 212 of Military Order 1651, and carries a penalty of up to 10 years imprisonment, theoretically applicable to children between 14 and 15. Conviction for throwing anything at a moving vehicle with the intent to harm carries a maximum penalty of 20 years.

The analysis of cases monitored by UNICEF identified examples of practices that amount to cruel, inhuman, or degrading treatment or punishment according to the Convention on the Rights of the Child (ratified by Israel in 1991 and the PA in 1995) and the Convention against Torture. It is common for many children caught up in the system to be aggressively woken in the middle of the night by many armed soldiers and, tied and blindfolded, transported to Israeli settlements or official interrogation centers. Few children are informed of their rights to legal counsel or their right to avoid self-incrimination. Confessions from children are extracted by a mixture of sleep deprivation, threats–of death threats against them or their families, sexual assault and solitary confinement–and physical violence. Confessions to be signed are often written in Hebrew, which most Palestinian children do not know. Once the interrogation is finished, the children, in leg chains, shackles and prison uniforms, are taken before a military court where their confessions, extorted under duress, form the primary evidence for the prosecution. Sentences are served in three prisons, two of which are inside Israel, and critics argue that their incarceration in Israel violates Article 76 of the Geneva Convention, which states that "protected persons accused of offences shall be detained in the occupied country, and if convicted they shall serve their sentences therein."

According to John Dugard, the UN Special Rapporteur, regarding the early years of the Al-Aqsa Intifada (2000–2002), most child victims were not participating in demonstrations when they were killed by tank shelling, artillery fire and helicopter gunships. Since the Second Intifada, UNICEF (The United Nations Children's Fund), Amnesty International, B'Tselem and individuals such as the British writer Derek Summerfield, have called for Israel to protect children from violence in accordance with the Geneva Conventions. The European Union has linked the suspension of Israel/Europe trade agreement talks to human rights issues, especially regarding children.

In 2012, Breaking the Silence, an organization founded by former Israeli soldiers whose purpose is to expose abuses committed by the Israel Defense Forces, released a booklet of witness reports written by more than 30 former Israeli soldiers. These reports document Palestinian children being beaten, intimidated, humiliated, verbally abused and injured by Israeli soldiers. Eran Efrati, a former IDF commander on the West Bank, has said that ill-treatment of arrested children is routine. He himself admits to having arrested children aged 11 and over as though they were adults, with handcuffs and blindfolds:

"When the kid is sitting there in the base, I didn't do it, but nobody is thinking of him as a kid, you know—if there is someone blindfolded and handcuffed, he's probably done something really bad. It's OK to slap him, it's OK to spit on him, it's OK to kick him sometimes. It doesn't really matter."

700 of the 9,000 Palestinians arrested in 2013 were children. Between 2014 and 2015, the military prosecuted indictments against 1,046 Palestinian minors. The non-governmental organization, Euro-Mediterranean Human Rights Monitor, accused the Israeli forces of orchestrating "their actions" to "humiliate and terrorize Palestinian children."

==== Gaza war ====
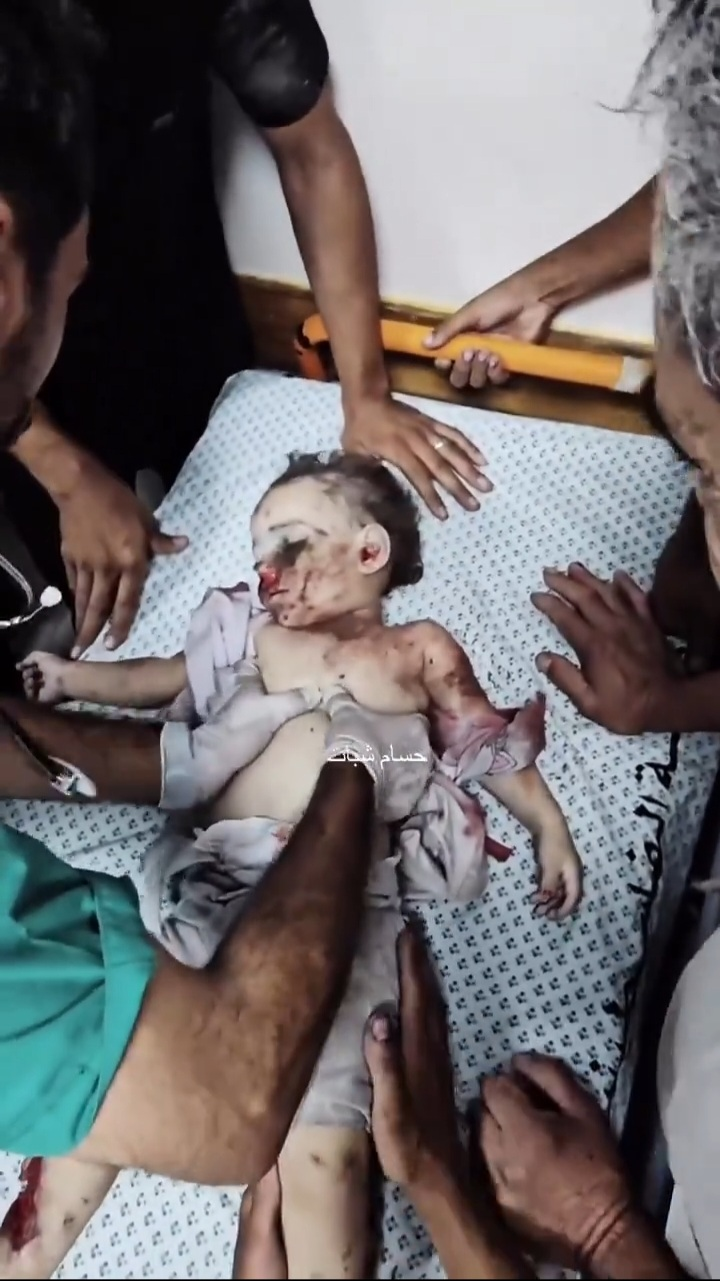
Rescue attempt for one-year-old girl in Gaza, 18 August 2024

Between February and October 2024, numerous doctors returning from Gaza reported treating or witnessing large numbers of children with single gunshot wounds to the head or chest, which they described as evidence of deliberate targeting by Israeli snipers. Testimonies from dozens of medical professionals supported these accounts, with several characterizing the shootings as crimes against humanity.

In June 2026, a 94-page report by the UN Independent International Commission of Inquiry on the Occupied Palestinian Territory concluded there were reasonable grounds to determine that Israeli forces directly targeted children in Gaza using snipers and quadcopter drones. The inquiry also documented a widespread pattern of soldiers filming themselves mocking, weaponizing, and desecrating symbols of childhood across at least 35 instances in private homes and public spaces, which it assessed demonstrated a prevailing dehumanizing attitude enabled by a tacit acceptance among military commanders.

=== Child detention ===
In September 2009, after documentation emerged showing Palestinian children as young as 12 were prosecuted in adult military courts, Israel established a juvenile military court, 'the first and only juvenile military court in operation in the world.' Military Order 1651 establishes a maximum 6 months sentence for children aged 12–13, and 12 months for juniors aged 14–15, unless the offence involves throwing stones at persons or property with the intent to damage, in which case 10 years imprisonment is the maximum penalty.

In one case, a 5-year-old child had been detained on allegations he threw stones in Hebron. The IDF said that the boy had endangered passers-by and that soldiers only accompanied him to his parents. It stated that the child was not arrested and no charges were filed.

A separate study, conducted from 2005 until 2010, was released in mid-2011 by the Jerusalem-based non-profit B'Tselem. The study found that the actions of the IDF potentially violated the Convention on the Rights of the Child and the Fourth Geneva Convention.

According to a March 2013 report by the UNICEF, Israel has arrested some 7,000 Palestinian children; 18 of 27 arrested in Hebron in March 2013 were below the age of 12. The report was based on 400 cases documented since 2009. It stated that the Palestinian children who are detained by the Israeli military are subjected to "widespread, systematic and institutionalized" ill treatment in violation of international law. UNICEF estimated that in the West Bank, IDF and Israeli security services annually arrest around 700 youths between 12 and 17 years old. The report supported claims that the arrests were often made, without notice, in private homes at night. It reports that children are blindfolded, painfully restrained, and subjected to physical and verbal abuse while being detained, sometimes in solitary confinement.

The report further claims that, once in detention, they are interrogated and coerced into confession, without immediate access to a legal counsel or family members. Signed confessions are typically typed in Hebrew, which few Palestinian minors can read. As of January 2013, Israeli military prisons held 233 males under 18, 31 under the age of 16. Additionally, children are shackled during court appearances and made to serve sentences in Israel. UNICEF stated these findings "amount to cruel, inhuman or degrading treatment or punishment according to the Convention on the Rights of the Child and the Convention against Torture." The UN has added the Israeli army to a "blacklist" of countries that have mistreated children in armed conflicts.

About 60 percent of arrested minors are charged with throwing rocks at soldiers or passing cars, which the IDF regards as a form of terrorism as it has led to the death and injury of Israelis, including children.

The UNICEF report noted that Israel had made some positive changes over recent years, such as hand tying measures that do not cause pain or injury, but urged Israel to refrain from blindfolding minors and holding them in solitary confinement, and to permit an attorney or family member to attend interrogations and allow interrogations to be recorded to document any false claims of abuse. Israel stated it would study the conclusions and work to implement them in cooperation with UNICEF. In October 2013, UNICEF reported that the IDF was introducing changes in its arrest of minors in a pilot-test programme, but according to Haaretz, the policy had not at that date been implemented and was still under study.

In January 2015, Euro-Mediterranean Human Rights Monitor reported cases of Palestinian minors being detained by Israeli authorities, including a 14-year-old girl sentenced to one month in prison and fines for her parents. The organization has criticized Israel’s policy of detaining children as abusive and inhumane.

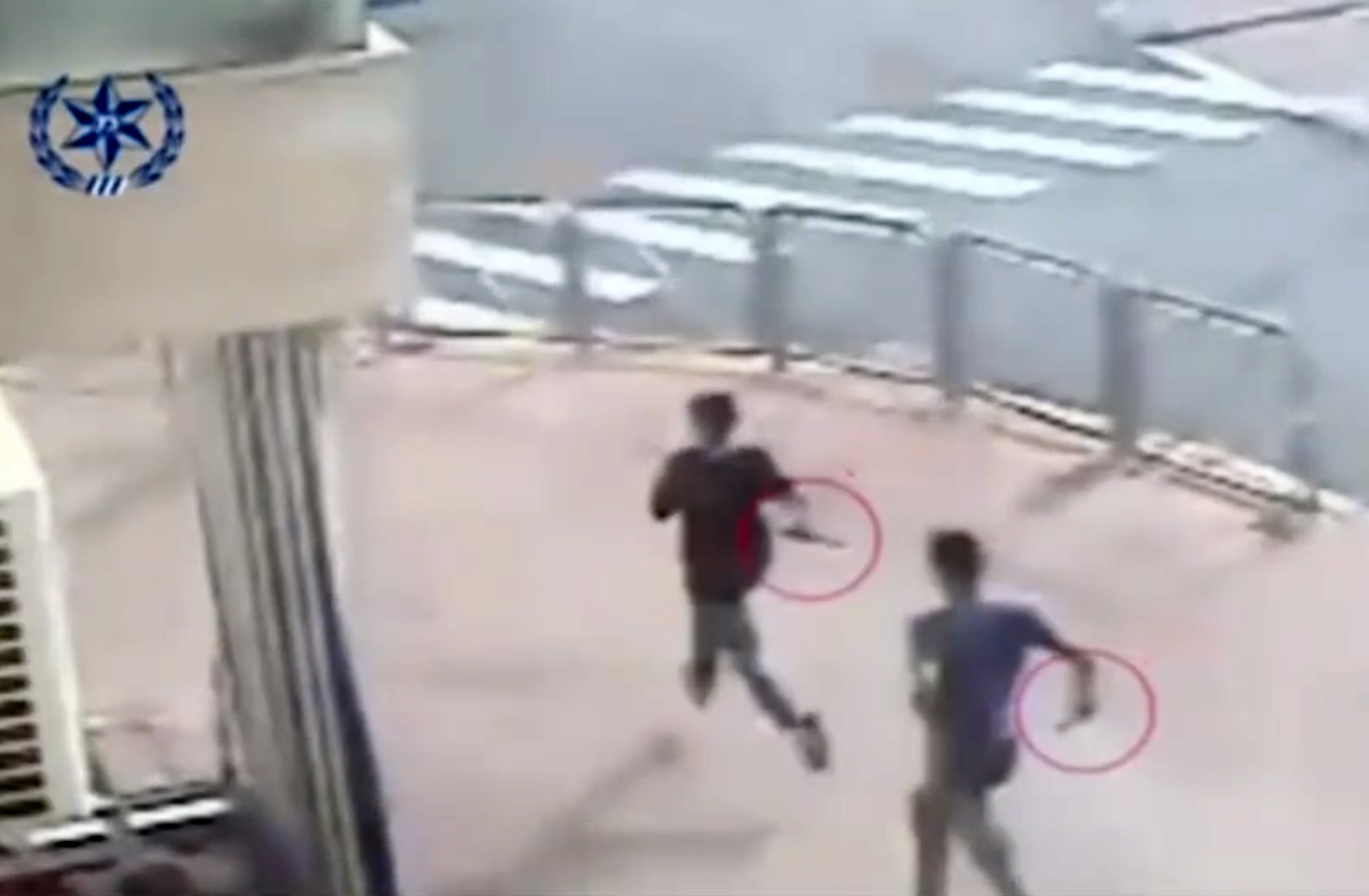
In 2015, two Palestinian boys, 15-year-old Hassan Khalid Manasra and his cousin, 13-year-old Ahmad Manasra, stabbed two Israelis. Ahmad Manasra was sentenced to 9 1/2 years in prison

On 12 October 2015, two Palestinian boys, 15-year-old Hassan Khalid Manasra and his cousin, 13-year-old Ahmad Manasra, both from Beit Hanina, stabbed two Israelis in Pisgat Ze'ev, an Israeli settlement in East Jerusalem. Ahmad Manasra was sentenced by an Israeli court to 9 1/2 years in prison. In response to this attack, and other attacks carried out by Palestinian children against Israelis during the 2015–2016 wave of violence in the Israeli–Palestinian conflict, the Knesset passed a bill that allowed Israeli authorities to imprison children from the age of twelve if convicted of terrorism.

According to the Israeli military and prison service, at the end of February 2018, there were 356 Palestinian minors (defined as before 18th birthday) held as Israeli security detainees and prisoners.

A 2023 report by Save the Children found widespread use of physical, emotional, and sexual abuse against Palestinian children in Israeli military detention. The report found that among detained children, 86% were beaten, 69% were strip-searched, 60% spent time in solitary confinement, 68% were denied any healthcare, and 58% were denied visits or communication with family.

==== Night-raid detentions ====
Many Palestinian children are detained in night raids, with some being placed in administrative detention without undergoing trial or receiving a sentence. According to Lawyers for Palestinian Human Rights, there are numerous significant human rights issues associated with these actions.

=== Use of human shields by the IDF ===
Amnesty International's report into the 2008 Gaza War stated that they had found instances in which the IDF endangered the lives of civilians, including children, by using them as human shields. The report discussed examples such as "forcing them to remain in or near houses which they took over and used as military positions. Some were forced to carry out dangerous tasks such as inspecting properties or objects suspected of being booby-trapped." The Israeli military denied the allegations, saying "The IDF operated in accordance with the rules of war and did the utmost to minimize harm to civilians uninvolved in combat. The IDF's use of weapons conforms to international law." Israel's Intelligence and Terrorism Information Center and the Israeli Ministry of Foreign Affairs likewise accused Hamas and other militant groups of using children as human shields during the Gaza war.

In 2010, two IDF soldiers were convicted of 'excess authority' and 'conduct unbecoming' for using a 9-year-old Palestinian child as a human shield to open packages they suspected of being booby trapped during the 2008 Gaza War. Both soldiers received three months' probation and a demotion in rank. The Israeli Deputy Military Advocate for Operational Affairs commented that "the defendants did not seek to humiliate or degrade the boy."

== Palestinian militant misuse of children ==
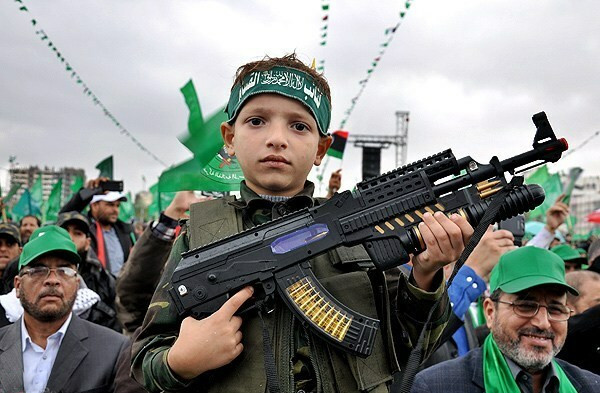
A child with a toy gun in the 25th anniversary of Hamas

Historically, in the final years of the Ottoman Empire, Palestinian children and youths often figured at the forefront of struggles to oppose Jewish immigration into Palestine. According to David M. Rosen, from the beginning of the conflict, the belief developed among militants that youth have a duty to sacrifice themselves. With the emergence of Fatah in the Palestinian diaspora, the PLO created youth groups like the Zahrat (flowers) for girls and Ashbal (lion cubs) for boys in communities of exiled Palestinians. The aim was to provide them with military training as part of a programme to strengthen a Palestinian national self-awareness within the context of a revolutionary culture.

When the First Intifada broke out, a culture of linking the Palestinian stone-throwing child to a shahid quickly developed. In the five years running up to the outbreak of the Second Intifada, the Palestinian Authority created 19 paramilitary training camps for teenagers. The drills include mock kidnappings of Israeli political figures, attacks on military posts and training with Kalashnikovs. Testimonies from young people highlighted an agenda of radicalization. Shaul Kimhi and Shmuel Even, writing of events down to 2003, have argued that children and youths who engage in terrorist acts form part of a fourth category by motivation, which they define as "the exploited."

In October 2000, the Grand Mufti Ekrima Sa'id Sabri incited child suicide bombers when questioned about suicide attacks, he declared: "The younger the martyr, the more I respect him." The participation of children in acts of violence intensified during the Second Intifada, as many children were recruited into Palestinian armed groups. Daphne Burdman (2003) describes a process in which young people were encouraged to die as martyrs through incitement of the Palestinian educational system.

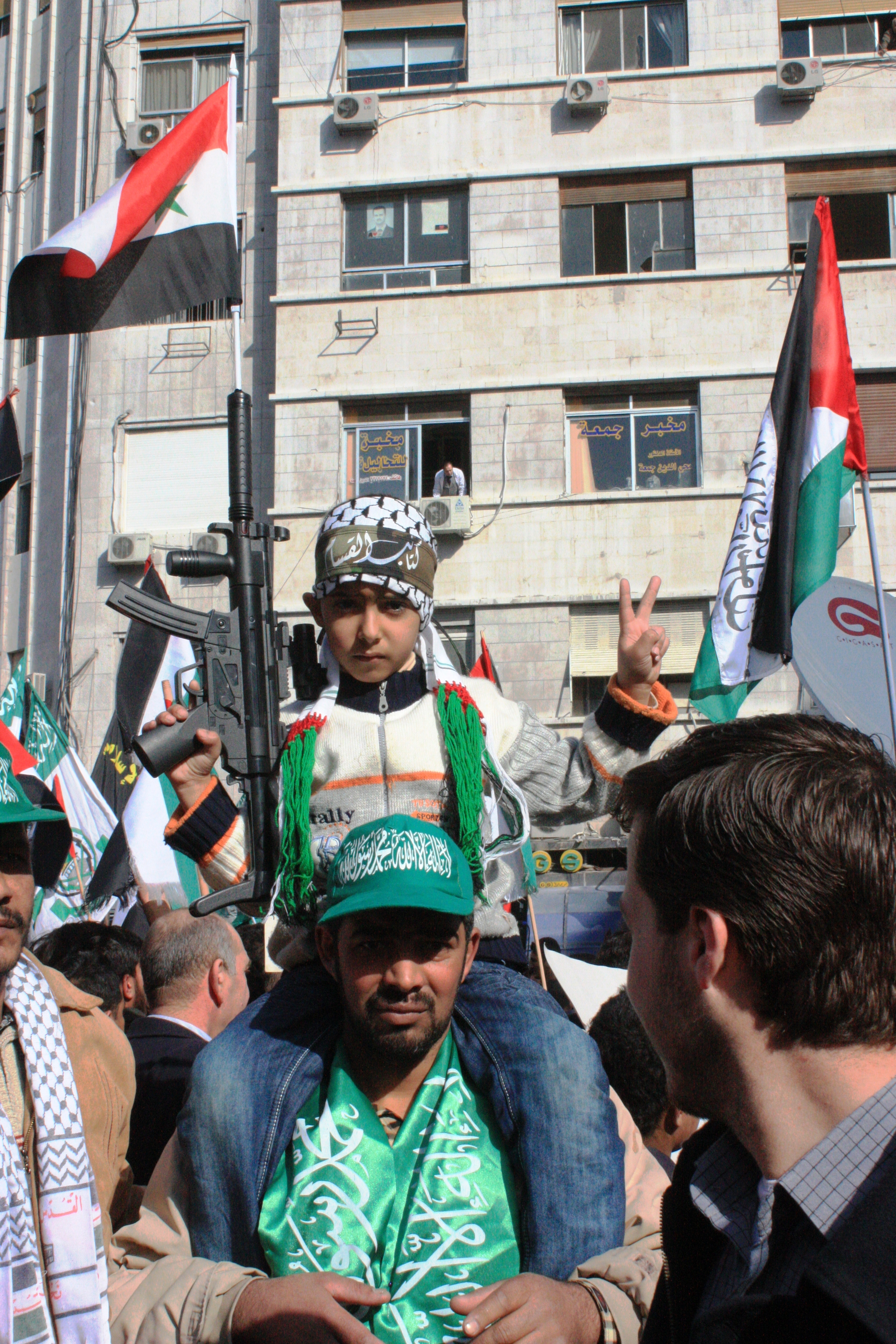
A child holds a toy MP5K at Pro Hamas Rally in Damascus

According to the Coalition to Stop the Use of Child Soldiers' "2004 Global Report on the Use of Child Soldiers," there was "no evidence of systematic recruitment of children by Palestinian armed groups." The report noted that "children are used as messengers and couriers, and in some cases as fighters and suicide bombers in attacks on Israeli soldiers and civilians. All the main political groups involve children in this way, including Fatah, Hamas, Islamic Jihad, and the Popular Front for the Liberation of Palestine." In total, there were at least nine incidents where children were involved in suicide attacks or other violent militant acts.

According to Human Rights Watch, in 2004, the major Palestinian armed groups, including Al-Aqsa Martyrs Brigade, the Popular Front for the Liberation of Palestine, Islamic Jihad, and Hamas "have publicly disavowed the use of children in military operations, but those stated policies have not always been implemented." In part, this is because some leaders state they consider children of 16 to be adults. In 2005, Amnesty International condemned the use of children by Palestinian militant groups, saying: "Palestinian armed groups have repeatedly shown total disregard for the most fundamental human rights, notably the right to life, by deliberately targeting Israeli civilians and by using Palestinian children in armed attacks."

=== Use of human shields by Hamas ===
During the Second Intifada (2000–2005), Haaretz noted that photographs from operations indicated Palestinian gunmen routinely used the dense presence of local civilians, including children, as human shields. The analysis noted that while this made civilian casualties difficult to prevent, the IDF did not view it as a reason to halt the military incursions.

In January 2009, during the 2008–2009 Gaza War, local residents confirmed that Hamas militants had fired mortars from a street near a UNRWA school shelter in Jabalya where civilians had sought refuge. The subsequent Israeli retaliatory mortar fire struck near the perimeter of the facility, killing over thirty people. While Israel stated the strike targeted Hamas operations using the population as human shields, UNRWA officials noted that the coordinates of the marked civilian shelter had been repeatedly provided to Israeli forces and called for an independent international investigation into the high civilian death toll.

During the 2012 Gaza War, Human Rights Watch and the UN Office of the High Commissioner for Human Rights (OHCHR) condemned Palestinian armed groups for launching rockets from densely populated areas near homes and businesses, noting that the practice put civilians at risk and caused several rockets to fall short and kill civilians inside Gaza. The Jerusalem Post reported that the IDF also accused Hamas of using the population as human shields, stating they had released footage of rocket fire originating from homes, public places, and mosque courtyards.

=== Child suicide bombers ===
According to the Coalition to Stop the Use of Child Soldiers' "2004 Global Report on the Use of Child Soldiers," there were at least nine documented suicide attacks involving Palestinian minors between October 2000 and March 2004.

In 2004, The Guardian reported that the Israeli military "accused a faction of Yasser Arafat's Fatah movement of using an 11-year-old boy as an unwitting human bomb after the child was discovered carrying explosives through an army checkpoint in Nablus." In 2009, a 14-year-old was captured by Israeli soldiers and told of being given $23 and a suicide bomber's vest. His family said he was gullible and easily manipulated.

Shafiq Masalha, a clinical psychologist who teaches at Tel Aviv University, wrote in 2004 that 15 percent of Palestinian children dreamt of becoming suicide bombers. According to Eyad Sarraj, Palestinian psychiatrist and director of the Gaza Community Mental Health Program, a survey by his program found that 36 percent of Palestinians over 12 aspired to die "a martyr's death" fighting Israel.

Former UN Under-Secretary General Olara Otunnu stated in 2003: "We have witnessed both ends of these acts: children have been used as suicide bombers and children have been killed by suicide bombings. I call on the Palestinian authorities to do everything within their powers to stop all participation by children in this conflict."

== Living conditions ==
=== Humanitarian reports during the Gaza War ===
A week after the start of the Gaza War in October 2023, UNICEF said that the utmost priorities lie in establishing an instant cessation of hostilities and ensuring unimpeded access for humanitarian aid, thereby facilitating the provision of essential assistance to the children and families residing in Gaza. It is imperative to acknowledge that regardless of their location, every child deserves protection and should never be subjected to any form of aggression. During his visit to Israel and the Occupied Palestinian Territory, UN relief chief Martin Griffiths had a conversation with families in Gaza over the phone from east Jerusalem on Tuesday. He expressed his deep concern about the immense suffering they have experienced since Israel began its retaliation for Hamas' deadly attacks on 7 October. Griffiths described the situation as "extremely devastating." UNICEF's James Elder emphasized that the dangers extend beyond explosive devices and artillery. The escalating peril in the enclave lies in the increasing number of infant fatalities caused by dehydration. This threat arises from Gaza's water production, which currently stands at a mere five percent of the necessary capacity due to the inoperable desalination plants, either damaged or lacking fuel. Elder further stated that the repercussions for children will persist for generations once the conflict eventually ceases. The survivors' enduring psychological trauma will burden them for decades to come.

Save the Children, UNICEF, and Palestinian health officials described children being left with permanent disabilities, mental health issues, and amputations, with thousands experiencing dehydration, malnutrition, respiratory, and skin diseases. By late March 2024, an estimated 13,000 children in Gaza had been killed during the Israeli invasion of the Gaza Strip beginning the previous October, with thousands more buried under rubble. The UNICEF deputy director called the conditions of children in Gaza the "most horrific" he had ever seen. (Note: He also called for immediate and "unconditional" release of Israeli children who are being held hostage by Hamas.) The ongoing crisis also impacted routine vaccinations, leaving thousands of children at risk, and further compounded challenges included inadequate shelter, a lack of adequate winter coats, and the psychological toll on children's mental health.

=== Displaced children ===
According to UNRWA, as of 10 March 2024, there are over 187,000 individuals who have recently been displaced in Gaza. A significant number of these individuals, including numerous children, have sought refuge in UNRWA schools. Unfortunately, some of the facilities providing shelter to these displaced families, such as schools, have also suffered damage.

=== Poverty ===
Israeli limits on the free movement of people and goods significantly constrain the Palestinian economy. The impact of poverty on the lives of children is manifold: their education frequently remains unfinished as they drop out of school at a tender age, typically to labor and support their families. Poverty gives rise to early marriages among young girls and contributes to adolescent delinquency.

=== Schooling disruptions ===
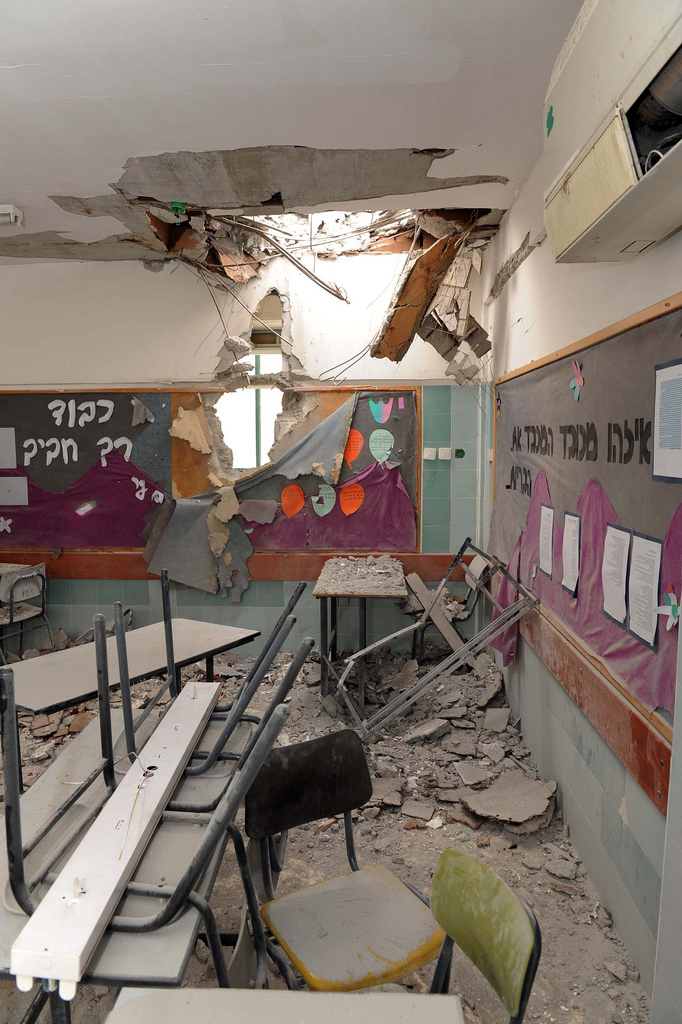
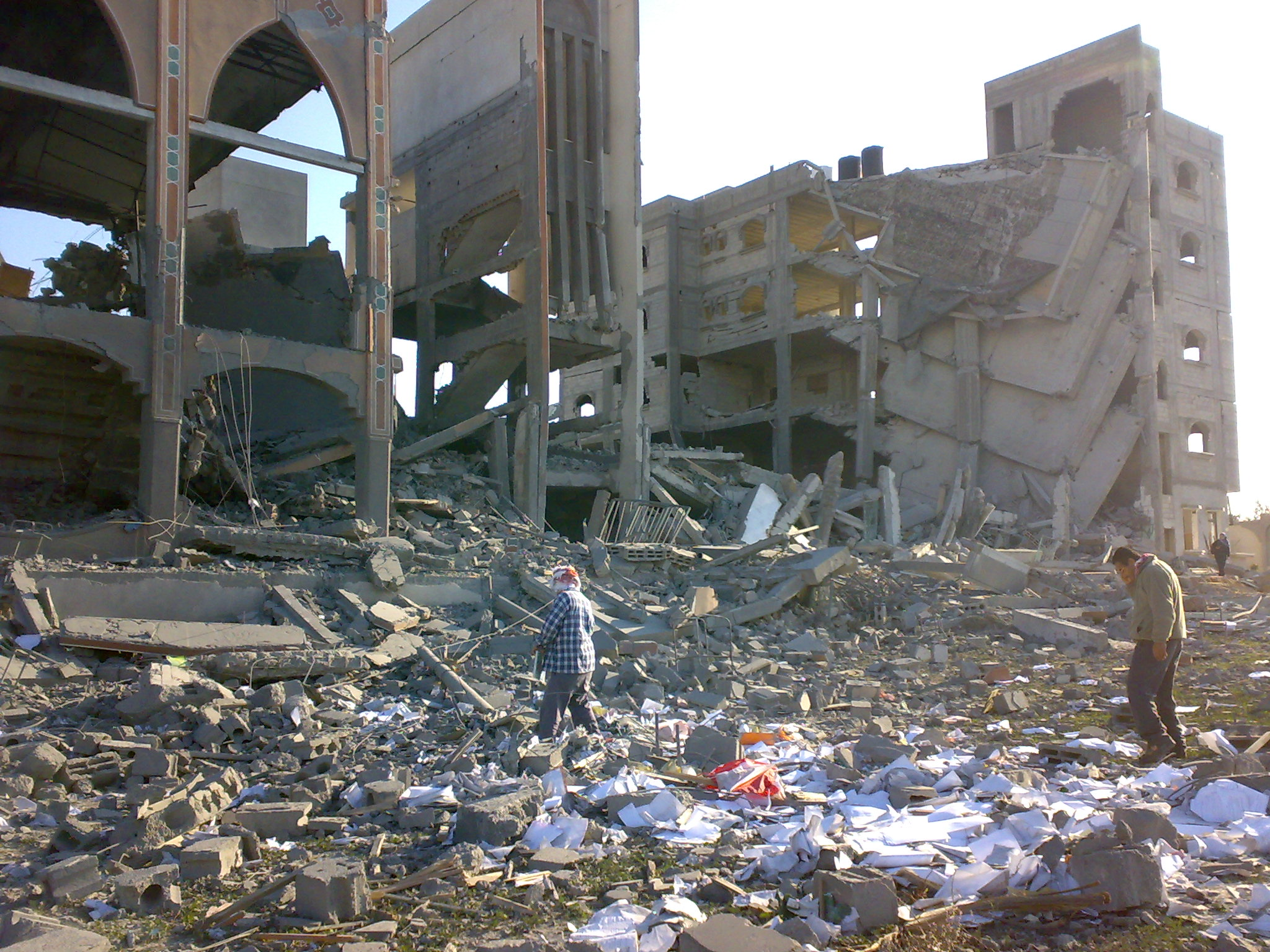
Israeli kindergarten after rocket attack from Gaza (left) and one of 18 Gaza schools destroyed by Israel in the Gaza War (right).

Schooling has been disrupted for both Israeli and Palestinian children. Israeli children at or on the way to school have been killed by Palestinian militants, as in the 1970 Avivim school bus bombing that killed nine children and injured 25, the 1974 Ma'alot massacre which resulted in the death of 22 elementary school children, the 1992 murder of Helena Rapp, the 1997 Island of Peace massacre where seven school girls on a class field trip were shot and killed, the 2002 killing of three teenagers at the Hitzim yeshiva high school in Itamar, and the 2008 Jerusalem yeshiva attack resulting in 8 children killed and 11 injured.

Schools throughout southern Israel are closed when rocket fire from Gaza becomes intense, including those in major cities such as Beersheba and Ashdod. Israeli authorities have reported incidents in which schools were damaged and school buses destroyed by Qassam rockets and mortars.

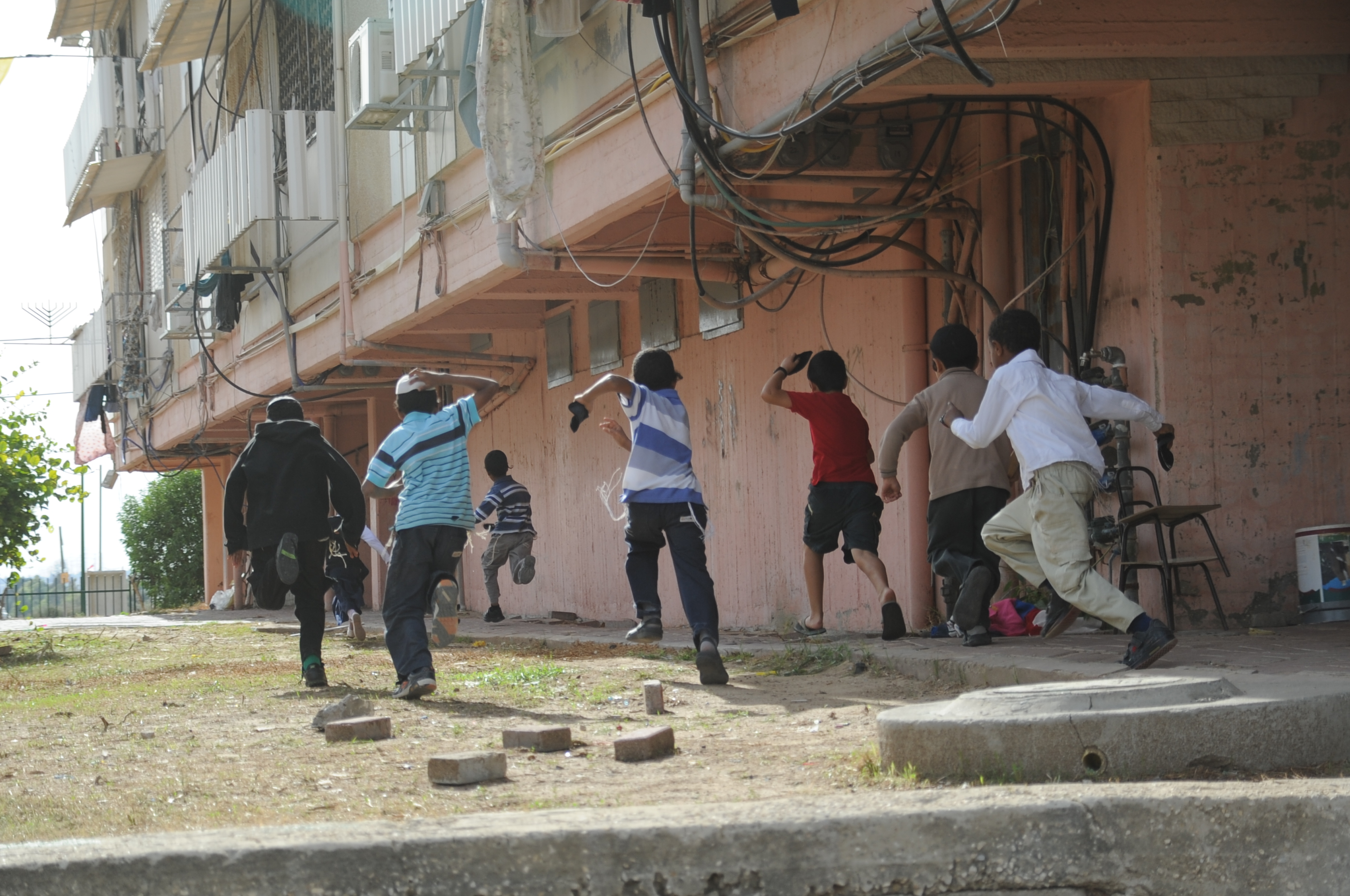
Children from the Israeli town of Kiryat Malachi running for shelter as rockets are fired from Gaza during the 2012 Gaza War

Israel has closed schools in the West Bank for months during periods of conflict. In 1989, 200,000 students were kept out of class from January to July. During the Israeli curfews imposed in 2002, teachers and students created makeshift schools in halls, living rooms and alleys so students would not have to travel by car or bus to get to school. Israel's separation barrier has separated some students from their schools, leading to long waits at checkpoints. In 2008, Israel closed two charity schools for needy children because Israel suspected they were tied to Hamas. Schools in Gaza also close during clashes, as during the November 2012 Gaza War.

Israeli weapon strikes in Gaza have destroyed or damaged Palestinian schools. Ninety-three schools were shelled in 2000–2001. During the three-week Gaza War, Israeli airstrikes destroyed 18 schools and damaged 280, including United Nations Relief and Works Agency schools. Israel's blockade of the Gaza Strip prohibited the import of school supplies and school construction materials into Gaza. In 2011, after months of negotiations, Israel allowed in enough material to build 18 new schools.

Settlers also have disrupted the schooling of children. In 2002, there was one attempted and two actual bombings of Palestinian schools by Jewish vigilante groups. In 2011, United Nations Special Rapporteur Richard A. Falk said that many Palestinian children have stopped attending school because of frequent settler harassment.

In Palestine, around 70% of children attend primary school. Children living in refugee camps and villages without schools face challenges in accessing education. A 2013 UNICEF study revealed that over 2,500 children in educated communities pass through at least one checkpoint daily to reach school, leading to school dropouts and child labor. Additionally, the limited number of classes available results in overcrowded classrooms, poor teaching quality, and schools lacking resources and materials. Following the November 2012 Gaza War, numerous schools in Gaza were damaged or destroyed. In 2013, UNICEF reported that over 123,000 children had to halt their education.

Due to the ongoing relentless bombing campaign in October 2023, the progress of education has once again been disrupted. Schools have been transformed into temporary shelters, prioritizing survival over learning. The Education Above All (EAA) Foundation, renowned for its provision of scholarships to Palestinians in need, suffered destruction on Tuesday. In response, the EAA issued a statement condemning the destruction, emphasizing that such acts of collective punishment, reprisals, and attacks on civilians and infrastructure are grave breaches of international humanitarian law. Furthermore, if these actions are intentional, they qualify as war crimes.

=== Youth program ===
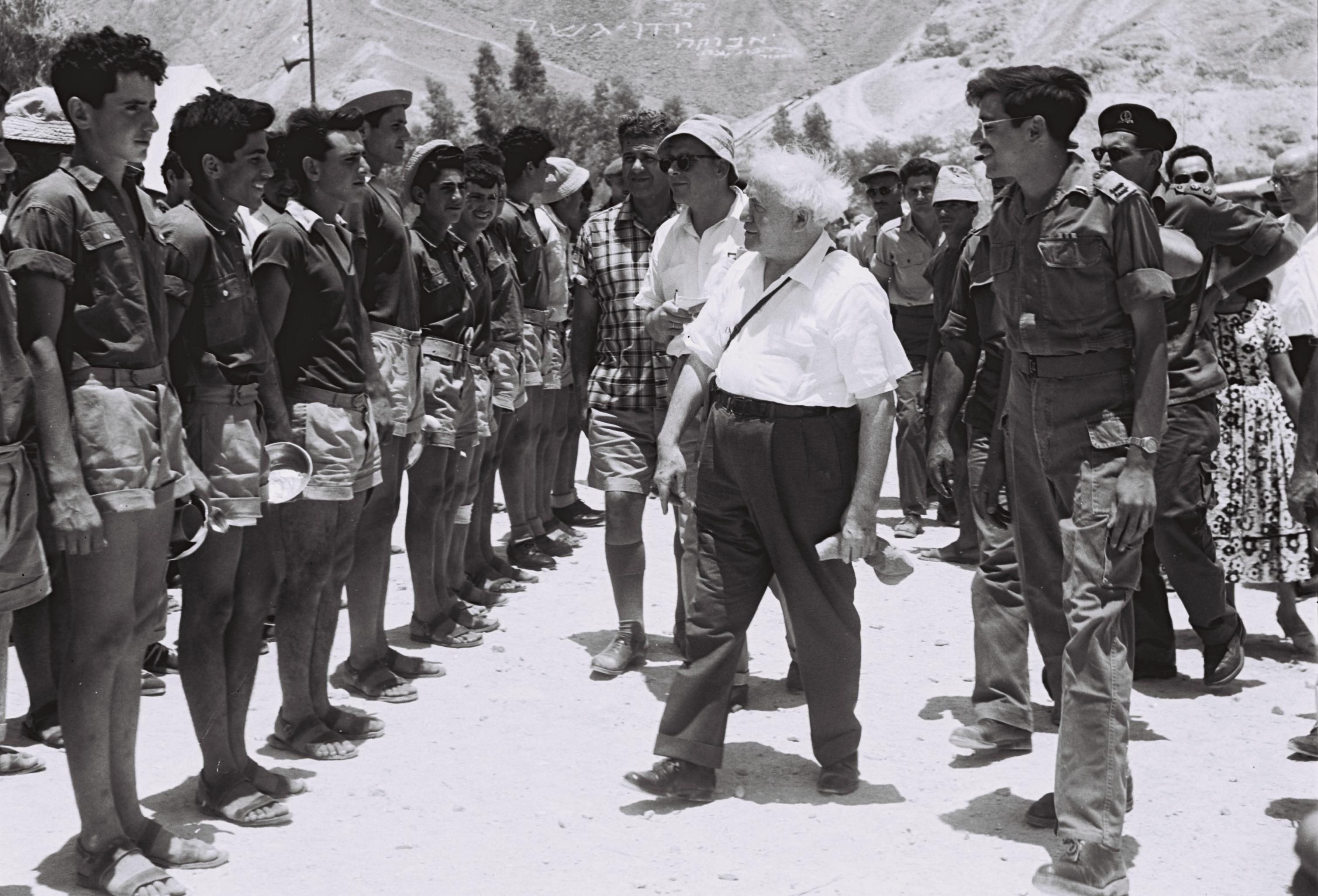
David Ben-Gurion visiting a Gadna base in Be'er Ora (1957). Gadna is a one-week Israeli military program to prepare youth for their mandatory military service in the Israel Defense Forces or Border Police.

Gadna is an Israeli pre-army military program that prepares high school students for their mandatory service. Gadna was created before the Israeli declaration of independence. During the 1948 Arab–Israeli War, trainees served as combatants. Until 1990, Gadna focused on instilling patriotic values in Israeli youth and encouraging the immigration of youth to Israel. Nowadays, the program concentrates on increasing motivation to serve in the Army. As of 2007, an estimated minority of 16,000 to 19,000 11th-grade pupils annually engage in squad-sized operations, night treks and shooting, with the promise of rewards for excellence when the youth join the Israel Defense Forces. Educators have criticized the program as "overly militaristic." The one-week-long program was revised in 2007 to include lessons in combat doctrine, the purity of arms and ethics in combat.

== Effects on children ==
In 2024, a year into the Gaza war, 20,000 Palestinian children had been orphaned, abandoned or separated from their parents. In a number of camps surveyed, 60% have developed stammers or other impediments to communicating. 40% of families took into their care children from other families. 85% of parents stated that for at least one day, their children had gone without food. 346,000 under 5 required supplementary food and nutrients. 50,000 suffered from acute malnutrition. On average, schoolchildren in the Strip have lost the equivalent of 2 years of education, and there has been an increase of 20% in the number of 10-year-olds who cannot read a basic text.

=== Malnutrition ===
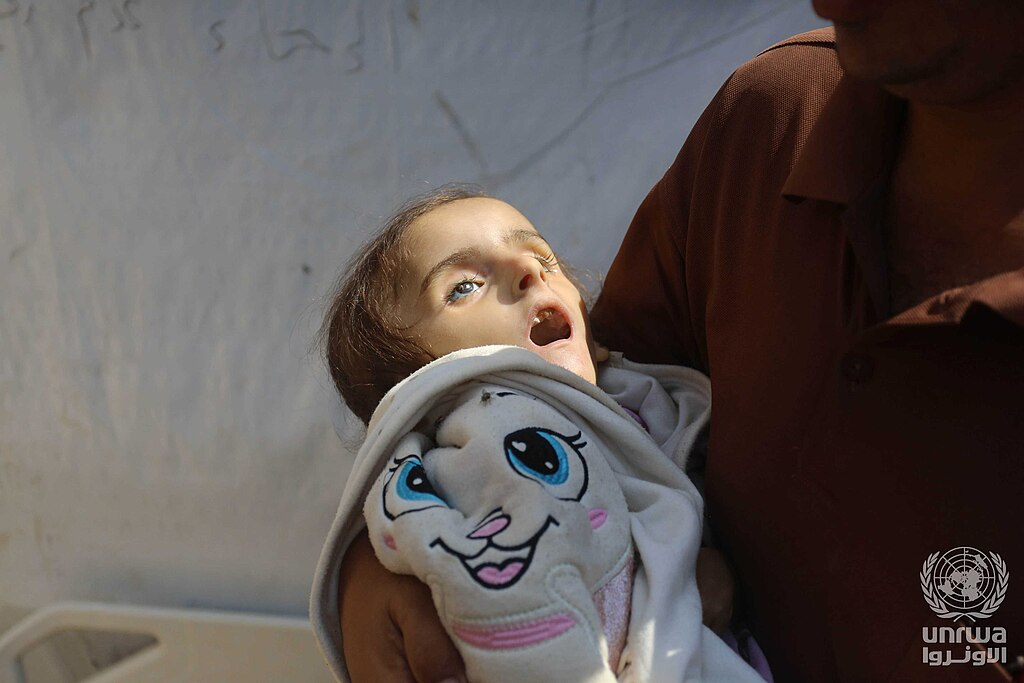
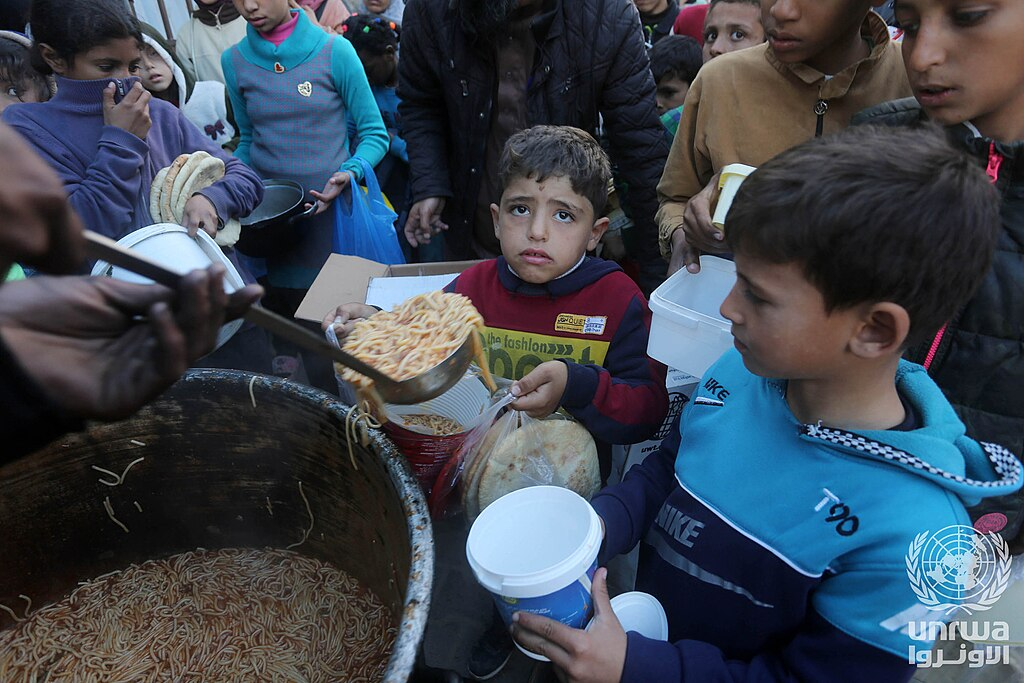
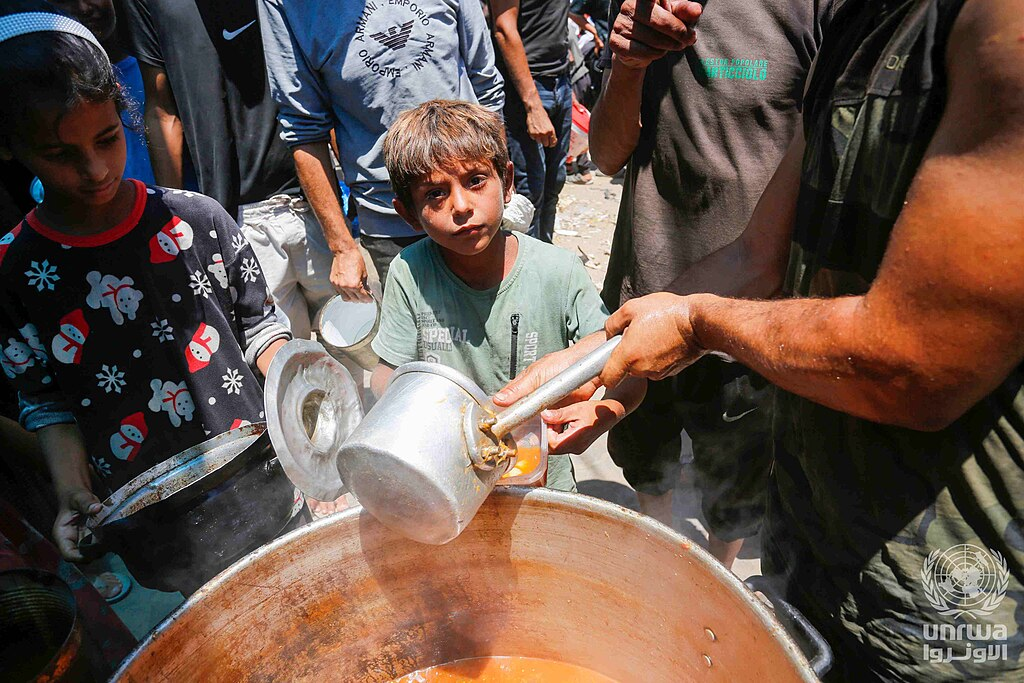
Image from the 2023–25 Gaza War, clockwise from top:
- 4-year-old Palestinian girl, died due to malnutrition and lack of treatment
- Displaced Palestinians gather to receive food from a charity in Deir el-Balah, Gaza Strip
- Displaced Palestinians receive food from charitable Tekiya during Ramadan in Deir el-Balah, Gaza Strip

In a 2003 United Nations report, Special Rapporteur Jean Ziegler reported that over 22 percent of children under 5 in the Palestinian territories were suffering from malnutrition and 15.6 percent from acute anaemia. According to the World Bank, food consumption in the Palestinian Territories fell by more than 25 percent per capita, and food shortages, particularly of proteins, were reported. A 2007 Palestinian Central Bureau of Statistics poll of Palestinian children in the West Bank and Gaza found that as a result of poverty, about 10 percent of Palestinian children suffer "permanent effects from malnutrition", including especially stunted growth. In 2010, the Danish government sponsored a survey that found that 10 percent of children in Gaza are malnourished.

A 2012 report jointly issued by aid organizations Save the Children and Britain's Medical Aid for Palestinians found that 10 percent of Gaza children under five had stunted growth due to malnutrition and that 68 percent of pre-school children and 58 percent of children of school age suffered from anaemia. The report stated that the five-year blockade of Gaza Strip, which has prevented importation of necessary supplies and materials, as well as Israel's Gaza War bombing of infrastructure, has led to water being severely contaminated by fertilizer and human waste. Diseases like typhoid and diarrhea, spread by contaminated water, have doubled in children under the age of 3, which has long-term health implications. Open sewage is a problem and in 2012 three children drowned in pools of it.

From 2 March until 26 May 2025, Israel completely blocked all supplies from entering Gaza, making it the longest complete closure in the history of the blockade. Since 26 May 2025, the United States- and Israeli-backed Gaza Humanitarian Foundation has facilitated limited and largely ineffective aid distribution. In June 2025, UNICEF-supported clinics in Gaza reported a sharp rise in child malnutrition: 16,736 children were treated between January and May 2025, including 5,119 in May alone. This was nearly 50% more than in April and over double the February figure. Of these, 636 had severe acute malnutrition, the deadliest form, which has risen by about 146% since February. UNICEF warns that without large-scale aid deliveries, acute malnutrition could reach its highest level since the conflict began, despite wasting being virtually absent 20 months earlier.

=== Lack of fresh water ===
In 2024, due to the scarcity of water resources, hygiene often takes a backseat to meeting basic needs such as food and drink. In addition, the consumption of non-potable water can result in serious illnesses among children, including diarrhea and hepatitis.

In Gaza, a staggering 95% of the water is not safe for human consumption. The pollution levels are so high that it is projected that the region will run out of drinkable water by 2016, with irreversible consequences by 2020. The excessive nitrate content, largely stemming from inadequate wastewater management, is responsible for numerous illnesses affecting infants and young children.

=== Hypothermia ===
Severe winter conditions pose a significant risk to the welfare of the population, especially children and those already grappling with illness and malnourishment. In the midst of assaults by the Israel Defense Forces, displaced Palestinians who fled their homes with minimal belongings face additional hardships during winters in Gaza. With the besieged enclave preparing for a harsh winter, Norwegian physician Mads Gilbert has issued a warning regarding the heightened danger of fatal hypothermia among the already vulnerable residents. The doctor emphasized that hypothermia weakens the body, suppresses the immune system, and increases the risk of excessive bleeding in the event of an injury. It is a perilous trap that must be taken seriously.

=== Unexploded ordnance ===
Accidents from children playing with unexploded ordnance are a low-level but recurrent threat to children's health. The majority of incidents involving unexploded ordnance occurred in the Gaza Strip.

=== Psychological impact and trauma ===
Caitlin Procter, a researcher at the Centre on Conflict, Development and Peacebuilding in Geneva, expressed that the psychological impact on the related children is unparalleled due to their homes being bombed. They endured extreme conditions of freezing cold and starvation, and many were left to fend for themselves in the streets. This has resulted in an overwhelming situation where even mental health experts for children in Gaza are feeling completely inundated and in need of assistance. In Rafah, located in the southern part of the Palestinian enclave, where nearly 1.3 million displaced Gazans reside, Karyn Beattie, team leader of the NGO Save the Children in Gaza, observed that "children are everywhere in the streets." Some of these children, who are not yet teenagers, have taken on the responsibility of providing for their families. They carry heavy containers of water or sell food aid they have received on the streets, often using the proceeds to purchase other essential items. The mental anguish experienced by children who have managed to survive, along with the complete destruction of essential infrastructure such as residences, educational institutions, and medical facilities, has severely impacted their prospects for the future.

UNICEF expressed sorrow over the impact of war on children, highlighting the prevalence of flashbacks, nightmares, and agoraphobia among the young residents of the Gaza Strip. A study conducted by the organization revealed that 88% of children in the area are suffering from fear and trauma.

Researchers are finding high levels of post-traumatic stress disorder among Palestinian children. According to some researchers, the average rate of post-traumatic stress disorder among children from both sides of the Green Line is about 70 percent. Gaza Community Health Programs carried out a study and found that the Post Traumatic Stress Disorder (PTSD) rate for children in Gaza was that 54 percent suffered from severe PTSD, 33.5 percent from moderate and 11% from mild and doubtful levels of PTSD. In a report published in The Canadian Journal of Psychiatry, it was estimated that the rate of psychological morbidity in the southern region of Bethlehem in the West Bank is 42.3 percent among Palestinian children. The rate was 46.3 percent for boys and 37.8 percent for girls. These rates, the study reported, were twice the rate of psychological morbidity in the Gaza Strip.

According to some reports, more than 370,000 Palestinian children have been left shell-shocked by the 2014 Israeli war on Gaza.

Israeli professor Edward Kaufman has written that widespread PTSD among Israeli children is caused by "the environment of fear resulting from indiscriminate acts of terror." According to an Israeli child psychiatrist, about half of the children in Jerusalem, the city hit hardest by Palestinian violence, experience symptoms of post-traumatic stress disorder, two to three times higher than the rate of children suffering from other causes of trauma. A recent study by Herzog's trauma centre found that 33 percent of Israeli youth have been affected personally by terrorism, either by being at the scene of an attack or by knowing someone injured or killed by terrorists. Seventy percent of those surveyed reported increased subjective fear or hopelessness. Studies have found high levels of PTSD in southern Israel, which is frequently attacked by rockets and mortars from the Gaza Strip. In particular, frequent air-raid sirens and explosions of incoming projectiles have caused severe psychological trauma in the city of Sderot.

The Gaza war, the bloodiest of the wars Gaza has experienced in the 21st century, had a catastrophic effect on children in Gaza and weeks of sustained air strikes and explosions have contributed to their psychological destruction. Following 16 days of bombardment, children developed severe trauma, with symptoms including convulsion, aggression, bed-wetting, and nervousness. 90% of children in pediatric hospitals in Gaza exhibited or reported symptoms of anxiety, the majority exhibited post-traumatic stress symptoms, and 82% reported fears of imminent death.

In 2012, a joint study of Palestinian, Jewish-Israeli and Arab-Israeli children found that exposure to political conflict and violence contributed to an increase in aggressive behavior. According to the study, "Palestinian children were at the greatest risk for exposure to violence across settings as well as at the highest level of aggressive behavior in comparison to the two other groups. Males were uniformly at greater risk than females for all forms of exposure to violence as well as more aggressive."

Israeli Professor Edward Kaufman has written that Israel's faith in military superiority, its use of "extrajudicial executions" or "targeted elimination" of suspects that often result in the deaths of innocents, has exacerbated the conflict. He writes it has resulted in the fact that "Israeli schoolchildren are among the most violent in the world, a phenomenon believed to be the result of force being an accepted societal means of dispute resolution. An astonishing 43 percent of Israeli children have admitted to bullying others, while one in four Israeli boys admitted to carrying a knife to school for protection. It is only to be expected that Israel's use of overwhelming force to deal with the Palestinians has had a trickle-down effect on society. The culture of violence prevalent in Israel has had a dramatic impact on the most impressionable members of the community: children."

== Medical care ==
=== Organ donation between Israelis and Palestinians ===
Hadassah Medical Center has reported that organ donations in which the recipient is a Palestinian and the donor an Israeli, or vice versa, are not unusual. In one case, a Palestinian from Bethlehem received the kidney of an Israeli. The families of Yoni Jesner, a Jewish teenager, and Ahmed Khatib, a Palestinian boy, donated their organs to children from opposite sides of the Israeli–Palestinian conflict. Yoni Jesner died in a suicide bombing in 2002, while Ahmed Khatib was killed by IDF gunfire in 2005.

=== Israeli ===
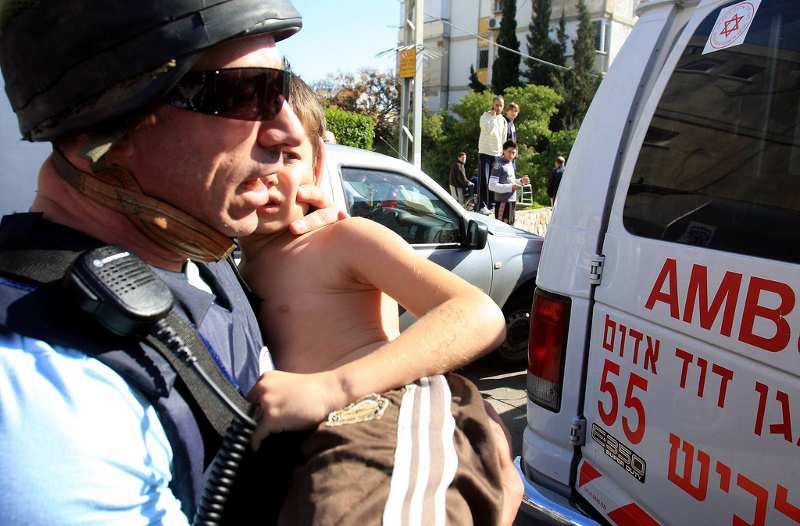
An Israeli child wounded by a Hamas Grad rocket fired on the city of Beer Sheva is taken to a hospital

Israel has maintained a system of socialized health care for all Israelis since its establishment in 1948. A National Health Insurance law was passed in 1995. Coverage includes medical diagnosis and treatment, preventive medicine, hospitalization, surgery and transplants, preventive dental care for children, and other benefits.

The Israeli–Palestinian conflict, however, has been found to have negative impacts on children's health and medical care. A 2007 study found that stress from the violence in years prior has led to sharply increased levels of alcohol consumption, smoking, and substance abuse among Israeli adolescents. It stated, in part, that "Close physical exposure to acts of terrorism was positively associated with higher levels of alcohol consumption, binge drinking, and cannabis that were significant before and after we controlled for PTSS and depression." The study concluded that there is a high risk of future health complications as a result of these behaviors.

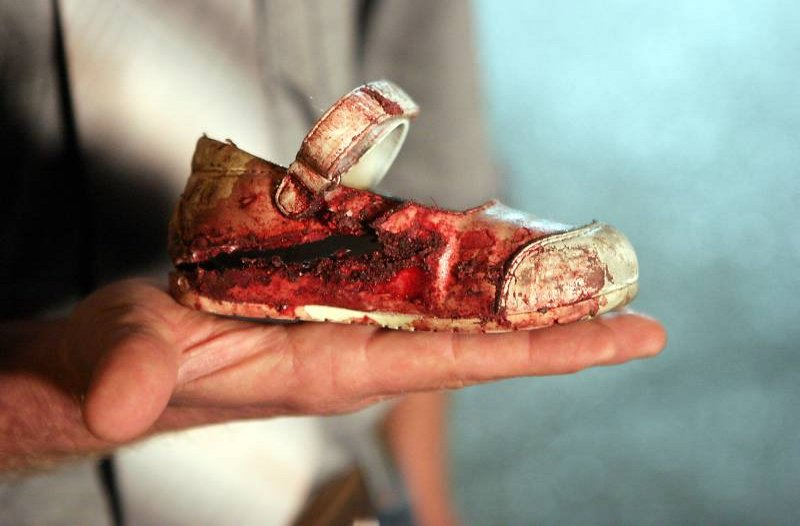
Child's shoe found after Gazan rocket fire hit a mall, injuring a child and others

The Unit of Emergency Medicine from Schneider Children's Medical Center of Israel performed a two-year research and review surrounding the medical care of child terror victims. The results, which were published in 2003, stated, "During the study period, 41 mass-casualty events (MCEs) were managed by Magen David Adom. Each event involved on average, 32 regular and nine mobile intensive care unit ambulances with 93 medics, 19 paramedics, and four physicians. Evacuation time was 5–10 minutes in urban areas and 15–20 minutes in rural areas. In most cases, victims were evacuated to multiple facilities. To improve efficiency and speed, the Magen David Adom introduced the use of well-trained 'first-responders' and volunteer, off-duty professionals, in addition to 'scoop and run' on-the-scene management." It added that "Compared to children with non-terrorism-related injuries, the terrorism-related group had a higher rate of surgical interventions, longer hospital stays, and greater needs for rehabilitation services."

Hospitals in southern Israel have been damaged by Qassam rockets from Gaza, and ambulances have been delayed by Palestinians pelting them with rocks. In 2012, Israeli police reported that a Palestinian suspect had confessed to a nationalistically motivated poisoning of a Jewish family's kitchen in Ra'anana in October 2011, an incident that led to the hospitalization of three adults, including a police officer, and one child.

=== Palestinian ===
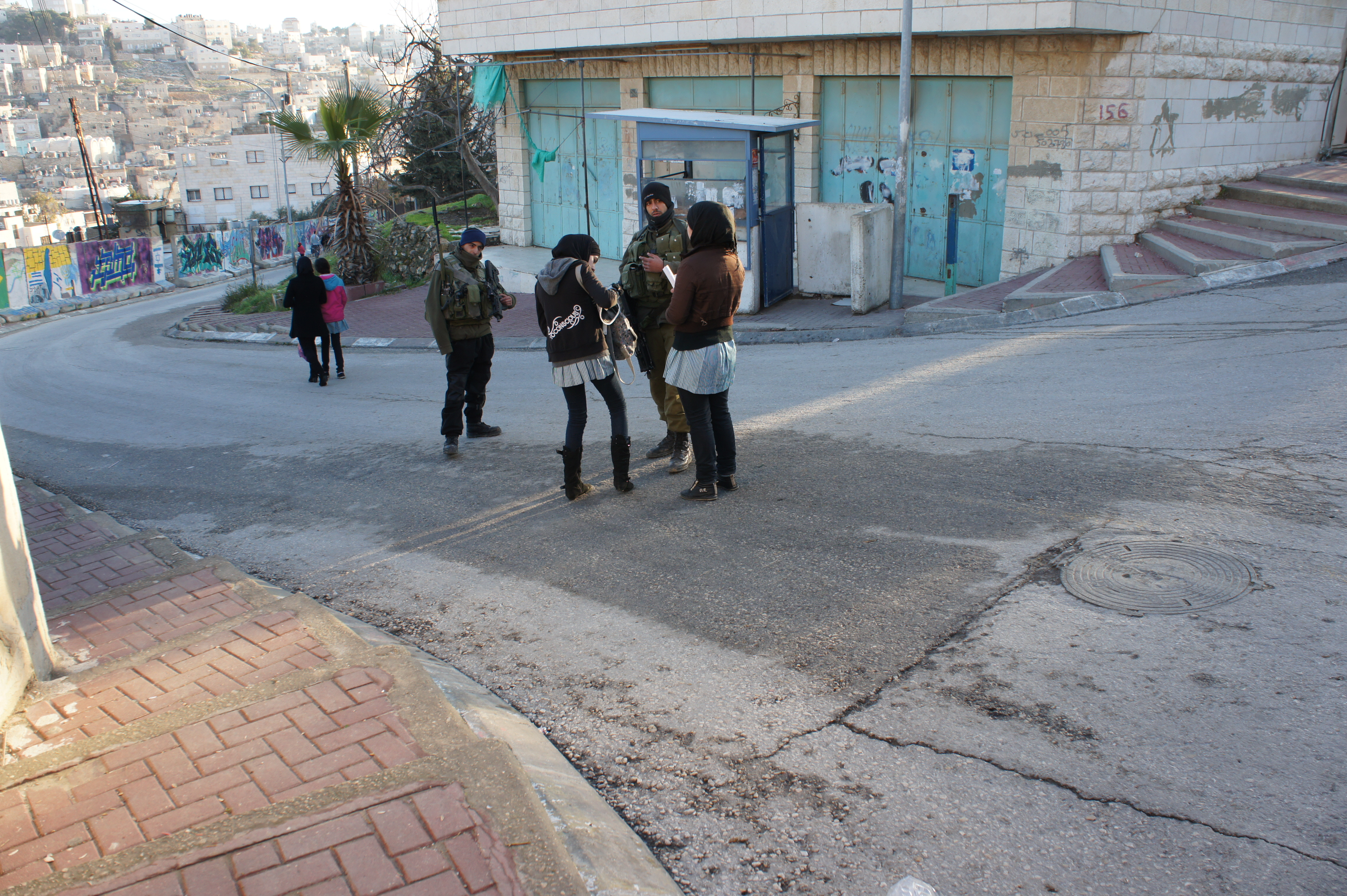
Golani Brigade Israeli soldiers inspect Palestinian school-girls at a checkpoint in Tel Rumeida, Hebron.

Since the 1990s, and especially since the violence associated with the Second Intifada, Israel has created hundreds of permanent roadblocks and checkpoints staffed by the Israeli military or border police. While some are between Israel and the West Bank to prevent possible terrorist attacks, as of September 2011, most were within the West Bank, with 522 such permanent and an average of 495 temporary "flying checkpoints." A 2009 United Nations report stated that the checkpoints were evolving into "a more permanent system of control" reducing the space available for Palestinian growth and movement for the benefit of the increasing Israeli settler population. A 2002 incident of a bomb found in a Red Crescent ambulance increased vigilance regarding those vehicles.

In 2004, psychiatrist Derek Summerfield wrote in an opinion piece in the British Medical Journal that the then-recent Israeli military reoccupation of the West Bank and Gaza divided communities by "checkpoints", put up massive walls like the Israeli West Bank barrier and the Gaza Strip barrier and demolished 60,000 homes. The World Bank estimated that due to these actions, Palestinian poverty had tripled in three years, with 60% of the population subsisting at poverty level and over half of the households eating just one meal daily. The barrier was isolating 97 primary health clinics and 11 hospitals from Palestinian patients. During that time, there were 87 cases in which denial of access to medical treatment caused death, including 30 children. Some babies born while women in labor were kept at checkpoints. Summerfield said that Physicians for Human Rights–Israel has criticized the Israel Medical Association for its silence on these issues.

In response to the Summerfield opinion piece, Irwin Mansdorf, a member of Task Force on Medical and Public Health Issues, Scholars for Peace in the Middle East, wrote an opinion piece about routine care that Palestinians continue to receive in Israeli hospitals and from Israeli physicians, saying that "Palestinians receive care in Israel that they could not receive in any neighboring Arab country. In the last few months alone, nearly 200 Palestinian children who were referred under a joint Israeli–Palestinian programme to treat children with serious medical conditions have already undergone major surgery at Israeli hospitals at no cost to the families. Another 350–400 Palestinian children have undergone free diagnostic testing." Simon M Fellerman also wrote a further 2004 opinion piece noting that Israel had launched several public outreach initiatives, such as Saving Children, established by the Peres Center for Peace, which enabled hundreds of Palestinian children to receive free medical care, in particular cardiac surgery, from Israeli surgeons. In response to the Lancet report, an Israeli government spokesperson said that Palestinians in the territories could receive medical care in Israel itself, noting that 28,000 Palestinians from Gaza had been treated in Israel during the two years covered by the Lancet report.

A 2009 The Lancet medical journal report, authored by Dr. Awad Mataria and Dr. Hanan Abdul Rahim, described the healthcare system in the Palestinian territories as "fragmented and incoherent." Dr. Rahim said there were gaps in care, a low level of post-natal care, and little decline in infant mortality rates compared with other Arab countries that had been able to bring them down. The report cited a United Nations report that stated more than 60 Palestinian women had given birth at Israeli checkpoints and 36 of their babies died as a result. The physicians blamed conditions of military occupation, Palestinian political instability, inconsistent and fragmented foreign aid donor policies and a focus on emergency aid, as opposed to long-term development inside the Palestinian territories. The World Health Organization reports regularly on health care in the "occupied Palestinian territory."

"Save A Child's Heart" is another program in which any child with heart problems can receive free medical attention and surgery from select doctors and hospitals within Israel. As of 2009, it had operated on 1000 Palestinian children.

In 2011, the Israeli Civil Administration's Health Coordinator, Dalia Bassa and the Commander of the IDF's Alpine unit jointly organized a ski trip to Mt. Hermon in northern Israel for Palestinian children diagnosed with cancer. The children, who were accompanied by parents, family members, and Israeli soldiers from the Alpine Unit, are undergoing treatment at the Augusta Victoria Hospital in Jerusalem.

==== During the Gaza War ====
The Gaza war, that began in 2023, has sharply curtailed Gaza’s healthcare system, with most hospitals in Gaza damaged or out of service. This makes it impossible to access even basic care and leads to growing obstacles for those in need of specialized treatment and support. The humanitarian consequences fall especially hard on children.

== Media manipulation ==
Some images of children in the conflict have been shown to be false, digitally altered, or outdated, and are used to manipulate public sentiment.

During the March 2012 Gaza–Israel clashes, Khulood Badawi, an Information and Media Coordinator for the United Nations Office for the Coordination of Humanitarian Affairs, tweeted a picture of a Palestinian child covered in blood. She was criticized because the child was 5-year-old Raja Abu Shaban, who was killed in 2006 when she fell from a swing, and not in an Israeli attack. Badawi later tweeted that she mistakenly had tweeted an old photo. Ma'an News Agency reported the hospital medical report on the dead girl stated she died "due to falling from a high area during the Israeli strike on Gaza." Interviews with relatives, news reports and investigations by human rights organizations also suggest that her death indirectly was caused by an Israeli air strike as little as 100 meters away, though accounts differ on how this occurred. Israeli officials have said that the girl's death had nothing to do with Israel.

One day later, Ofir Gendelman, a spokesman for Israeli Prime Minister Benjamin Netanyahu, tweeted a photo of an Israeli woman and her two children ducking a Gaza rocket, describing it as "when a rocket fired by terrorists from Gaza is about to hit their home." When it was proved the photo was from 2009, he said, "I never stated that the photo was current. It illustrates the fear that people in southern Israel live in."

In early November 2012, Israeli activists reported that several journalists with cameras followed a Palestinian girl as she repeatedly tried without success to provoke a violent reaction from Israeli soldiers. On 18 November, Alarab Net, an Arab news site, released a photo of three bloodied children and their mother with the caption "martyred massacred family in Gaza." This image turned out to be of Syrian children. Pro-Palestinian activists published a photograph on Twitter of an injured infant held by a rescue worker, writing that "even this young injured Palestinian child doesn't seem surprised or scared, used to Israeli terrorism." The baby in the picture was quickly identified as an Israeli injured in a Hamas rocket attack, which also killed her mother. The Washington Post reported at the time on the tendency of both sides in the conflict to politicize photos of injured and dead children.

Following the Hamas-led attack on Israel on 7 October 2023, reports surfaced alleging that militants had beheaded Israeli babies in the Kfar Aza kibbutz. These claims, initially circulated by Israeli soldiers and reported by media outlets such as i24NEWS, quickly spread across international media. The story gained further traction after U.S. President Joe Biden referenced having seen photos of beheaded children, though the White House later clarified that he had not seen such images and was referring only to media reports. The Israel Defense Forces stated they could not verify the claims, and subsequently, news networks have denounced these claims. Despite the lack of corroboration, the claim was widely circulated and used to generate international outrage, particularly in Western media and political discourse. Critics argued that the propagation of the story without verification served to intensify public emotions and influence perceptions of the conflict, especially regarding the actions of Hamas and the justification of Israel's military response.

== Peace projects ==
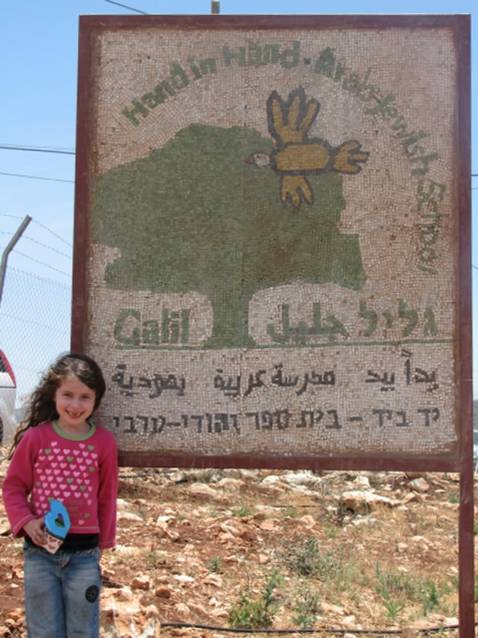
The sign outside Galil Jewish–Arab School

Many Arab–Israeli peace projects actively involve children and teenagers. For example, Seeds of Peace was founded in 1993 with the goal of creating new generations of leaders in conflict regions that will no longer accept outdated and harmful stereotypes about each other. This would occur by bringing together youth from both sides of conflict regions to literally put a human face on those who were previously perceived as an enemy. The organization, which began with Israeli, Palestinian, and Egyptian teenagers, has expanded to reach Jordan, Morocco, Qatar, Tunisia, Afghanistan, Yemen, India, Pakistan, Maine, Cyprus (Turkish Republic of Northern Cyprus/Republic of Cyprus), and the Balkans.

Children of Peace, a charity based in the United Kingdom, is self-described as focused "upon building alliances with like-minded organisations in the Gaza, Israel, Jordan, Lebanon and the West Bank [establishing] projects and programmes in the arts, education, health and sports for Israeli and Palestinian children, aged 4 – 17." Richard Martin, who founded the organization in 2005, has stated that he refuses to take sides because "all children suffer in conflict."

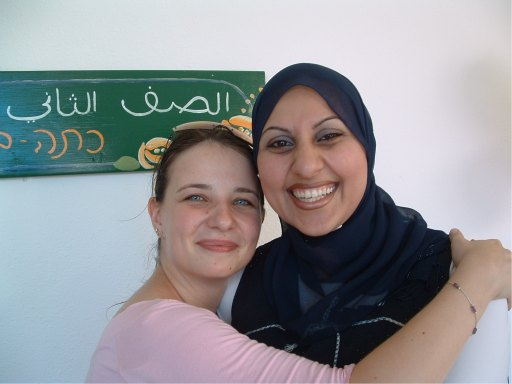
Two Hand in Hand teachers

Middle East Education Through Technology (MEET), the Institute for Circlework, TEC-Center for Technology, Education, and Cultural Diversity, and Hand in Hand focus on educational efforts. Hand in Hand is a network of bilingual (Hebrew-Arabic) schools in which Jewish and Arab children study together. It was founded in 1997 by two Israelis, one Arab and one Jewish, to break negative stereotypes, cultivate mutual respect and understanding, and provide an example that Jews and Arabs can study, work and live together in peace.

Hand in Hand has also hosted basketball games organized by PeacePlayers International (PPI) between Israeli and Palestinian teenagers, describing them as "baby steps" towards peace. Ala Khatib, a co-principal, said that "Never mind what is going on outside, whether it's bombing in Gaza or if it's suicide bombing in Tel Aviv, you can't stop school. You have to go to school, you have to face the other side, you have to say good morning, and you have to talk."

In 2005, the United States-based Kabbalah Center and the Palestinian Abu Assukar Center for Peace and Dialogue organized a children's camp for 115 Israeli children and 115 Palestinian children aged 8 to 12 to take place near Tel Aviv at the Ramat Gan Safari Park. The camp, which lasted for four days, involved children from Bethlehem, Ramallah, East Jerusalem, Tulkarem, Jericho, and Jenin. The Israeli children involved were mostly those who came from severe poverty and violent backgrounds. Joint-organizer Osnat Youdkevitch remarked that, "Our message is that of dignity for all human beings. It's harder for adults to fully understand, since so much has already been built up around us, but kids have the chance to grow up thinking in a healthier way. If you play, eat and sweat for four days with a group of other kids who are supposed to be the 'enemy', it will stay in your heart forever."

Mifalot is an organization founded by the owners of Hapoel Tel Aviv Football Club to promote peaceful coexistence through football. In 2013, a football match was held in Holon, bringing together Palestinian and Israeli teenagers. Fatah activists posted threatening messages on the Internet against the Palestinian boys and girls who participated in the tournament, and Fatah leaders in Ramallah condemned their participation in such events.

== Legal issues ==
In 2010, Palestinian National Authority issued a "Report on the Implementation of the Convention on the Rights of the Child in the Occupied Palestinian Territory", i.e., the West Bank, East Jerusalem and Gaza, and noted the Authority's lack of jurisdiction over these areas and the Israel "closure regime", the "Israeli Wall of Annexation and Expansion" and the many checkpoints Israel has set up within the occupied territories. All make it difficult for Palestinians to stop Israeli violations of the rights of Palestinian children.

=== Convention on the Rights of the Child and Israeli youth law ===
Applicable to Israelis and Palestinians is the Convention on the Rights of the Child, a human rights treaty setting out the civil, political, economic, social, health and cultural rights of children. The Convention defines a child as any human being under the age of eighteen, unless the state itself defines the age of majority as an earlier age. Israel ratified the Convention on the Rights of the Child in 1991. Although Palestine did not have the status of a state, in 1995 Yassir Arafat, as the representative of the Palestine Liberation Organization, signed the Convention. The internationally accepted definition of children, codified in the United Nations Convention on the Rights of the Child (CRC), defines children as individuals under the age of 18. Since 1991, Israel has signed and ratified the CRC and applies the definition to Israeli children. However, in the Occupied Territories, Israel defines as minors only Palestinians who are under the age of 16. Some leaders of the major Palestinian armed groups also state that they consider children of 16 to be adults. According to the 1971 Israeli Youth Law, criminal responsibility is set at 12 years of age and over. The law states that children under that age may not be arrested, and that children older than that age must not be interrogated unless their parents and their lawyer are present. The Israeli human rights monitoring group B'Tselem states that the law does not officially apply to Palestinian children in the Occupied Territories, who are subject to Israeli military law, but that the military court has recommended the provisions should be taken into consideration. According to Gideon Levy, these provisions are ignored in practice. A UNICEF report has stated that, "Ill-treatment of Palestinian children in the Israeli military detention system appears to be widespread, systematic and institutionalized," and that, "In no other country are children systematically tried by juvenile military courts."

== See also ==
- Children in emergencies and conflicts
- Civilian casualties in the Second Intifada
- Effect of the Gaza war on children in the Gaza Strip
- Israeli war crimes
- Human rights in Israel
- Human rights in the State of Palestine
- Human rights violations against Palestinians by Israel
- Indiscriminate attack
- List of Israeli civilian casualties in the Second Intifada
- List of Palestinian civilian casualties in the Second Intifada
- Violence in the Israeli–Palestinian conflict
- Arrest and detention of Palestinian minors by Israel
