= Killing of Khalil al-Mughrabi =

Killing of a Palestinian boy by Israeli Defense Forces

Khalil al-Mughrabi
- Born: c. 1990; Gaza Strip
- Died: 7 July 2001; Rafah
- Cause of death: Shooting

Khalil al-Mughrabi was an 11-year-old Palestinian boy who was killed while resting with friends after a game of soccer in Rafah on 7 July 2001, by shots fired from an Israel Defense Forces (IDF) tank. Two of his companions, aged 10 and 12, were also seriously wounded. This incident took place during the Second Intifada.

The Israeli Army said immediately that their forces had been attacked and that they had returned fire. Palestinian sources and a friend of Khalil said they were part of group throwing stones at Israeli troops when al-Mugrahbi was killed. A later investigation by the chief military prosecutor found that the clashes that had involved Palestinians throwing stones and grenades at Israeli soldiers had broken up at noon, and that al-Mughrabi was killed at 7 P.M, seven hours after the clashes. The investigation found that, later in the evening, Palestinian adults and children had attempted to seal a road with debris and barbed wire, drawing warning shots from an Israeli tank, with one shot evidently killing al-Mughrabi, who had been playing football in a field a half mile away.

Despite having determined that the circumstances "must dictate a military police investigation", the military prosecutor cleared the soldiers of wrongdoing on the grounds of the violence that had taken place earlier in the day. An independent investigation by the Israeli human rights group B'Tselem said that the Israeli army's investigation of the incident amounted to a whitewash, calling the investigation "shallow and superficial" and that the actions by the Judge Advocate General "raises a serious concern that lying is considered legitimate practice in the office of the Judge Advocate General." Human Rights Watch, commenting on the army's failure to investigate the al-Mughrabi case further, noted that in international law, the governing principle where there is credible or prima facie evidence of a possible violation of international humanitarian law is that an investigation is required.

== Incident ==
The incident occurred on 7 July 2001, in the Yubneh refugee camp, located on the outskirts of the city of Rafah, in the southern Gaza Strip near the Egyptian border. At the time a ceasefire agreement, drawn up by George J. Tenet, the American director of the C.I.A., was supposed to have been in effect from the preceding June 13. In the interim 9 Israelis had died, and al-Mughrabi was the 17th Palestinian victim.

The Israeli army reported that Palestinians had thrown 26 grenades and four gasoline bombs at troops in Rafah over the course of the day. The spokesman for the Israeli army said that the troops had fired back following these attacks. In another incident, two Israeli soldiers were lightly injured when a roadside bomb exploded near the village of Asira ash-Shamaliya. The IDF spokesman said "dozens of Palestinians were rioting next to Rafah and endangering the lives of the soldiers... The soldiers acted with restraint and moderation and dispersed the rioters by using means for dispersing demonstrations, and by means of live gunfire into an open area distant from the rioters." A friend of al-Mughrabi reported that the two of them had been among the group of stone throwers at Israeli troops. Palestinian sources he had been throwing stones when he was killed. The army reported that to disperse the attacking crowd, "live gunfire into an open area distant from the rioters" and that the army had no evidence that anyone had been injured.

None of the essential facts in the army's initial account were true. A later internal investigation by the Israeli army determined that no attacks had taken place during the time range that al-Mughrabi was shot and killed. Colonel Einat Ron, the military's chief prosecutor, found that at 7 P.M, when al-Mughrabi had been playing soccer with his friends in a field, no grenades or stones had been thrown at Israeli troops. Nonetheless, Israeli troops opened fire from a heavy tank-mounted machine gun. The report found these shots were in response to an attempt by Palestinians to block a road while an Israeli army vehicle was leaving the town. Soldiers on an Israeli tank fired warning shots at this group. Ron's report determined that these shots violated army regulations due to their having been fired from a long-range heavy weapon and because the shots had been aimed near children. Her report stated that the shots were fired at a time "when no grenades were thrown, and it is doubtful that the force felt its life was in danger." One of the bullets from the tank fire struck al-Mughrabi's head and killed him.

The Israeli report offered three conflicting options. The first was to begin a military investigation into the suspected unlawful fire, the second to clear the soldiers on account of violence that had taken place earlier in the day, and the third to issue disciplinary measures without a criminal investigation. Col. Ron chose the second option, clearing the soldiers of any wrongdoing. In a letter to B'Tselem, Ron stated that "Under the circumstances we did not find that there is suspicion of criminal behavior by soldiers, nor justification for starting a criminal investigation." B'Tselem's research director said of the letter that "it indicates that lying is legitimate in the military prosecutor's office in order to protect the troops."

The report by Ron discussed why it would be difficult to clear the soldiers of wrong-doing. Among the reasons the report gives for why it would be is the "gravity of the deviation" and the "results of the event". The report says that a "serious deviation from obligatory norms of behaviour" occurred. Ron's report stated that "An 11-year-old boy who was innocently playing football was killed", adding that "even if this is a 'slight' deviation, the consequences make it imperative that a military police investigation be conducted", though the letter sent by Ron to B'Tselem said that she did not believe that an investigation was warranted. She provided no reason for the contradicting views expressed.

== B'Tselem investigation ==
B'Tselem, requested that the Israeli army provide information regarding the investigation. Col. Ron sent B'Tselem a letter in which she stated that the circumstances merited no criminal investigation. However, the letter was, apparently inadvertently, accompanied by the military's records of the internal investigation. B'Tselem released the internal documents along with its report on the incident, titled Whitewash: The Office of the Judge Advocate General's Examination of the Death of Khalil al-Mughrabi, 11, on 7 July 2001.

According to B'Tselem's report, twenty to thirty children were playing in the Yubneh Refugee Camp that afternoon. The children reportedly saw an Israeli tank moving towards the Gitrit military encampment around 5PM. al-Mughrabi arrived at the site at 5:30 PM with a friend, 13-year-old Suleiman al-Akhras. The two of them played soccer in the field until 6:45 PM. After the children had finished playing many sat near mounds of sand near the border fence, among them al-Mughrabi. At 7:10 PM, al-Mughrabi was shot in the head.

The children reported that the shots had come from the observation tower of the Gitrit encampment, approximately one kilometer from where the children had been playing. More shots were fired at the children, wounding another two children. Ibrahim Kamel Abu Susin, 10, was shot in the stomach and Suleiman Turki Abu Rijal, 12, was shot in the left leg. al-Mughrabi was evacuated by the civilians who had arrived on the scene. An ambulance took the two wounded children to the hospital.

The following testimonies were collected by B'Tselem:

We divided into a few teams of six and played a few games. About fifteen minutes before we finished playing, an Israeli tank drove along the border. It arrived from Salah a-Din Gate and drove west toward the Tel Zu'arub post, where there is a very tall military tower that overlooks the whole area. After we finished playing, we sat down to rest. Some of us sat alongside the sand piles that are near the border fence. Others sat on the top of the piles. While we were resting, the soldiers in the tower suddenly fired a bullet. We didn't hear it until it entered Khalil's head. Khalil, who was sitting on top of one of the piles, fell down immediately. His head burst and parts of it flew toward the children who were near him.

— Testimony of Suleiman Muhammad Salameh al-Akhras, 13, elementary school pupil, resident of Rafah

On the evening of Saturday (7 July 2009), I was playing with about thirty more children at a soccer field near the border, in Yubneh Refugee Camp. The game started after the afternoon prayer, i.e., around 5:00 P.M. After a while, a tank drove along the border. It came from the east and drove west, toward Tel Zu'arub military tower there. The tank passed by quietly without shooting at us. After we finished playing, we lay on the ground to rest. Some of us sat on the piles of sand near the border. Around 7:10 P.M., I stood up and told the kids to leave the place. I was two meters away from Khalil. Then I heard a faint sound and saw Khalil's brain flying out of his head and splattering all over my face and clothes.

— Testimony of Muhammad Salah Hussein al-Akhras, 14, elementary school pupil, resident of Rafah

Suleiman Abu Rijal had to have his left testicle amputated as a consequence of the thigh wound. The B'Tselem field investigator, Nabil Mukhairez, added that the bullet entered the top of Khalil’s head and came out the bottom, and was fired at a distance of roughly 1 kilometre from the Tel Zu’arub tower.

=== De-briefings by IDF ===
The incident occurred within the military designation zone of the 424 infantry battalion of the 84th "Giv'ati" Infantry Brigade, IDF's 366th (Reserve) Armor Division, Israeli Southern Command.

According to Holi Moshe, Major Operations Directorate Officer of Division 6643 and the Summary of battalion and brigade commanders' de-briefings dated 14 July 2001: "It is impossible to unequivocally determine that the child was killed by our forces' gunfire."

According to the Opinion of the Israeli Southern Command Judge Advocate, Baruch Y. Mani, Lt. Colonel, dated 29 August 2001:

(A) It appears that tank fire was used as warning shots, which the regulations prohibit. The de-briefing itself specifies that the tank fire was a mistake (for reasons unrelated to the regulations). There was no mention of what measures, if any, were taken with regards to this shooting.

(B) The de-briefings mention that warning shots were toward the children. The regulations do stipulate that no warning shots should be fired to get children away from restricted areas on roadsides (section 19 of the Ahuda [sic] Regulation).

(C) It appears that the IDF response given to the press, claiming that there was no use of heavy weapons, was wrong.

Einat Ron, Colonel Israel's Chief Military Prosecutor wrote to B'Tselem stating: "...we have not found any suspicion of criminal behavior on the part of the IDF soldiers, or that there is a just cause to open an investigation."

=== Chris McGreal’s investigation ===
Chris McGreal used the Khalil al-Mughrabi case to illustrate an article which tried to address the phenomenon, widely attested, of many Palestinian children being shot by Israeli snipers over a brief period. Half of the estimated 408 Palestinian minors who had been killed since the second Intifada three years earlier had died in the Gaza Strip, and most of those, according to McGreal, were shot at just two refugee camps, Khan Yunis and at Rafah, where Khalil died. In just ten weeks in 2003 McGreal instanced six similar cases in that area: Haneen Suliaman, an 8 year-old girl, had been killed by an IDF sniper’s headshot while strolling out to buy a packet of crisps; soon after Huda Darwish, a 12 years old girl, was shot in the head while at her desk at school and left blind for life; a boy Abdul Rahman Jadallah, who attended Suliaman's funeral, was then shot under the eye after attending the funeral of a Palestinian fighter the next day - among a group of kids, he stood forth and hung a Palestinian flag on a fence, and was shot in the face; Ali Ghureiz, 7 years old, was shot in the head, below his left eye, outside his house in Rafah; Haneen Abu Sitta, aged 12, was killed while walking home from school near a Jewish settlement fence in southern Gaza; Nada Madhi, aged 12, took a bullet in the stomach and died, after leaning from her bedroom window in Rafah to watch a funeral procession for another child that had just been killed.

Khalil al-Mughrabi’s death, he noted, had been investigated by B'Tselem, whose study documented a discrepancy between the IDF's public pronouncements and what their internal investigations had uncovered. The chief military prosecutor, according to McGreal, covered various false scenarios that might be passed on to B’Tselem. He therefore sought an interview with an IDF source in the area concerned in order to go over all these episodes and find, even if from an anonymous source speaking off the record, an explanation of why these incidents were recurrent under that command. An Israeli officer subsequently did discuss these cases with McGreal and in the end conceded that some degree of fault existed in most of these cases of children being shot. He concluded however that, 'I remember the Holocaust. We have a choice to fight the terrorists or to face being consumed by the flames again.'

== Aftermath ==
Immediately following the shooting of al-Mughrabi, Hamas spokesman Abdel Aziz al-Rantisi was quoted in The Guardian as vowing to send ten suicide bombers against Israel to avenge the Israeli army’s killing of Khalil Mughrabi in Rafah. In an essay on sacred violence, Jan Willem van Henten cited Rantisi's declaration, and argued that, while calls or justifications for acts of revenge often use Islamic religious language, more often than not the real purpose is political, and that the evidence he has examined shows that 'retaliation for Israeli killings of Palestinians is a prime motive for launching suicide attacks celebrated as martyrdom.'

Abdel Razek Majaidie, then head of Palestinian Security in Gaza, called the killing "another crime" by Israel, adding that it violated Israel's declared ceasefire. Al-Mughrabi was the 17th Palestinian killed following a United States brokered truce between the Israelis and Palestinians. Nine Israelis had been killed in that same time period. A panel led by George Mitchell urged Israel to resume military investigations into fatal shootings by soldiers, which had no longer been standard procedure.

B'Tselem, upon releasing the Israeli Army's records of the internal investigation, said that "the military cleared the soldiers who caused the death of an 11-year-old Palestinian boy, covered up the incident, refrained from opening an investigation by the military police, and issued a false statement regarding the circumstances of the death". B'Tselem further stated that the actions by the military prosecutor's office in clearing the soldiers "raise grave concern that cover-ups and falsifications are considered acceptable practice by the Military Advocate General's (prosecutor's) office". B'Tselem spokeswoman said that "We have a very clear feeling that the military is trying to avoid opening an investigation of Palestinian civilians killed by soldiers." The Israeli army responded to the accusations from B'Tselem by saying that the army investigates soldiers accused of violations and that "The fact that legal documents have reached the public is proof that the army is investigating such cases all the time."

On 5 August 2003 one refusnik, Shimri Tzameret, explained to a military court why he had declined to perform his duties in the IDF. His defense consisted in recounting the impact which the B'tselem account of the incident and the following cover-up had made on him.

Early in the following year, Sara Leibovich-Dar wrote of a string of cases like the al-Mughrabi episode where initial IDF reports denying that well-verified incidents ever took place turn out to be false. She cited the southern district prosecutor, Brigadier General Baruch Mani's determination that the army's statement to the press regarding al-Mughrabi, claiming that no heavy weaponry was used, was incorrect.

The prosecutor, Einat Ron, retired from the army. In 2007, she became a judge in the Petah Tikva Magistrate's Court.
