= Derek Summerfield =

South African psychiatrist

Derek Summerfield is an honorary senior lecturer at London's Institute of Psychiatry and a member of the Executive Committee of Transcultural Special Interest Group at the Royal College of Psychiatry. He is also an Honorary Fellow of the Egyptian Psychiatric Association. He has published around 150 papers and has made other contributions in medical and social sciences literature.

== Clinical background ==
Dr. Summerfield was born in South Africa. He qualified in medicine at St Mary's Hospital Medical School in London. During his working career, he has been Principal Psychiatrist with the Medical Foundation for Care of Victims of Torture in London, Honorary Senior Lecturer at St George's Hospital Medical School at the University of London and a consultant to Oxfam on projects in war-affected settings. He was a Research/Teaching Associate for the Refugee Studies Centre at the University of Oxford.

== Research and publications ==
In 1995 he participated in a study on the psychiatric effects of the detention and torture of Palestinian political prisoners. He has been involved with various studies on the effects of war and atrocity, and of displacement and asylum-seeking in Nicaragua, Guatemala, Bosnia and the UK. He has published extensively on the effects of torture as well as the effects of war-related violence on women and children. He drew international attention with a series of publications questioning the existence of post-traumatic stress disorder, criticizing the medicalization of psychotherapy for trauma and the exaggeration of mental illness statistics. Recently he has argued that global mental health statistics should take into account differing ethnopsychiatric definitions.

== Palestinian controversy ==
Summerfield has been a vocal critic of the Israeli Government's actions against Palestinians and of what he believes are Israeli physicians' violations of medical ethics. An October 16, 2004 editorial published by the British Medical Journal, concerning what he described as the level of Israeli violence against Palestinian children generated controversy and a number of responses both negative and positive. He also attempted unsuccessfully to force Yoram Blachar to resign as head of the World Medical Association after spearheading a petition drive claiming Blachar supported torture while he was working in Israel.

== Critical Psychiatry ==
Dr. Summerfield is a member of UK branch of The International Critical Psychiatry Network.
