= Detention of refugee children in Thailand =

Legal overview of immigration detention

Immigration detention of refugee and asylum seeking children in Thailand violates the rights of children under international law. The undocumented migrant children are detained for indefinite and prolonged periods without proper access to legal support. Thailand is key transit route, host and final destination for refugees seeking asylum in southeast Asia and Australia. During the Universal Periodic Review (UPR) session in May 2016, various human rights issues including detention of refugee and asylum seeking children were reported. Currently, there are no effective alternatives to immigration detention and all sectors of population including children are subject to detention.

== Overview ==
=== Arrest and detention of refugees ===
According to the UNHCR, the population of refugees in Thailand as of December 2016, was approximately 102,500 refugees of which 56,000 were children, mostly from Myanmar, Laos, Cambodia, Sri Lanka and Pakistan.

Thailand is not a signatory to the 1951 Refugee Convention and does not have a formal asylum framework incorporated in domestic law. Instead, it relies on ad hoc policies established through Cabinet Resolutions. Refugees and asylum seekers are treated as illegal migrants and lack of legal framework makes refugees vulnerable to arrest, detention, discrimination, deportation and refoulement. Exploitation and abuse of refugees and asylum seekers by Thai authorities are common and there is limited access to justice. Migrants who are arrested and unable to pay bribes are likely to be taken to police lock-ups or Immigration Detention Centres (IDCs).

The UNHCR has raised concerns about the treatment of the asylum seekers, refugees and migrants and status of IDC facilities. The Immigration Act, B.E. 2522 (1979) provides broad discretionary powers to police officers and immigration officials to detain and arrest migrants, including children. The law does not set maximum length of time that a person can remain in immigration detention. Indefinite detention without judicial review amounts to arbitrary detention which is prohibited under international law.

The UNHCR has limited role in Thailand and Thai authorities refuse to recognise "asylum Seeker certificates" issued by UNHCR and restricts protection of refugees, including children from arrest or detention by Thai police.

==== Rohingya refugees ====
Over 100,000 refugees are from Myanmar of which 48,000 are children, make up the 90 percent of refugees in Thailand. Many are stateless Rohingya Muslim minority who fled systemic persecution and discrimination from the Burmese Government. A 2014 report by Human Rights Watch noted Thailand permitted 2,055 Rohingya to enter the country offering temporary protection but later treated them as illegal migrants and detained them in IDC. The government does not allow the office of the UN High Commissioner for Refugees to conduct refugee status determination screenings for ethnic Rohingya from Myanmar.

==== Urban refugees ====
There are 3,801 urban refugees and 4,130 asylum seekers registered with UNHCR in Thailand and 2800 of which are children. As they wait for refugee status determination by the UNHCR many are subject to poor treatment from Thai authorities, such as harsh and unlawful treatment by corrupt authorities and detained in IDCs for prolonged period until they could leave for third country resettlement.

== International obligations ==
Thailand became a member of the United Nations on 16 December 1946 and is party to a number of key human rights treaties. Thailand is a dualist state therefore international law does not automatically bind the government unless it has been incorporated and transformed into domestic law.

=== Convention on the Rights of the Child ===
Convention on the Rights of the Child (CRC) was ratified by Thailand in 1992, which mandates states to take best interests of the child as primary consideration. Article 2(1) provides states to respect and ensure rights of all children and must not be discriminate against based on religion, race, political affiliation or other status.

The CRC further obligates states to:

- ensure survival and development of children.
- prevent separation from parents against their will.
- protect from violence, abuse and neglect.
- ensure special protection for unaccompanied children.
- ensure highest attainable standard of health.
- adequate standard of living for physical, mental, spiritual, moral and social development.
- recognise child's right to play and recreation.
- protect from potential sexual abuse and exploitation.
- not be subjected to torture, cruel, degrading treatment and to be arbitrarily detained.
- use detention and arrest only as last resort, for shortest period.
- prompt legal access, assistance and challenge for children deprived of liberty.

Thailand has a reservation to Article 22, which mandates states to ensure refugee children receive protection and assistance in enjoying their rights and to cooperate with UN organisations to protect and assist reunification of child to the family.

=== International Covenant on Civil and Political Rights ===
Thailand ratified International Covenant on Civil and Political Rights (ICCPR) in 1996. It mandates states to:

- not to subject anyone to torture, cruel, inhumane or degrading treatment.
- protect against arbitrary arrest or detention.
- enable access to court proceedings to anyone deprived of liberty by arrest or detention.
- provide humane conditions of detention.
- protect children as are required by status as a minor, without discrimination to race, colour, sex, language, religion, national or social origin, birth.

The list of issues by the Human Rights Committee in relation to second periodic report of Thailand concerns various issues on Thailand's treatment of aliens and protection of children under articles 2, 7, 9, 10, 13, 24 and 26 of ICCPR. Thailand has responded that it has refrained from deporting the refugees and the period of detention depends on the Refugee Status Determination and resettlement processes conducted by UNHCR.

=== Convention against Torture ===
Thailand ratified Convention against Torture (CAT) in 2007, which obligates states to:

- not to expel, return ("refouler") or extradite a person to another state where there are substantial grounds that the person would be in danger of being subjected to torture.
- prevent acts of cruel, inhumane or degrading treatment or punishment committed by public official.

=== Refugee Convention ===
Thailand is not a signatory and has not accepted the 1951 Refugee Convention in UPR's Recommendation & Voluntary Pledges (Second Review) in September 2016.

== Children in detention facilities ==
Stateless refugee children and asylum seeking children whose refugee claim has been rejected may face indefinite periods in detention with little hope of release or repatriation.

=== Conditions in detention ===
The conditions of IDCs in Thailand is widely reported as substandard. Many live in poor hygiene with outdated facilities, without access to adequate health care and legal support. Children are detained in overcrowded cells, frequently separated from family members, without access to education, nutrition and privacy. A 2016 report by the BBC showed that children were suffering from vomiting and diarrhea due to unclean water. Basic services such as education, recreational activities, medical examination and adequate food are only available in Ministry of Social Development and Human Security (MSDHS) shelters however many choose not to be separated from their children by sending them to shelters and consent to keep their children with them in IDCs. Children are often detained without regard to protection required by their status as minors and often separated from their parents with unrelated adults, giving them greater risk of violation and abuse, including sexual abuse. Current initiatives aimed at removing children from IDCs are limited and often discretionary.

The Ministry of Foreign Affairs has denied that detention of migrant children was result of the Government's policies but rather the preference of migrant parents themselves to keep family unity and logistical difficulties. The Thai Government has also claimed that it has allocated over US$14.58 million to improve IDCs to enhance living conditions and has an order by the Thailand Immigration Bureau guaranteeing individual's rights to sanitation, food, health and respect for religious belief.

=== Impact ===
Many children detained in IDCs have spent prolonged periods and some have spent almost their entire life in detention. Children who do not receive basic necessities for their psychological and physical development can suffer from serious impacts of incarceration.

==== Psychological and physical health ====
Prolonged detention for an indefinite period can cause psychological issues for detainees and this problem is especially grave for children. In a joint report submitted for the Second Periodic Report of Thailand at the 119th session of United Nations Human Rights Committee, it noted many detained children suffer from stress, depression, fear and alienation. In 2017, The Guardian reported this environment can create developmental delays and for some children to self-harm. Mental health has been identified as a major concern for detainees and there are few opportunities for referral for treatment.

==== Lack of access to education ====
Under Thailand's National Education Act 1999, all children have the right to primary education regardless of their nationality or legal status. However children detained in IDCs cannot physically access schools to receive such services.

According to a 2012 Human Rights Watch report, Thailand's Immigration Office permitted the International Organisation for Migration (IOM) to operate a daycare centre for children under 14 years inside Suan Plu IDC. However it was reported that daycare programme does not offer proper education suitable for their age and as a result many have suffered problems such as insomnia, nightmares, bed-wetting, isolation development, attachment disorder and acts of violence.

== Possible reform ==
Thailand is still currently establishing national mechanisms under the framework of the Comprehensive Strategy on Addressing Illegal Migrants of 2012 to be in line with international standards and practices.

Thailand has accepted 187 of 249 of UPR's Recommendations & Voluntary Pledges (Second Review) in September 2016 and has accepted a recommendation to ratify the Optional Protocol to the Convention against Torture. It has also accepted in implementing Protection of Vulnerable Persons Act; improve access to health, education, social welfare for vulnerable groups including refugee children. However Thailand has not accepted key recommendations affecting migrant and refugee children, such as providing access to legal status for asylum seekers and refugees; withdrawing reservations to article 22 of CRC; ratification of 1951 Refugee Convention; complying with ICCPR by putting immediate end to arbitrary detention; prohibiting arbitrary arrest and detention including children.

In 2016, the Bangkok Post noted the decision by Chiang Rai Juvenile and Family Court has marked the first time a child who was recognised as a refugee by UNHCR, was entitled to protections under section 132(1) of Juvenile and Family Court and Juvenile and Family Case Procedure Act B.E. 2553 [2010] which provides counselling services, vocational training and access to education. The decision was made having regard to best interests of the child, regardless of child's immigration status.

UNHCR has advocated for a screening mechanism for undocumented immigrants and refugee children and this has been approved by Thailand’s Cabinet. The framework will assist with identification and protection of refugees.

== See also ==
- Constitution of Thailand
- 2014 interim constitution of Thailand
- Human rights in Thailand
- Immigration detention
- Burmese in Thailand
- Refugee children
- Refugee women and children
- Save the Children
