= Sarah Dryden-Peterson =

Researcher on education in emergencies

Sarah Dryden-Peterson is a researcher on refugee education and a member of the faculty at the Harvard Graduate School of Education where she founded and leads Refugee REACH, an initiative focused on research, education, and action for refugees around the world. Her work has been supported by research grants from various organizations, including the SSHRC, the United Nations High Commissioner for Refugees (UNHCR), Save the Children, and the Andrew Mellon Foundation. Dryden-Peterson served as Co-Chair of the Inter-Agency Network for Education in Emergencies (INEE) Working Group on Education & Fragility. She previously taught in Boston, South Africa, and Madagascar, and founded non-profits in Uganda and South Africa. She teaches courses at Harvard Graduate School of Education on topics related to education in armed conflict, interviewing techniques, comparative education, and community partnerships to support refugees and people experiencing uncertainty.

== Research ==
Dryden-Peterson's research is focused on the connections between education and community development, specifically the role that education plays in building peaceful and participatory societies and seeks to connect practice, policy, and research. Much of her work deals with how to support refugees in preparing for an unknowable future and navigating the associated uncertainty, as well as understanding what school systems and policymakers can do to support refugees. Pedagogies of belonging and future-building are some of the key themes she explores in this vein that she dives into, among others, in her book Right Where We Belong: How Refugees Teachers and Students are Changing the Future of Education. This book is based on over 600 interviews done with refugee teachers and students over 15 years of work in 23 countries.

== Publications ==
=== Books ===
- Dryden-Peterson, Sarah. (2022). Right Where We Belong: How Refugees Teachers and Students are Changing the Future of Education. Harvard University Press. Cambridge, MA.

=== Selected articles ===
- Dryden-Peterson, Sarah. (2021). Moderated Discussion: Pedagogies of Uncertainty as Pedagogies of Belonging. Comparative Education Review, 65(2): 356-374.
- Dryden-Peterson, Sarah. (2020). Civic Education and the Education of Refugee Students. Intercultural Education, 31(5): 592-606.
- Chopra, Vidur, and Sarah Dryden-Peterson. (2020). Borders and Belonging: Syrian youth's experiences of displacement in Lebanon. Globalisation, Societies and Education, 18(4): 449-463. Open Access.
- Dryden-Peterson, Sarah, Elizabeth Adelman, Michelle J. Bellino, and Vidur Chopra. (2019). The Purposes of Refugee Education: Policy and Practice of Integrating Refugees into National Education Systems. Sociology of Education, 92(4), 346-366.
- Dryden-Peterson, Sarah, Negin Dahya, and Elizabeth Adelman. (2017). Pathways to educational success among refugees: Connecting local and global resources. American Educational Research Journal, 54(6), 1011-1047.
- Dryden-Peterson, Sarah. (2017). Refugee Education: Education for an Unknowable Future. Curriculum Inquiry, 47(1), 14-24.
- Dryden-Peterson, Sarah. (2016). Refugee Education: The Crossroads of Globalization. Educational Researcher, 45(9), 473-482.
- Dryden-Peterson, Sarah. (2015). Refugee education in countries of first asylum: Breaking open the black box of pre-resettlement experiences. Theory and Research in Education, 14(2): 131-148. Open Access.

== News articles & podcasts ==
LSE Review of Books, read Sarah Dryden-Peterson’s case for collective responsibility in refugee education

Times Educational Supplement interview with Professor Dryden-Peterson on how best to support refugee children in the classroom

Discussion of Right Where We Belong on the Harvard Graduate School of Education’s EdCast

Dryden-Peterson in conversation with Monisha Bajaj, Editor-in-Chief of the International Journal of Human Rights Education, and Esther Elonga (Stanford University School of Medicine), at an April 2022 online event hosted by San Francisco’s City Lights Bookstore

== Awards ==
- Palmer O. Johnson Award for outstanding article, American Educational Research Association, 2018
- National Academy of Education/Spencer Foundation, Postdoctoral Fellowship, 2015–2017
- Comparative and International Education Society, Joyce Cain Award for distinguished research on African descendants, 2011
- Comparative and International Education Society, Gail P. Kelly Award for outstanding dissertation, Honorable Mention, 2010

== Education ==
Harvard Graduate School of Education 2003-2009 Ed.D., Administration, Planning, and Social Policy; Communities and Schools

Tufts University/Shady Hill School Cooperative 1999-2000 M.A., Education Massachusetts State Teaching Certification (middle and high school)

University of Cape Town, South Africa 1998-1999 M.Phil., History Education, With Distinction (highest honor)

Harvard University B.A., Social Studies with honors, magna cum laude 1993-1997
