= Refugee children =

Displaced children at risk of persecution

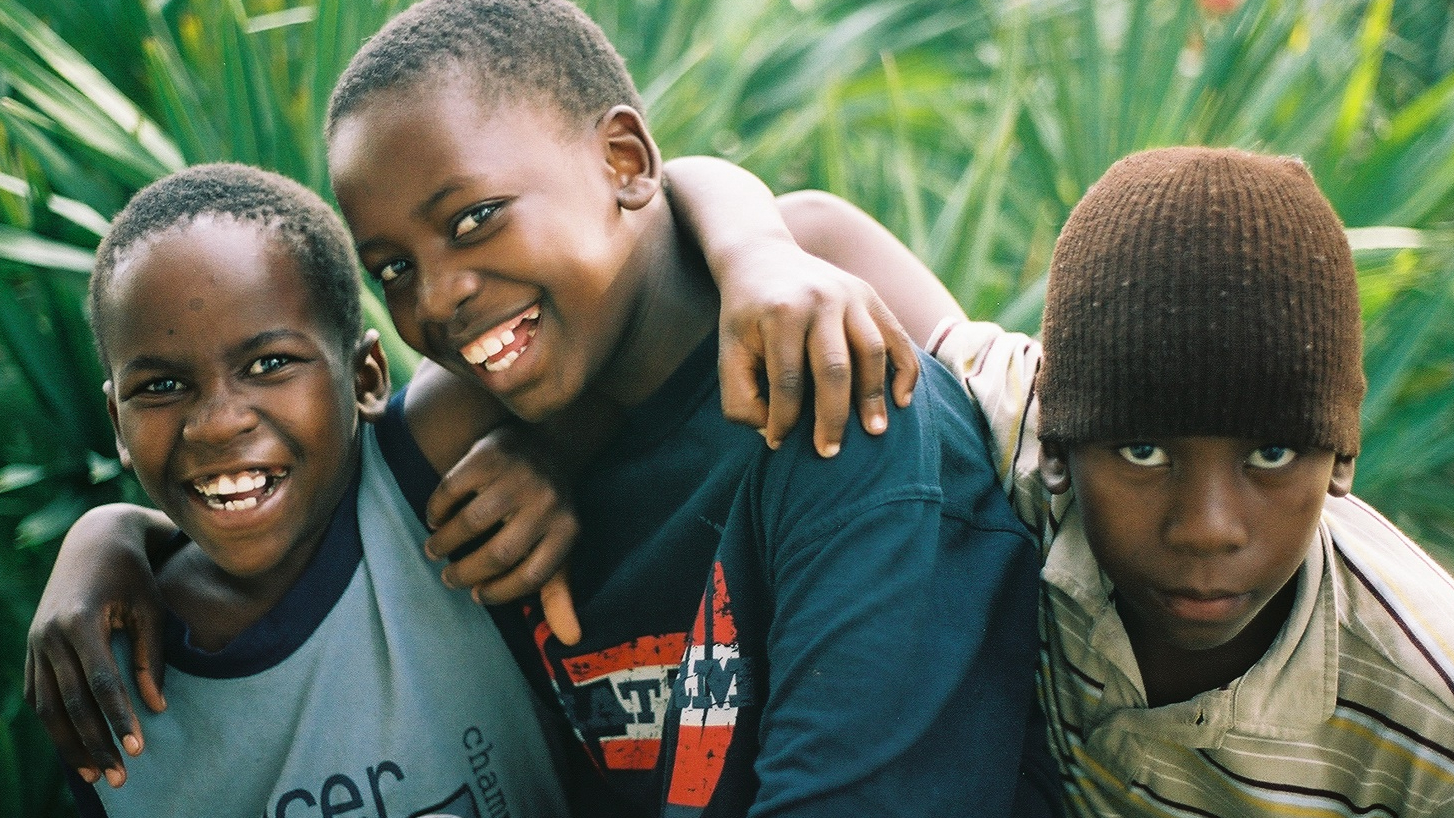
Bantu refugee children from Somalia at a farewell party in Florida before being relocated to other places in the United States

Nearly half of all refugees are children, and almost one in three children living outside their country of birth is a refugee. These numbers encompass children whose refugee status has been formally confirmed, as well as children in refugee-like situations.

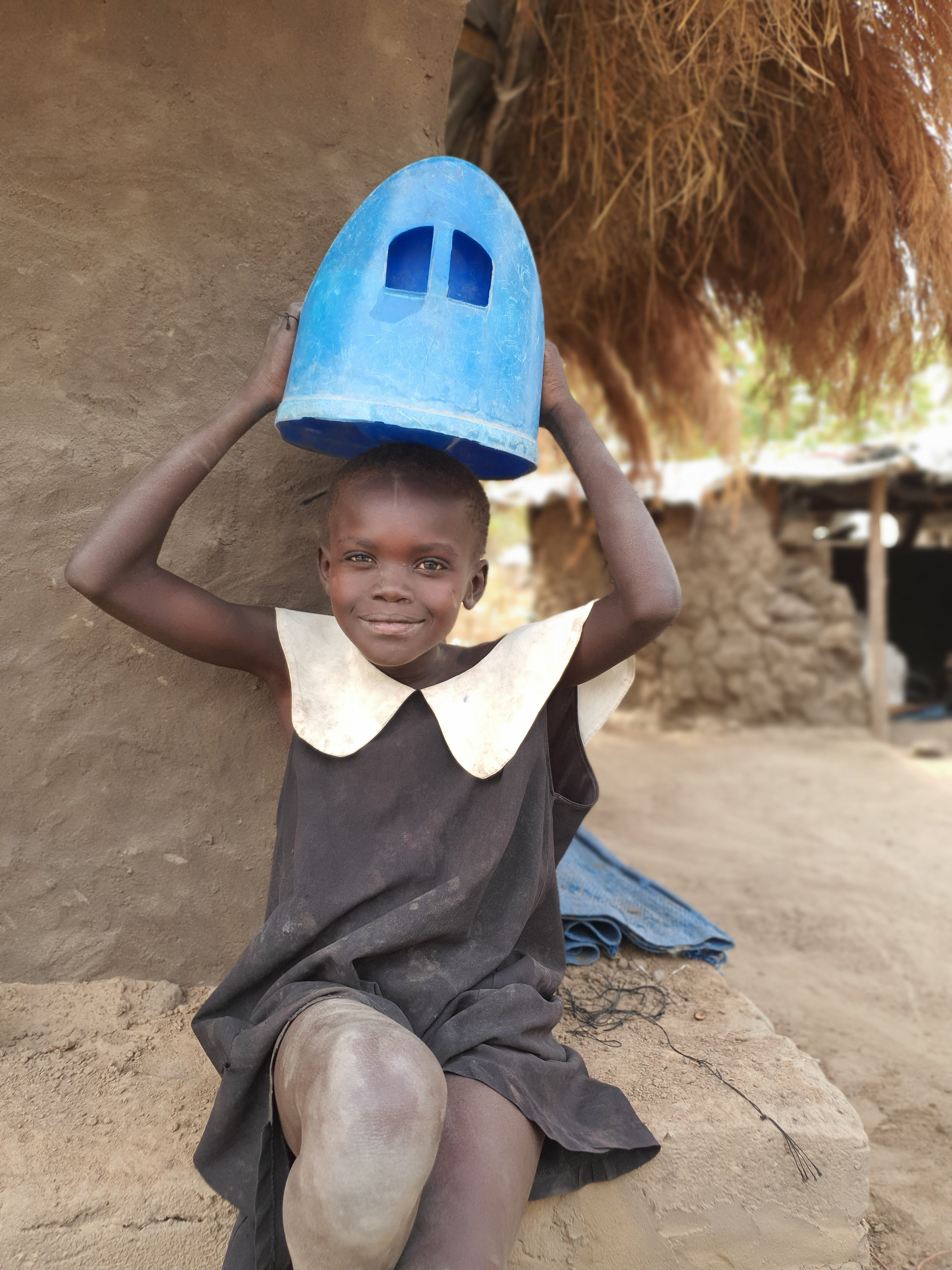
A South Sudanese refugee girl in Rhino camp refugee settlement

In addition to facing the direct threat of violence resulting from conflict, forcibly displaced children also face various health risks, including: disease outbreaks and long-term psychological trauma, inadequate access to water and sanitation, nutritious food, health care [6] and regular vaccination schedules. Refugee children, particularly those without documentation and those who travel alone, are also vulnerable to abuse and exploitation. Although many communities around the world have welcomed them, forcibly displaced children and their families often face discrimination, poverty, and social marginalization in their home, transit, and destination countries. Language barriers and legal barriers in transit and destination countries often bar refugee children and their families from accessing education, healthcare, social protection, and other services. Many countries of destination also lack intercultural supports and policies for social integration. Such threats to safety and well-being are amplified for refugee children with disabilities. Studies done by the U.N. High Commissioner for Refugees show that only half of all refugee children that are elementary school-aged are able to access schooling. Similarly, amongst secondary school-aged children, only 22 percent of children can access schooling. Unfortunately, this culminates in a rate of access to higher education of only one percent amongst all refugees.

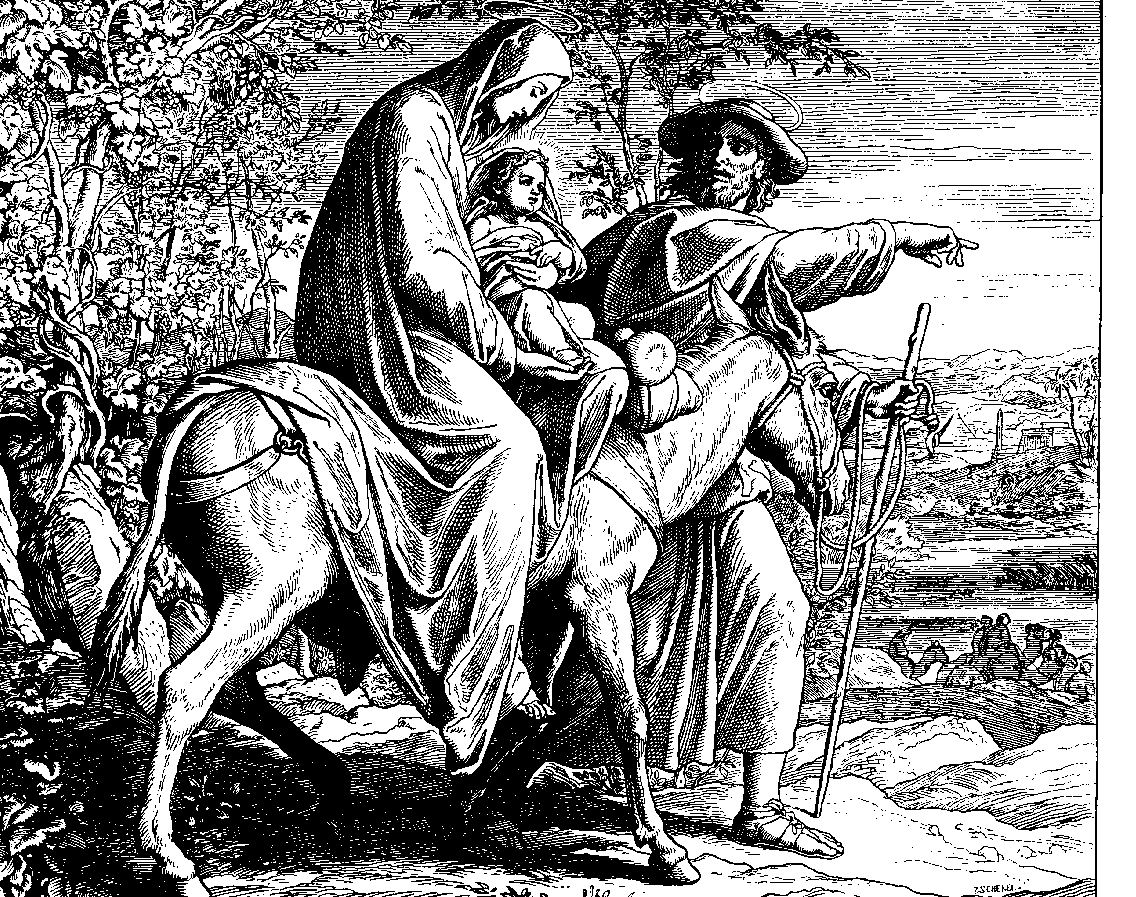
This woodcut by Julius Schnorr von Karolsfeld, 1860 depicts Jesus as a refugee child fleeing the Massacre of the Innocents.

== Legal protection ==
The Convention on the Rights of the Child, the most widely ratified human rights treaty in history, includes four articles that are particularly relevant to children involved in or affected by forced displacement:

- the principle of non-discrimination (Article 2)
- best interests of the child (Article 3)
- right to life and survival and development (Article 6)
- the right to child participation (Article 12)

States Parties to the Convention are obliged to uphold the above articles, regardless of a child's migration status. As of November 2005, a total of 192 countries have become States Parties to the Convention. Somalia and the United States are the only two countries that have not ratified it.

The United Nations 1951 Convention on the Status of Refugees is a comprehensive and rigid legal code regarding the rights of refugees at an international level and it also defines under which conditions a person should be considered as a refugee and thus be given these rights. The Convention provides protection to forcibly displaced persons who have experienced persecution or torture in their home countries. For countries that have ratified it, the Convention often serves as the primary basis for refugee status determination, but some countries also utilize other refugee definitions, thus, have granted refugee status not based exclusively on persecution. For instance, the African Union has agreed on a definition at the 1969 Refugee Convention, that also accommodates people affected by external aggression, occupation, foreign domination, and events seriously disturbing public order. South Africa has granted refugee status to Mozambicans and Zimbabweans following the collapse of their home countries' economies.

Other international legal tools for the protection refugee children include two of the Protocols supplementing the United Nations Convention against Transnational Organized Crime which reference child migration:

- the Protocol to Prevent, Suppress, and Punish Trafficking in Persons, especially Women and Children;
- the Protocol against the Smuggling of Migrants by Land, Sea, and Air.

Additionally the International Convention on the Protection of the Rights of All Migrant Workers and Members of Their Families covers the rights of the children of migrant workers in both regular and irregular situations during the entire migration process.

== Stages of the refugee experience ==
Refugee experiences can be categorized into three stages of migration: home country experiences (pre-migration), transit experiences (transmigration), and host country experiences (post-migration). However, the large majority of refugees do not travel into new host countries, but remain in the transmigration stage, living in refugee camps or urban centres waiting to be able to return home.

=== Home country experiences (pre-migration) ===
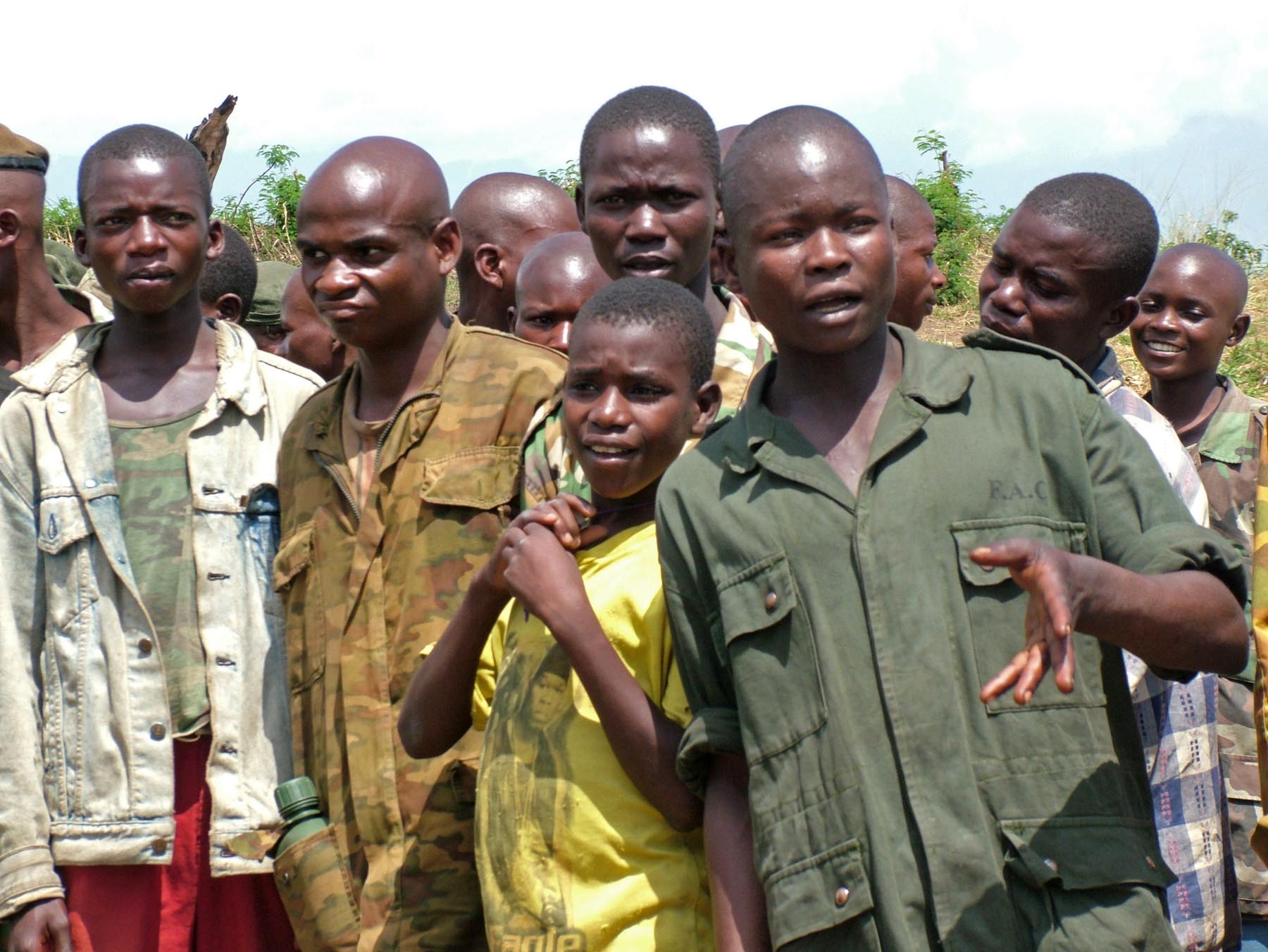
Former child soldiers in the eastern Democratic Republic of the Congo

The pre-migration stage refers to home country experiences leading up to and including the decision to flee. Pre-migration experiences include the challenges and threats children face that drive them to seek refuge in another country. Refugee children migrate, either with their families or unaccompanied, due to fear of persecution on the premise of membership of a particular social group, or due to the threat of forced marriage, forced labor, or conscription into armed forces. Others may leave to escape famine or in order to ensure the safety and security of themselves and their families from the destruction of war or internal conflict. A 2016 report by UNICEF found that, by the end of 2015, five years of open conflict in the Syrian Arab Republic had forced 4.9 million Syrians out of the country, half of which were children. The same report found that, by the end of 2015, more than ten years of armed conflict in Afghanistan had forced 2.7 million Afghans beyond the country's borders; half of the refugees from Afghanistan were children. During times of war, in addition to being exposed to violence, many children are abducted and forced to become soldiers. According to an estimate, 12,000 refugee children have been recruited into armed groups within South Sudan. War itself often becomes a part of the child's identity, making reintegration difficult once he or she is removed from the unstable environment.

Examples of children's pre-migration experiences:

- Some Sudanese refugee children reported that they had either experienced personally or witnessed potentially traumatic events prior to departure from their home country, during attacks by the Sudanese military in Darfur. These events include instances of sexual violence, as well as of individuals being beaten, shot, bound, stabbed, strangled, drowned, and kidnapped.
- Some Burmese refugee children in Australia were found to have undergone severe pre-migration traumas, including the lack of food, water, and shelter, forced separation from family members, murder of family or friends, kidnappings, sexual abuse, and torture.
- In 2014 the President of Honduras testified in front of the United States Congress that more than three-quarters of unaccompanied child migrants from Honduras came from the country's most violent cities. In fact, 58 percent of 404 unaccompanied and separated children interviewed by the UN Refugee Agency, UNHCR, about their journey to the United States indicated that they had been forcibly displaced from their homes because they had either been harmed or were under threat of harm.

In general, children may also cross borders for economic reasons, such as to escape poverty and social deprivation, or some children may do so to join other family members already settled in another State. But it is the involuntary nature of refugees' departure that distinguishes them from other migrant groups who have not undergone forced displacement. Refugees, and even more so their children, are neither psychologically nor pragmatically prepared for the rapid movement and transition resulting from events outside their control. Any direct or witnessed forms of violence and sexual abuse may characterize refugee children's pre-migration experiences.

=== Transit experiences (transmigration) ===
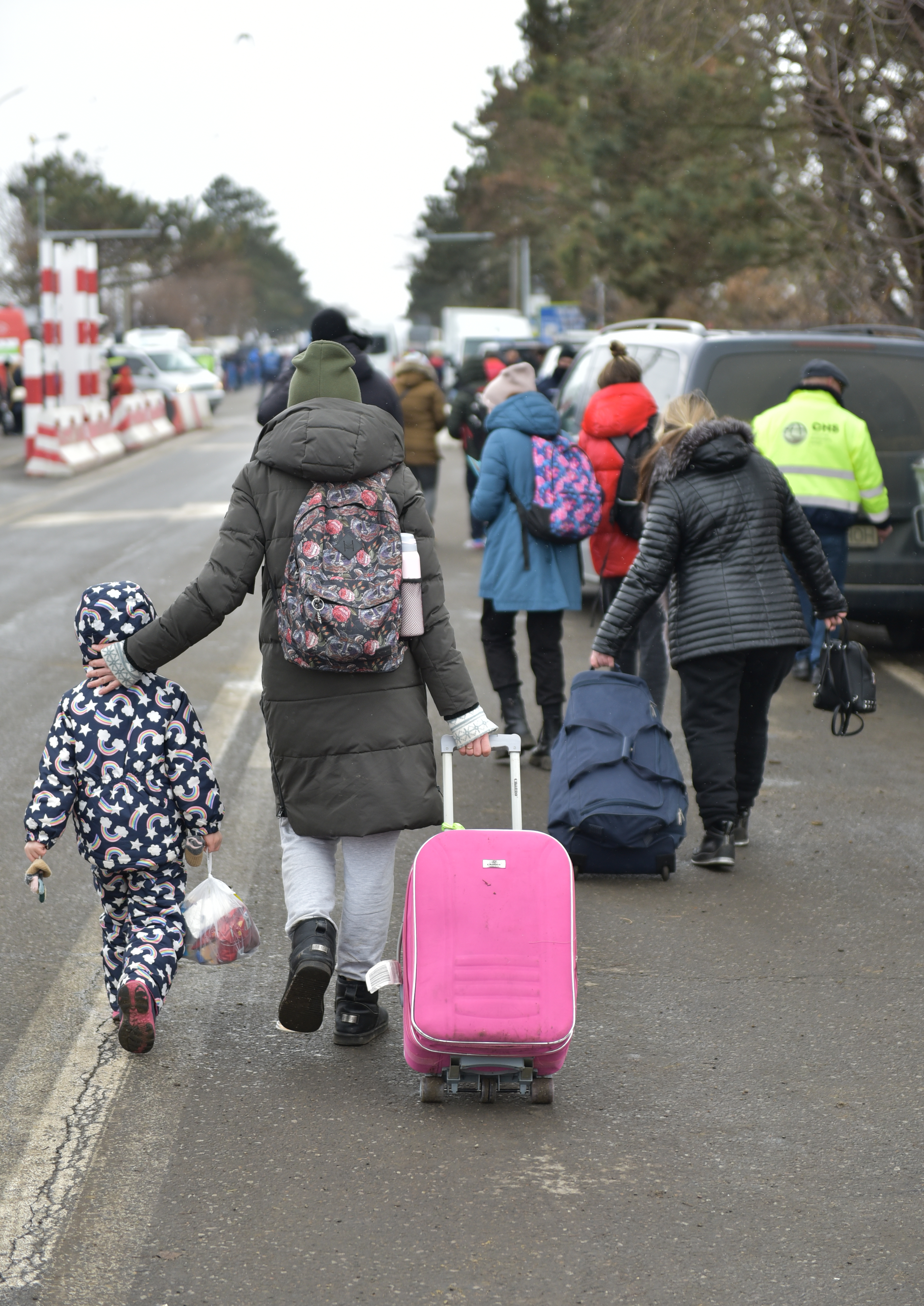
Ukrainian refugees fleeing the Russian invasion of Ukraine, 5 March 2022

The transmigration period is characterized by the physical relocation of refugees. This process includes the journey between home countries and host countries and often involves time spent in a refugee camp. Children may experience arrest, detention, sexual assault, and torture during their translocation to the host country. Children, particularly those who travel on their own or become separated from their families, are likely to face various forms of violence and exploitation throughout the transmigration period. The experience of traveling from one country to another is much more difficult for women and children, because they are more vulnerable to assaults and exploitation by people they encounter at the border and in refugee camps.

==== Trafficking ====
Smuggling, in which a smuggler illegally moves a migrant into another country, is a pervasive issue for children travelling both with and without their families. While fleeing their country of origin, many unaccompanied children end up travelling with traffickers who may attempt to exploit them as workers. Including adults, sex trafficking is more prevalent in Europe and Central Asia, whereas in East Asia, South Asia, and the Pacific labour trafficking is more prevalent.

Many unaccompanied children fleeing from conflict zones in Moldova, Romania, Ukraine, Nigeria, Sierra Leone, China, Afghanistan or Sri Lanka are forced into sexual exploitation. Especially vulnerable groups include girls belonging to single-parent households, unaccompanied children, children from child-headed households, orphans, girls who were street traders, and girls whose mothers were street traders. While refugee boys have been identified as the main victims of exploitation in the labor market, refugee girls aged between 13 and 18 have been the main targets of sexual exploitation. In particular, the number of young Nigerian women and girls brought into Italy for exploitation has been increasing: it was reported that 3,529 Nigerian women, among them underage girls, arrived by sea between January and June 2016. Once they reached Italy, these girls worked under conditions of slavery, for periods typically ranging from three to seven years.

==== Detention ====
Children may be detained in prisons, military facilities, immigration detention centers, welfare centers, or educational facilities. While detained, migrant children are deprived of a range of rights, such as the right to physical and mental health, privacy, education, and leisure. And many countries do not have a legal time limit for detention, leaving some children incarcerated for indeterminate time periods. Some children are even detained together with adults and subjected to a harsher, adult-based treatment and regimen.

In North Africa, children travelling without legal status are frequently subjected to extended periods of immigration detention. Children held in administrative detention in Palestine only receive a limited amount of education, and those held in interrogation centers receive no education at all. In two of the prisons visited by Defense for Children International Palestine, education was found to be limited to two hours a week. It has also been reported that child administrative detainees in Palestine do not receive sufficient food to meet their daily nutritional requirements.

Documented cases of child detention are available for more than 100 countries, ranging from the highest to the lowest income nations. Even so, a growing number of countries, including both Panama and Mexico, prohibit the detention of child migrants. And Yemen has adopted a community-driven approach, using small-group alternative care homes for child refugees and asylum-seekers, as a more age-appropriate way of detention. In the United States unaccompanied children are placed in single purpose non-secure "children's shelters" for immigration violations, rather than in juvenile detention facilities. However, this change has not ended the practice of administrative detention entirely. Although there is commitment by the Council of Europe to work toward ending the detention of children for migration control purposes, asylum-seeking and migrant children and families often undergo detention experiences that conflict with international commitments.

==== Refugee camps ====
Some refugee camps operate at levels below acceptable standards of environmental health; overcrowding and a lack of wastewater networks and sanitation systems are common.

Hardships of a refugee camp may also contribute to symptoms following a refugee child's discharge from a camp. A small number of Cuban refugee children and adolescents, who were detained in a refugee camp, were assessed months after their release, and it was found that 57 percent of the youth exhibited moderate to severe posttraumatic stress disorder (PTSD) symptoms. Unaccompanied girls at refugee camps may also face harassment or assault from camp guards and fellow male refugees. In addition to having poor infrastructure and limited support services, there are a few refugee camps that can present danger to refugee children and families by housing members of armed forces. Also, at a few refugee camps, militia forces may try to recruit and abduct children.

=== Host country experiences (post-migration) ===
The third stage, host country experiences, is the integration of refugees into the social, political, economic, and cultural framework of the host country society. The post-migration period involves adaptation to a new culture and re-defining one's identity and place in the new society. This stress can be exacerbated when the children arrive in the host country and are expected to adapt quickly to a new setting.

It is only a minority of refugees who travel into new host countries and who are allowed to start a new life there. Most refugees are living in refugee camps or urban centres waiting to be able to return home. For those who are starting a new life in a new country there are two options:

==== Seeking asylum ====
Asylum seekers are people who have formally applied for asylum in another country and who are still waiting for a decision on their status. Once they have received a positive response from the host government, they will legally be considered as refugees. Refugees, like citizens of the host country, have the rights to education, health, and social services, whereas asylum seekers do not.

For instance, the majority of refugees and migrants who arrived in Europe in 2015 through mid-2016 were accommodated in overcrowded transit centers and informal settlements, where privacy and access to education and health services were often limited. In some accommodation centers in Germany and Sweden, where asylum seekers stayed until their claims were processed, separate living spaces for women, as well as sex-separated latrines and shower facilities, were unavailable.

Unaccompanied children face particular difficulties throughout the asylum process. They are minors who are separated from their families once they reach the host country, or minors who decide to travel from their home countries to a foreign country without a parent or guardian. More children are traveling alone, with nearly 100,000 unaccompanied children in 2015 filing claims for asylum in 78 countries. Bhabha (2004) argues that it is more challenging for unaccompanied children than adults to gain asylum, as unaccompanied children are usually unable to find appropriate legal representation and stand up for themselves during the application process. In Australia, for instance, unaccompanied children, who usually do not have any kind of legal assistance, must prove beyond any reasonable doubt that they are in need of the country's protection. Many children do not have the necessary documents for legal entry into a host country, often avoiding officials due to fear of being caught and deported to their home countries. Without documented status, unaccompanied children often face challenges in acquiring education and healthcare in many countries. These factors make them particularly vulnerable to hunger, homelessness, and sexual and labor exploitation. Displaced youth, both male and female, are vulnerable to recruitment into armed groups. Unaccompanied children may also resort to dangerous jobs to meet their own survival needs. Some may also engage in criminal activity or drug and alcohol abuse. Girls, to a larger extent than boys, are vulnerable to sexual exploitation and abuse, both of which can have far-reaching effects on their physical and mental health.

==== Refugee resettlement ====
Third country resettlement refers to the transfer of refugees from the country they have fled to another country that is more suitable to their needs and that has agreed to grant them permanent settlement. Currently the number of places available for resettlement is less than the number needed for children for whom resettlement would be most appropriate. Some nations have prioritized children at risk as a category for resettlement:

The United States established its Unaccompanied Refugee Minor Program in 1980 to support unaccompanied children for resettlement. The Office of Refugee Resettlement (ORR) by the Department of Homeland Security currently works with state and local service providers to provide unaccompanied refugee children with resettlement and foster care services. This service is guaranteed to unaccompanied refugee minors until they reach the age of majority or until they are reunited with their families.

Some European nations have established programs to support the resettlement and integration of refugee children. The European countries admitting the most refugee children in 2016 via resettlement were the United Kingdom (2,525 refugee children), Norway (1,930), Sweden (915), and Germany (595). Together, these accounted for 66% of the child resettlement admissions to all of Europe. The United Kingdom also established a new initiative in 2016 to support the resettlement of vulnerable refugee children from the Middle East and North Africa, regardless of family separation status. It was reported in February 2017 that this program has been partially suspended by the government; the program would no longer accept refugee youth with "complex needs", such as those with disabilities, until further notice. Refugee children without caretakers have a greater risk of exhibiting psychiatric symptoms of mental illnesses following traumatic stress. Unaccompanied refugee children display more behavioral problems and emotional distress than refugee children with caretakers. Parental well-being plays a crucial role in enabling resettled refugees to transition into a new society. If a child is separated from his/her caretakers during the process of resettlement, the likelihood that he/she will develop a mental illness increases.

== Health ==
This section covers health throughout the different stages of the refugee experience.

=== Health status ===
==== Nutrition ====
Refugee children arriving in the United States often come from countries with a high prevalence of undernutrition. Nearly half of a sample of refugee children who arrived to the American state of Washington, the majority of which were from Iraq, Somalia, and Burma, were found to have at least one form of malnutrition. In the under five age range refugee children had significantly higher rates of wasting syndrome and stunted growth, as well as a lower prevalence of obesity, in comparison to low-income non-refugee children.

However, some time after they arrived in the United States and Australia, many refugee children demonstrated an increasing rate of overnutrition. An Australian study, assessing the nutritional status of 337 sub-Saharan African children aged between three and 12 years, found that the prevalence rate for overweight amongst refugee children was 18.4%. The prevalence rate of overweight and obesity among refugee children in Rhode Island, increased from 17.3% at initial measurement at first arrival to 35.4% at measurement three years after.

But the nutritional profiles of refugee children also often vary by their country of origin. A study involving Syrian refugee children in Jordanian refugee camps found them to be on average more likely overweight than acutely malnourished. The low prevalence of acute malnutrition among them was attributed, at least partly, to UNICEF's infant and child feeding interventions, as well as to the distribution of food vouchers by the World Food Programme (WFP).

Among newly arrived refugees in Washington state, significantly higher rates of obesity were observed among Iraqi children, whereas higher rates of stunting were found among Burmese and Somali children. The latter also had higher rates of wasting. Such variation in the nutrition profiles of refugee children may be explained by the variance in refugees' location and time in transition.

==== Communicable diseases ====
Communicable diseases are a pervasive issue faced by refugee children in camps and other temporary settlements. Governments and organizations are working to address a number of them, such as measles, rubella, diarrhea, and cholera. Scabies is one of the most frequently observed medical conditions affecting children in refugee camps, mainly due to over-crowding and medicine shortages. Refugee children often arrive in the United States from countries with a high prevalence of infectious disease.

Measles has been a major cause of child deaths in refugee camps and among internally displaced people; measles also exacerbates malnutrition and vitamin A deficiency. Some countries, such as Kenya, have developed preventive, detective, and curative programs to specifically target measles within the refugee children population. Kenya has reached over 20 million children with a measles and rubella immunization campaign carried out at the national level in May 2016. In 2017 the Kenya Ministry of Health even reported a routine vaccination coverage of 95 percent in the Dadaab refugee camp. As of April 2017, in response to the first confirmed cases of measles in the camp, UNICEF and UNHCR have collaborated with the Kenya Ministry of Health to swiftly implement an integrated measles vaccination program in Dadaab. The campaign, which has been targeting children aged six to 14 years, also includes screening, treatment referrals for cases of malnutrition, vitamin A supplementation, and deworming.

Diarrhea, acute watery diarrhea, and cholera can also put children's lives at risk. Countries, such as Bangladesh, have identified the introduction and development of proper sanitation habits and facilities as potential solutions to these medical conditions. A 2008 study comparing refugee camps in Bangladesh reported that camps with sanitation facilities had cholera rates of 16%, whereas camps without such facilities had cholera rates that were almost three times higher. In a single week in 2017, 5,011 cases of diarrhea in refugee camps in Cox's Bazar in Bangladesh were reported. In response, UNICEF started a year-long cholera vaccination campaign in October 2017, targeting all children in the camps. At health centers in the refugee camps, UNICEF has been screening for potential cholera cases and providing oral rehydration salts. Community-based health workers are also going around the camps to share information on the risks of acute watery diarrhea, the cholera vaccination campaign, and the importance and necessity of good hygiene practices.

==== Noncommunicable diseases ====
During all points of the refugee experience, refugee children are often at risk of developing several noncommunicable diseases and conditions, such as lead poisoning, obesity, type 2 diabetes, and pediatric cancer.

Many refugee children come to their host countries with elevated blood lead levels; others encounter lead hazards once they have resettled. A study published in January 2013 found that the blood lead levels of refugee children who had just arrived to the state of New Hampshire were more than twice as likely to be above 10 μg/dL as the blood lead levels of children born in the United States. Evidence from the Centers for Disease Control and Prevention (CDC) in the United States also found that nearly 30% of 242 refugee children in New Hampshire developed elevated blood lead levels within three to six months of their arrival to the United States, even though their levels were not found to be elevated at initial screening. A more recent study reported that refugee children in Massachusetts were 12 times more likely to have blood lead levels over 20 μg/dL a year after an initial screening than non-refugee children of the same age and living in the same communities.

A study analyzing the medical records of former refugees residing in Rochester, New York, between 1980 and 2012 demonstrated that former child refugees may be at increased risk of obesity, type 2 diabetes, and hypertension following resettlement.

Many Afghan children lack access to urban diagnosis centers in Pakistan; those who do have access have been found to have various types of cancer. It is also estimated that, within Turkey's Syrian refugee population, 60 to 100 children are diagnosed with cancer each year. Overall, the incidence rate of pediatric cancers among Turkey's Syrian refugee population was similar to that of Turkish children. The study additionally noted, however, that most refugee children affected by cancer were diagnosed when the tumor was already at an advanced stage. This could indicate that refugee children and their families often face obstacles such as poor prognoses, language barriers, financial problems, and social problems in adapting to a new setting.

==== Mental health and illness ====
Traditionally, the mental health of children experiencing conflict is understood in terms of either post-traumatic stress disorder (PTSD) or toxic stress. Prolonged and constant exposure to stress and uncertainty, characteristic of a war environment may result in toxic stress that children express with a change in behavior that may include anxiety, self-harm, aggressiveness or suicide. A 2017 study conducted in Syria by Save the Children determined that 84% of all adults and most children considered ongoing bombing and shelling to be the main psychological stressor, while 89% said that children were more fearful as the war progressed, and 80% said that children had become more aggressive. These stressors are leading causes of the symptoms described above, which lead to diagnosis of PTSD and toxic stress, among other mental conditions. These issues may then be further exacerbated by a forced migration to a foreign country, and the beginning of the process of refugee status determination. A review of refugee children in high-income countries showed PTSD prevalence ranging 19–54%, with an average prevalence of 36%.

Refugee children are extremely vulnerable during migration and resettlement, and may experience long-term pathological effects, due to "disrupted development time". Psychoanalysts of refugee health have proposed that refugee children experience mourning for their culture and countries, despite the fact that the war-torn state of their homes is unsafe. This sudden loss of familiarity places children at a greater risk for mental dysfunction. In addition, studies have shown that refugee children show a higher vulnerability to stress when separated from their families. Studies from treatment facilities and small community samples have confirmed that refugee youth are at higher risk for psychopathologic disorders, including post-traumatic stress disorder, depression, conduct disorder, and problems resulting from substance abuse. Refugee children living in high-income countries have a prevalence of depression of 3–30%, with an average prevalence of 18%. However, other large-scale community surveys have found that the rate of psychiatric disorder among immigrant youth is not higher than that of native-born children. Nonetheless, experiments have shown that these adverse outcomes can be prevented through adequate protective factors, such as social support and intimacy. Additionally, effective adaptation strategies, such as absorption in work and creation of pseudofamilies, have led to successful coping in refugees. Many refugee populations, particularly Southeast Asian, undergo a secondary migration to larger communities of kinfolk from their countries of origin, which serve as social support networks for refugees. Research has shown that family reunification, formation of new social groups, community groups, and social services and professional support have contributed to successful resettlement of refugees.

Refugees can be stigmatized if they encounter mental health deficiencies prior to and during their resettlement into a new society. Differences between parental and host country values can create a rift between the refugee child and his/her new society. Less exposure to stigmatization lowers the risk of refugee children developing PTSD.

=== Access to healthcare ===
Cognitive and structural barriers make it difficult to determine the medical service utilization rates and patterns of refugee children. A better understanding of these barriers will help improve mental healthcare access for refugee children and their families. It is important for children to access healthcare for the following reasons: Early interventions and treatments, Prevention of Childhood illnesses, Health tracking.

==== Cognitive and emotional barriers ====
Many refugees develop a mistrust of authority figures due to repressive governments in their country of origin. Fear of authority and a lack of awareness regarding mental health issues prevent refugee children and their families from seeking medical help. Certain cultures use informal support systems and self-care strategies to cope with their mental illnesses, rather than rely upon biomedicine. Language and cultural differences also complicate a refugee's understanding of mental illness and available healthcare.

Other factors that delay refugees from seeking medical help are:

- Fear of discrimination and stigmatization
- Denial of mental illness as defined in the Western context
- Fear of the unknown consequences following diagnosis such as deportation, separation from family, and losing children
- Mistrust of Western biomedicine

==== Language barriers ====
A broad spectrum of translation services are available to all refugees, but only a small number of those services are government-sponsored. Community health organizations provide a majority of translation services, but there are a shortage of funds and available programs. Since children and adolescents have a greater capacity to adopt their host country's language and cultural practices, they are often used as linguistic intermediaries between service providers and their parents. This may result in increased tension in family dynamics where culturally sensitive roles are reversed. Traditional family dynamics in refugee families disturbed by cultural adaptation tend to destabilize important cultural norms, which can create a rift between parent and child. These difficulties cause an increase of depression, anxiety and other mental health concerns in culturally-adapted adolescent refugees.

Relying on other family members or community members has equally problematic results where relatives and community members unintentionally exclude or include details relevant to comprehensive care. Healthcare practitioners are also hesitant to rely on members of the community because it is breaches confidentiality. A third party present also reduces the willingness of refugees to trust their healthcare practitioners and disclose information. Patients may receive a different translator for each of their follow-up appointments with their mental healthcare providers, which means that refugees need to recount their story via multiple interpreters, further compromising confidentiality.

==== Culturally competent care ====
Culturally competent care exists when healthcare providers have received specialized training that helps them to identify the actual and potential cultural factors informing their interactions with refugee patients. Culturally competent care tends to prioritize the social and cultural determinants contributing to health, but the traditional Western biomedical model of care often fails to acknowledge these determinants.

To provide culturally competent care to refugees, mental healthcare providers should demonstrate some understanding of the patient's background, and a sensitive commitment to relevant cultural manners (for example: privacy, gender dynamics, religious customs, and lack of language skills). The willingness of refugees to access mental healthcare services rests on the degree of cultural sensitivity within the structure of their service provider.

The protective influence exercised by adult refugees on their child and adolescent dependents makes it unlikely that young adult-accompanied refugees will access mental healthcare services. Only 10–30 percent of youth in the general population, with a need for mental healthcare services, are currently accessing care. Adolescent ethnic minorities are less likely to access mental healthcare services than youth in the dominant cultural group.

Parents, caretakers and teachers are more likely to report an adolescent's need for help, and seek help resources, than the adolescent. Unaccompanied refugee minors are less likely to access mental healthcare services than their accompanied counterparts. Internalizing complaints (such as depression and anxiety) are prevalent forms of psychological distress among refugee children and adolescents.

==== Other obstacles ====
Additional structural deterrents for refugees:

- Complicated insurance policies based on refugee status (e.g. Government Assistant Refugees vs. Non-), resulting in hidden costs for refugee patients According to the United States Office of Refugee Resettlement, an insurance called refugee Medical Assistance is available in the short term (up to 8 months), while other such as Medicaid and CHIP are available for several years.
- Lack of transportation
- A lack of public awareness and access to information about available resources
- An unfamiliarity with the host country's healthcare system, amplified by a shortage of government or community intervention in settlement services

Structural deterrents for healthcare professionals:

- Heightened instances of mental health complications in refugee populations
- A lack of documented medical history, which makes comprehensive care difficult
- Time constraints: medical appointments are restricted to a small window of opportunity, making it difficult to connect and provide mental healthcare for refugees
- Complicated insurance plans, resulting in a delay in compensation for the healthcare provider

=== Health education ===
The World Association of Girl Guides and Girl Scouts (WAGGGS) and Family Health International (FHI) have designed and piloted a peer-centered education program for adolescent refugee girls in Uganda, Zambia, and Egypt. The goal of the program was to reach young women who were interested in being informed about reproductive health issues. The program was split into three age-specific groups: girls aged seven to 10 learned about bodily changes and anatomy; girls aged 11 to 14 learned about sexually transmitted diseases; girls aged 15 and older focused on tips to ensure a healthy pregnancy and to properly care for a baby. According to qualitative surveys, increased self-esteem and greater use of health services among the program's participants were the largest benefits of the program.

== Education ==
Education shifts with the different stages of the refugee experience. The report, "Missing Out: Refugee Education in Crisis", compares UNHCR sources and statistics on refugee education with data on school enrollment around the world provided by UNESCO, the United Nations Educational, Scientific, and Cultural Organization. The report notes that, globally, 91 percent of children attend primary school. For all refugees, that figure is at 61 percent. Specifically in low-income countries, less than 50 percent of refugees are able to attend primary school. As refugee children get older, school enrollment rates drop: only 23 percent of refugee adolescents are enrolled in secondary school, versus the global figure of 84 percent. In low-income countries, nine percent of refugees are able to go to secondary school. Across the world, enrollment in tertiary education stands at 36 percent. For refugees, the percentage remains at one percent. In 2016, at the General Assembly Summit for Refugees and Migrants, the UNHCR called "for a broad partnership between government humanitarian agencies, development partners and the private sector to address the huge gaps in the provision of quality education for all refugees". Following this summit, the UNHCR met with companies, governments and philanthropists at the 2016 World Humanitarian Summit in Turkey to create the "Education Cannot Wait fund, an initiative to meet the educational needs of millions children and youth affected by crises around the world". Even though there have been global discussions, the UNHCR still believes there needs to be more action taken to fully address this issue at a global level.

Adapting to a new school environment is a major undertaking for refugee children who arrive in a new country or refugee camp. Education is crucial for the sufficient psychosocial adjustment and cognitive growth of refugee children. Due to these circumstances, it is important that educators consider the needs, obstacles, and successful educational pathways for children refugees.

Graham, Minhas, and Paxton (2016) note in their study that parents' misunderstandings about educational styles, teachers' low expectations and stereotyping tendencies, bullying and racial discrimination, pre-migration and post-migration trauma, and forced detention can all be risk factors for learning problems in refugee children. They also note that high academic and life ambition, parents' involvement in education, a supportive home and school environment, teachers' understanding of linguistic and cultural heritage, and healthy peer relationships can all contribute to a refugee child's success in school. While the initial purpose of refugee education was to prepare students to return to their home countries, now the focus of American refugee education is on integration.

In the United States, there is very little policy governing refugee students and their integration into schools. Most policies and policy debate is focused on immigration and asylum itself. This "invisibility of refugees" in government policy is a serious hindrance to the status and stability of refugees in society; it also impacts their access to education and their ability to succeed in their host country. Education services for refugees and immigrants in the United States are inadequate. A recent study revealed that 54% of refugee children in the United States suffer academic problems. With poor educational support, refugees and immigrants have little social, economic, and political power and are unable to self-advocate. Academic and social education is integral for enhancing their power because it provides them with tools such as language and communication skills and understanding of their host society.

=== Access to education ===
==== Structure of the education system ====
Schools in North America lack the necessary resources for supporting refugee children, particularly in negotiating their academic experience and in addressing the diverse learning needs of refugee children. Complex schooling policies that vary by classroom, building and district, and procedures that require written communication or parent involvement intimidate the parents of refugee children. Educators in North America typically guess the grade in which refugee children should be placed because there is not a standard test or formal interview process required of refugee children.

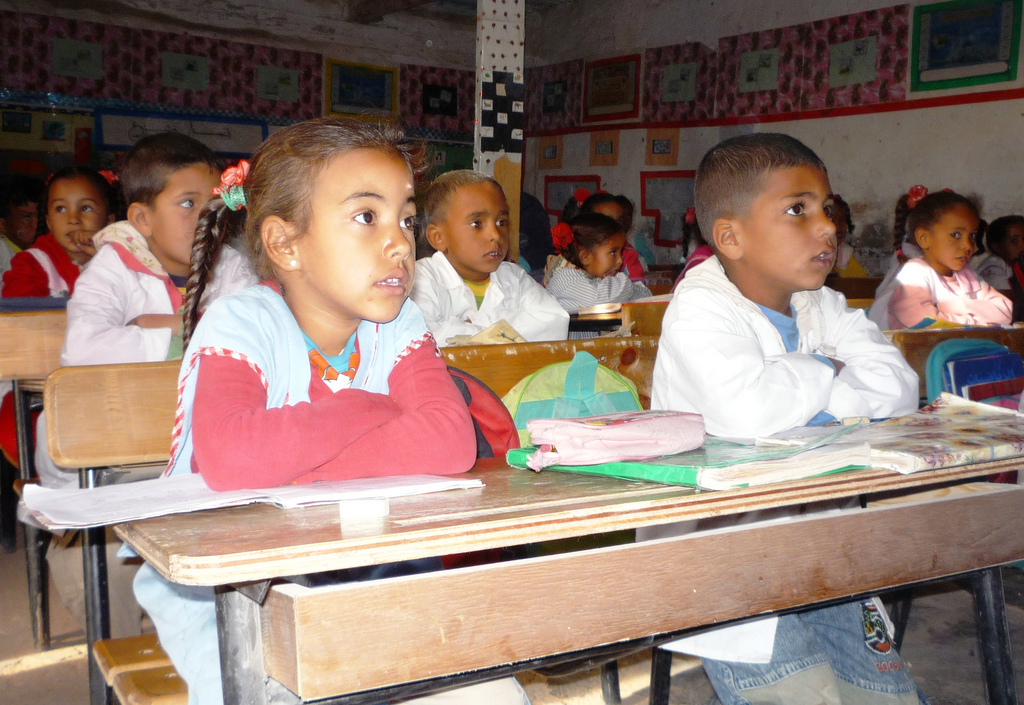
Sahrawi refugee children learning Arabic and Spanish, math, reading and writing, and science subjects

The ability to enroll in school and continue one's studies in developing countries is limited and uneven across regions and settings of displacement, particularly for young girls and at the secondary levels. The availability of sufficient classrooms and teachers is low and many discriminatory policies and practices prohibit refugee children from attending school. Educational policies promoting age-caps can also be harmful to refugee children.

Many refugee children face legal restrictions to schooling, even in countries of first asylum. This is the case especially for countries that have not signed the 1951 Refugee Convention or its 1967 Protocol. The 1951 Convention and 1967 Protocol both emphasize the right to education for refugees, articulating the definition of refugeehood in international contexts. Nevertheless, refugee students have one of the lowest rates of access to education. The UNHCR reported in 2014 that about 50 percent of refugee children had access to education compared to children globally at 93 percent. The UNHCR discusses how refugee education can help reduce child marriage, child labour, exploitative and dangerous work and teen pregnancy. However, since only half of refugees have access to education in comparison to children globally, refugee children's needs and achievements remain largely unmet and invisible. The lack of access to education for refugees, according to the UNHCR, treats education as a "luxury" and not the "necessity" that it is. In countries where they lack official refugee status, refugee children are unable to enroll in national schools. In Kuala Lumpur, Malaysia, unregistered refugee children described being hesitant to go to school, due to risk of encountering legal authorities at school or while on the way to and from school.

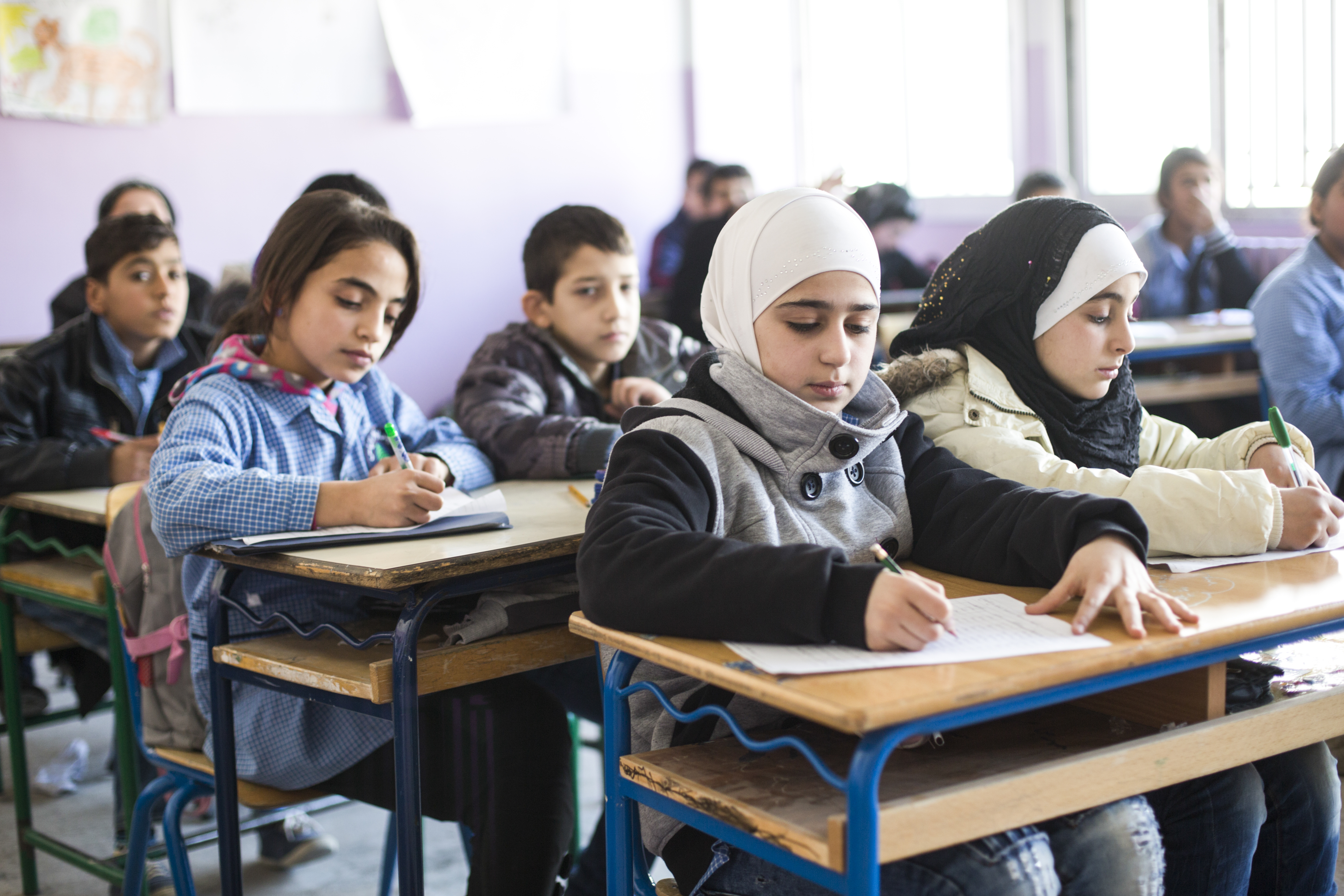
Syrian refugee students attend a school in Lebanon.

If refugee education programs exist they are weak in impact because they lack structure. The United Nations High Commissioner for Refugees (UNHCR) stresses the importance of including refugee education in national and city planning, in order to attain consistency in funding and curriculum. There need to be policies and programs in place to help refugees and immigrant children. Refugee children experience so many changes and hardships, including disruptions in their schooling; schools need to be a grounding and stable place for them, otherwise they will not learn to their best potential. Schools need to help students navigate everyday life in a foreign place. Schools are also protection for refugee and immigrant children who are particularly vulnerable to trafficking and other forms of violence and forced labor due to a lack of knowledge of their host societies.

==== Structure of classes ====
Student-teacher ratios are very high in most refugee schools, and in some countries, these ratios are nearly twice the UNCHR guideline of 40:1. Although global policies and standards for refugee settings endorse child-centered teaching methods that promote student participation, teacher-centered instruction often predominates in refugee classrooms. Teachers lecture for the majority of the time, offering few opportunities for students to ask questions or engage in creative thinking. In eight refugee-serving schools in Kenya, for example, lecturing was the primary mode of instruction.

In order to address the lack of attention to refugee education in national school systems, the UNHCR developed formal relationships with twenty national ministries of education in 2016 to oversee the political commitment to refugee education at the nation-state level. The UNCHR introduced an adaptive global strategy for refugee education with the aim of "integration of refugee learners within national system where possible and appropriate and as guided by ongoing consultation with refugees".

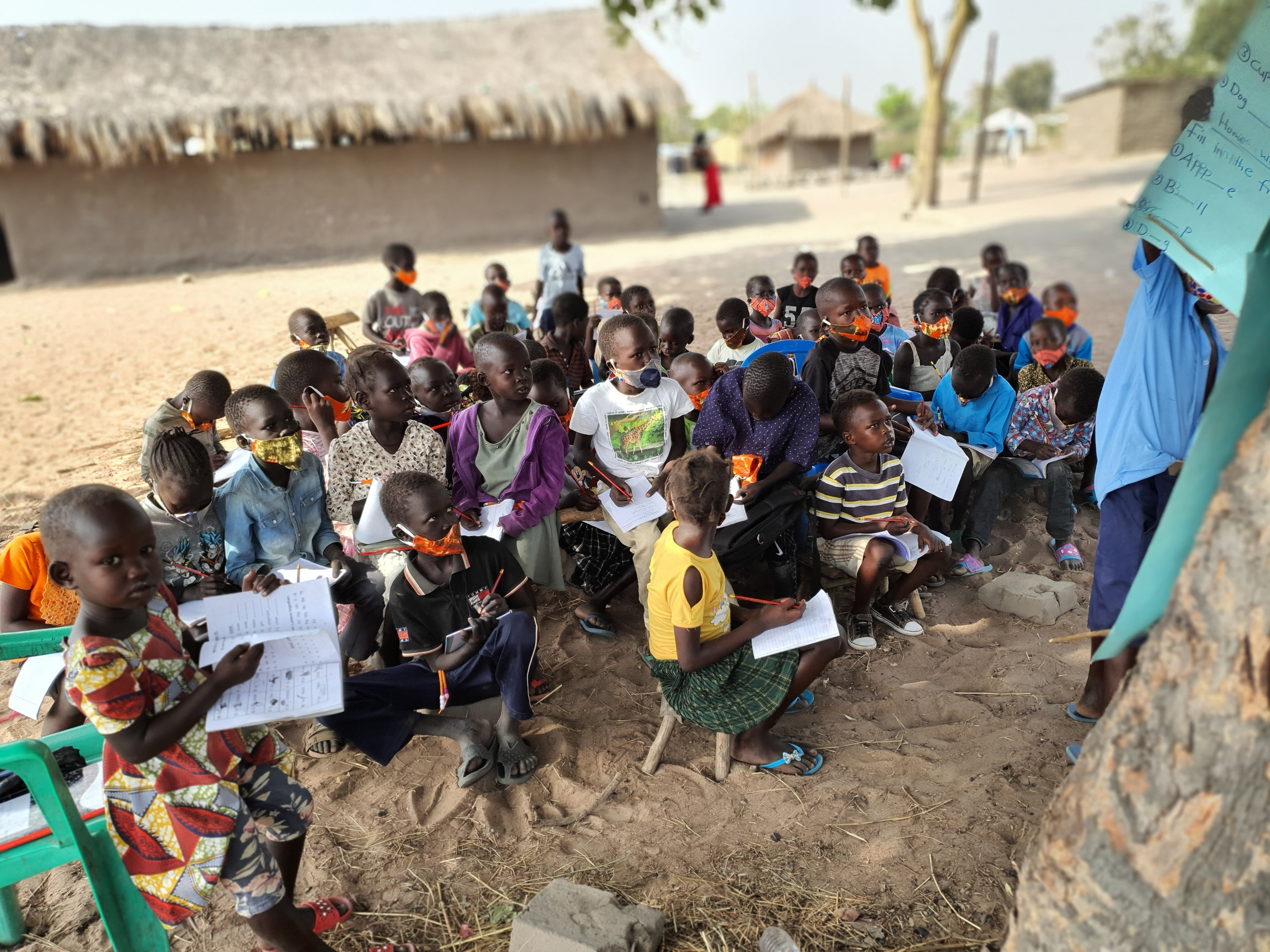
Refugee children in Rhino camp refugee settlement studying under a tree

==== Residence ====
A large number of refugee and immigrant students do not live with their parents but live with extended family or older siblings. If they do live with their parents, their parents are constantly working. This puts a burden on refugee children to be more self sufficient in their everyday life, as well as in their schooling, where they face classroom and homework challenges on their own. They often are also tasked with burdens not faced by other students, such as translating for their family members and helping fill in government forms and filing taxes. This added responsibility interferes with their focus on their school work.

Where refugees live also affects their quality of school and resources available. Refugee children who live in large urban centers in North America have a higher rate of success at school, particularly because their families have greater access to additional social services that can help address their specific needs. Families who are unable to move to urban centers are at a disadvantage. Children with unpredictable migration trajectories suffer most from a lack of schooling because of a lack of uniform schooling in each of their destinations before settling.

==== Language barriers and ethnicity ====
Acculturation stress occurs in North America when families expect refugee youth to remain loyal to ethnic values while mastering the host culture in school and social activities. In response to this demand, children may over-identify with their host culture, their culture of origin, or become marginalized from both. Insufficient communication due to language and cultural barriers may evoke a sense of alienation or "being the other" in a new society. The clash between cultural values of the family and popular culture in mainstream Western society leads to the alienation of refugee children from their home culture.

Many Western schools do not address diversity among ethnic groups from the same nation or provide resources for specific needs of different cultures (such as including halal food in the school menu). Without successfully negotiating cultural differences in the classroom, refugee children experience social exclusion in their new host culture. The presence of racial and ethnic discrimination can have an adverse effect on the well-being of certain groups of children and lead to a reduction in their overall school performance. For instance, cultural differences place Vietnamese refugee youth at a higher risk of pursuing disruptive behaviour. Contemporary Vietnamese American adolescents are prone to greater uncertainties, self-doubts and emotional difficulties than other American adolescents. Vietnamese children are less likely to say they have much to be proud of, that they like themselves as they are, that they have many good qualities, and that they feel socially accepted.

Classes for refugees, more often than not, are taught in the host-country language. Refugees in the same classroom may also speak several different languages, requiring multiple interpretations; this can slow the pace of overall instruction. Refugees from the Democratic Republic of Congo living in Uganda, for example, had to transition from French to English. Some of these children were placed in lower-level classes due to their lack of English proficiency. Many older children therefore had to repeat lower-level classes, even if they had already mastered the content. Using the language of one ethnic group as the instructional language may threaten the identity of a minority group.

Refugee students are also subject to bullying due to language barriers when attending public schools in their host countries. Bullying is commonly around refugee students' inability to speak the host language perfectly. This type of bullying discourages refugee students to continue learning the language and undermines their confidence in their academic abilities.

The content of the curriculum can also act as a form of discrimination against refugee children involved in the education systems of first asylum countries. Curricula often seem foreign and difficult to understand to refugees who are attending national schools alongside host-country nationals. For instance, in Kakuma refugee camp in Kenya, children described having a hard time understanding concepts that lacked relevance to their lived experiences, especially concepts related to Kenyan history and geography. Similarly, in Uganda, refugee children from the Democratic Republic of Congo studying together with Ugandan children in government schools did not have opportunities in the curriculum to learn the history of their home country. The teaching of one-sided narratives, such as during history lessons, can also threaten the identity of students belonging to minority groups.

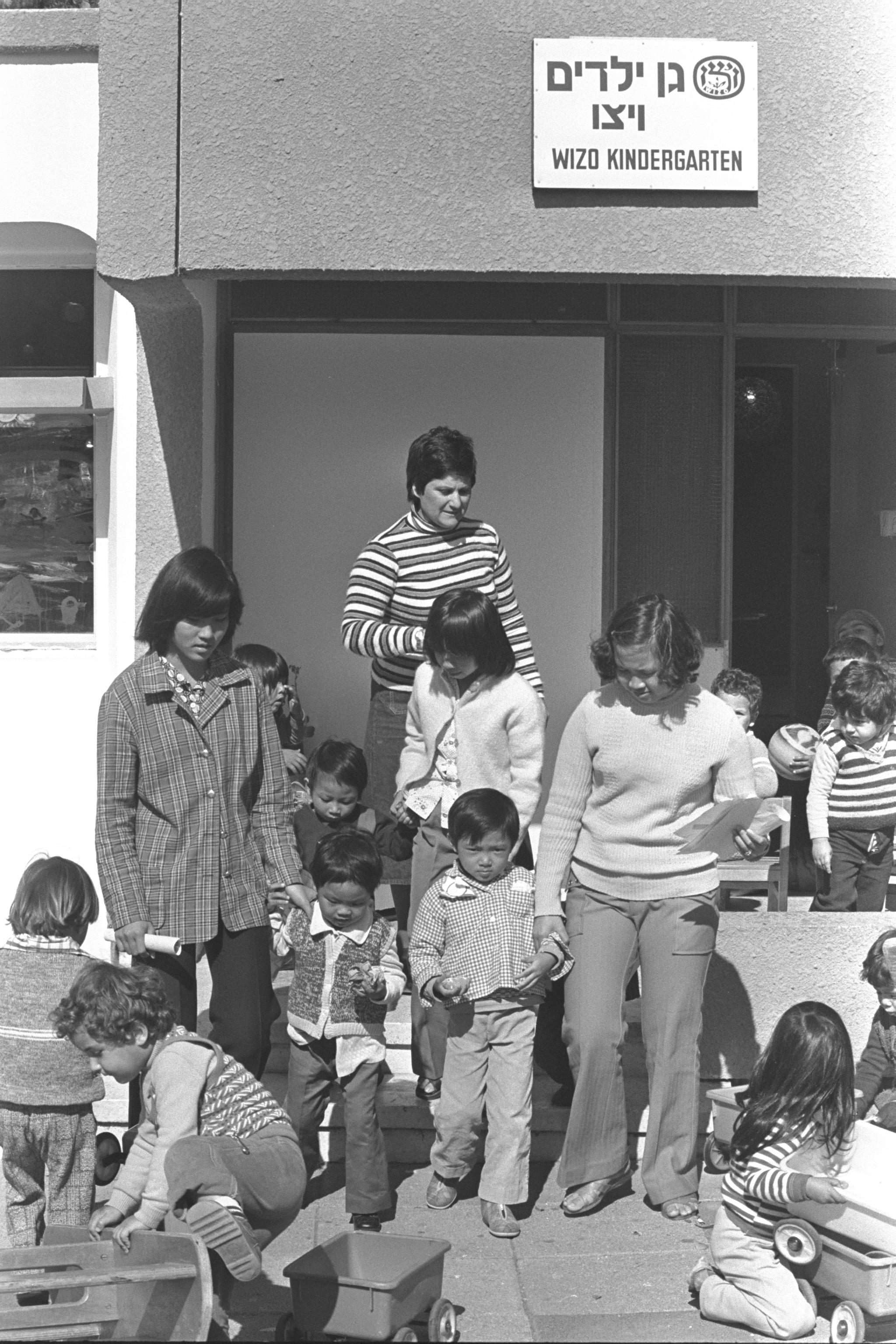
Vietnamese refugee mother and children at a kindergarten in upper Afula, 1979

==== Other obstacles ====
Although high-quality education helps refugee children feel safe in the present and enable them to be productive in the future, some do not find success in school. Other obstacles may include:

- Disrupted schooling – refugee children may experience disruptive schooling in their country of origin, or they may receive no form of education at all. It is extremely difficult for a student with no previous education to enter a school full of educated children.
- Trauma – can impede the ability to learn and cause fear of people in positions of authority (such as teachers and principals)
- School drop outs – due to self-perceptions of academic ability, antisocial behaviour, rejection from peers and/or a lack of educational preparation prior to entering the host-country school. School drop outs may also be caused by unsafe school conditions, poverty, etc.
- Parents – when parental involvement and support are lacking, a child's academic success decreases substantially. Refugee parents are often unable to help their children with homework due to language barriers. Parents often do not understand the concept of parent-teacher meetings and/or never expect to be a part of their child's education due to pre-existing cultural beliefs.
- Assimilation – a refugee child's attempt to quickly assimilate into the culture of their school can cause alienation from their parents and country of origin and create barriers and tension between the parent and child.
- Social and individual rejection – hostile discrimination can cause additional trauma when refugee children and treated cruelly by their peers
- Identity confusion
- Behavioral issues – caused by the adjustment issues and survival behaviours learned in refugee camps

=== Role of teachers ===
North American schools are agents of acculturation, helping refugee children integrate into Western society. Successful educators help children process trauma they may have experienced in their country of origin while supporting their academic adjustment. Refugee children benefit from established and encouraged communication between student and teacher, and also between different students in the classroom. Familiarity with sign language and basic ESL strategies improves communication between teachers and refugee children. Also, non-refugee peers need access to literature that helps educate them on their refugee classmates experiences. Course materials should be appropriate for the specific learning needs of refugee children and provide for a wide range of skills in order to give refugee children strong academic support.

Educators should spend time with refugee families discussing previous experiences of the child in order to place the refugee child in the correct grade level and to provide any necessary accommodations School policies, expectations, and parent's rights should be translated into the parent's native language since many parents do not speak English proficiently. Educators need to understand the multiple demands placed on parents (such as work and family care) and be prepared to offer flexibility in meeting times with these families.

Teachers in the United States often have little experience with the trauma that refugees often face. They also lack training on how to treat students who have experienced trauma. They often see refugee students as burdens and their different cultures and languages as barriers not assets to their education. This type of treatment of refugee students that diminish their capabilities have grave consequences such as negative developmental outcomes.

A booklet published in 2000 written by Dr. Sheila and Dr. Dick detailed the ways teachers can approach refugee children in school as well as the common problems refugee children present with at school. According to the booklet, refugees can come from traumatizing situations and thus may struggle with school attendance, literacy, and their cultural identity. The problems are said to present themselves as anger, withdrawal, issues with authority, concentration, rules, and other inappropriate behavior. The booklet suggests that teachers address those issues by helping children manage their behavior and emotions. According to Sheila and Dick, teachers can do so by knowing what the children need, being supportive, and turning them to specialists if need be.

The study focuses on how teachers can educate themselves on their students' situations. One study encourages teachers to be aware of common behavioral problems that refugee children may exhibit in the classroom like anger, withdrawal, rule testing, problems with authority, inability to concentrate, inappropriate behavior, lower academic achievement. The study also notes how refugee children often exhibit this behavior because they are put into a different cultural context, face discrimination, live with families in low socioeconomic circumstances, have no family, and/or have conflicts with their traditional cultural beliefs. The International Network of Public Schools is a model that can be emulated by schools serving immigrant students or English language learners. These schools prepare teachers specifically for working with refugee and immigrant students. In one example, Strekalova explains that the "most frequent stressful events Croatian refugee children have experienced prior to coming to the United States include: "loss of home (80%), loss of personal belongings (66.7%), separation from family members (66.7%), damage to property (48.9%), exposure to enemy attacks (46.7%), and death of a family member or friend (37.8%). Experiences such as these heavily shape a student's learning ability and educational needs. Teachers must be equipped with not only increased training to address students facing these issues, but the ability to increase student participation in their instruction and allow for the classroom assimilation of students with limited backgrounds in formal education According to the study, teachers who understand these barriers refugee children face and thus the inappropriate behavior they may exhibit can help their students have a more positive school experience.

A book published in 2022 written by Dr. Sarah Dryden-Peterson, titled Right Where We Belong: How Refugee Teachers and Students are Changing the Future of Education, explores the contributions of refugee teachers and students and what they are doing to support themselves and their communities around the world. It is based on over 600 interviews with teachers and students over 15 years of work in 23 countries.

==== Academic adjustment of refugee children ====
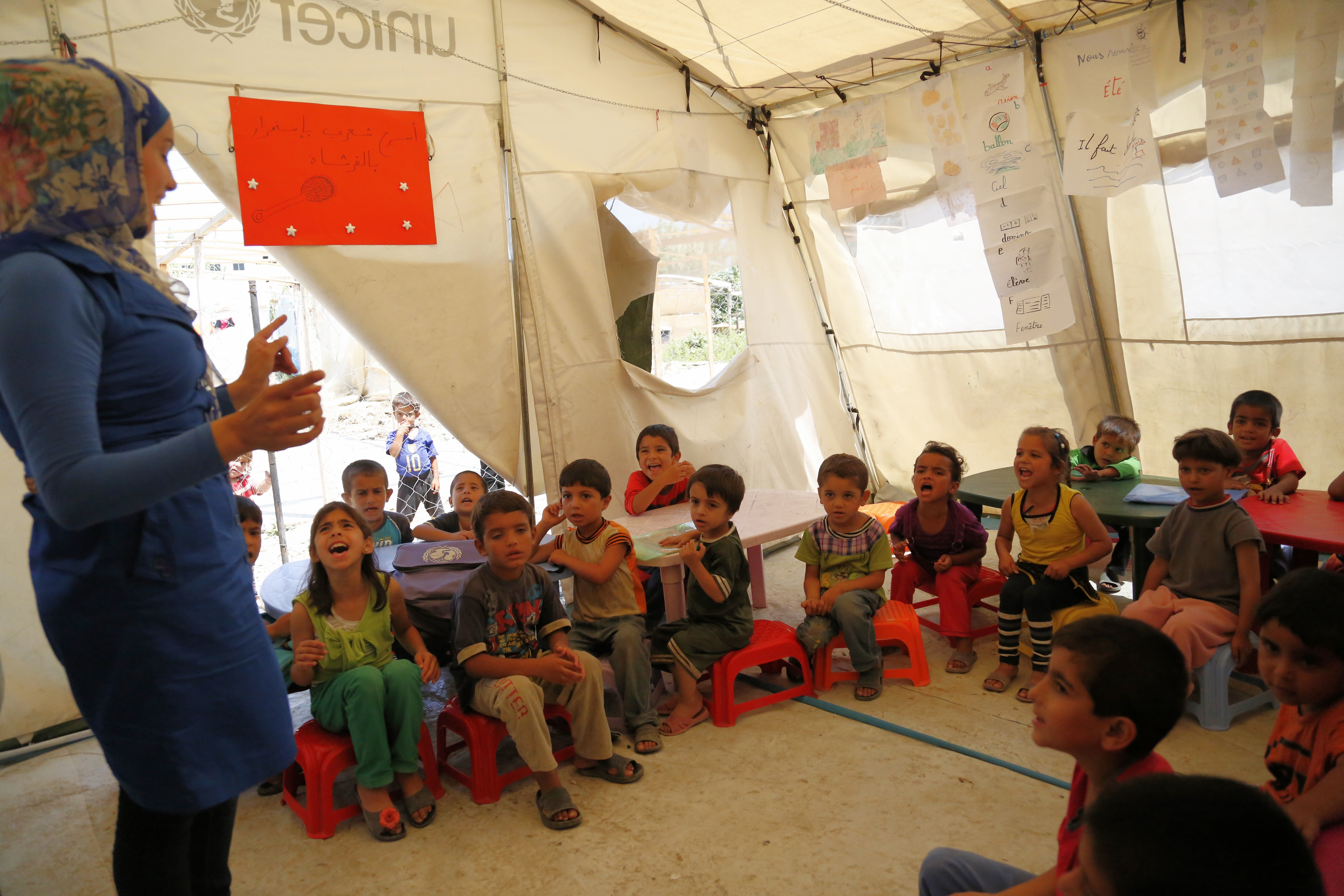
Syrian refugee children attend a lesson in a UNICEF temporary classroom in northern Lebanon, July 2014.

Teachers can make the transition to a new school easier for refugee children by providing interpreters. Schools meet the psychosocial needs of children affected by war or displacement through programs that provide children with avenues for emotional expression, personal support, and opportunities to enhance their understanding of their past experience. Refugee children benefit from a case-by-case approach to learning, because every child has had a different experience during their resettlement. Communities where the refugee populations are bigger should work with the schools to initiate after school, summer school, or weekend clubs that give the children more opportunities to adjust to their new educational setting.

Bicultural integration is the most effective mode of acculturation for refugee adolescents in North America. The staff of the school must understand students in a community context and respect cultural differences. Parental support, refugee peer support, and welcoming refugee youth centers are successful in keeping refugee children in school for longer periods of time. Education about the refugee experience in North America also helps teachers relate better with refugee children and understand the traumas and issues a refugee child may have experienced.

Refugee children thrive in classroom environments where all students are valued. A sense of belonging, as well as ability to flourish and become part of the new host society, are factors predicting the well-being of refugee children in academics. Increased school involvement and social interaction with other students help refugee children combat depression and/or other underlying mental health concerns that emerge during the post-migration period.

The teaching style of the International High School of Laguardia Community College in Long Island City, New York, a school for English language learners such as immigrants and refugees, exemplifies the current research done in this area. This high school has not only been extremely successful in teaching these students, but the students of this high school have noteworthy success rates after graduating. The study analyzing this program demonstrates that this success was achieved by addressing the specific needs of immigrant students, supporting their English language learning through providing them with more personalized instruction, adapting the curriculum to be culturally relevant, and creating an environment of inter-student collaboration.

A 2016 study conducted by Dr. Thomas found that education helps refugee children feel socially included within their new culture. For example, Dr. Thomas noted that education often provided a sense of stability as well as support in developing language, cultural, and technical skills.

=== Debates on assimilation ===
Many refugees who arrive in countries that house large numbers of refugees must choose between refugee-specific schools or general public schools in their host country. Refugee-specific schools are usually created by refugees in the area and do not teach the host language. These schools do not focus on integrating students into public schools or into their host society. These schools are also not regulated and do not provide good quality education. However, many refugees prefer to attend these schools as opposed to public schools because they feel more respected and supported. Many public schools are not equipped to properly teach refugee students. Not only are their teachers not trained to teach refugee children, the curriculum ostracizes refugee students. For example in Turkey, public schools only teach in Turkish with no support for those who do not speak Turkish. This makes it extremely difficult for Syrian refugees, who only speak Arabic, to integrate, learn and assimilate in Turkish schools. In the U.S the majority of public schools have English as Second Learner (ESL) programs, to help non-native English speakers catch up to their classmates. ESL programs often lack rigorous curriculum that challenges students and one study points out that ESL teachers are not equipped to understand and care about students. Teachers who do want to support their students in a holistic way often lack support and resources from the school. ESL programs are also often subject to lack of stability in teachers and curriculum which hinders students' learning.

A 2005 study by Yu Xie and Emily Greenman posited that assimilation and integration of refugee children positively impacts their education and development and that in non-poverty neighborhoods, assimilation is positively correlated with their academic achievement and mental well-being. However, the degree and kind of assimilation varies, as demonstrated by Alejandro Portes and Min Zhou's theory of segmented assimilation. According to Xie and Greenman, that theory posits three paths to assimilation in the United States. The first theory, related to the theory of classical assimilation, is of increasing integration into the American middle class. In contrast, the second theory is of assimilation into the urban underclass, which according to Xie and Greenman leads to poverty and downward mobility. The third theory of selective acculturation highlights conserving the culture of the immigrant community paired with economic integration. With additive assimilation strategy, cultural ties are kept while refugee children continue integrating economically and in their educational institutions. According to Xie and Greenman, legacies of institutionalized racism and xenophobia can be exacerbated by the first and second methods suggested by Portes and Zhou. The first method, classical assimilation theory, relies heavily on the premise that Americanization is inherently good.

Studies performed by Koyama and Chang in Arizona show that refugee students benefit from programs which appreciate, rather than seek to eradicate, their cultural and ethnic backgrounds, forging ties between their identities and new experiences. Classical assimilation negatively impacts refugee education by making assimilation more difficult from the start, in addition to perpetuating prejudice and ethnic discrimination. By exalting American identity as the standard, classical assimilation perpetuates racial hierarchies and stereotypes. The second method, acculturation and assimilation into the urban underclass, is even more susceptible to exacerbating institutionalized racism and legacies of xenophobia. Acculturation and assimilation into the urban underclass refers to assimilation into disadvantaged and impoverished communities within the United States, furthering the cycle of poverty and struggle that many refugees are seeking to escape in the first place. This second method is again an example of legacies of racism and xenophobia, as it preys upon the historic marginalization of ethnic minority communities in the United States. Additionally, public education in the United States for the urban underclass faces a variety of issues independent of refugee education programs – the second method of assimilation results in refugees assimilating to communities that are historically underserved educationally, even without taking into account the various barriers and negative impacts of poorly run refugee education programs.

The International Network of Public Schools have established schools in the United States that are specific for refugee students but also provide a framework where students will eventually be integrated in the public school systems and in society in a way that values their culture and background. They do this by having small classes to offer personalized learning for each refugee student. They also offer a holistic support system for students by having dedicated teams of 5–6 teachers, counselors, and advisors assigned to support students. These teams meet regularly to discuss how they can support students with the challenges they are facing. Refugee students are also supported in learning English so they can begin assimilating into their host societies.

=== Peace education ===
Implemented by UNICEF from 2012 to 2016 and funded by the Government of the Netherlands, Peacebuilding, Education, and Advocacy (PBEA) was an education program that aimed to improve peacebuilding. The PBEA program in Kenya's Dadaab refugee camp aimed to strengthen resilience and social cohesion in the camp, as well as between refugees and the host community. The initiative was composed of two parts: the Peace Education Programme (PEP), an in-school program taught in Dadaab's primary schools, and the Sports for Development and Peace (SDP) program for refugee adolescents and youth. There was anecdotal evidence of increased levels of social cohesion from participation in PEP and potential resilience from participation in SDP.

Peace education for refugee children may also have limitations and its share of opponents. Although peace education from past programs involving non-refugee populations reported to have had positive effects, studies have found that the attitudes of parents and teachers can also have a strong influence on students' internalization of peace values. Teachers from Cyprus also resisted a peace education program initiated by the government. Another study found that, while teachers supported the prospect of reconciliation, ideological and practical concerns made them uncertain about the effective implementation of a peace education program.

=== Pedagogical Approaches ===
Refugees fall into a unique situation where the nation-state may not adequately address their educational needs, and the international relief system is tasked with the role of a "pseudo-state" in developing a curriculum and pedagogical approach. Critical pedagogical approaches to refugee education address the phenomenon of alienation that migrant students face in schools outside of their home countries, where the positioning of English language teachers and their students create power dynamics emphasizing the inadequacies of foreign-language speakers, intensified by the use of compensatory programs to cater to 'at-risk' students. In order to adequately address state-less migrant populations, curricula has to be relevant to the experiences of transnational youth. One way to incorporate the experiences of transnational youth in the classroom is through what scholars have described as Narrative and Constructive Education. In Narrative and Constructive Education, teachers are often themselves immigrants and they share their own personal experience to "connect and inspire their students". This teaching method has proved to be effective in a case study of schools that are part of Ednovate, a charter school management company located in Southern California that contains a majority ethnic immigrant and first-generation population. When students "interact with teachers that come from a similar background, their interest in schooling increases". This type of instruction can help motivate refugee children to advance their education as they are able to identify with their authoritative figures. Another pedagogical approach that can be incorporated is an inclusive language approach. In 2005, Arnot and Pinson's study discussed the "ethos of inclusion" as an important characteristic of schools that have refugee students. This classroom approach provided "intensive language and learning support... used visual resources to provide information" and developed "a student-centred, inclusive curriculum which is designed to provide a learning environment and structure suitable for a whole range of students". Pedagogical researchers and policy makers can benefit from lessons learned through participatory action research in refugee camps, where student cited decreased self-esteem associated with a lack of education.

== Extracurricular resources ==
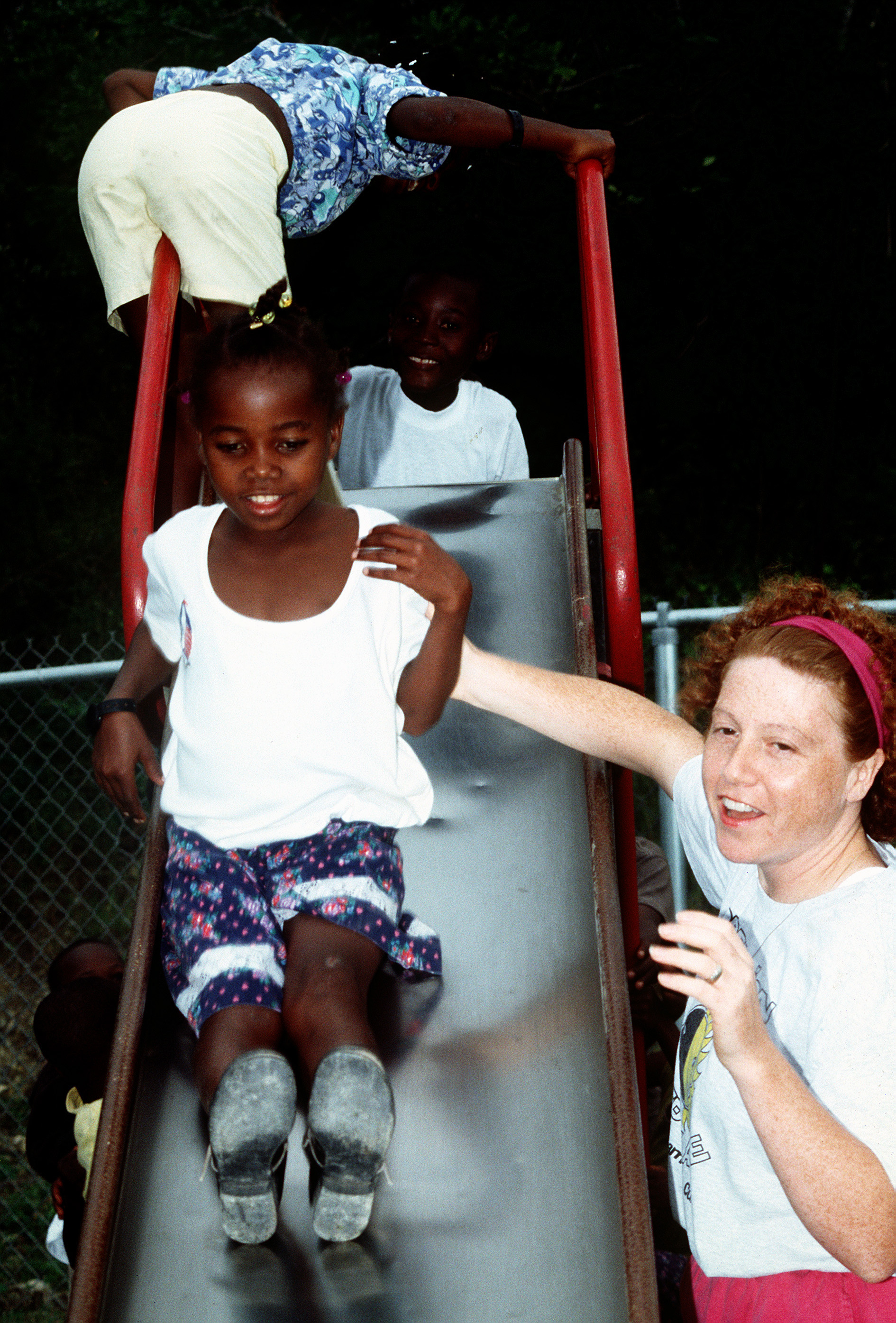
Haitian refugee children playing in the playground after school

An interventional study conducted by Dr. Kendall in California documented that the main resources provided to refugee children and their families fall under these categories: supplementary classroom material, curriculum enrichment resources, videos for the goal or increasing parent and school awareness, informational leaflets and handbooks, as well as ICT based resources. The study also found that extracurricular activities provided by Los Angeles schools enhanced refugee student involvement in school life by reducing isolation. Out of school activities provided by the school included after school study programs that included clubs for homework, revision sessions, exam preparation, and coursework completion. According to the study, the extracurricular language, academic, and social development support provided by the school yielded improvements in the refugee children who attended. The study demonstrated that school staff could also support refugees by raising awareness of refugee culture. For example, some schools in Los Angeles arranged celebrations, assemblies, and cultivated a school environment that actively involved the different cultures, languages and backgrounds of the refugees. The study concluded that the actions of the school had an overall positive effect on the attitudes and empathy of refugee children. Additionally, an anthropological paper found that participation in after school programs lead to increased self concept, high school achievements, educational aspirations and interpersonal competence. As vulnerable populations, marginalized by language, ethnicity, religion and class, refugees can find support in community based organizations as stated by that paper.

According to a study by Dr. Roxas, refugees often do not have access to school programs that can meet their unique academic, developmental, and social needs; thus, their integration into public schools becomes difficult due to language, trauma, and lack of counseling and extra academic services. One extracurricular program that the study detailed involved bringing in local community members to interact with the refugee children for the purpose of exposing them to the real world. According to the study, the program offers a means for refugee children to receive support from community members while also learning about the different types of communities.

A 2008 study by Dr. Kanu describes the school environment as a microsystem important to the acculturation of refugee children. The study states that the inclusivity of schools can be improved by increasing the cultural basis of recreational support, more diverse cafeteria food, and prayer rooms for Muslim students. In addition, teachers are encouraged to undergo training to increase knowledge on refugees and thus adapt their curricula for this group's benefit.

Dr. Pastoor's 2016 research article also detailed the benefits of activities beyond school that may benefit refugee learning and social inclusion. For example, community wide collaboration between the school and surrounding organizations can help refugee students achieve their full potential. Dr. Wellman's and Dr. Bey's research in art education found that visual arts may help refugee students find their own role in and out of school through collaborations between museums, schools, and art exhibitions. Dr. Brunick's paper also found that art served as a valuable extracurricular tool for refugees to reconcile with psychological trauma. According to Dr. O'Shea's 2000 article, inside the school but outside of the curriculum, school based mental health services have been shown to reduce SDQ scores and dramatic positive implications to those exposed to SES and traumatic adversities. The study conducted by Dr. Thomas recommended training for school social workers to help refugee children manage stress and trauma. Dr. Daniel's 2018 article found that refugee children can themselves use translanguaging and social media to themselves complete their school work which teachers and educators can build upon to help teens with this multifaceted work. A 2017 research paper also found that refugee children express their individuality and culture through drawings, think-aloud techniques, and Acculturation, Habits, and Interests Multicultural Scale for Adolescent instrument in order them to cope with their transitions and express their culture.

A research paper focused on policies put in place for refugees in the school system indicated that refugees in Jordan often face institutional discrimination where they do not have the same access to extracurricular activities. According to the paper, funding for refugee education often comes from an emergency fund leading to a lack in long term-planning, which can lead to refugees being educated in separate schools and informal community based schools. Iran has a policy including refugees into their education system allowing refugees to join in the same extracurricular programs. As for extracurricular participation, a 2016 publication noted that refugee children often have similar amounts of participation in most extracurricular school activities; however, they are less likely to participate in after school sports activities, attend day care, and participate in a parent-child conference. A 2011 review noted that schools alone do not provide enough support for refugees and their cultural and linguistic needs. Thus the paper suggests that secondary school programs like the Refugee Action Support (RAS) program can benefit refugee literacy by creating a partnership of schools and non-government organizations.

=== Programs ===
Dr. Georgis's 2014 book offers another example of extracurricular support for refugee children called involved Transition support programs. The study suggests that this program offers classroom support for English Language learners, after school activities involving recreational activities and homework help, as well as parental support that includes English as well as computer classes. In school services include interpretation, translation, personal communication through phone by the school to the homes, cultural mediation and advocacy. The study concluded that cultural brokers who support refugee parents foster a sense of belonging and support for refugee children as well.

A review on the refugee action support program created by a partnership among the Australian Literacy and Numeracy foundation the University of Western Sydney and the NSW department of education and training found that RAS supported the educational goals of the schools in Australia. For example, tutors provided assistance in completing assignments. RAS tutors also allowed for specialized support that teachers often did not have the time to provide.

Another supplemental school program is ACE. A research paper analyzing ACE by Heidi Lynn Biron found that ACE provides support for refugees who struggle with exclusion and school as a result of their English skills and trauma. A 2000 study by Dr. Zhou and Dr. Bankston found that while Vietnamese refugees may do well in school academically, they may have psychological strains that are often overlooked due to their academic performance. The study recommended peer support groups, so the children can share their stress with each other. One 2007 research paper by Dr. Beirens detailed the Children's Fund Service, a program involved in creating social bridges to reduce refugee children social exclusion specifically by giving practical and emotional support.

== Disabilities ==
Children with disabilities frequently suffer physical and sexual abuse, exploitation, and neglect. They are often not only excluded from education, but also not provided the necessary supports for realizing and reaching their full potential.

In refugee camps and temporary shelters, the needs of children with disabilities are often overlooked. In particular, a study surveying Bhutanese refugee camps in Nepal, Burmese refugee camps in Thailand, Somali refugee camps in Yemen, the Dadaab refugee camp for Somali refugees in Kenya, and camps for internally displaced persons in Sudan and Sri Lanka, found that many mainstream services failed to adequately cater to the specific needs of children with disabilities. The study reported that mothers in Nepal and Yemen have been unable to receive formulated food for children with cerebral palsy and cleft palates. The same study also found that, although children with disabilities were attending school in all surveyed countries, and refugee camps in Nepal and Thailand have successful programs that integrate children with disabilities into schools, all other surveyed countries have failed to encourage children with disabilities to attend school. Similarly, Syrian parents consulted during a four-week field assessment conducted in northern and eastern Lebanon in March 2013 reported that, since arriving in Lebanon, their children with disabilities had not been attending school or engaging in other educational activities. In Jordan, too, Syrian refugee children with disabilities identified lack of specialist educational care and physical inaccessibility as the main barriers to their education.

Likewise, limited attention is being given to refugee children with disabilities in the United Kingdom. It was reported in February 2017 that its government has decided to partially suspend the Vulnerable Children's Resettlement Scheme, originally set to resettle 3,000 children with their families from countries in the Middle East and North Africa. As a result of this suspension, no youth with complex needs, including those with disabilities and learning difficulties, would be accepted into the program until further notice.

Countries may often overlook refugee children with disabilities with regards to humanitarian aid, because data on refugee children with disabilities are limited. Roberts and Harris (1990) note that there is insufficient statistical and empirical information on disabled refugees in the United Kingdom. While it was reported in 2013 that 26 percent of all Syrian refugees in Jordan had impaired physical, intellectual, or sensory abilities, such data specifically for children do not exist.

== See also ==
- British Committee for Refugees from Czechoslovakia
- Education for refugees, migrants and internally displaced persons
- Finnish war children
- Mobile learning for refugees
- Refugee women
- Refugee health
- Refugee
- Refugee camp
- Runaway (dependent)
- UNICEF
- UNHCR
- UNRWA
- Third country resettlement
- Asylum in the United States
- International Centre for Missing & Exploited Children
- International Missing Children's Day
