= Refugee women =

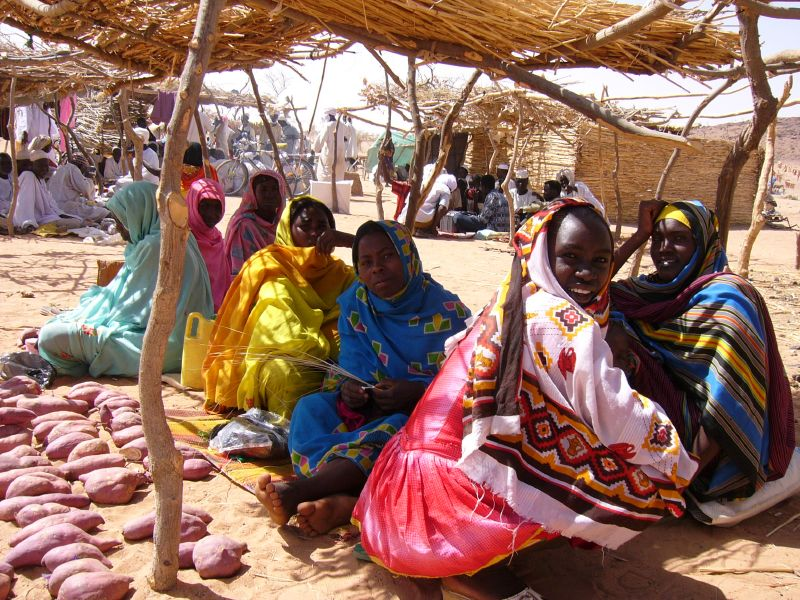
Refugee women in Chad

Refugee women face gender-specific challenges in navigating daily life at every stage of their migration experience. Common challenges for all refugee women, regardless of other demographic data, are access to healthcare and physical abuse and instances of discrimination, sexual violence, and human trafficking are the most common ones. But even if women don't become victims of such actions, they often face abuse and disregard for their specific needs and experiences, which leads to complex consequences including demoralization, stigmatization, and mental and physical health decay. The lack of access to appropriate resources from international humanitarian aid organizations is compounded by the prevailing gender assumptions around the world, though recent shifts in gender mainstreaming are aiming to combat these commonalities.

== Health ==
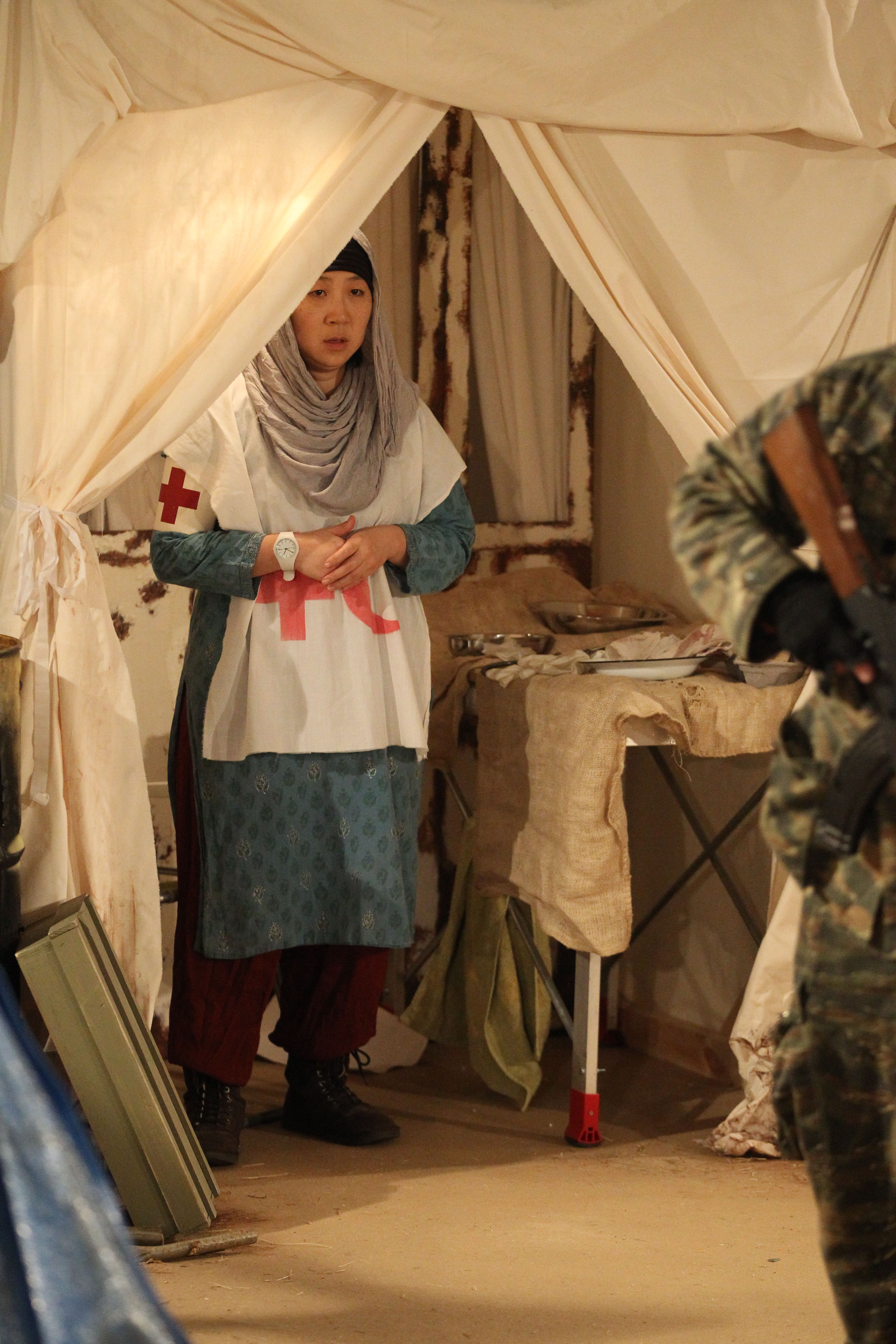
Health clinic inside of a refugee camp

Health issues faced by refugee women range from dehydration and diarrhea, to high fevers and malaria. They also include more broad reaching phenomena, such as gender-based violence and maternal health. The leading causes of death to refugee women include malnutrition, diarrhea, respiratory infections, and reproductive complications. Health concerns of refugee women are influenced by a variety of factors including their physical, mental, and social wellbeing. Health complications and concerns for refugee women are prevalent both during their time as refugees living in transient camps or shelters, as well as once they relocate to countries of asylum or resettlement. External factors contributing to the health concerns of refugee women include culturally-reinforced gender inequality, limited mobility, lack of access to healthcare facilities, high population density within the refugee camps, and low levels of education.

=== Reproductive health ===
International humanitarian aid organizations, such as the United Nations, agree that adequate reproductive care must be "safe, effective...[and] affordable." According to the United Nations, while universal values in human rights support the availability of reproductive health care needs of all women, services that conform to adequate standards while respecting cultural differences are rarely provided to refugee women. Due to the lack of satisfactory reproductive health care in refugee camps, complications related to child delivery and pregnancy was one of the leading cause of both death and illness among refugee women living in transitory camps in 2010.

Refugee women who have left humanitarian aid camps and have moved permanently to countries of asylum and resettlement also face reproductive health challenges. A study published in 2004 by the Journal of Midwifery and Women's Health found that refugee women living in wealthy nations face troubles in accessing appropriate reproductive care due to stereotyping, language barriers, and lack of cultural respect and understanding.

=== Mental health ===
Refugee women often face a host of mental health complications in their home countries, in refugee camps, and in countries of resettlement or asylum. In their native countries, women who have fled as refugees may have been psychosocially or physically abused for a variety of reasons, including genocide; an attempted shaming of a family, community, or culture; or for being seen as " politically dangerous." These forms of abuse often lead to exile or fleeing, and have the propensity to cause distress and detrimental harm to the mental health and wellbeing of refugee women. In refugee camps, the mental health of refugee women is also affected by incidences of discrimination based on gender, sexual and domestic violence, forced labor, and heavy responsibilities. Many refugee women are also found to experience and post-partum depression and severe perinatal depression that can affect their day-to-day life and even their families. In countries of asylum and resettlement, complications with mental health also prevail due to language and cultural barriers, the post traumatic stress of fleeing persecution in their home countries, difficulty seeking mental health treatment, and an increased likelihood of facing abuse as compared to host-country nationals.

In response to fleeing their home countries, refugee and asylum-seeking women develop posttraumatic stress disorder (PTSD). Many researchers subcategorize the construct of trauma as sexual assault, physical abuse, witnessing violence, partner violence, interpersonal trauma, childhood trauma, and complex trauma. Also, research studies define posttraumatic stress disorder (PTSD) as outlined by the American Psychiatric Association. Some symptoms of PTSD include intrusive and recurrent experiences such as nightmares or flashbacks, intense experience of feelings associated with the event, feelings of detachment, avoidance of stimuli associated with the traumatic event, increased arousal, negative alterations in mood, and exaggerated startle response. If symptoms are left untreated, many survivors may experience depression, anxiety, problems with concentration, sleep difficulties, irritable behavior, angry outbursts, and difficulty establishing healthy and meaningful relationships.

Fleeing a home country can cause prolonged psychological distress of marital and family relationships. In some cases, women's investment in family and community life has been detrimentally impacted, leaving them particularly vulnerable to the effects of the trauma because of the impact on women's gender roles in various countries. Women have at tendency to nurture others and maintain relationships. This dynamic ultimately contributes to attachment and attunement towards others. Attachment towards others is one of the social dynamics that is impacted when one experiences PTSD. These effects can be exceptionally detrimental for females who tend to thrive through creating and maintaining connections with others biologically. Unfortunately, refugee and asylum-seeking women face family displacement exacerbating symptoms of PTSD.

Mental health services would benefit refugees, and asylum seekers as PTSD symptoms could worsen if left untreated. A study conducted on refugee and asylum-seeking women examined the effect of a group-based mental health program designed to alleviate posttraumatic stress for Bhutanese refugee women who recently resettled in the United States. Participants were placed into several groups to determine the efficacy of the program. Women were divided into three groups; two groups provided a version of the intervention, and one group served as a control. Results from pre, post, and follow-up assessments show that participants in both intervention groups experienced significantly less anxiety, depression, anxiety, somatization, and PTSD symptoms at posttest. Interestingly, mental health improvement amongst these participants continued at the 3-month follow-up. Contrastingly, control participants who did not receive the same type of treatment showed their mental health symptoms became more severe over time. Importantly, these results suggest that a group-based mental health program designed to address posttraumatic stress can yield positive outcomes on the mental health of recently relocated refugees. Furthermore, these results provide substantial evidence that without intervention, recently relocated refugees could potentially experience declines in mental health over time while resettling in their host country. More research on program efficacy is necessary to provide much-needed support for refugee and asylum-seeking women.

=== Nutrition ===
Malnutrition of refugee women manifests in a variety of ways both in refugee camps and in countries of asylum and resettlement. Issues of food security, economic and political misunderstanding, and discrimination within refugee camps contribute to the poor nutrition and health of many refugee women. In a study of food aid in Rwandan refugee camps, experts found that international aid agencies' lack of consideration and attention to the political, economic, and cultural workings of countries in crises can lead to inadequate and inappropriate food aid, which in turn may result in malnutrition for refugees. Likewise, studies have shown that despite no legal distinction between male and female refugees, international refugee communities and even aid organizations tend to uphold discrimination based on gender. This translates into disproportionate malnutrition for refugee women through lack of priority in food distribution as well as medical attention for nutrition-related issues and lack of reproductive nutritional care.

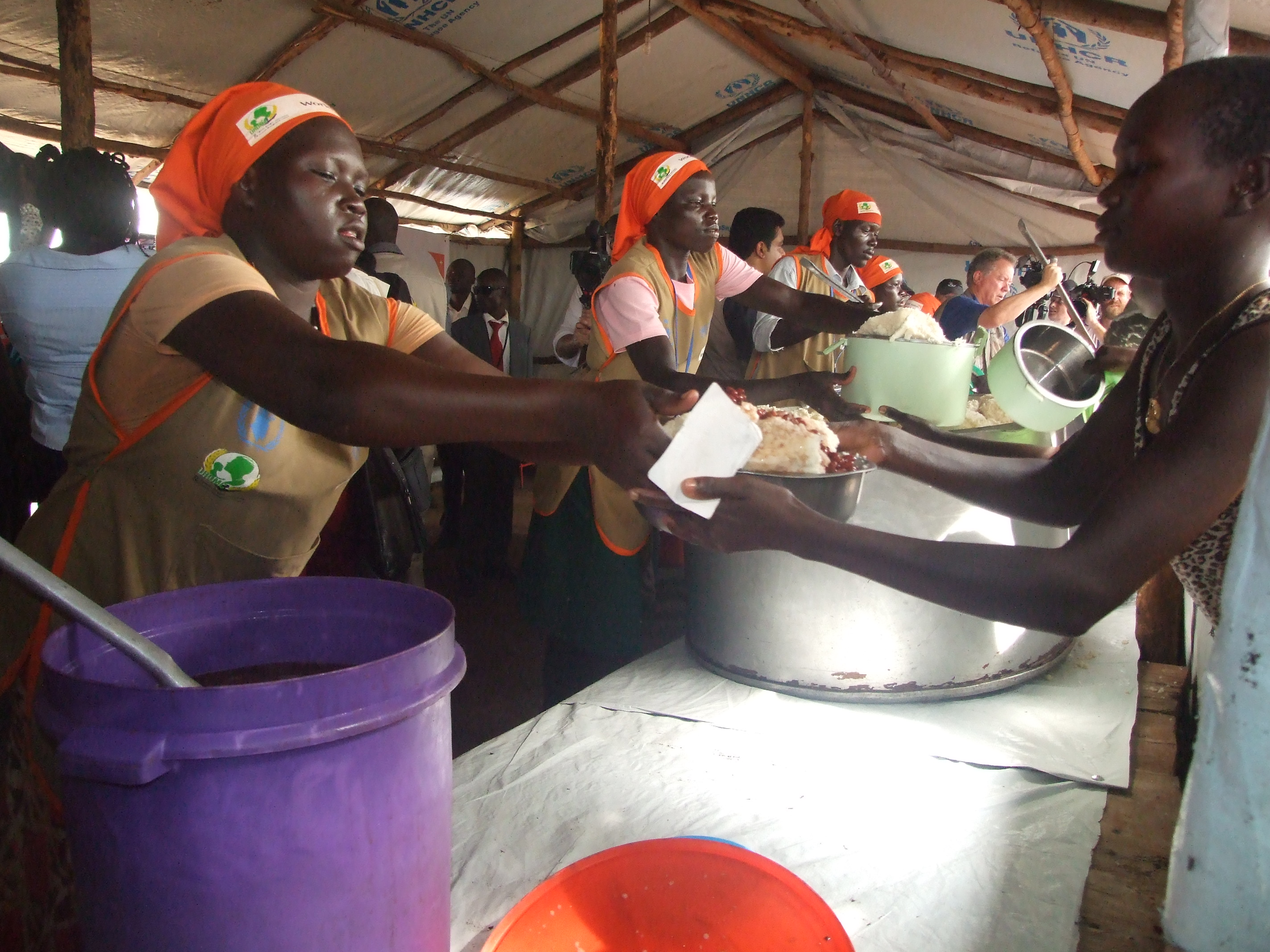
South Sudanese refugees being served food. Many of them complain of hunger due to the food rationing by World Food Program

Issues of malnutrition persist in countries of asylum and resettlement for refugee women though mechanisms of food insecurity and lack of nutritional education. A study on Somali refugee women in 2013 found that rates of meat and egg intake were significantly higher in refugee women than comparable populations of host-country national women, while rates of fruit and vegetable intake were significantly lower. A related study of Cambodian refugee women found that common reasons for poor nutritional intake were living in food insecure, low-income areas, lack of economic means to purchase nutritious food, and lack of education about nutritious eating in their new country of residence.

== Labor ==
Refugee women are often subjected to forced labor in refugee camps through the reinforcement of traditional gender roles and stereotypes. Women in refugee camps are often the primary sources of physical labor for water collection and filtration, as well as small gardening and agricultural tasks and food preparation. Despite their large roles in these areas, women are excluded from leadership on committees and planning parties within refugee camps and are relegated to strictly laborious roles. Meanwhile, male refugees are frequently seen in positions of influence and power within the camp and among international aid agencies.

Refugee women in transitory camps are also frequently subjected to forced labor, encompassing both forced prostitution and forced physical labor. In addition to violating the legal rights of refugees, forced labor experienced by women in refugee camps has been found to be detrimental to their physical, mental, and social well-being. Often, women subjected to these and other forced labors are sought out on the basis of their race and stereotyped low position in society.

== Education ==
In 2020, the enrolment rate of all primary-school-age refugee girls was only 67%, and only 31% for secondary-age girls. Some of the major barriers that girls face in areas like Syria and Lebanon include a high risk of SGBV (sexual and gender-based-violence), financial insecurity, discrimination in curriculum and professional positions, and opportunity costs of avoiding domestic responsibilities. Practical research on girls' and women's education is limited, but there is a lot of literature that identifies why emphasizing education for them is especially important. Investing in education helps with economic and labor force growth, lessens the rate of child marriage and domestic violence, empowers women, and gives them agency.

== Sexual and gender-based violence ==
According to the United Nations, gender based violence in the context of assault against refugee women is "any act of violence that results in...physical, sexual, or mental harm or suffering to women including threats. . . coercion, or arbitrary deprivation of liberty." Assault on refugee women is both sexual and non-sexual, although instances of violence manifest most often in the form of sexual violence for refugee women.

According to a 2000 study, women are particularly vulnerable to rape and other forms of sexual assault in times of war and "disintegration of social structures" for a variety of reasons. These reasons include social unrest, the mingling of diverse cultures and values, prevalent power dynamics, and the vulnerability of women seeking refuge. Ways in which violence and sexual assault manifest themselves against refugee women include forced prostitution or coerced sex by international aid agency workers / volunteers, forced prostitution or coerced sex by fellow members of the refugee camp, forced prostitution or coerced sex by local community members, rape by any of the above demographics, exchange of sex for vital material goods or services, or an attempt to dishonor a woman, her husband, or her father. Sexual violence is considered a taboo subject in many cultures, and therefore gender-based violence often goes unreported as well. Even if women did seek to report violence, often there is nowhere within the refugee camp for them to turn.

Refugee and asylum-seeking women face not only physical violence but also emotional abuse. Emotional abuse is described as any intentional conduct that seriously impairs another person's psychological integrity through coercion or threats. Examples of emotional abuse include isolation from others, confinement, financial control, verbal aggression, dismissiveness, threats, intimidation, control, denying the victim's abuse, and using guilt or shame as a form of control. A study conducted on female trauma survivors focused on mental health amongst asylum seekers found that amongst all types of sexual and gender-based violence (SGBV), 62% of the sample experienced some form of emotional abuse.

Emotional abuse is often overlooked as there are no physical indicators. In a study focused on the association between emotional abuse and awareness, researchers found survivors often develop cognitive strategies to cope with their environments. To add, survivors of emotional abuse may develop denial and dissociation habits to keep distressing thoughts from awareness and ultimately protect themselves. As a result, survivors keep the reality of their situation from consciousness and may not interpret their circumstances as emotional abuse and do not hold the identity of being abused.

Contrastingly, some survivors experience many psychological effects, which further describe the complexities of emotional abuse. The asylum process caused many women to encounter humiliation, confinement, and emotional distress. Consequences of emotional-psychological distress were detected in two-thirds of participants. Respondents described being 'depressed,' 'a psychological wreck,' 'dispirited,' or 'very insecure.' Additionally, survivors became isolative and no longer trusted others. Others dealt with anxiety, shame, guilt, frustration, anger, and hatred. One respondent reported, "Hitting is better than talking. What he said hurt me more than getting slapped. Sometimes being hit is easier to cope with than psychological torture". This sad quote sheds light on how painful the reality is of those who suffer from physical and emotional abuse.

Some risk factors associated with refugees and asylum seekers are identified as behavioral and interpersonal factors. Behavioral risk factors include drug and alcohol use, verbal and non-verbal attitudes, being alone on the streets at night, lack of self-defense skills, and not knowing how to speak the language of the host country. These types of behavioral risk factors caused women to have "no-self confidence," "feeling mentally-ill," and "not having a lot of brains." A quarter of the respondents believed being a woman was also a risk factor, leading them to vulnerable experiences. To add, respondents described intrapersonal risk factors as "having bad examples as friends and parents" and "not having anyone to turn to". Without a doubt, a combination of these risk factors causes many women to feel worthless and hopeless.

Furthermore, outcomes of emotional abuse may affect individuals regarding their social networks and deprive them of opportunities for future personal, social, and economic development. Often, when asylum-seeking and refugee women reach out for help, they risk being separated from their children, being dishonored as a woman, or having dishonor brought to their families. The act of reaching out for help could potentially cause more risk to their livelihood. This dynamic makes it incredibly difficult for survivors of (SGBV) to seek support. More research is needed to address the complexities of help-seeking for refugees and asylum seekers.

An estimate given by the UNCHR regarding the 2015 European refugee 'crisis' stated that approximately twenty-percent of the refugees entering the EU were women. Women made vulnerable due to their refugee status have reported border personnel tasked with overseeing their health and safety as perpetrators of sexual and gender-based violence (SGBV). In response, institutions tasked with addressing SGBV such as the Common European Asylum System (CEAS), have formally integrated gender sensitivity training to meet international and EU standards. These include the 1951 Refugee Convention, Convention on the Elimination of All Discrimination Against Women, and the United Nations Security Council Resolution 1325.

However, research on the issue conducted in 2016 by Jane Freedman amongst key actors such as refugees, Frontex (European Border and Coastguard officials), the UNCHR and human rights organizations have highlighted that the integration of gender specific anti-violence training has yielded poor results. Consequently, refugees entering the EU had voiced concerns of inaccessibility to basic shelter and services in camps with high population densities as a fundamental barrier to ensuring safety from SGBV. Refugee women also face increased exposure to violence on their journeys. This occurs most often at the hands of those facilitating their voyage, which Freedman refers to as 'smugglers'. The legal nature of these incidents of violence renders reporting difficult and inaccessible. Moreover, the frequent changing of asylum routes due to border restrictions in the EU compounds refugee women's exposure to violence by increasing the duration of their route.

== Access to justice ==
It's important to note that rape and sexual offences varies by definition of country; therefore, access to justice may vary. However, many pervasive figures of access to justice persists in:

=== Under-reporting of sexual violence against refugee women ===
Many refugee workers and officials may deny the existence of these issues because they are never reported. Refugee women may then be blamed for the violence against them. Misogyny is a pervasive element to under-reporting due to ostracization of being sexually assaulted both in their own culture and communities, it may be deemed as "shameful" to report. Moreover, there is no language availability in order to report the violence and hinders their ability to voice their experience.

=== State legality problems ===
At times, refugee women do not hold legal documents proving they are legally in a country. Some families of refugee women might have placed the onus on the male "heads of households" holding their legal documents thus making them inaccessible. Without these documents, many refugee women lack access to legal services and resources as legal persons in their landed country. In addition, the legal sources for refugee women in and outside of their designated areas. without other non-governmental organizations, the United Nations' Human Rights Council or other domestic law services available to them are not able to gain access to or seek legal counsel. There is also a lack of trust within their landed country's government, and therefore many refugee women do not feel safe disclosing this issue.

=== UN Conventions ===
The United Nations' Human Rights Declaration and Refugee Women and International Protection No.39 (XXXVI) - 1985 are international legislations that protect refugee women, children and their rights. However, because these laws are internationally legislated they limit the scope of holding perpetrator(s) to account due to the centralized power of domestic justice systems where the ability to access justice and ratify international legislation lies with the state.

== Humanitarian assistance ==
Numerous Nongovernmental organizations (NGOs) and intergovernmental organizations work to advocate on behalf of refugee women and children.

In 1989, the first efforts towards gender specific aid for refugees was published in United Nations High Commission on Refugee manuals. The first initiatives of gender mainstreaming in refugee aid were developed in response to the refugee crises of Guatemala, Bosnia-Herzegovina, and Rwanda. Since that time, the concept of gender mainstreaming has gained traction in a variety of refugee aid initiatives, yet experts believe that there are gaps between the policies they outline and the experience of refugee women.

Studies by Doreen Indra found that while there are many institutions providing humanitarian aid to refugee women, it may not reach its full potential due to a lack of refugee input in the programming and policies meant to provide them assistance. When refugee women are excluded from the development process of humanitarian assistance, it was found that policies are often made rooted in traditional gender assumptions, thereby reinforcing traditional and sometimes harmful gender roles in refugee camps.

A review by Linda Cipriano revealed that another barrier in executing effective aid for refugee women is that women are disproportionately denied status as a refugee, which in turn acts as a barrier to receiving the assistance they need. Since its inception, the universal definition for a refugee as described by the United Nations is a person with a "well-founded fear of persecution due to race, religion, nationality, or political opinion." Under this definition, persecution on the basis of gender and sexual violence are not protected. Many countries abide by this strict language and deny women access to services of declared refugees on these grounds.

The International Rescue Committee serves as an advocate for women to foreign governments to pass laws concerning the health and well-being of refugee women. They also educate men and boys to change the culture of violence towards women.

== See also ==
- Refugee children
