= Kadima House =

Coordinates: 31°46′5.98″N 35°12′33.22″E

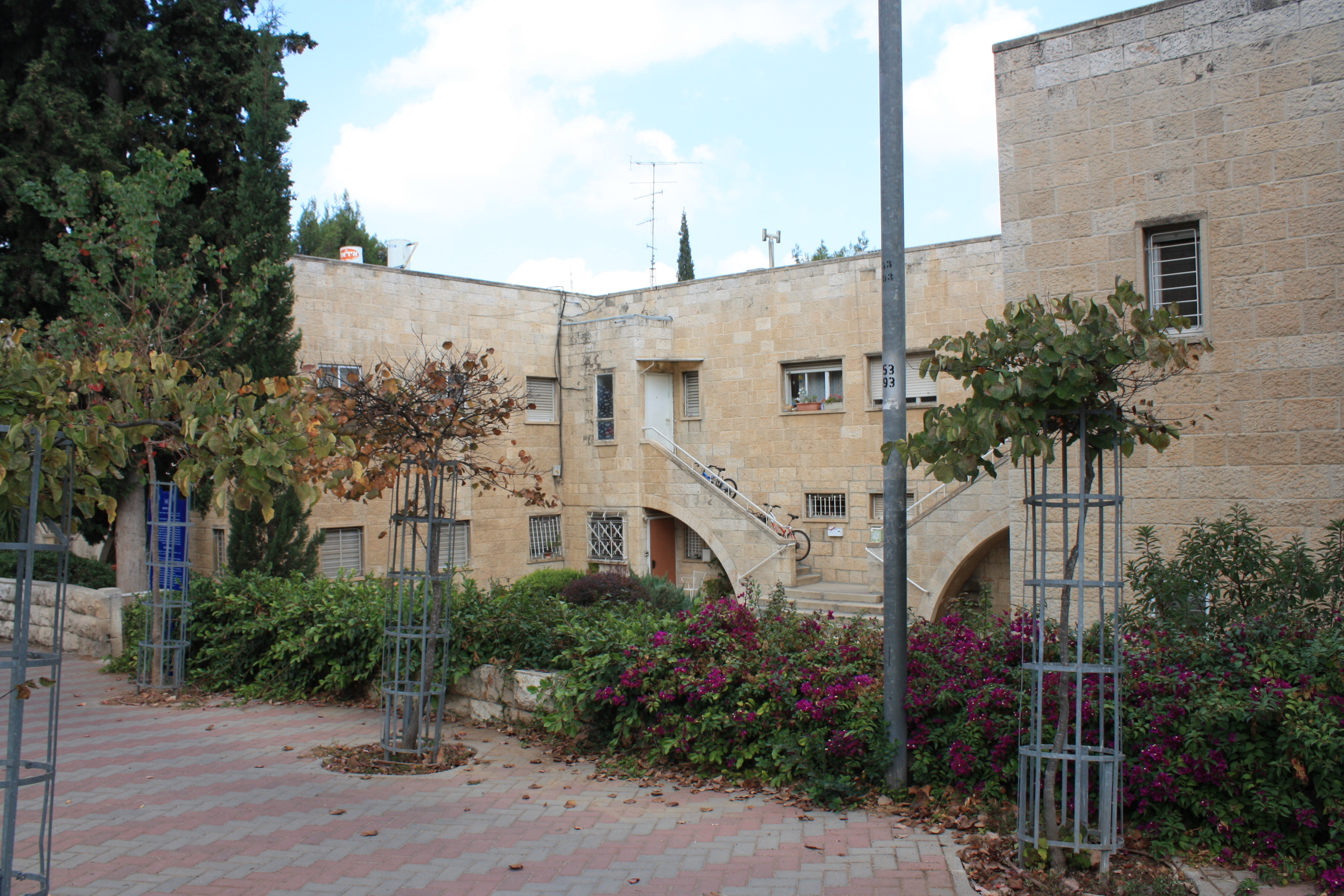
Beit Kadima today

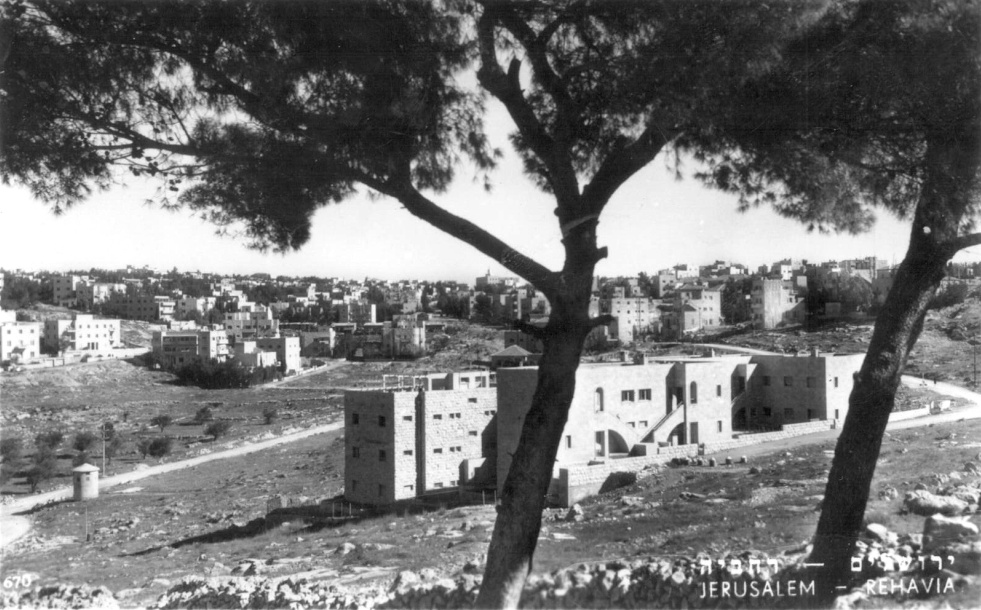
Kadima House, view from Givat Shmuel, c. 1950. In the background is Rehavia. To the left is the "pillbox" at the corner of Gaza and Tchernichovsky.

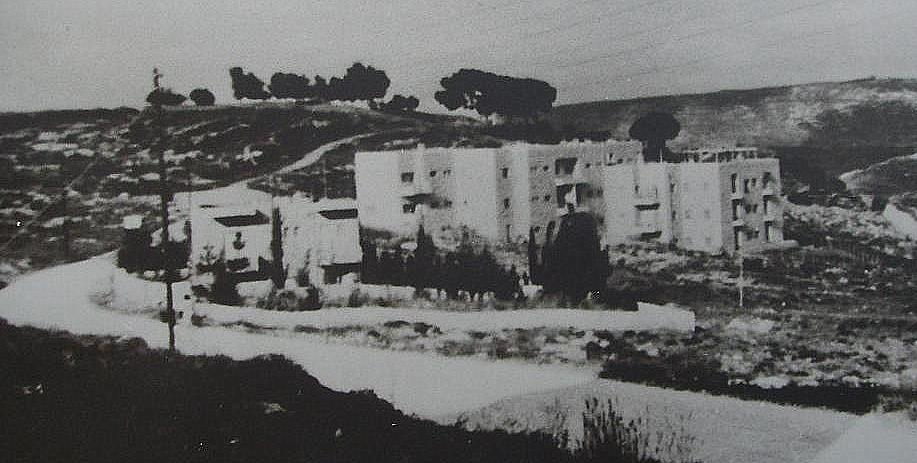
Beit Kadima, 1945

Kadima House, known locally in Hebrew as Beit Kadima, is a residential building complex in Jerusalem, Israel located on the west side of Kiryat Shmuel. The British Mandatory authorities built it in 1945 to house the families of British officers. In the end, it was used by UNSCOP Commission, whose members lived there while drafting the UN Partition Plan prior to the establishment of the state.

The building was designed by German architect Otto Hoffmann during the mid-1940s and constructed by an Egyptian housing company. Hoffmann's plans provided the building with 21 apartments, parking garages and storage rooms. It was built in the International Style along with traditional Jerusalem motifs such as half arcs over the entrances and outside staircases. The building stood empty for several years until the British authorities chose the secluded compound to house the members of the UNSCOP Commission, who were sent by the UN to determine the future status of Palestine/the land of Israel. For several weeks the Commission members lived in Beit Kadima and it can be assumed that it was there where they drafted the recommendation which led to the decision on partition of Palestine and the establishment of two states, a Jewish one (the future State of Israel) and an Arab one. The isolated position of the building at the margin of Rehavia meant that the commission members were easy to protect, but also that they could hardly have any contact with locals during their stay there.

Shortly after the UN decision on November 29, 1947, violence erupted in region and the compound became a refuge for Jewish families living in the predominantly Arab neighborhood of Katamon. The building served as a Haganah military post during the 1948 Arab–Israeli War.

Today some of the original families still live in the compound, which retains its elegant character. In 2007 there was only one lady living there from among those who had moved in during 1947, the other initial tenants having died or moved out in the meantime. Her husband had fought from the house by manning the only available machine gun.

== See also ==
- Architecture in Israel
