= 2004 Jerusalem bus 19 bombing =

2004 terrorist incident in Jerusalem

Jerusalem bus 19 bombing
- Part of the Second Intifada
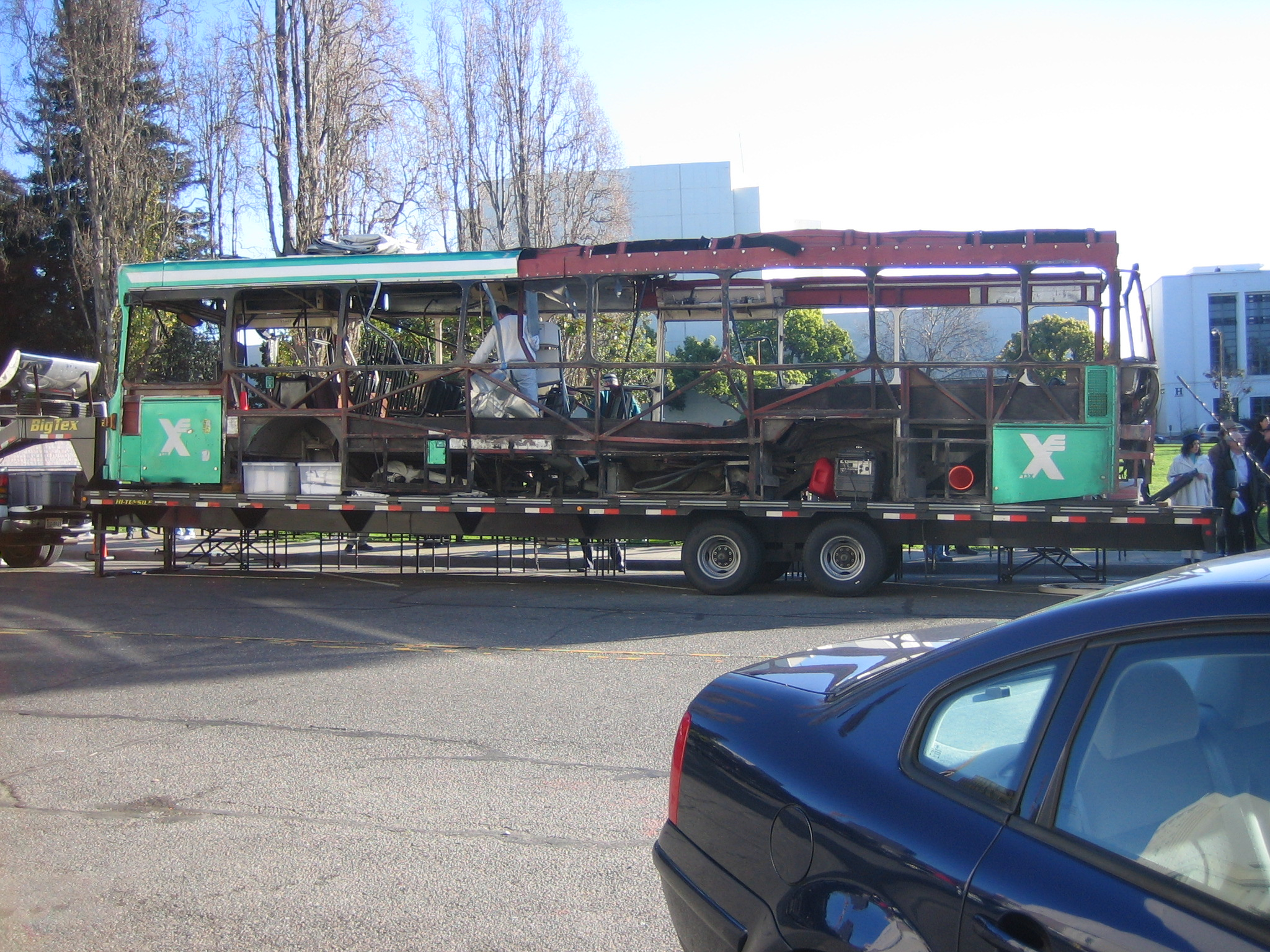
- Remains of the charred bus

- The attack site
- Native name: הפיגוע בקו 19 בירושלים
- Location: 31°46′25″N 35°12′57″E; Jerusalem, Israel
- Date: 29 January 2004; 22 years ago c. 9:00 am (UTC+2)
- Target: Egged bus / Area near Israeli Prime Minister residence
- Attack type: Suicide bombing
- Weapon: 6.8 kilograms (15 lb) Suicide vest
- Deaths: 11 civilians (+1 bomber)
- Injuries: 50+
- Perpetrators: Responsibility claimed by: Hamas; Al-Qassam Brigades; Fatah; Al-Aqsa Martyrs Brigades
- Assailants: Ali Yusuf Jaara, aka Ali Munir Jaara
- No. of participants: 1
- Litigation: Linde v. Arab Bank; Goldberg v. UBS AG; Sokolow v. Palestine Liberation Organization

A Palestinian suicide bombing was carried out in Jerusalem, Israel on Egged bus #19, on 29 January 2004. A Palestinian bomber detonated an explosive belt as the bus was traveling between the two campuses of Hadassah Medical Center, when the bus was at the corner of Arlozorov street and Gaza Street. Eleven passengers were killed and over 50 people were wounded, 13 of them seriously. Both Hamas and Al Aqsa Martyrs' Brigades claimed responsibility. The site was chosen to be near the Israeli Prime Minister's residence. It was the most fatal attack in Israel since the Maxim restaurant suicide bombing, and among the top 20 most deadly attacks of the Second Intifada.

ZAKA, a voluntary post-disaster response team in Israel, alongside a Christian Zionist group called Jerusalem Connection International, brought the bombed out shell of Bus 19 to The Hague in 2004 during a hearing in the International Criminal Court on the West Bank barrier. They wanted to illustrate the human impact of terrorism felt in Israel. Rabbi Avi Weiss attended the display of the bus at The Hague, and said it was an effective emotive piece to connotate the reality of terror. While the bus was displayed at The Hague, Arab leaders including Balad party Arab Knesset member Azmi Bishara, Palestinian Prime Minister Ahmed Qurei, and Palestinian National Initiative director Mustafa Barghouti agreed that the timing of the suicide bombing hurt their people's cause.

After its display at The Hague, the Bus 19 exhibit was seen as successful by Jewish synagogues and university groups in the United States, and ZAKA received requests for it in the U.S. The bus went on a tour in the country, with memorials held at the National Mall near the United States Capitol in Washington, D.C. for the National Day of Prayer in the U.S.; it was subsequently shown at Duke University in Durham, North Carolina, San Francisco and Berkeley, California, and at several other cities. The bus was later transported to Adamstown, Maryland, to be incorporated into a Peace Memorial at Camp Shoresh affiliated with Beth Sholom Congregation. The Bus 19 suicide bombing was featured in an exhibition by Dutch curator Nadette de Visser called Objects in Conflict: Israeli and Palestinian Stories. Her exhibition included a damaged jacket in the attack worn by an injured journalist Erik Schechter from The Jerusalem Post, and was shown in Jerusalem, Tel Aviv, and at the Arti et Amicitiae in Amsterdam, Netherlands. Author Zeruya Shalev based her autobiographical novel Pain on her experiences surviving injuries from the bombing; her book won the 2019 Jan Michalski Prize for literature.

Multiple lawsuits were filed by families of victims of the bombing against financial banking institutions under the U.S. Anti-Terrorism Act of 1992 (ATA), including Linde v. Arab Bank in 2004 and Goldberg v. UBS AG in 2008. The United States House of Representatives discussed the Goldberg impact, in a 2025 amicus curiae brief in the Fuld v. Palestine Liberation Organization case before the Supreme Court of the United States. A separate lawsuit, Sokolow v. Palestine Liberation Organization, triggered the treble damages portion of the Anti-Terrorism Act, and families of Bus 19 casualties and other victims of terror from the Second Intifada period garnered an award judgement of US$655.5 million. The defendants attempted to freeze the payout in a request to the US Supreme Court — this was denied by Supreme Court Justice Sonia Sotomayor, in August 2026.

== Attack ==
Site of bombing in 2023

On 29 January 2004, shortly before 9:00 AM, a Palestinian suicide bomber detonated himself in the back of an Egged bus at the corner of Arlozorov street and Gaza street in Jerusalem. The attack took place near the official residence of then-Prime Minister of Israel, Ariel Sharon. The explosion itself occurred as the bus was approaching Sharon's residence. Sharon was not present in his residence at the time the bomb went off on the bus.

The bus had been crowded and nearly full, due to the attack taking place during local rush hour during residents' commutes. The blast tore the bus apart, blowing the roof into the air and breaking all the windows. Bus 19's former color was originally green; it had become charred by the explosion. One side of the bus had been exploded off and separated from its structure. A sanitation employee who had witnessed the bombing at the site stated he had seen parts of bodies fly into the air and up to dozens of meters away from the scene.

One of the first journalists to arrive on scene prior to the ambulances was Bret Stephens, who was at the time editor-in-chief of The Jerusalem Post. He arrived three minutes after hearing the initial blast from his residence. Stephens recounted seeing "chunks of human flesh" on the ground, a disembodied arm and a leg, and pools of blood. He observed a disembodied torso, three corpses outside of the bus, and three unmoving bodies inside of the bus, in addition to an individual who was rocking with convulsions. He told The Guardian on scene, "There was glass everywhere, human remains everywhere, shoes, feet, pieces of guts. There were pieces of body everywhere."

Paramedic Eli Beer stated the impact zone and disbursement covered a large radius: "There were a lot of heavy injuries, a lot of the people who were injured were in bad condition, a lot of people had missing limbs." Injured patients from the bombing were taken to hospitals in Israel including the Ein Karem and Mount Scopus hospitals within the Hadassah Medical Center, Shaare Zedek Medical Center, and Bikur Cholim Hospital. Body parts were collected from the bomb blast scene and transported to Abu Kabir Forensic Institute in Tel Aviv for forensic identification and criminal investigation analysis. Originally the death count was ten individuals deceased from the bombing shortly after the explosion. After further analysis of the body parts at the Abu Kabir laboratory, law enforcement raised the total to eleven deceased.

== Casualties ==
=== Fatalities ===
Memorial plaque at site of the bombing

The blast killed 11 people and injured more than 50. Thirteen were in serious condition. The Bus 19 bombing was the most fatal terror attack at the time since the Maxim restaurant suicide bombing in 2003. Prior to the explosion, the city of Jerusalem had not been hit with a similar terrorist attack since the 2003 Café Hillel bombing. The Café Moment bombing from March 2002 which also resulted in 11 fatalities, occurred in the same vicinity. The bus 19 bombing was among the top 20 most fatal terror attacks during the Second Intifada.

Terror victims murdered in the bombing included: Eli Zfira, Mehbere Kifile, Dana Itach, Baruch (Roman) Hondiashvili, Yechezkel Isser Goldberg, Natalia Gamril, Viorel Octavian Florescu, Anat Darom, Hava Hannah (Anya) Bonder, Rose Boneh, and Avraham (Albert) Balhasan. Anat Darom was a 23-year-old student who was on the bus on her way to a job interview. Darom was in the midst of her studies in the fields of statistics and sociology. Rose Boneh was thirty-nine and worked in a laboratory alongside her sister. Eli Tzfira worked in janitorial services in education and was on his way to the start of his shift.

Baruch (Roman) Hondiashvili worked in Israel as a prize-winning chef. American actor Jon Voight traveled to Israel and met with children victims of terror including the daughter of Hondiashvili; the actor was moved by the young girl's letter in which she wrote: "Creator of the world, please bring peace to the world." Natalia Gamril emigrated from St. Petersburg, Russia to Israel with her daughter in 1993. Gamril was on her way to her work caring for an elderly woman as the bomb in the bus killed her. She lived together with her daughter Svetlana in the Jerusalem neighborhood of Kiryat HaYovel.

Yechezkel Isser Goldberg, known as "Chezi", was born in Toronto, Canada and immigrated to Israel where he found work in Jerusalem as a counselor to at-risk adolescents and their relatives. Goldberg had himself written journalism two years prior to his death, about the dangers of terrorism in Israel. Writing for Israel National News in 2002, Goldberg commented, "The bomber could very well be someone I have seen in a passing moment. I think we are in this bloody mess because many of the politicos making life-and-death decisions for this country have forgotten that terror is just a five-minute ride from home, anywhere."

=== Injuries ===
ORT Israel computer science instructor, Masha Novikova, sustained heavy injuries in the bombing. She had immigrated from Moscow, Russia, to Israel twenty years previous. After the bombing, her concerns for safety improvements for the people of Jerusalem led her to run for city council in 2008 under the political party of Yisrael Beiteinu. She became leader of the local party of Yisrael Beiteinu in Jerusalem. She served on the city council in 2013.

The Jerusalem Post journalist, Erik Schechter, faced injuries sustained as a passenger on Bus 19. Schechter thought his own leg was mangled at the bombing scene, and that he was going to die, until a policeman on scene pulled someone else's flesh from Schechter's leg. Though initially his injuries were classified as "moderate" — Schechter suffered a shattered kneecap, vascular damage, and wounds from shrapnel. Schechter's recovery from his injuries at the suicide bombing took months. Schechter's colleague, editor-in-chief of The Jerusalem Post Bret Stephens, had arrived minutes after the bombing, and in the chaos failed to spot his fellow journalist at the scene.

Israeli author and literary editor, Zeruya Shalev, was severely injured in the bus bombing. She had just finished bringing her daughter to her kindergarten class. She was on her way back to her residence in the Jerusalem neighborhood of Rehavia and was on the street outside of the bus when the bomb exploded. She was badly hurt, and her wounds required a four month recovery process. She was unable to return to her work as an author, and was immobilized and bedridden during her recovery period. Shalev commented on her recovery process: "I was in bed for half a year—for the first time in my life, I had a lot of time. ... I tried to write, but it was impossible." She recalled that her physical recovery parallelled her ability to return to writing: "I remember so well the day I was able to put my feet on the ground, then how slowly I started to walk again, to sit on a chair, to sit in front of the computer."

== Official reactions ==
=== Israel ===
Prime Minister of Israel Ariel Sharon was stationed at his farm Havat Shikmim in the South of the country when the bomb went off. Raanan Gissin, spokesperson for the Prime Minister's office, emphasized the West Bank barrier would decrease the prevalence of such terrorist attacks going forwards. Prime Minister Sharon representative David Baker referenced the bus bombing in asserting the Palestinian Authority was doing, "absolutely nothing to stop this terror". Jerusalem police chief Mickey Levy lamented the severity of the terrorist attack's impact, "It was a very serious attack on a bus packed with passengers." Shlomo Aharonishki, commander of the national police in Israel, stated to journalists that the bus bombing, "proved once again that there is no change of strategy on the other side. They are still trying to carry out attacks, any way they can. He emphasized similar bombings had been prevented by Israeli security services: "The thin line that divides between today's severe attack and dozens of cases in which attacks were thwarted is (formed by) the security forces, the Israel Defense Forces, the Shabak (security service) and the police."

Prime Minister Sharon met with the Defense Minister of Israel, Shaul Mofaz, in Lod on the day of the bombing to discuss their country's response. During the bombing, Mofaz had been in the midst of a meeting in Tel Aviv, with U.S. diplomats John Wolf and David M. Satterfield on the peace process. After the meeting, Mofaz gathered the heads of the country's defense apparatus to map out their plan. They decided not to close entry and exit from the Palestinian territories in response to the attack.

The day of the bombing, Israel had a previously scheduled prisoner-hostage exchange planned with the Lebanese Shia Islamist paramilitary group Hezbollah. The Israeli government decided to go ahead with the exchange after the bombing, and coordinated the prisoner release four hours after the explosion. They released 400 Palestinian prisoners of Israel into the Gaza Strip and the West Bank. The country also released another 29 individuals primarily from Lebanon, in a deal brought about through participation of diplomats from Germany. Some of the Arab and Lebanese citizens released were taken by airplane from Israel to Germany. Through the same coordinated deal, Hezbollah released Israeli businessman Elhanan Tannenbaum who they had kidnapped, and the bodies of three soldiers of the Israel Defense Forces who had been ambushed by the paramilitary group in 2000. The IDF soldiers: Omar Suad, Adi Avitan, and Benny Avraham, had been used by Hezbollah for external messaging when their bodies were in the group's possession. Avraham had previously participated in a joint communal program with the Jewish community of the Tidewater Region, Virginia. The exchange deal between Israel and Hezbollah had been negotiated over several years prior. As part of the exchange deal, Hezbollah pledged to reveal information about the disappearance of Ron Arad, an Israeli Air Force weapon systems officer missing in action.

Prime Minister Sharon attended the reception of Tannenbaum and the IDF soldiers' remains at Ben Gurion Airport later the same day as the bombing. He made public remarks contrasting the somber nature of the bombing, the reception of the soldiers, and the recovery of the kidnap victim. Sharon stated, "The reality of our lives enforces upon us at times the dreadful mixing of sadness with sadness, of sadness with joy." He explained the Israeli government's decision to continue the prisoner-hostage exchange deal the same day as the bombing, stating the choice was motivated by "Jewish sentiment" and a commitment by the country to "bring the boys home, to the soil of our homeland".

Sharon canceled a planned meeting between Palestinian and Israeli government officials and countries providing funding to both, as a result of the bus bombing. The meeting would have been about improving living conditions for Palestinians. Silvan Shalom, Israeli Foreign Minister, released a joint statement with the Prime Minister explaining their rationale for canceling the meeting: "There is no room for such discussions on this difficult day where innocent civilians were murdered on the streets of the capital of Israel." Shalom requested the Palestinian Authority government carry out their assertions they would work to decrease terrorist acts by Palestinian people, or, "there will not be progress in the peace process".

=== Palestinian Authority ===
Officials representing the Palestinian Authority condemned the Bus 19 bombing. Saeb Erekat, a Palestinian negotiator who served the PA in international relations, stated, "This vicious cycle can only be broken by renewal of a meaningful peace process." He commented without the reengagement of the peace process, the cycle would escalate, saying: "Otherwise, violence will breed violence, bullets will breed bullets." Erekat stated, "We condemn any harm to civilians, Israelis and Palestinians alike." Prime Minister of the Palestinian National Authority Ahmed Qurei offered without any preconditions to reach out and meet with Prime Minister Sharon to discuss the matter. Prime Minister Qurei condemned bus bombing, and "the continued violence against our people".

=== International ===
United States Secretary of State Colin Powell was critical of the taking of innocent lives, and lamented the impact of the terrorist attack on the peace process, commenting: "Once again, terrorists have killed innocent people and at the same time they have struck a blow once more against the aspirations of the Palestinian people to have a homeland of their own. "This kind of action has got to stop."

Secretary-General of the United Nations Kofi Annan exhorted both sides to focus on the Israeli–Palestinian peace process. Annan released a statement from Brussels, Belgium: "Once again I appeal, to Israelis and Palestinians alike, to rise above feelings of anger and vengeance, however natural, and to devote all their energies to negotiating a true and lasting peace in which two peoples will live side by side, each in their own state."

== Perpetrators and investigation ==
=== 2004 law enforcement response ===
==== Intelligence gathering ====
In 2004, the Israeli intelligence community estimated that on any given day, approximately 300 Palestinians were in the act of planning terrorist attacks. The country had faced 139 suicide bombings over a period of 3.5 years. During the Second Intifada period comprising September 2000 through March 2002, Israeli intelligence foiled a total of 31 attempting bombings. This increased from 2002 through 2004, when it successfully stopped 283 additional attempted bombing terror attacks. CNN characterized the bus 19 bombing as an Israeli law enforcement oversight gap, with journalist John Vause reporting: "Bus 19 blown apart in Jerusalem ... Despite an average of 60 terrorist alerts a day, Israel authorities were caught totally off-guard, 11 people dead, 50 wounded. ... Here, when there's an intelligence failure, it can often have deadly consequences."

Both Hamas and the Al Aqsa Martyrs' Brigades claimed responsibility for the attack, which occurred less than 24 hours after eight Palestinians were killed in an Israeli army raid on the outskirts of Gaza. Dore Gold, advisor to Prime Minister Sharon, told CNN the Israeli government uncovered planning regarding the suicide attack that had gone on for weeks prior to the bombing, and that it was not in response to the IDF military raid in the Gaza Strip. Al Aqsa Martyrs' Brigades maintained ties with President of the Palestinian National Authority at the time, Yasser Arafat. The bomber was identified as Ali Yusuf Jaara, a 24-year-old Palestinian policeman from Bethlehem. He was also known as Ali Munir Jaara. He left his will and testament with the Al Aqsa Martyrs' Brigades. The U.S. had previously identified the group on the United States Department of State list of Foreign Terrorist Organizations. Jaara had resided in the Palestinian refugee camp of Dheisheh as well as at Aida Camp. His family expressed surprise at his suicide bombing act. His father his son had been scheduled to be married the week after his death. His father stated, "This does not benefit the Palestinian people. The solution is not such operations but the path of negotiations. I'm sad, I'm angry. I'm against killing innocent people." The bomber's family stated he was proud of his work as a local Palestinian police officer. Jaar's uncle was Jihad Jihara, who had previously been expelled to Europe after the Siege of the Church of the Nativity by the IDF in response to Palestinian militants that had attempted to hide there in 2002.

Hamas military unit the Al-Qassam Brigades released a statement claiming responsibility for the bombing, shortly after one released by Fatah's Al Aqsa Martyrs' Brigades. They said that Jaar was a member of Hamas before his death. Hamas released a photograph and statement after the bombing acknowledging its role and that of the suicide bomber Jaara. The picture showed Jaara holding an automatic rifle, standing beside a belt of explosives, and wearing a bandana associated with Hamas. In the picture, Jaara's bandana stated in Arabic, "the Al-Qassam Brigades" — the Hamas military wing. Hamas criticized Fatah's Al-Aqsa Martyrs Brigades for its "hasty claim" that Jaara had carried out the bombing on their behalf instead of Hamas. Both Hamas' Al-Qassam Brigades and Fatah's Al-Aqsa Martyrs Brigades had previously worked together to carry out a joint attack in collaboration with the 2004 Erez Crossing bombing. Jaara carried a bag onto the bus that contained metal shrapnel pieces in a bag along with 15 pounds of explosive materials. He was given the bomb by Al Aqsa Martyrs' Brigades and they drove him to the bus. Prior to the bombing, he was known in his local community to be a member of the Palestine Liberation Organization political group Fatah. Hamas published a statement explaining their location choice near the official residence of Prime Minister of Israel Ariel Sharon. Hamas stated explained the suicide bombing, "sent a clear message to the Zionist war criminal Sharon: that he is not far from the hands of our fighters.".

==== Military operations ====
The day after the attack, Israel Defense Forces entered Bethlehem to conduct operations. IDF troops went into Aida Camp, where they demolished the residence of the suicide bomber and also made five arrests in the area. Operations by the IDF in response to the attack continued for a second day, where the soldiers arrested three suspects and searched the area door-to-door in their investigation. Forces used in the operation included army tanks, armored troop transports, jeeps, and approximately 20 other IDF military vehicles. On 2 February 2004, the Shin Bet acted in conjunction with the Israel Defense Forces in a counterterrorist operation in Aida Camp. During the operation the Israeli forces killed Muhammad Abu Ouda, leader of the Bethlehem district chapter of Izadin al-Kassam. Abu Ouda was a member of Hamas and involved in leadership of the bus bombing plot. He reported to Hamas member, Ali Alaan. Abu Ouda had been educated under Ali Alaan in bomb building and deployment. He rose to become the top bombing consultant of Hamas in the Bethlehem region. He was involved in gathering additional terrorists and motivating them to carry out suicide bombings. Prior to the Bus 19 bombing, in mid-2003, Israel had given the name of Abu Ouda to security officials within the Palestinian Authority, but they did not action on the intelligence.

Israeli officials told The New York Times in February 2004 that Al Aqsa terrorist cells behind suicide bombings including Bus 19, particularly those out of the Bethlehem area, were being financed and organized by Iran, through its proxy Hezbollah in Lebanon. Further investigation into the bombing identified other Hamas terrorist cell members, including Muhammad Kayed Khalil al-Nashash and Nufal Jihad Nufal Adawin. Adawin was indicted by a military court in Israel for his role in the attack. The indictment stated Adawin acted in coordination with another member of Hamas and was helped by the terrorist organization called Tanzim-Fatah. Both Adawin and al-Nahash were convicted for their crimes and membership in terrorist groups.

=== 2025 prisoner-hostage exchange ===
Criminal mastermind behind the planning and orchestration of the attacks, Hilmi Abdul Karim Muhammad Hammash, was arrested and convicted for his leadership role in the Bus 19 bombing. Hammash received a total of 12 life sentences for his role in orchestrating the Bus 19 bombing. In 2013, the Palestinian National Authority official daily newspaper Al-Hayat al-Jadida reported that Palestinian Minister for Prisoner Affairs named Issa Karake spent the Ramadan period visiting the family of Hammash. While their relatives are jailed in prisons in Israel, their families garner a monthly allowance of funds from the Palestinian Authority. Upon release from prison, the prisoner additionally receives a stipend higher than the usual salary given to workers residing in the Palestinian territories. During the same period of Ramadan in 2013, the terrorism orchestrators were praised on Palestinian television and Fatah social media pages including Facebook. Leadership representative from Fatah, Tayseer al-Bardini, was shown in media releases characterizing the terrorists as "heroes" in praise extolling their actions.

In 2025, while in the midst of serving his life imprisonment sentences, Hammash was selected for release as part of a prisoner-exchange by Israel for hostages taken by Hamas during the Gaza war hostage crisis. His release was chosen during the slated round for 13 October 2025, included in a total of 250 prisoners with life sentences for release by Israel as the first phase of implementation of the 2025 Gaza peace plan. Upon Hammash's slated release, The Daily Telegraph characterized him among the more noteworthy of the 250 individuals discharged from prison in the Hamas-Israel exchange. Writing for The Spectator, Middle East human rights campaigner Tom Gross was critical of Hammash's planned release by Israel, cautioning about worries of recidivism.

== Aftermath ==
=== Bus display ===
==== The Hague, Netherlands ====
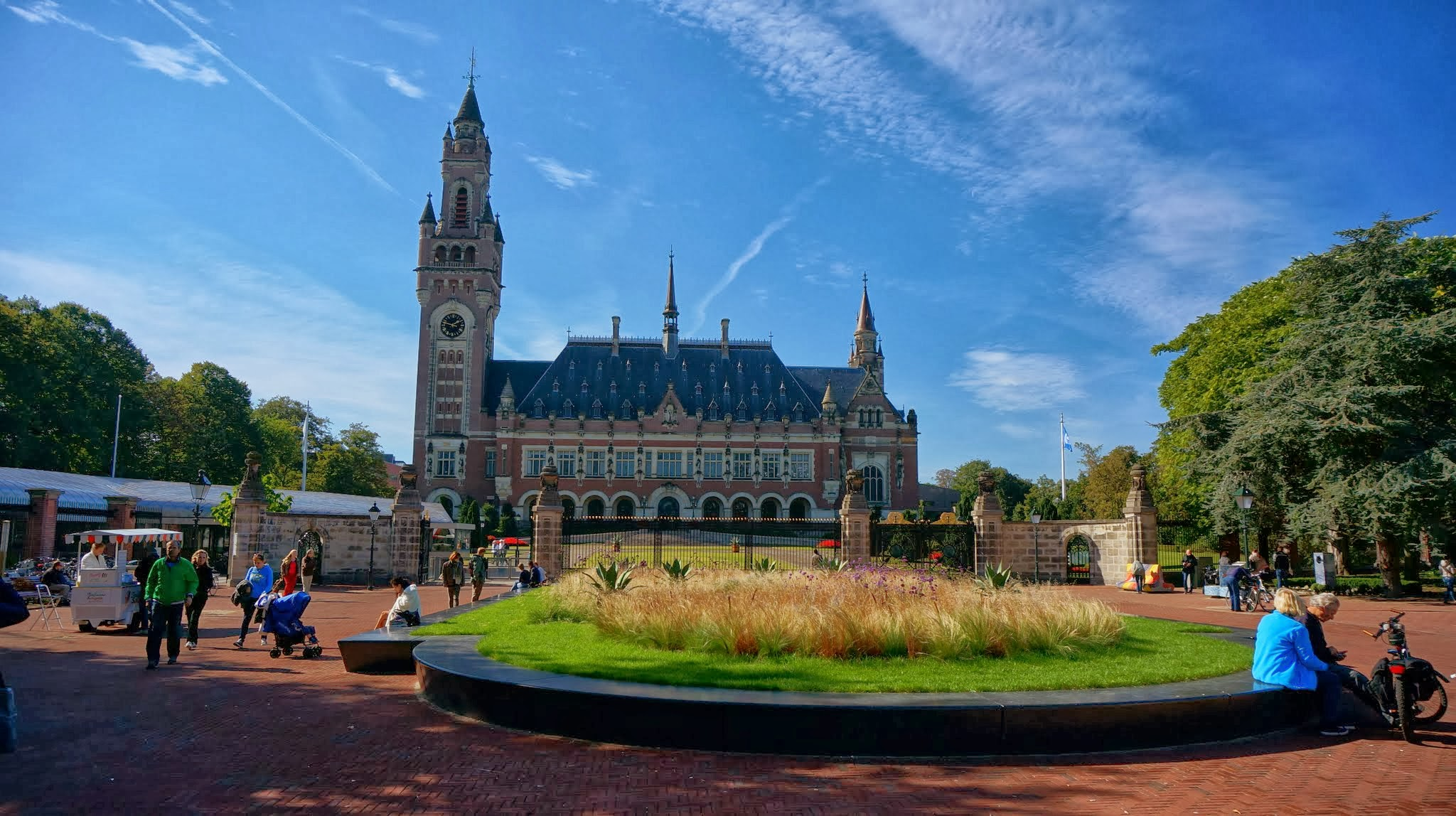
The Peace Palace in The Hague, Netherlands, seat of the International Court of Justice

Originally the wreck of Bus 19 was maintained and stored by the Israeli voluntary post-disaster response organization ZAKA in Jerusalem. ZAKA is responsible for the collection of body parts in Israel after terrorist attacks occur. The Jerusalem Connection International, a Christian Zionist organization also known as Christians for Israel, assisted ZAKA to bring the bus to be displayed at The Hague in the Netherlands. The wreck of the bus was on display first at the Hague for the International Court of Justice hearing about the Israeli West Bank barrier. The bus arrived at The Hague just prior to the 23 February 2004 hearing on the West Bank barrier Israel was building at the time. Display of the bombed out bus in The Hague had to first get confirmation from Dutch government authorities, and they approved its display during the ongoing debates over the West Bank barrier in Israel. In addition to the bus itself, the display showed posters with photographs of the eleven people murdered in the bombing. Ten members of the ZAKA organization stood around the shell of the bus wearing yellow uniforms.

Israelis hoped that by bringing the bus to The Hague, they could show the West Bank barrier was utilized to prevent terror attacks such as the one that killed the passengers on Bus 19. Haim Fuchsman, a representative of the ZAKA organization who came with the bus during its tenure in the Netherlands, gave his impression of the impact of the bus display at The Hague: "People from all over the world had come to the Hague. The atmostphere was almost holy, as if the world had been silent, but now they were seeing how the Israelis had been suffering." Fuchsman noted he had observed the emotive nature on the bus 19 display at the Hague on attendees: "Many people saw the bus and shed tears. I felt that I was a representative there for everyone who had been killed." ZAKA director in Europe, Iris Boker, noted the emotive power of the husk of the bus, and observed while at The Hague her organization had already fielded requests from multiple organizations in the United States to display the wreckage.

Rabbi Avi Weiss attended the display of the destroyed bus at The Hague, alongside 700 pro-Israel demonstrators and 1,200 Christians holding signs of Israeli terror victims. Weiss saw the bus being moved into the area during their protest against terrorism, observing, "While we were gathering to make our protest, the remains of Bus No. 19, a bombed-out Israeli bus from a recent terrorist attack in Jerusalem, was slowly towed into the area where we stood." Weiss commented that the display of the bus was an effective addition to the protest against terror: "The sight of the charred and mangled remains of the bus injected a powerful sense of reality into the scene."

While the remnants of the bombed out vehicle were on display at The Hague, Balad party Arab Knesset member Azmi Bishara commented that the suicide bombing act on the bus did not further his group's political cause, and hurt their message at the International Court of Justice. Bishara stated, "It is the worst thing that could have happened in terms of the battle for public opinion. But these attacks, which are so hurtful to innocent people, have nothing to do with the Palestinian argument against the wall. Actions against civilians only help the Israelis to make life more severe for Palestinians."

Prime Minister of the Palestinian National Authority Ahmed Qurei was not supportive of the bombing campaign. He observed that events such as these suicide bombings decreased empathy around the world for Palestinians at the international level. He went on to assert the bombing was actually carried out intentionally to weaken the case of his fellow Palestinian leadership during their argumentation at The Hague.

Palestinian National Initiative director Mustafa Barghouti agreed that the timing of the suicide bombing hurt his people's cause in their argumentation at The Hague. He commented, "I feel angry because the bombing was wrong. It was not necessary. The whole world was respecting our self-restraint after what Israeli did in Gaza. We declared that we wanted a ceasefire and that Israel was the party which violated it all the time." Barghouti went on to emphasize the bombing illustrated the need for unity when attempting to express their political message, saying, "What happened has proved again, if the launch of the Geneva Accord did not settle the issue last time, that we need unified leadership and strategy. We cannot have three different lines at the same time."

==== United States tour ====
Bus frame on display at University of California, Berkeley (16 January 2005)

The bus was on display at The Hague for three days during the hearings on the West Bank barrier, and it was subsequently returned back to Israel. Christians for Israel and ZAKA were both motivated by the response they received from peoples' reactions to the bus display at The Hague in the Netherlands. This impact motivated the two groups to bring the bus to the United States in May 2004. U.S. Brigadier General James M. Hutchens served as president of the Jerusalem Connection organization, and was involved with bringing Bus 19 to the U.S. Hutchens explained his motivation to display the bus in the United States: "There is a global threat that we are facing today. We want to come together and say this is unacceptable." The original intended stops included Manhattan, New York, Chicago, Illinois, Denver, Colorado, Indianapolis, Indiana, and the District of Columbia.

Bus 19 first came to be displayed in the U.S. in Washington, D.C. While in Washington, D.C., the remnants of the bus was displayed on the National Mall near the United States Capitol. The event was held in conjunction with the National Day of Prayer in the U.S. The sister of one of the victims attended the Washington, D.C. event on 6 May 2004. Yechezkel Goldberg was one of the eleven individuals murdered in the bombing, and his sister Carrie Devorah was at the event. Her brother was the first Canadian to die in a suicide bombing attack in Israel. Zelig Feiner attended the event as a spokesperson for the ZAKA organization. Feiner commented to the Associated Press, "Here in Washington, which is the centre of the Western world, we feel this is the right place to bring over the message that terror will not be tolerated." Feiner emphasized that his organization ZAKA volunteered to assist at similar terror events around the world: "Especially as volunteers who have attended to terrorist attacks, not only in Israel, but all over the world, if its a 9/11, if its in Turkey, if its Mombassa, we feel that we have not only the right, but the duty to bring out the strongest message against terrorism, and terrorism of any kind because terror is terror. There's no such thing as good terror or bad terror. Terror is evil and we have to do all that we can to condemn terrorism."

After its exhibition in the District of Columbia, the bus was displayed in Baltimore, Maryland in July 2004. It was shown in Baltimore at the Yeshivat Rambam Maimonides Academy. While not on memorial display, the bus was stored near Washington, D.C., in Ashburn, Virginia. Under the co-sponsorship of many Jewish and Christian organizations, churches, and synagogues, it was put on display in several cities and at various US universities. At stops along its tour, the bus was held out as a focal point for rallies against terrorism. Palestinian and Muslim organizations in the U.S. protested against the display of the bombed out bus, stating its husk of its original chassis represented one piece of an ongoing political dispute over time.

The Jewish campus organization Chabad brought the shell of the bus to Duke University in Durham, North Carolina, in October 2004. The exhibit was titled, "Bus 19 Memorial Exhibit" and it was located in front of the Duke Chapel in the Main Quad of the campus. Executive Director of Chabad at Duke University Rabbi Zalman Bluming explained the purpose of the memorial: "Its display at Duke reflects students' pride and solidarity with the people of Israel and the sorrow for the victims and their families." Rabbi Bluming went on, "It also conveys students’ condemnation of the ruthless tactics that have been used by Israel’s neighbors in this conflict to derail the possibility of peace." Duke University graduate student Jonas Rosenblum led a silent candle-light memorial vigil in front of the shell of the bus.

Bus 19's wreckage came to San Francisco, California, and the University of California, Berkeley in Berkeley, California, in January 2005. It was called the "Rally Against Global Terrorism". The event was criticized by Pro-Palestinian groups. Program director of the San Francisco chapter of the American Arab Anti-Discrimination Committee, Rayan Elamine, stated, "We think they are playing into people’s fears and not their hopes for a better future." Israel Action Committee of the East Bay sponsored the display at Berkeley. The group's representative Susanne "Sanne" DeWitt organized the event. DeWitt explained her intentions for the event to the East Bay Times, "The message I want to get out is terrorism can come to any ordinary person going to work, school or shopping. Ordinary citizens going about their daily lives. It's shocking ... one second they were going to their destinations, and the next second they were literally blown to pieces." The 16 January 2005 memorial services event incorporating the bus was located at the Martin Luther King Jr. Park in the Berkeley Historic Civic Center District. Approximately 700 people attended the event. The bus exhibit in Berkeley briefly became violent with an altercation between protesters of opposing sides, until they were successfully separated by riot police. The violence was started when aggressive counter-demonstrators holding Palestine flags attempted to enter into the Israel supportive side of the previously separated groups. Counter-demonstration officials had previously asked their own attendees not to interfere with the anti-terror rally itself. Master of ceremonies David Meir-Levi commented of the violent counter-protestors, "They attempted to disrupt the rally through the same kinds of intimidation and indiscriminate violence that are the hallmarks of our 21st century scourge, global terrorism."

After its display at Berkeley, a similar event with Bus 19 was held the following day at Civic Center Plaza in San Francisco. The bus was displayed in front of San Francisco City Hall. The bus was featured in a display outside of the Museum of Tolerance in Los Angeles, California, on 30 January 2005. The memorial event at the Museum of Tolerance was supported by StandWithUs, the Israeli Consulate General, and the Simon Wiesenthal Center. A memorial event with Bus 19 was held in Hampton Roads, Virginia in April 2005. In addition to the District of Columbia, North Carolina, and California, Bus 19 was displayed in Florida and Texas to illustrate the reality of the impacts from terrorism.

==== Peace Memorial at Camp Shoresh ====
The shell of the bus made its way to a metal scrapyard in Frederick County, Maryland, called Reliable Junk. Scrapyard president, Brian Sclar, was a member of Beth Sholom Congregation of Frederick, Maryland. Sclar heard the story of the bus bombing and the history of the bus and reached out to his local synagogue Rabbi Morris Kosman, who contacted Rabbi David Finkelstein. Finkelstein was the camp director for Jewish summer camp facility in Adamstown, Maryland, called Camp Shoresh. Bus 19 was moved to become located as a Peace Memorial, at Camp Shoresh. It arrived at the camp in Frederick County, Maryland, in March 2006. Finkelstein commented, "We're not bringing this here as a confrontational thing, but as a peaceful memorial for all sides."

=== Cultural impact ===
==== Objects in Conflict exhibition ====
The Bus 19 suicide bombing was featured in an exhibition by Dutch curator Nadette de Visser in a 2006 presentation in the Knight's Palace in the Old City of Jerusalem's Christian Quarter. Titled, Objects in Conflict: Israeli and Palestinian Stories, her exhibition was displayed in Jerusalem in June 2006 and in Tel Aviv in November 2006. The exhibit featured 16 items that by themselves seemed ordinary in nature but together were representative of trauma from both Palestinians and Israelis from the ongoing conflict in the region. de Visser decided to include the mangled remnants of a jacket from The Jerusalem Post journalist Erik Schechter, who had been injured on the bus. She wanted to emphasize, "to get away from that stereotypical enemy image and realize that in the end, we're all dealing with human beings here, and that notion is getting lost more and more on both sides." The exhibition curator explained her thought process behind the pieces she chose for the exhibit: "The selection is based on the idea that you want people to understand each other better and to renew a small base of empathy for each other's story and each other's experience." After its exhibition in Jerusalem, de Visser took the piece be shown in Amsterdam at the Arti et Amicitiae — followed by a display at the Masa Aher-Geo Photo College in Tel Aviv. The curator later developed her piece into a book of the same name. The book featured photographs of the objects including Schechter's jacket damaged by the bus bombing, from Israeli Associated Press photographer Oded Balilty.

==== Pain: A Novel ====
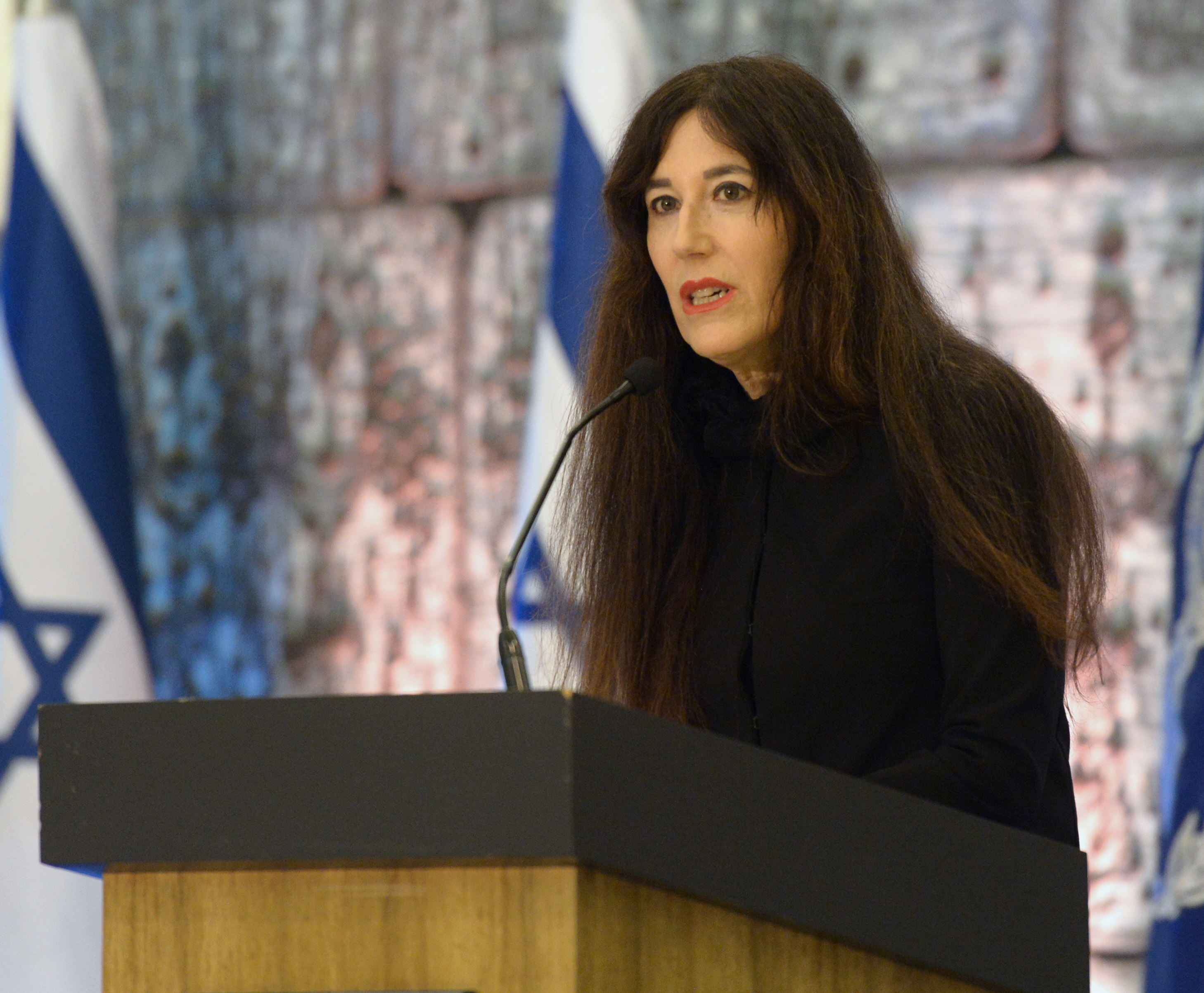
Pain by Zeruya Shalev, inspired by her experiences as a survivor of the Bus 19 bombing, won the Jan Michalski Prize for literature in 2019.

Author and literary editor Zeruya Shalev based her fifth novel on her experiences as a survivor of the Bus 19 bombing. It took the form of an autobiographical novel. The 2019 book, titled: Pain: A Novel, featured the protagonist heroine named Iris who had survived an act of terrorism. The book was the first time Shalev felt she was readily able to write about her own experiences surviving the bombing. The work begins with her character visiting a pain clinic on the tenth memorial of the original terror attack that had left her severely wounded. The character was recovering from multiple fractured bones, burns, and many surgeries over a period of months to fix a fractured pelvis. In an analysis of the book in the academic journal Prace Filogiczne, Elvira Grozinger wrote: "Her description of the terror attack is striking and penetrating".

Shalev wrote of "the intensity of the detonation, this almost volcano-like eruption of the explosive, not the nails, the screws, bolts, and nuts mixed with rat poison in order to cause heavier bleedings, which deafened her ears". The book followed the character's ten-year-period of emotionally coping with the fallout of physical and psychological recovery from the bombing. Jewish Book Council noted, "the specter of tragedy in Israel is presented as a simple fact of life — just as Iris’s pain is for her."

For her work on the book, Fathom Journal called the author, "Israel's Literary Therapist". Shalev's book won the Jan Michalski Prize for literature. The Jan Michalski Foundation jury in awarding Shalev the prize called her book, "a dizzying novel in which the author explores the physiological and emotional territories of suffering". The jury characterized the work as reflecting the psychological trauma of terrorism: "Shalev’s book also represents the novel as the scar tissue of a country."

=== Anti-Terrorism Act lawsuits ===
==== Linde v. Arab Bank ====
Bus 19 bombing victims and their families filed multiple lawsuits against banks and financial institutions to recover money for supporting terrorism. These lawsuits were possible through a provision of the United States Congress federal law, United States Anti-Terrorism Act of 1992 (ATA). The ATA provides for individuals negatively impacted by US-identified foreign terrorist groups to request money for difficulties due to terrorism incidents.

The Bus 19 bombing was included in a lawsuit by U.S. victims of terror in a case against the Arab Bank. The victims were represented by the law firm Osen LLC, which filed the lawsuit Linde v. Arab Bank in July 2004 in the United States District Court for the Eastern District of New York. The terror victims represented in the case attempted to hold the Arab Bank responsible for injuries and fatalities suffered from Palestinian terrorist groups during the Second Intifada of 2000-2004. Litigation procedures and appeals proceeded for ten years. A jury trial was presented in Brooklyn, New York in 2014. The trial focused on terrorist incidents the victims stated were carried out by Hamas. A jury of eleven people was unanimous in their 22 September 2014 decision, in finding the Arab Bank responsible for deliberately giving financial assistance to Hamas. The jury's unanimous decision was the first and only instance where a financial organization was found liable at civil trial for abetting terrorist activities.

==== Goldberg v. UBS AG ====
Goldberg v. UBS AG discussed by United States House of Representatives, in Supreme Court of the United States case Fuld v. Palestine Liberation Organization in 2025.

The family of Bus 19 terror fatality Yechezkel Isser Goldberg (Stuart Scott Goldberg) filed a lawsuit against UBS bank under provisions of the ATA in 2008. The case, Goldberg v. UBS AG was also filed in the United States District Court for the Eastern District of New York. Plaintiffs included Goldberg's wife, Karen Goldberg, and their seven children. The plaintiffs in the federal lawsuit sought to see UBS bank responsible for giving financial assistance to the terrorist group Hamas.

Goldberg described a network of charities under an umbrella called the "Union for Good", founded in 2000 to provide support for Hamas. One of those organizations within the Union for Good was the Association de Secours Palestinien (ASP) located in Basel, Switzerland. The United States Department of the Treasury characterized ASP as the main source of financing for Hamas in Switzerland. President of the United States George W. Bush formally categorized ASP as a Hamas fundraising entity on 22 October 2003 and put ASP on the Office of Foreign Assets Control (OFAC) list and designated it as a Specially Designated Global Terrorist (SDGT).

Plaintiffs asserted that in spite of the United States federal government formally identifying ASP as a global terrorist group, UBS kept on providing it with financial services. Goldberg wrote that UBS transferred money from ASP to a local organization controlled by Hamas in the West Bank called Tulkarem Zakat. It found the last of three payments to the local organization of Hamas in the West Bank was made a few weeks prior to the Bus 19 bombing. The lawsuit survived a motion to dismiss in a ruling by the judge in 2009. Judge Charles Proctor Sifton issued a ruling finding that on the majority of counts in the Goldberg complaint, the plaintiff's wife and children adequately argued that UBS bank willfully ignored due notice that it was abetting terrorism through its financing of Hamas organizations.

A 2019 analysis of the lawsuit's significance in the Florida State University Law Review noted, "The significance of this case rests in the lack of compliance by financial institutions and their collaboration with designated terrorist groups despite being fully aware of the repercussions." According to the U.S. Treasury Department, UBS settled with the U.S. federal government related to the bank's financing of terrorist organizations, for about US$1.7 million. In a 2025 amicus curiae brief filed by the United States House of Representatives before the Supreme Court of the United States in a separate case, Fuld v. Palestine Liberation Organization, the U.S. House cited the Goldberg v. UBS case in emphasizing the importance of the Anti-Terrorism Act. In their Supreme Court brief, the U.S. House drew upon the federal court ruling in Goldberg v. UBS case which emphasized, "[t]here can be no dispute that combating international terrorism is a paramount interest of the United States".

==== Sokolow v. PLO ====
In a separate lawsuit, Sokolow v. Palestine Liberation Organization, against the Palestine Liberation Organization and Palestinian Authority, the Goldberg family was combined with multiple other victims of terrorism during the Second Intifada period. Sokolow v. PLO was initially filed in 2004, in the United States District Court for the Southern District of New York. Lead plaintiffs in the lawsuit were Mark and Rena Sokolow and their children Jamie and Lauren, who had been injured in a separate bombing in Jerusalem during the Second Intifada in 2002. During the September 11 attacks, Mark Sokolow had survived after being in the South Tower when it was struck by United Airlines Flight 175. His family changed a planned vacation to Florida to instead visit his daughter in Israel, and were subsequently impacted by terrorism the following year in Jerusalem, in the Jaffa Street bombing. The case focused on the Palestinian Authority Martyrs Fund, whereby the PA made payments to terrorists and their families after inflicting harm on individuals including U.S. citizens. This link helped tie the case to legal jurisdiction within the U.S.

During the trial, Karen Goldberg and her children testified on behalf of her deceased husband. She stated her seven children ranged in age from eldest 16 to youngest one year old at the time of the Bus 19 suicide bombing. Goldberg explained to the jury that her children faced serious psychological trauma due to the death of her husband. She said her one year old child had delayed speaking until the age of three, whereupon his first utterance was, "Did someone kill my father?" Symptoms suffered by Goldberg's children were recounted by his wife as including anger management, family disruption, depression in childhood and adolescence, and difficulties with education. Goldberg testified to the mental state of her son, "He wanted to know, 'Where is the bad man?'"

In 2015, the lawsuit was initially successful, and the families of the terror victims were awarded a judgement of US$218.5 million. The Palestinian Liberation Organization and Palestinian Authority were both found liable for the terror attacks during the Second Intifada in the Jerusalem area from the years 2001 through 2004. According to the Anti-Terrorism Act, the damages were able to be tripled in size. The 2025 ruling for the plaintiffs by the Supreme Court of the United States in the Fuld v. Palestine Liberation Organization decision, strengthened the legal standing of the parties in the Sokolow case as well.

In April 2026, after a period of protracted litigation, legislation, and appeals, the United States Court of Appeals for the Second Circuit reinstated the initial judgement value, plus treble damages — in the total amount of US$655.5 million. The PLO and PA then made an emergency request to the US Supreme Court in July 2026 in an attempt to freeze the judgement and avoid the payout of the US$655.5 million, and argued the United States Court of Appeals for the Second Circuit did not have the authority to enforce the ruling plus treble damages. In August 2026, Associate Justice of the Supreme Court of the United States Sonia Sotomayor denied an emergency motion before the US Supreme Court from the defendants, in their unsuccessful attempt to freeze the payment to the plaintiffs in the Sokolow case.

== Analysis ==
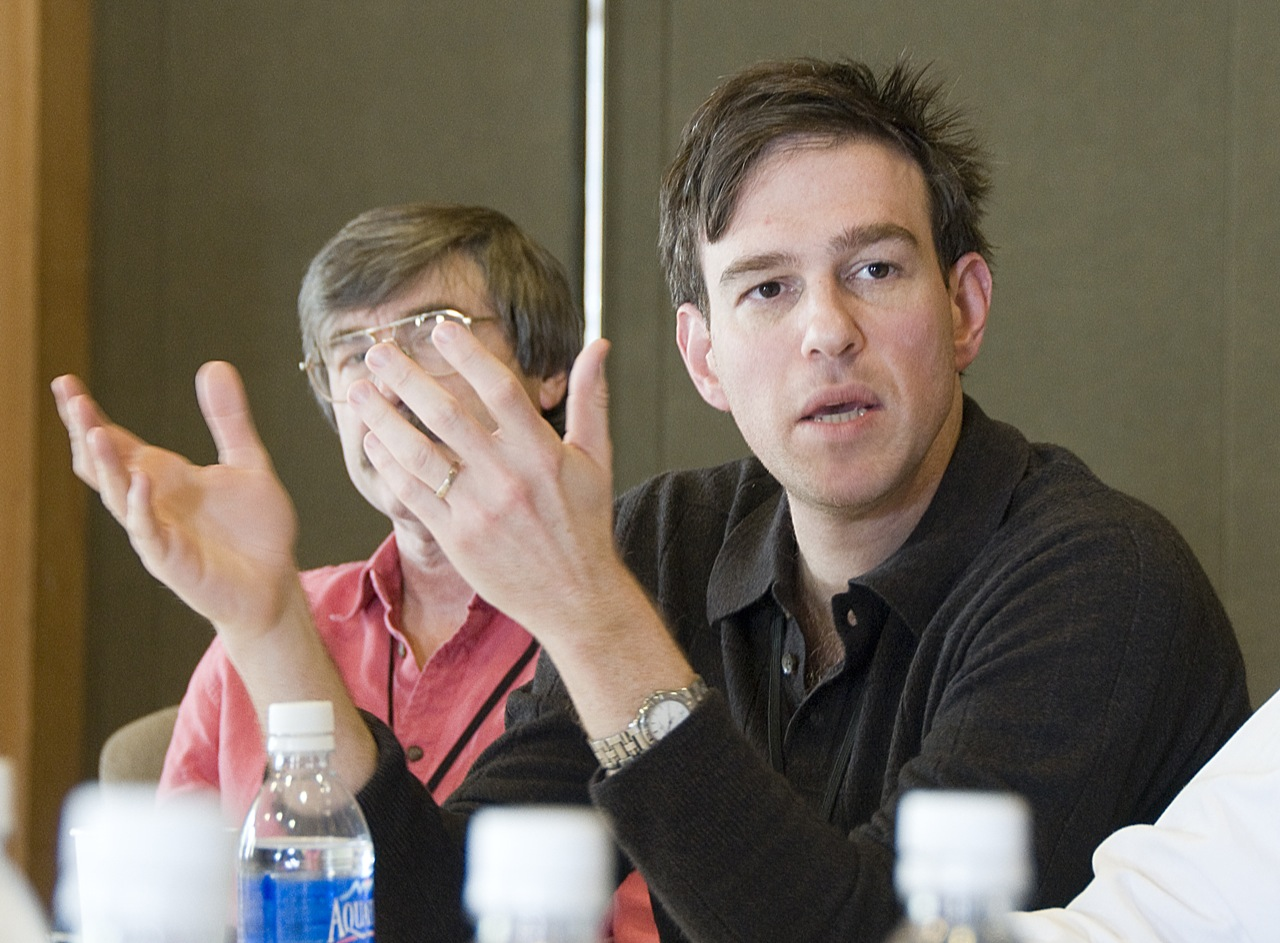
The Jerusalem Post editor-in-chief Bret Stephens reflected on his experiences responding to the Bus 19 bombing minutes after the explosion.

The Guardian journalist Ian Black reported on the display of the bus from The Hague in 2004, "outside the neo-gothic building, the fury of the Middle East raged unabated. Evidence of the conflict's human cost was everywhere." When the charred remnants of the bus was displayed near the United States Capitol on the National Mall in 2004, the Associated Press called it, "A stark symbol of terrorism". The news agency went on to note the bus came to represent Israel's actions protesting its criticism of the West Bank Barrier while at The Hague, and more broadly of the impacts of terror: "The hulk of the bus has become a symbol of Israel's defiance of the World Court in the Hague as well as a potent symbol of the remains of a terrorist attack." After successfully bringing the shell of the bus to be displayed as a memorial exhibit at Duke University in 2004, the Chabad organization noted, "Bus 19 has become a global symbol for the dread of life under terror, both in Israel and throughout the world."

A Theory of International Terrorism: Understanding Islamic Militancy (2006) by author L. Ali Khan examined the bus usage after the bombing by ZAKA and Jerusalem International in what he referred to as a form of propaganda. He acknowledged the gruesome nature of the bombing itself, while simultaneously lamenting usage of the shell of the charred bus on the global stage. Khan wrote, "The journey of Bus No. 19 is a remarkable story of real suffering and its dramatization for discrediting the Palestinian liberation movement in occupied territories. He was critical of display of the bus at The Hague to "dramatize the horrors of terrorism". After leaving The Hague and traveling on exhibits around the U.S., Khan characterized the bus display usage as gaining in fame, writing, "Thereafter, Bus No. 19's wrecked remains acquired a celebrity status. ... — to furnish visual effects of terrorism."

In his 2007 book, Terror: How Israel Has Coped and What America Can Learn, political scientist and expert on bioterrorism and terror medicine author Leonard A. Cole interviewed The Jerusalem Post journalist Erik Schechter about his own experiences dealing with his injuries as a passenger from Bus 19. Cole asked the journalist if his impressions of the Israeli–Palestinian conflict or politics more broadly had shifted, as a result of directly himself being a victim of a Palestinian suicide bombing. Reflecting back, Schechter observed his own views had principally remained the same, "I'm still a secular classical liberal — sort of capitalist, separation of church and state, that sort of thing." Schechter commented generally about the Palestinian use of suicide bombers in an attempt to affect political change: "The only thing I feel, really, is pity for a society that makes heroes of people like suicide bombers. What are they going to say in their history books? That when they get to this period in their history their most popular people, their heroes, were mass murderers?" In a 2008 article on the lawsuit of the victim's family in Goldberg v. UBS AG, The Canadian Jewish News noted the path of Bus 19 from The Hague at the International Court of Justice, to display at cities and universities in the U.S. organized by ZAKA and Christians for Israel, and finally its movement to Camp Shoresh in Adamstown, Maryland. The paper pointed out that, after the bombing, "The wrecked bus, meanwhile, has had something of a second life."

The case was analyzed in a 2011 issue of the academic journal, Land Forces Academy Review, in a behavioral analysis piece examining the psyche of the terrorist, their personality, and their degree of introspection and self-control of their impulses. Writing in 2015 for The New York Times, author Matthew Levitt cited the attack in commentary saying the Palestinian Authority "was tied to terrorist activities through lower level officials", noting the suicide bomber was a P.A. police officer. In a 2016 piece for The Wall Street Journal, reporter Bret Stephens reflected back on the impact of witnessing the scene on the ground of the bus bombing, prior to the arrival of any ambulances. As then-editor-in-chief of The Jerusalem Post, he had been one of the first reporters on the scene of the bombing. Stephens observed, "Living in those circumstances had a strange dichotomous quality. Things were absolutely fine until they absolutely weren’t." He commented on the emotional aftereffects of witnessing a suicide bombing, "The sense of normality was achieved through an effort of will and a touch of fatalism. Past a certain point, fearing for your own safety becomes exhausting. You give it up." In 2025, Stephens again reflected back on witnessing the aftermath of the bombing on scene. He noted he had been directly on the scene and in the chaos failed to spot his fellow journalist, Erik Schechter. Stephens cited being a direct witness to the suicide bombing, in his piece critiquing use of the phrase, "Globalize the intifada".

== See also ==
- Café Moment bombing
- 2004 in Israel
- 2004 in Palestine
- Fuld v. Palestine Liberation Organization
- List of terrorist incidents in 2004
- List of Palestinian suicide attacks
- Palestinian political violence
- Sokolow v. Palestine Liberation Organization
- Timeline of the Israeli–Palestinian conflict
- Timeline of the Israeli–Palestinian conflict in 2004
- Zeruya Shalev
