= Yisroel Yaakov Lichtenstein =

English rabbi

Yisroel Yaakov Lichtenstein (born March 1954) is the former Av Beit Din of Federation of Synagogues in London, having given notice mid-2019 that after 30 years at that post he'd being moving to Israel.

Yisroel Yaakov Lichtenstein, who is also referred to as Yaakov Lichtenstein and Yisroel Lichtenstein continued to serve as the official rabbi of a small congregation until making Aliya. Among the issues that called for him to interact with UK government was gender separation of religious schools.

== Overview ==
His challenges were not limited to dealing with religious freedom regarding gender separation in Jewish schools. In 2009, in response to "questions from various quarters," Lichtenstein authored a "to explain what is meant by" article regarding the idea of supervising more than one standard for kosher meat, justifying higher level(s) based in part on "since 1905, the London Board for Shechita always provided for two levels of Kashrut."

At the time he left London, his co-dayanim were Moshe Elzas, Yehonoson Hool, and Yehoshua Posen Both he and his successor are American born.

== Early life ==
Lichtenstein grew up in Boston. Beginning age 20 he lived and studied in Israel for 14 years. He moved to London in 1988.

== Shailatext project ==
Lichtenstein, having spoken out in 2018 about the need for kosher use of technology, lead preparations for what the Federation of Synagogues called their Shailatext project, a people-powered technology based process for answering Halachic questions, especially for "those who have not yet found a rabbi." His successor, Shraga Feivel Zimmerman, noted in a mid-2019 interview that "Zimmerman estimates that he has answered 200,000 sh’eilos [questions] from all over the United Kingdom while in Gateshead — in person, over the phone, and by email and text." By the time Lichtenstein retired, the service was described as achieving "response within four hours."

== Personal ==
His father, Kalman Lichtenstein, was a rabbi in Massachusetts; his mother's name was Golda.

Preceded by	ABD Federation of Synagogues; 1989-2019	Succeeded by Rabbi Shraga Feivel Zimmerman
