= Zeruya Shalev =

Israeli author

- צרויה שלו
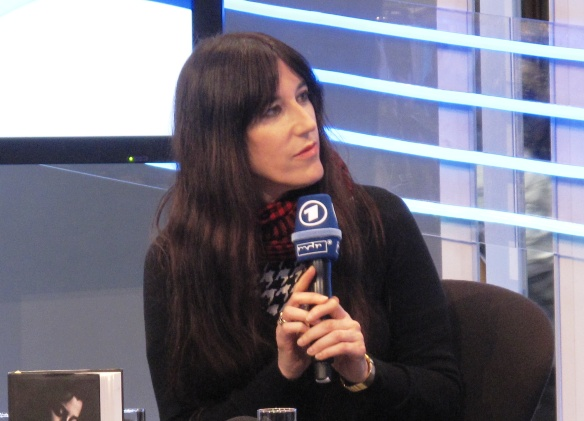
- Zeruya Shalev during Leipzig Book Fair 2012
- Born: 13 May 1959 (age 67); Kvutzat Kinneret, Israel
- Occupation: Novelist
- Writing career
- Language: Hebrew

Zeruya Shalev (Hebrew: צרויה שלו; born 13 May 1959) is an Israeli author.

== Biography ==
Zeruya Shalev was born on Kibbutz Kinneret. She has an MA in Bible studies and works as a literary editor at Keshet Publishing House. On 29 January 2004, when she was returning to her home in Rehavia, Jerusalem, after taking her child to kindergarten, a Palestinian suicide bomber blew up a city bus as she was passing by. It took her four months to recover from her injuries. Shalev is married to Ayal Megged, son of Aharon Megged. Her cousin was the author Meir Shalev. Her brother is the mathematician Aner Shalev.

== Literary career ==
Shalev has published six novels, a book of poetry and two children's books. Her novels Love Life, Husband and Wife, Thera, The Remains of Love, and Pain have received critical acclaim both in Israel and abroad. They have been translated into 27 languages and were bestsellers in several countries. Shalev has been awarded the Book Publishers' Association's Gold and Platinum Prizes, the German Corine Literature Prize (2001), the French Amphi Award, and the ACUM prize three times (1997, 2003, 2005). In 2012, Shalev was awarded the Welt Literaturpreis by the German newspaper Die Welt for her body of work, acclaiming her great magical language.

Husband and Wife was nominated for the French Femina prize (2002), and is included in the French Fnac list of the 200 Best Books of the Decade.

The novel Love Life was ranked by the German newspaper Der Spiegel among the twenty best novels of the last forty years, alongside works of Saul Bellow and Philip Roth. It has been adapted for the screen as Love Life (German title Liebesleben), a joint 2007 German/Israeli film directed by Maria Schrader.

In 2001, she received the Corine Literature Prize for Mann und Frau. In 2014, her novel The Remains of Love won the Prix Femina étranger. In 2019, she won the Jan Michalski Prize for her novel Pain.
