= Yisroel Mantel =

21st-century American Orthodox rabbi

Rabbi Yisroel Mantel
- ישראל נתן הלוי מנטל

Senior rabbi of Khal Adath Jeshurun
- In office April 19, 2018 – June 15, 2026

Associate rabbi of Khal Adath Jeshurun
- In office September 17, 2006 – April 19, 2018

Rabbi of Jüdische Gemeinde Luzern
- In office 1994 – September 17, 2006

Personal life
- Born: Antwerp, Belgium
- Education: Yeshivas Beer Yaakov; Mir Yeshiva

Religious life
- Religion: Judaism
- Denomination: Orthodox

Yisroel Mantel (Hebrew: ישראל נתן הלוי מנטל) is an American Orthodox rabbi who has served as the senior rabbi of Khal Adath Jeshurun in Manhattan, New York since 2018, and previously as its associate rabbi from 2006. He was elected as the rabbi of the Jewish community in Gateshead, England in 2025 and was inaugurated as its Rabbi on June 25, 2026. In May 2026, Rav Liron Rogovsky was elected to serve as the next rabbi of Khal Adath Jeshurun.

== Life and career ==
Mantel was born and raised in Antwerp, Belgium. He studied at Yeshivas Beer Yaakov in Be'er Ya'akov, Israel, and later at the Mir yeshiva in Jerusalem. He reportedly studied mathematics at a university in Zurich, Switzerland. He has a daughter who lives in Edgware, England.

In 1994, he was appointed as the rabbi of the Jüdische Gemeinde Luzerne in Lucerne, Switzerland, where he led the Jewish community until September 2006.

On September 17, 2006, Mantel was appointed as the associate rabbi of Khal Adath Jeshurun in Manhattan, New York, under its senior rabbi Zachariah Gelley. His inauguration was attended by leading rabbis including Dovid Feinstein and Reuven Feinstein. He started leading the community when Gelley became ill, and succeeded him as rabbi following Gelley's death in September 2018. In 2026, Rav Liron Rogovsky was elected to as the next Rav of Khal Adas Yeshurun He became recognized as one of the most senior pulpit rabbis in the United States.

During an event in June 2008, Rabbi Mantel asserted that the philosophy of Torah im Derech Eretz was no longer viable in the era. This philosophy, founded by Samson Raphael Hirsch, calls for engagement between Jewish religious law and culture and society. Mantel argued that its implementation was only possible during Hirsch's lifetime. His statement angered members of the community and led to the resignation of its president, Eric Erlbach.

The Jewish community of Gateshead, England is an ultraconservative Haredi community of 4,000 members. In January 2020, following the departure of Shraga Feivel Zimmerman to lead Kehillas Federation in London, Mantel was initially offered the position of rabbi for the Gateshead community but declined, citing his commitment to his community. In October 2025, he accepted the role, explaining that he wished to move closer to his children and grandchildren. The president of the Gateshead community, Meir Bodner, praised the selection in a letter to the community, describing Mantel as "respected, renowned both as a talmid chochom of stature and with decades of experience in rabbonus (rabbinic service) and communal leadership."

Mantel visited Gateshead during November 2025 to deliver sermons and shiurim and meet with community members. He was elected in a vote held after his visit, receiving 97% of the support.
