= Eliezer Igra =

Interim president of the Council of the Chief Rabbinate

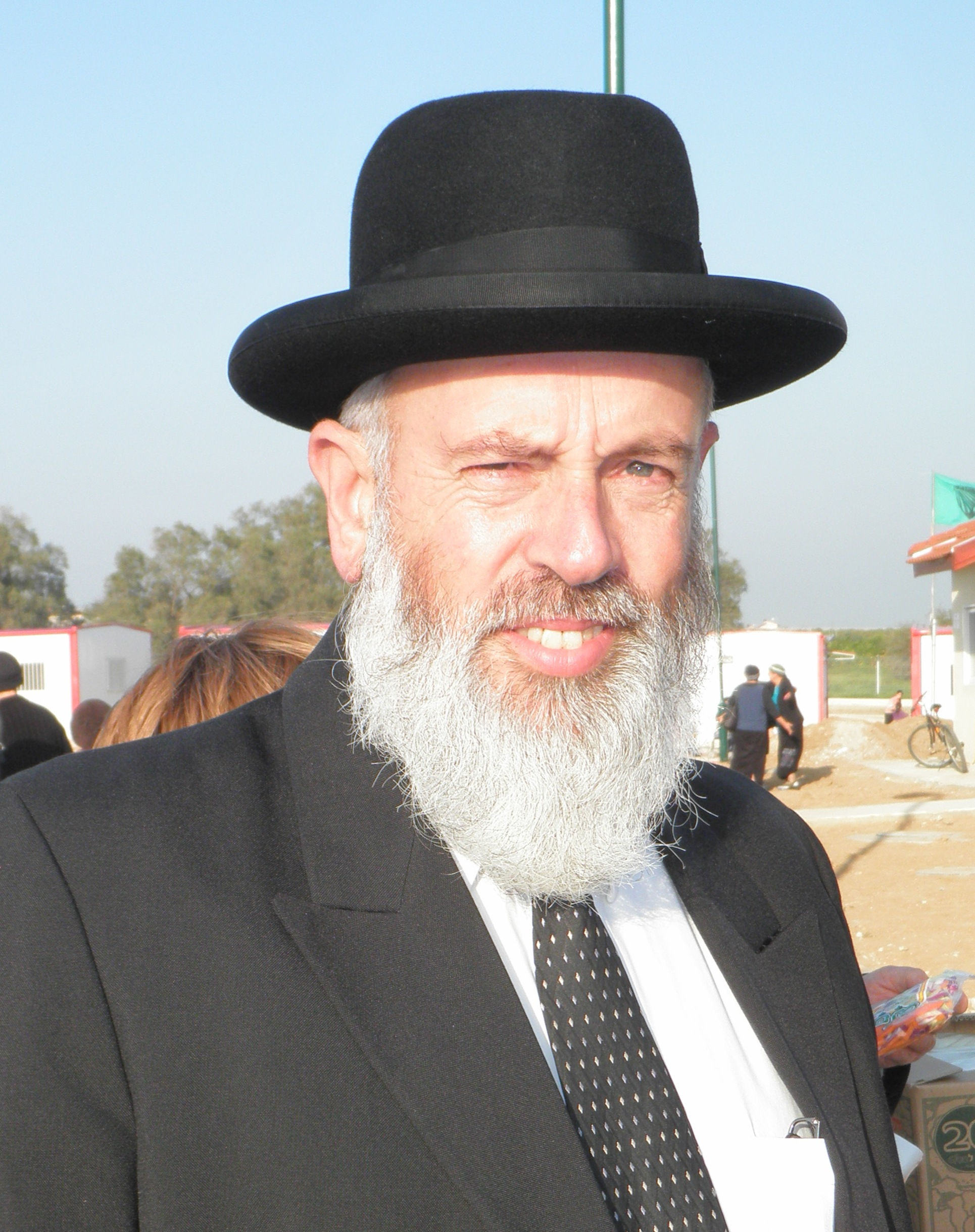

Eliezer Igra (Hebrew: אליעזר איגרא; born 1954/5714) is a rabbi, dayan of the Upper Beit Din of Israel, the Av Beit Din of the Beersheba Beit Din, and the Moshav Rabbi of Kfar Maimon. Igra was a Religious Zionist candidate for Chief Rabbi of Israel in the 2013 nominations for that position. On 21 February 2013, at a convention of leading Religious Zionist rabbis, Igra was voted the leading candidate in a secret ballot, though this vote is not binding and merely a popular declaration of support. Shortly before the actual elections took place, Igra withdrew from the race.

On 30 June 2024, Igra was appointed interim president of the rabbinical court, replacing former Chief Rabbi David Lau alongside Rabbi Yaakov Roja, who is filling the role of former Chief Rabbi Yitzchak Yosef as president of the Council of the Chief Rabbinate.

Eliezer Igra began learning at Yeshivat Kerem B'Yavneh during which time the Yom Kippur War and he took part in the fighting. After the war, Igra was placed in the battalion commanded by Yonatan Netanyahu with whom he studied Torah. In 1989, at the young age of 33, he was nominated by the Chief Rabbis Mordechai Eliyahu and Avraham Shapira to be a dayan at the Beersheba Beit Din.

Igra is married to Ruhama (wedded by Rabbi Isser Yehuda Unterman) and has nine children.
