= Bezalel Rakow =

British rabbi (1927–2003)

Rabbi Bezalel Rakow
- Title: Gateshead Rov

Personal life
- Born: 15 May 1927 Frankfurt, Germany
- Died: 20 July 2003 (aged 76) Gateshead, United Kingdom
- Spouse: Miriam
- Parent: Rabbi Yomtov Lipman Rakow (father)

Religious life
- Religion: Judaism

Jewish leader
- Predecessor: Rabbi Naftoli Shakovitzky
- Successor: Rabbi Shraga Feivel Zimmerman
- Began: 1964
- Ended: 2003

Bezalel Rakow (15 May 1927 – 20 July 2003) was a British Orthodox rabbi who headed Gateshead’s Jewish community. He was the chair of the Council of Torah Sages of Agudas Yisroel of Great Britain.

Born in Frankfurt, Germany into a distinguished rabbinical family, Bezalel Rakow was a direct descendant of Rabbi Yom-Tov Lipmann Heller, (author of the Tosafos Yomtov commentary on the Mishnah). His father, Rabbi Yomtov Lipman Rakow, a pupil of the great Volozhin yeshiva, had been a rosh yeshiva in Frankfurt-on-Main. In 1939, he, aged 10, his parents and his brother Benzion Rakow were granted asylum, and settled in London.

Aged 18, he enrolled in Gateshead Kollel where he obtained rabbinical ordination and gained a reputation as a Talmudic scholar. In 1948, he married Miriam, daughter of Gateshead's then communal rabbi Naftoli Shakovitzky. The couple moved to Montreux, Switzerland, where he took up a position teaching in the local yeshivah. In 1964, following his father-in-law's death, he returned to Gateshead to assume his position, thus becoming one of Orthodox Judaism's recognised world leaders.

In 2002, Rabbi Rakow was at the center of debate between Jewish orthodoxy and the features of modernity that he perceived as threatening orthodox values. When British Chief Rabbi Jonathan Sacks, in his book The Dignity of Difference (2002), expressed the notion that Judaism might learn from other faiths, Rabbi Rakow publicly demanded that Sacks repudiate the thesis of the book and withdraw it from circulation.
