= Shraga Feivel Zimmerman =

American and English rabbi

Rabbi Shraga Feivel Zimmerman

Av Beis Din of Kehillas Federation
- Incumbent
- Assumed office January 2020
- Preceded by: Yaakov Lichtenstein

Rov of Gateshead
- In office April 2008 – January 2020
- Preceded by: Bezalel Rakow
- Succeeded by: Yisroel Mantel

Rov, Khal Bnei Ashkenaz, Monsey
- In office 2001–2008

Rov, K'hal Adath Jeshurun, Monsey
- In office 1996–2001

Personal life
- Born: New Jersey, United States
- Spouse: Chaya Reena Zimmerman
- Education: Mir Yeshiva (Brooklyn)

Religious life
- Religion: Judaism
- Denomination: Haredi

Jewish leader
- Disciple of: Shmuel Berenbaum; Meshulam Dovid Soloveitchik

Shraga Feivel Halevi Zimmerman is an American and English Haredi rabbi who serves as the rov and av beis din of Kehillas Federation in London. He served as the rabbi and av beis din of the Jewish community in Gateshead between 2008 and 2020. He is a posek and is regarded as one of the United Kingdom's most influential Haredi rabbis.

After growing up in Brooklyn, New York City, and serving various rabbinical positions in the United States, he was appointed in April 2008 as the rov and av beis din of the Jewish community in Gateshead. During his tenure, he allowed for a loosening of previous traditions, permitting the opening of the community's first kosher restaurant, and invested in improving social services and children's education. In January 2020, he concluded his tenure in Gateshead and assumed office as the rov and av beis din of Kehillas Federation in London.

== Early life ==
Zimmerman was born in New Jersey and grew up in Borough Park, Brooklyn. He studied at Beer Shmuel in Borough Park, a yeshiva that was founded by his grandfather, Rabbi Yosef Yonah Tzvi Horowitz, who was rabbi of Unsdorf and Frankfurt. He later studied in the Mirrer yeshiva in Flatbush and Rabbi Dovid Soloveitchik's Brisk yeshiva in Jerusalem. He then studied in Kollel Kehillas Yaakov in Monsey, New York. He is a close disciple of Rabbis Shmuel Berenbaum and Meshulam Dovid Soloveitchik.

== Rabbinic career ==
=== United States (1996–2008) ===
Zimmerman served as a Rav for the K'hal Adath Jeshurun community in Monsey for five years, and later as the founding rabbi of Khal Bnei Ashkenaz, the Haredi German Ashkenazic community in Monsey. He also led the smichah program at Ohr Somayach and other activities including a kollel in Lakewood Township, New Jersey, a program for teens, and an Earner-Learner program.

=== Gateshead (2008–2020) ===
In 2008, Zimmerman was appointed as rabbi and av beis din of the Jewish community in Gateshead, an ultra conservative Haredi community of 300 families. He succeeded Bezalel Rakow, who had died in 2003. Per the community's charter, he traveled to Israel for his appointment to be approved by rabbis Yosef Shalom Elyashiv and Aharon Leib Shteinman. He arrived in Gateshead on 6 April, and his induction was attended by an audience of 500, including several Haredi rabbis such as Matisyahu Salomon, Ephraim Padwa and Menachem Mendel Schneebalg.

Upon his arrival, Zimmerman allowed for a loosening of previous traditions which existed under Rakow, allowing individuals greater leeway to make their own decisions. One of the changes he made was to allow the opening of the community's first kosher restaurant, which had previously been opposed due to concerns about unsupervised interaction between the sexes, with the proviso that there would be separate hours for men and women. He cultivated connections with the Gateshead Council and wider society, which contributed to the community's growth. He invested in improving children's education and creating social services such as couples' counselling.

Known locally as "the Rov", he was responsible for answering halachic questions, making communal decisions, and delivering Torah lectures. He spoke at every community celebration and officiated every wedding.

In June 2017, Zimmerman called for the removal of London-based rabbi Joseph Dweck due to his support of homosexuality. He also testified in the trial against pedophile Todros Grynhaus and allowed reporting child abuse to the police.

In February 2018, he cautioned that government intervention in religious education was potentially the gravest challenge faced by British Jews since their expulsion in 1290. The following year, in May 2019, he led a fundraising campaign to raise an additional £2 million for a new mikveh in Gateshead. During his tenure, he answered approximately 200,000 halachic questions which he received from around the world, and delivered approximately 4,000 classes, spoke at 1,500 public occasions, and had over 10,000 meetings with community members.

=== London (2020–present) ===
On 30 June 2019, Zimmerman accepted the position of rov and av beis din of the Federation of Synagogues in London. He made this decision after concluding that his work in Gateshead was largely complete and that the pastoral responsibilities of the community had grown beyond his and his wife's capacities. He took office in January 2020, following the retirement of Dayan Yisroel Lichtenstein. He was succeeded as the rov of Gateshead by Yisroel Mantel of Manhattan, New York in November 2025.

Zimmerman led the construction of a new eruv in Golders Green, which was completed in February 2025.

== Personal ==
Zimmerman is a Levite and is married to Rebbetzin Chaya Reena Zimmerman. Some of their married children live in the United States.

Preceded by Rabbi Bezalel Rakow	ABD Gateshead; 2008-2020	Succeeded by
Preceded by Rabbi Yaakov Lichtenstein	ABD Federation of Synagogues; 2020-	Succeeded by incumbent
