= Benzion Rakow =

Benzion Rakow (1925–1985) was a British communal rabbi and rosh yeshiva of Chayei Olam Yeshiva in Golders Green, London. He was also active in Agudas Yisroel of Great Britain.

Born in Frankfurt, Germany into a distinguished rabbinical family, Benzion Rakow was a direct descendant of Rabbi Yom-Tov Lipmann Heller, (author of the Tosefot Yom-Tov commentary on the Mishnah). His father, rabbi Yom-Tov Lipman Rakow, a pupil of the great Volozhin Yeshiva, was a rosh yeshiva in Frankfurt-on-Main. His brother, Rabbi Bezalel Rakow was Rabbi of Gateshead. After his death, his rabbinical position was filled by his eldest son, Rabbi Yom-Tov Lipman Rakow.
