= Café Moment bombing =

2002 Palestinian suicide bombing in Jerusalem

- Part of the Second Intifada militancy campaign
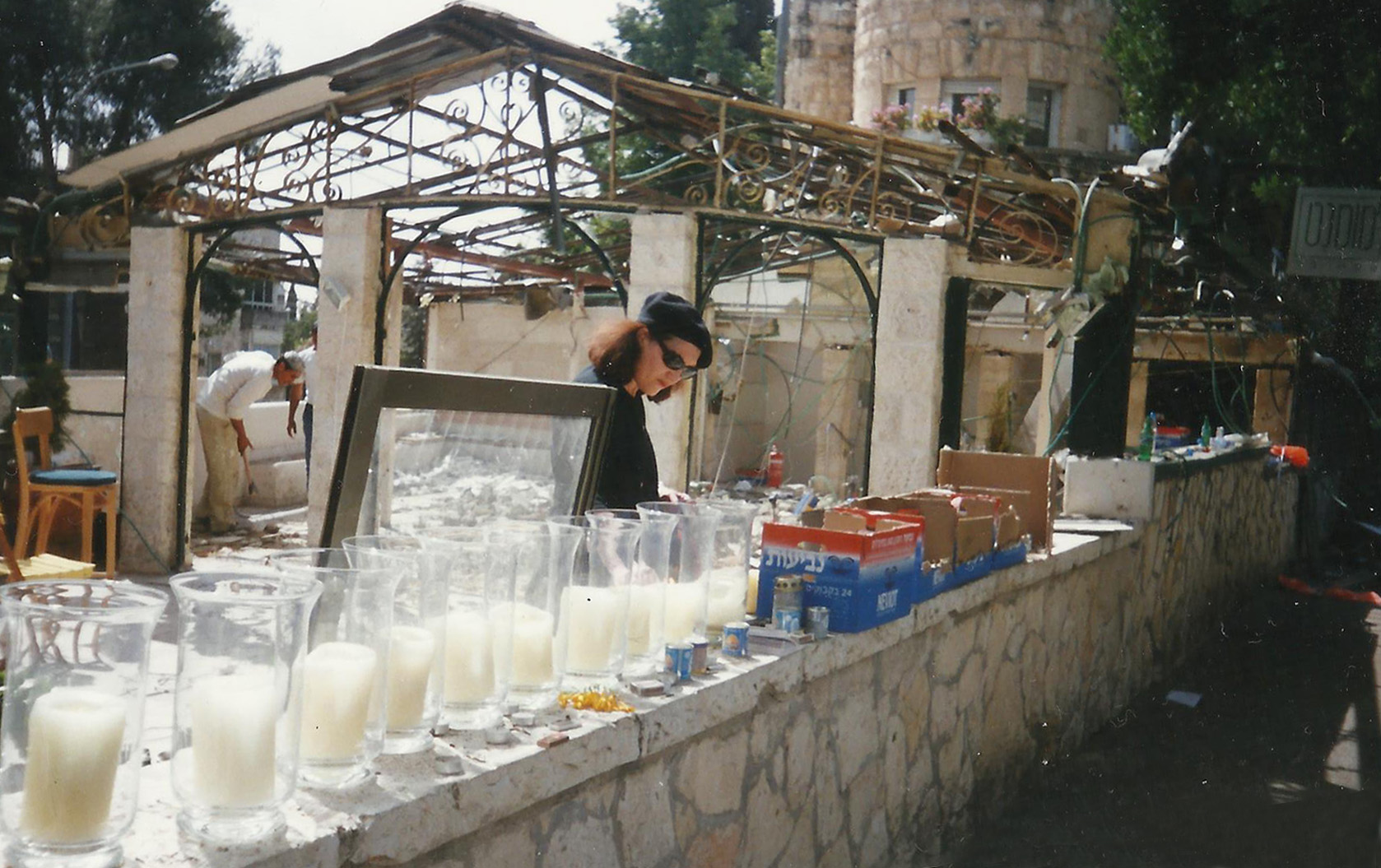

- The attack site
- Location: 31°46′29″N 35°13′3″E; Jerusalem
- Date: March 9, 2002; 24 years ago 10:33 pm (GMT+2)
- Attack type: Suicide bombing
- Weapon: Explosive belt
- Deaths: 11 Israeli civilians (+1 bomber)
- Injuries: 54 Israeli civilians
- Perpetrator: Hamas claimed responsibility

The Café Moment bombing was a Palestinian suicide bombing of a coffee shop in downtown Jerusalem, that killed 11 Israeli civilians and left 65 others wounded. It was carried out on March 9, 2002, during the Second Intifada.

== Attack ==
On March 9, 2002, shortly before 22:30, a Palestinian suicide bomber entered the "Café Moment" coffee shop in the Rehavia neighborhood of Jerusalem at the corner of Gaza Street and Ben-Maimon Street, situated about 100 meters from the residence of the Prime Minister. At the time, this was one of Jerusalem's most popular centers of recreation. Immediately after entering the building, the suicide bomber detonated the powerful explosive device hidden underneath his clothes. The force of the blast completely destroyed the shop, instantly killed 11 Israeli civilians and injured 65 people, 10 of them severely.

== Perpetrators ==
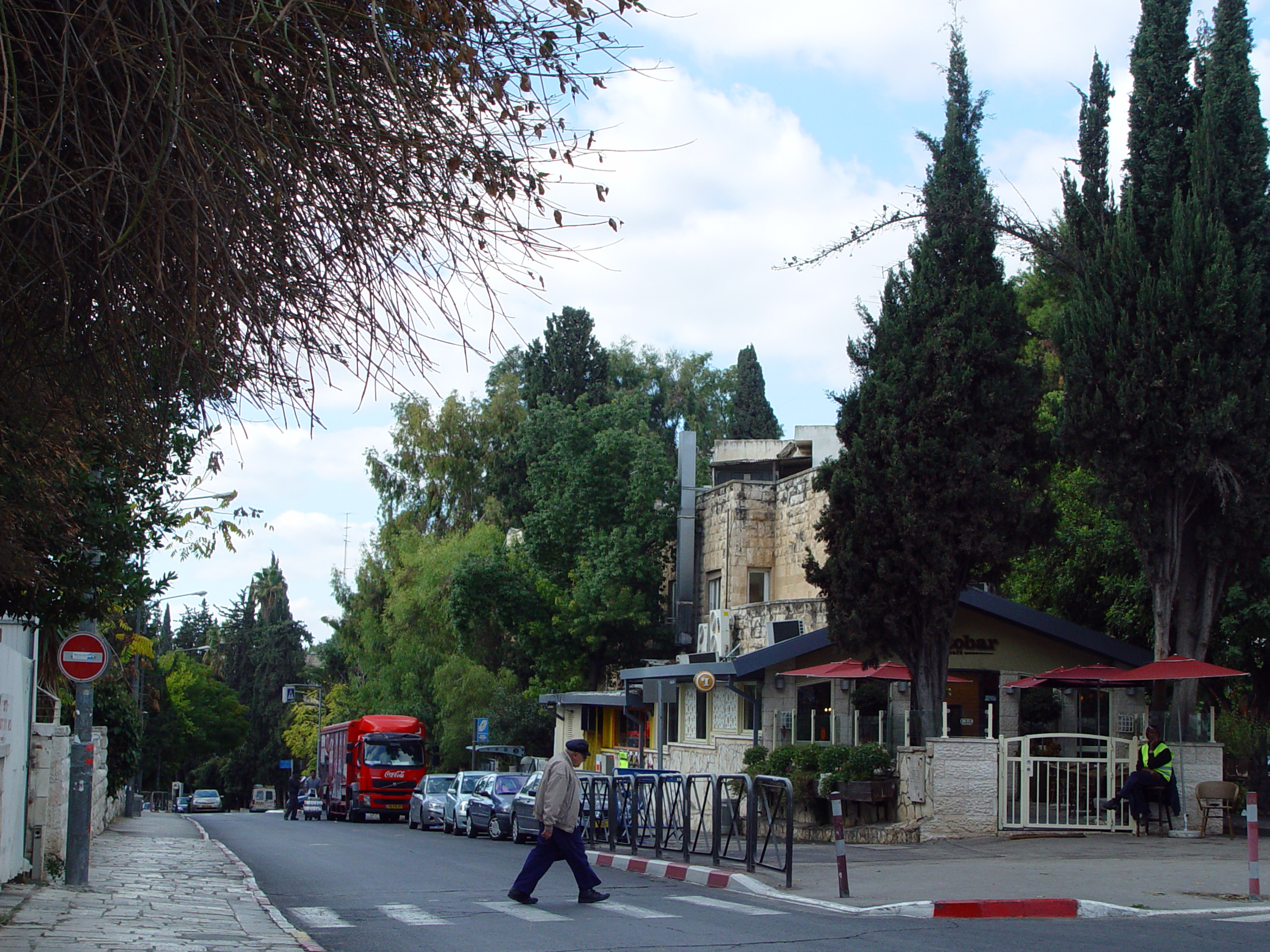
Cafe Moment, 2009

Hamas claimed responsibility for the attack.

== Investigation ==
On August 17, 2002, the Israeli security forces arrested the Hamas cell members who carried out the attack. The militants were residents of East Jerusalem. Due to their status as permanent residents in Israel, they carried Israeli blue identity cards, which allowed them to work in Israel and to easily travel in Israel without being suspected. While the Israeli security forces investigated the incident they found out that the cell members, who were referred to in the media as "The Silwan cell", were responsible for a series of attacks against Israeli civilians, including the attack at Café Moment, which in total killed 35 Israeli civilians and injured 200 others. According to the Israeli security forces the cell operated in accordance with the instructions they received from the Hamas headquarters in Ramallah, which instructed them to locate a crowded public space to carry out a mass-casualty suicide attack.

In October 2011, the Silwan cell members were all released from prison as part of the Gilad Shalit prisoner exchange.

=== Lawsuit ===
A lawsuit was filed against the Arab Bank for financing the attack.

== Aftermath ==
The attack took place during March 2002, in which Israel suffered the highest fatalities rate of the Second Intifada – 111 Israeli soldiers and civilians were killed during that month in over a dozen militant attacks carried out throughout the country. These attacks peaked on March 27, 2002, with the Passover massacre, which led to the Israeli government's decision to launch a major military campaign aimed at the Palestinian militancy infrastructure in the West Bank.

== See also ==
- List of terrorist incidents, 2002
