= Yeshivat Rambam Maimonides Academy =

Orthodox Jewish dual-curriculum day school

Coordinates: 39.353084°N 76.686501°W

Yeshivat Rambam Maimonides Academy was an elite Orthodox Jewish dual-curriculum day school and yeshiva in Baltimore, Maryland. It encompassed kindergarten through twelfth grade, as well as an early childhood center.

== History ==
The school was founded in 1991. Yeshivat Rambam grew over the years, adding several grades, outgrowing its original location on Pimlico Road and purchasing the former Har Sinai Congregation property on Park Heights Avenue when that congregation moved to Owings Mills. Eventually, Yeshivat Rambam added a middle school and high school, and it built enrollment to about 400 students. Its first high school class graduated in 2001.

During its existence, Yeshivat Rambam earned recognition as a National Blue Ribbon School of Excellence for its high scholastic performance, as measured by SAT and other standardized tests, consistently exceeding 95th percentile across all measures. The school had a 0% dropout rate and an average student:teacher ratio of 8:1. Its founding Head of School was Dr. Rita Shloush.

In the mid to late 2000s, Yeshivat Rambam ran into financial difficulties, having accumulated significant debt due to its resource-intensive educational strategies and other factors, and those problems sparked annual rumors about its doors closing. Donations dropped off during the Great Recession and about 60 Rambam families had moved to Israel since the school was founded in 1991, eroding its base in Park Heights. In addition, the school became gender-segregated, with the girls division remaining on the Park Heights campus and the boys division moving to the nearby Jewish Community Center.

The school also experienced public relations difficulties with respect to a pledged donation. In 2007, Dr. Avraham Cohen pledged $500,000 to the school. When an article appeared on the school's website announcing the pledge, the doctor, reportedly a neurosurgeon, was recognized by several Shawano County, Wisconsin businessmen as the leader of a cult known as the Samanta Roy Institute of Science and Technology, Inc. Affidavits were filed in the Wisconsin case, with the defense denying all claims of similarity.

In April 2011, the school obtained a building from Bnos Yisroel, a private girls-only Jewish school, through a building exchange. Yeshivat Rambam's board was able to sell the building to a financing entity for $1,000,000, which they used to pay the debt owed by the school.

On May 9, 2011, the executive board announced that Yeshivat Rambam would close in June 2011, at the end of the academic year. Originally, the school had announced in January that the high school grades would be ending, and provided services to help students transfer to other area schools. The combined total of students in the boys' and girls' high schools was one hundred.

== Successor ==
Following the permanent closure of Yeshivat Rambam, some of its former faculty members remained to found another Orthodox Jewish day school in the area, Ohr Chadash Academy. Unlike Yeshivat Rambam, the school serves only preschool through eighth grades, but initially followed identical curriculum and principles. The school has since shifted to better fit into the larger Baltimore Orthodox community, going so far as to remove the term "Modern Orthodox" from its mission statement.

== America Eats for Israel campaign ==
In 2004, the school began a campaign to raise funds to help Israeli survivors of terror attacks. At the time, the campaign existed only in Baltimore, but by 2008, it had grown into an effort including several schools in New Jersey as well. Coordinated by students, restaurants were asked to participate by donating ten percent of their sales for a day to a chosen charity. Over the span of the campaign, student-led efforts raised $50,000 for Almagor (Israel's Terror Victims Association) and the Koby Mandell Foundation.

== Notable alumni ==
- Adam J. Neuman, Chief of Staff, Special Advisor to the President for the Baltimore Ravens.
