= Gaza Street =

Street in Rehavia, Jerusalem

Coordinates: 31.7721°N 35.2137°E

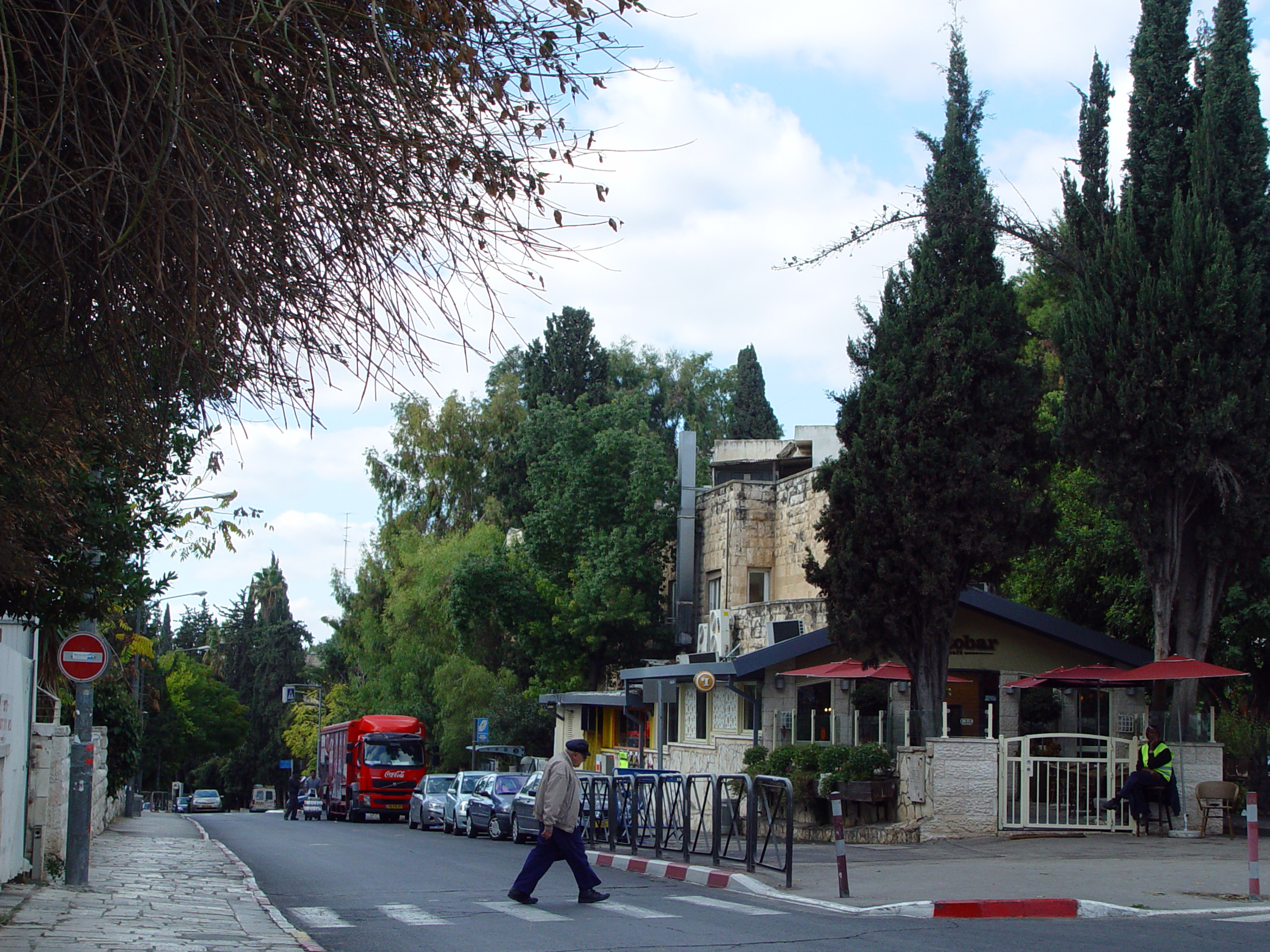
Gaza Street, Jerusalem.

Gaza Street or Gaza Road (Hebrew: דרך עזה - Derech Aza) is a main street in the Rehavia neighborhood of Jerusalem.

== History ==
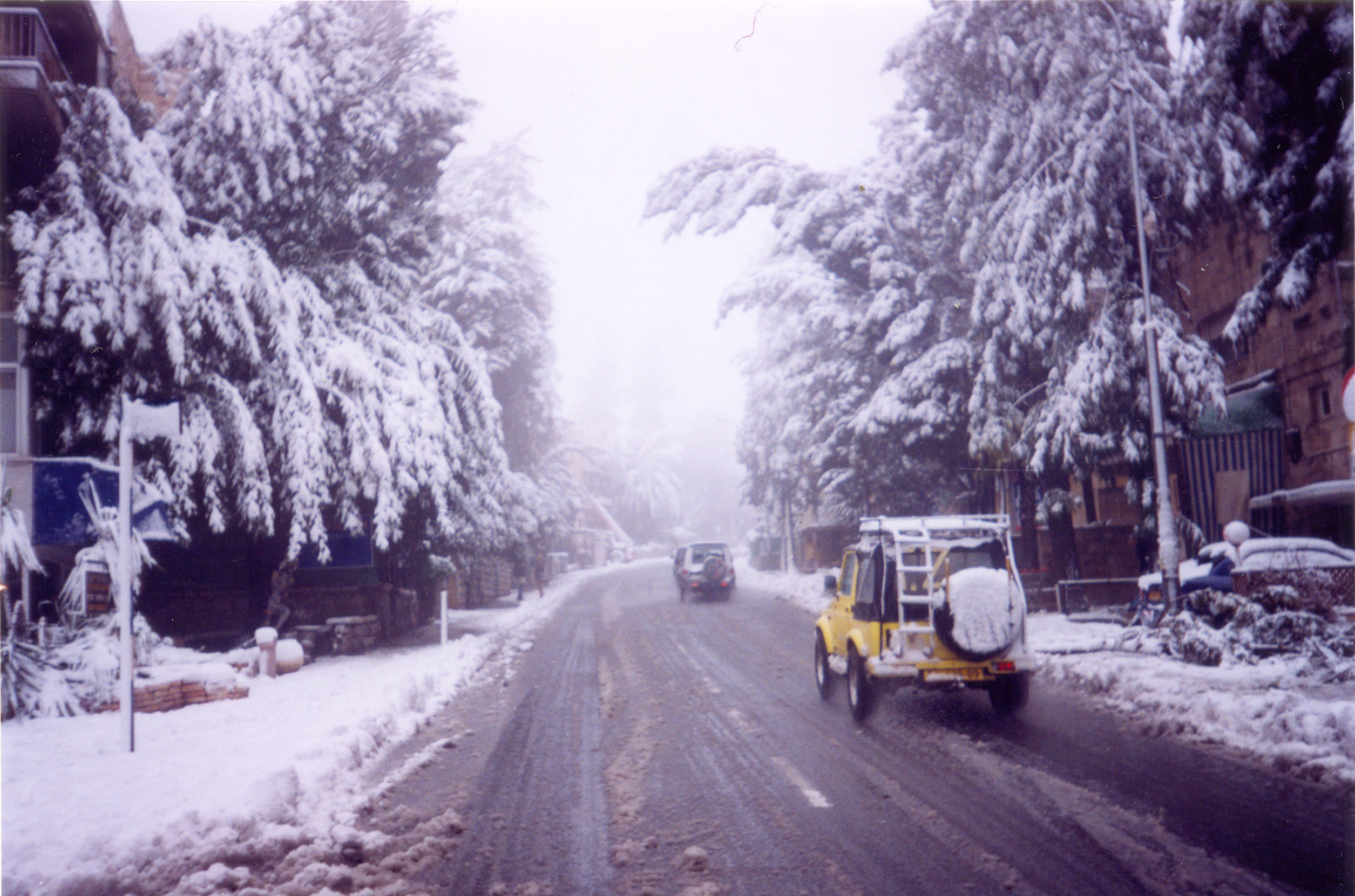
Gaza Street in the snow, 2002.

The street is named Gaza Street because it was built on a part of the historical road from Jaffa Gate of the Old City of Jerusalem to the south Mediterranean coast, including Gaza City. During the first half of the twentieth century, most of the street's residents were wealthy German Jews (e.g., minister Yosef Burg), who kept up their European lifestyle and language even calling the street "Gaza Straße". Thus, the name of the intersection of Gaza and Rabbi Chaim Berlin streets, "Gaza-Berlin Corner", becoming a slang term describing the neighborhood's population.

During the Gaza war, activists had put stickers over the word "Gaza" on its street signs and replaced it with names of Israeli towns which suffered losses during the October 7th, 2023 massacre.

== Landmarks ==
Aside from being important for commuting, it holds its own commercial and cultural value. The official residence of Israel's prime minister is located on Balfour Street, which leads off Gaza Street, and therefore demonstrations often take place at the Paris Square across from the official residence. In 2007, the square was symbolically renamed the "Freedom for Jonathan Pollard Square".

Gaza Street begins at the intersection of Paris Square, King George, Keren HaYesod and Rambam streets, and it spans until the intersection with Rabbi Yitzhak HaLevi Herzog Avenue next to the Valley of the Cross ("Emeq HaMatzleva") and the Monastery of the Cross. There are many cafés, restaurants and other commercial activity on the street.

== Architecture ==
Most of Gaza Street's buildings are designed in the Bauhaus style common to the neighborhood and are faced with Jerusalem stone. Most are apartment buildings, no taller than four floors and featuring gardens.

== Israeli-Palestinian conflict ==
In March 2002, a suicide bomber struck Café Moment, located on the street, killing eleven people. Another attack by a Palestinian suicide bomber two years after killed eleven and injured over 50 people on a bus.
