= Kiryat Shmuel, Jerusalem =

Neighborhood in Jerusalem

Coordinates: 31°46′10″N 35°12′40″E

Kiryat Shmuel Hebrew: קרית שמואל
- Neighborhood of Jerusalem
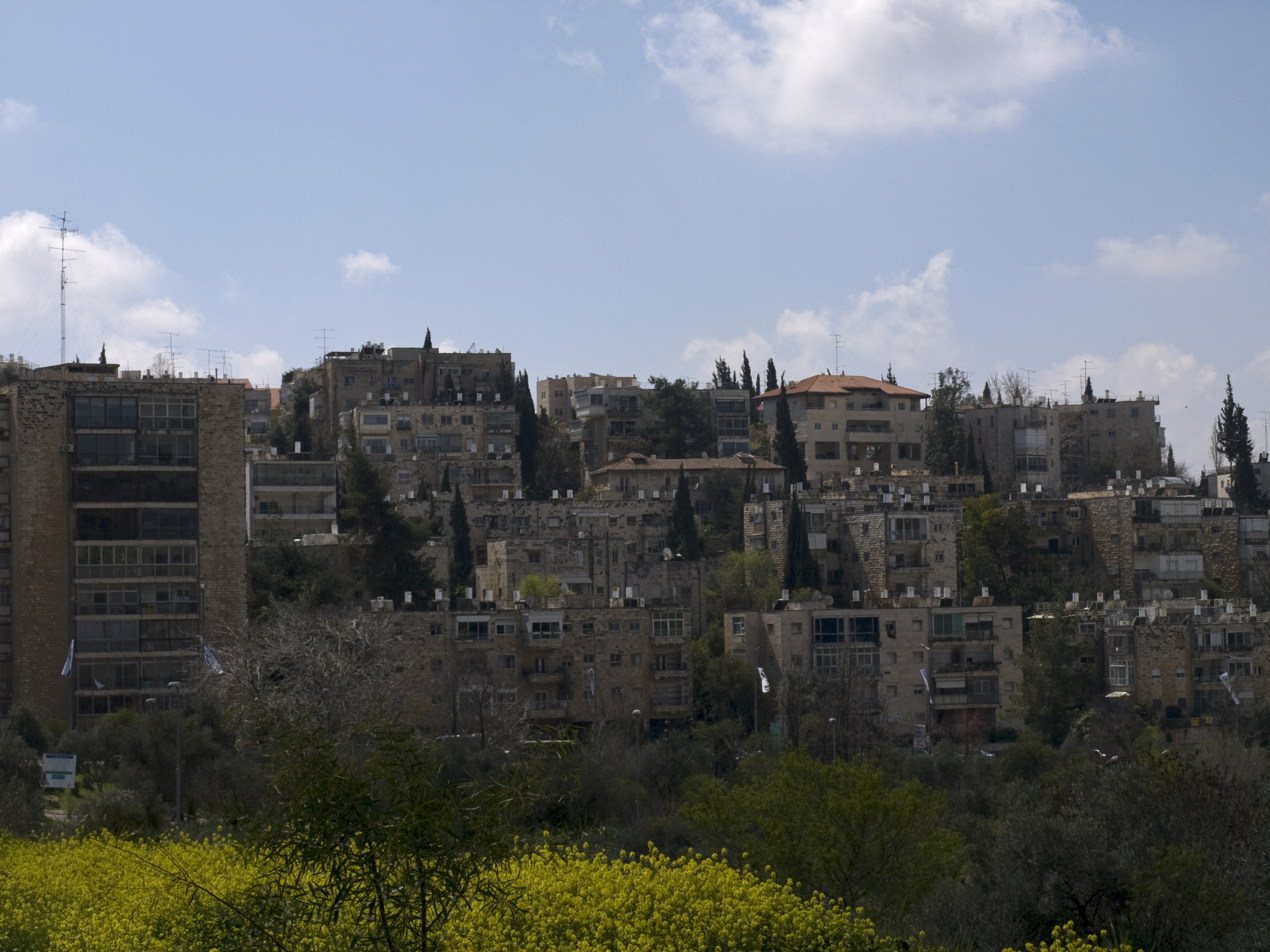
- Overview of Kiryat Shmuel from the Monastery of the Cross
- Interactive map of Kiryat Shmuel
- Country: Israel
- District: Jerusalem District
- City: Jerusalem

Kiryat Shmuel (Hebrew: קריית שמואל) is a neighborhood in central Jerusalem founded in 1926. It is named for Rabbi Shmuel Salant, the Ashkenazi Chief Rabbi of Jerusalem in 1878–1909. Kiryat Shmuel is located between Rehavia and Katamon.

== History ==
The land was purchased with money from a charitable fund established in honor of the rabbi's ninetieth birthday which also provided loans for building homes. The regulations of the society stipulated that the members be at least eighteen years of age, and that they conduct themselves "in accordance with the Torah, both the written and the orally transmitted."

Kiryat Shmuel was dedicated on May 8, 1929, in the presence of the Ashkenazi chief rabbi, Rabbi Abraham Isaac Kook. Three months later, many properties were damaged in the Arab rioting that erupted in Jerusalem. Forty houses were built by the beginning of World War II, and another ten were completed by the 1948 Israeli-Arab War.

== Landmarks ==
=== Beit Kadima ===
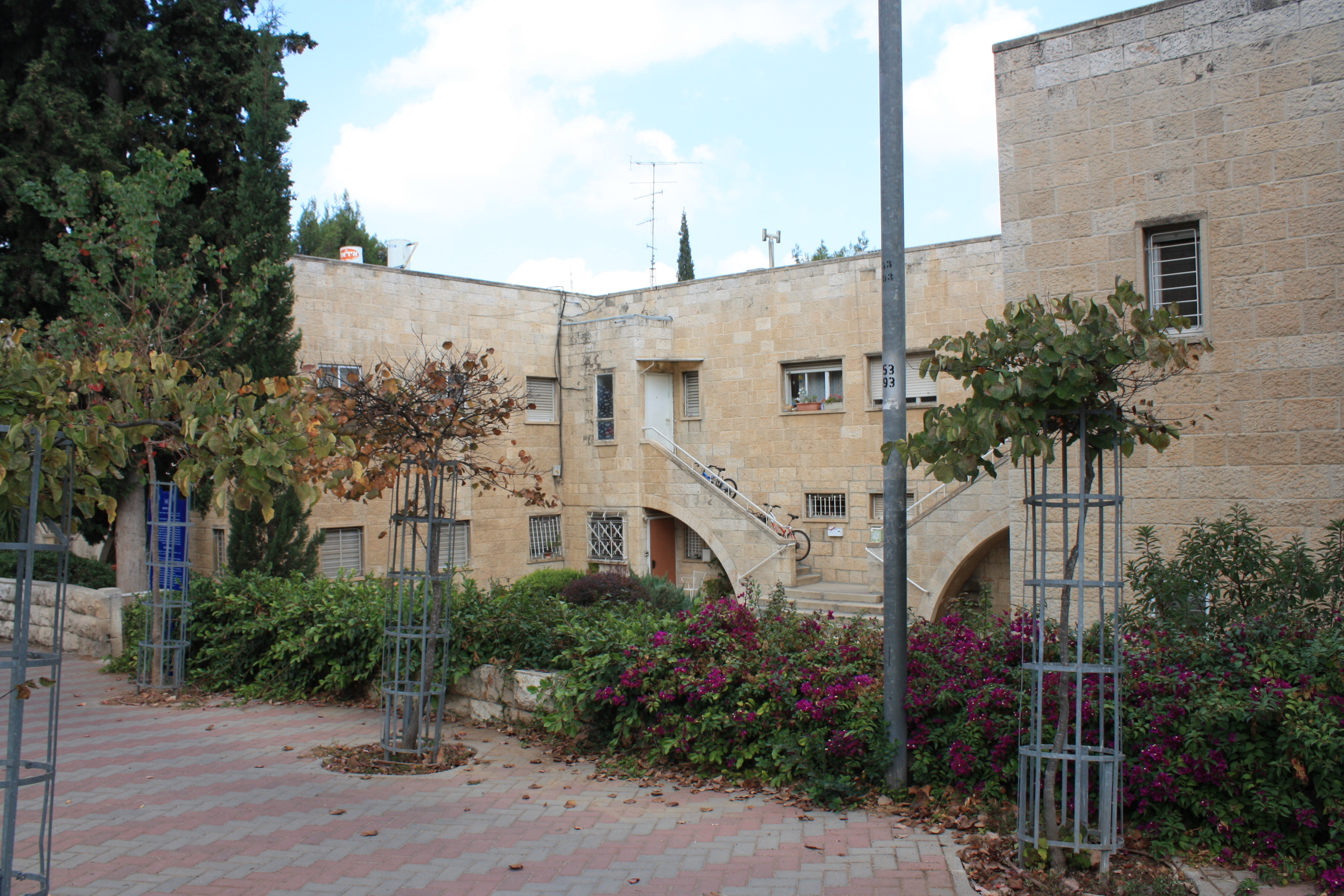
Beit Kadima

=== St Anthony Monastery/British tribunal ===
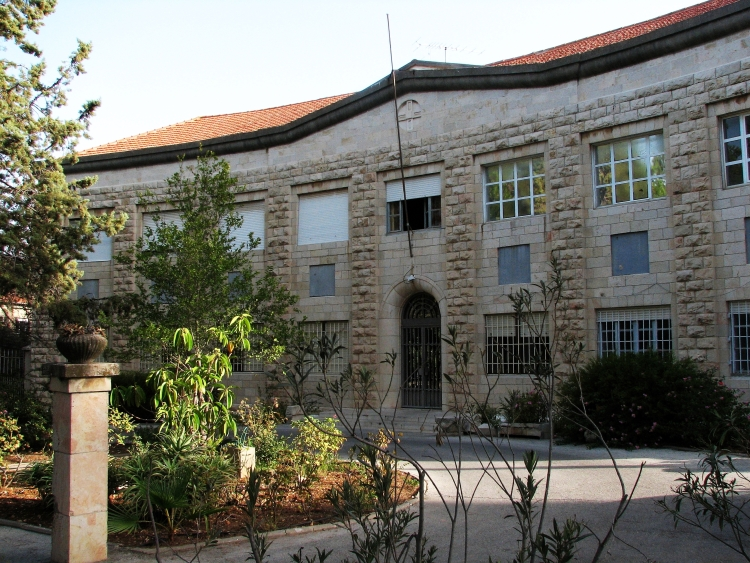
Supreme Military Tribunal of the British Mandate

The imposing building across from the President's House in Kiryat Shmuel is the St Anthony Monastery, designed in 1936 by the Italian architect Antonio Barluzzi as a Franciscan school for Arab girls, or Collegio Sant'Antonio in Italian. When World War II broke out, the British Mandatory authorities confiscated the building as enemy property. It was fortified and turned into the Supreme Military Tribunal of the British Mandate. Members of the Lehi and Etzel Jewish underground were tried here, and some were sentenced to death.

== Archaeology ==
=== Aharoni Street burial cave ===
In 2009, an ancient Jewish burial cave dating back to the Second Temple period was documented on Aharoni Street in the Kiryat Shmuel neighborhood. The cave, carved into soft limestone bedrock, featured a square central burial chamber with six arched kokhim and an entrance sealed by a square stone. Some of the kokhim were open, containing ossuaries and a small number of bones, indicating potential past robbery and intentional destruction by robbers. Seven complete ossuaries, fragments of several others, and ossuary lids were concentrated on benches.

The ossuaries, primarily made of soft limestone, displayed incision marks and faint pigment traces. A distinctive ossuary made from hard limestone was sealed with a flat lid attached by a bronze nail. It bore a Hebrew inscription of two lines: “אלכסא בר שלום ברת אלכסא/ארור שיטלני ממקומי” (Alexa son of Shalom daughter of Alexa Cursed (be whoever) takes me from my place). The rarity of such curses indicated a genuine fear of disturbance. The deceased Alexa expressed a wish to be related to his mother's father, suggesting a person of higher status. The curse aimed to prevent the removal of his bones, making this inscription longer and more informative than typical ossuary inscriptions.

=== Harlap Street burial cave ===
Another Jewish burial cave from Second Temple Period was discovered in 2012 during construction work in Harlap Street. Situated near the intersection of Harlap and HaPalmah Streets, the cave was part of a cluster of rock-hewn burial caves. The Harlap burial cave featured an elaborate entrance and chambers with kokhim, reflecting the characteristic style of that era. It underwent modifications, possibly in the late Roman or Byzantine period. Inside, a few dozen Greek graffiti inscriptions dating back to the 1890s were found, bearing the names of Greek men. These inscriptions were likely added by Greek Orthodox pilgrims, suggesting the cave held spiritual or historical significance for them.

== See also ==
- Architecture in Israel
- 1929 Palestine riots
