= Av Beit Din =

Second-highest-ranking member of the Sanhedrin during the Second Temple period

The av beit din (Hebrew: אָב בֵּית דִּין, romanized: ʾāḇ bēṯ din, lit. 'chief of the court, chief justice'), abbreviated abd (אב״ד avad), was the second-highest-ranking member of the Sanhedrin during the Second Temple period and served as an assistant to the nasi. The av beit din was known as the "Master of the Court;" he was considered the most learned and important of these seventy members.

Menahem the Essene served as av beit din in the 1st century BC before abdicating to "serve the King" in 20 BC. The House of Shammai attained complete ascendency over the Sanhedrin from 9 CE until Gamaliel became nasi in 30 CE. The post of av beit din was eventually filled since the Babylonian Talmud states that Joshua ben Hananiah was the av beit din in Baba Kamma 74b and Nathan the Babylonian was av beit din in Horayot 13b in the Babylonian Talmud. The Jerusalem Talmud tells the story of how Gamaliel II was deposed and Eleazar ben Azariah replaced him as Nasi. After Gamaliel was reinstated, Eleazar ben Azariah was made av beit din. The parallel story in the Babylonian Talmud has Eleazar ben Azariah remaining as a co-nasi with Gamaliel.

In Israeli law, the term is used to describe the presiding judge.

== Modern usage ==
In modern times the title is often used as an honorific for the presiding rabbi of a beth din "rabbinical court", who is typically the salaried rabbi of the local Jewish community and usually a posek or "decisor" of Halakha. It is also abbreviated as avad when it is after the name of the Chief Rabbi of a national Jewish community. It can also refer to the most senior member of the court.

Although the title av beit din historically is higher than that of rosh beit din, the rankings are sometimes reversed. The London Beth Din specifically addresses this, saying: "The Chief Rabbi formally holds the title of Av Beth Din" but that "Due to his extensive workload as well as convention of his office" he's "not generally personally involved;" the rosh beth din runs the court.

== Rosh Beit Din ==
The holder of the title rosh beth din (Hebrew: ראש בית דין, lit. 'Head of the Court', abbreviated ראב״ד ravad) is often the person to whom outsiders look for rulings. In 1934, Yehezkel Abramsky was given this title. Federation of Synagogues' Yisroel Yaakov Lichtenstein used this title when he published a major response in 2009, even though he was ABD. In smaller communities, the avad also serves as the ravad.
