= Kehillas Federation =

British Jewish organization

- Formation: 1887; 139 years ago
- Headquarters: Hendon
- Location: London, United Kingdom
- Av beis din: Shraga Feivel Zimmerman
- Website: federation.org.uk
- Formerly called: Federation of Synagogues

Kehillas Federation is a British Jewish organisation with headquarters in Hendon, London. It comprises a network of 19 constituent and seven affiliated communities.

As well as looking after its member synagogues, the Federation has a beis din, a Burial Society and runs a Kosher Food Licensing organisation that issues local kosher catering licences as well as undertaking product certification at home and abroad.

The Federation Beis Din’s dayonim are internationally recognised authorities and are available to discuss halachic matters. As a formal beis din they hear civil cases and deal with matrimonial matters.

The current av beis din (chief rabbi) of the Federation is Rabbi Shraga Feivel Zimmerman.

== History ==
The Federation was first established in 1887 as the Federation of Synagogues, primarily due to the vision and efforts of Samuel Montagu MP (later to become the first Lord Swaythling). Montagu, a prosperous banker who was pious and generous as well as practical, saw a need to unify the numerous small and mostly ill-housed congregations and chevras that had mushroomed in London’s East End following the mass influx of refugees from antisemitic terror in Imperial Russia.

The relationship between the newcomers and the existing Anglicised community was an uncomfortable one; the immigrants suspected the Orthodoxy of the English Jews, while the latter, who lived and worshipped in greater affluence, tended to look down on their less fortunate brethren – who were by now a majority, but with no effective say in community affairs.

Within half a century the pre-eminent Anglo-Jewish Historian Cecil Roth was able to write: "The Federation of Synagogues is ... amongst the greatest and most generous Jewish religious organisations in the world. By its insistence on traditional values and by its deep sympathy with every Jewish cause, it has swung itself into the mainstream of Jewish history."

More recently, another Anglo-Jewish historian, Geoffrey Alderman made this evaluation: "The Federation has experienced a remarkable renaissance in recent years. It's in a far better state now than it was in 1987, with renewed growth in greater London and in Manchester and with what is arguably the most intellectually prestigious Beis Din in Europe. Lord Samuel Montagu's model for the Federation was to provide central services for small kehillos who wished to retain their independence while enjoying the support of a communal structure. This is exactly what is happening today—the younger generations do not want great cathedral synagogues, they want small, cosy shtiebels in which they can play a leading role."

In 2023, the Federation rebranded as Kehillas Federation.

== Presidents ==
1887: Nathan Rothschild
1888: Samuel Montagu
1911: Louis Montagu
1928: Morry Davis
1945: Aaron Wright
1948: Jack Goldberg
1951: Morris Lederman
1989: Arnold Cohen
2001: Alan Finlay
2014: Andrew Cohen

== Interaction with government ==
In 1946 Rabbi Dr Yaacov Kopul Rosen, representing the Federation, testified before the Anglo-American Commission of Inquiry on Palestine, asking them not to "play politics with the remnants of the Jewish people."

In 2019, there was a need to interact with the UK government regarding gender separation of religious schools, writing to Education Secretary Damian Hinds that "Under no circumstances will Charedi schools dilute their passionately held beliefs."
