= Rehavia =

Neighborhood in Jerusalem, Israel

Rehavia רחביה
- Neighborhood of Jerusalem
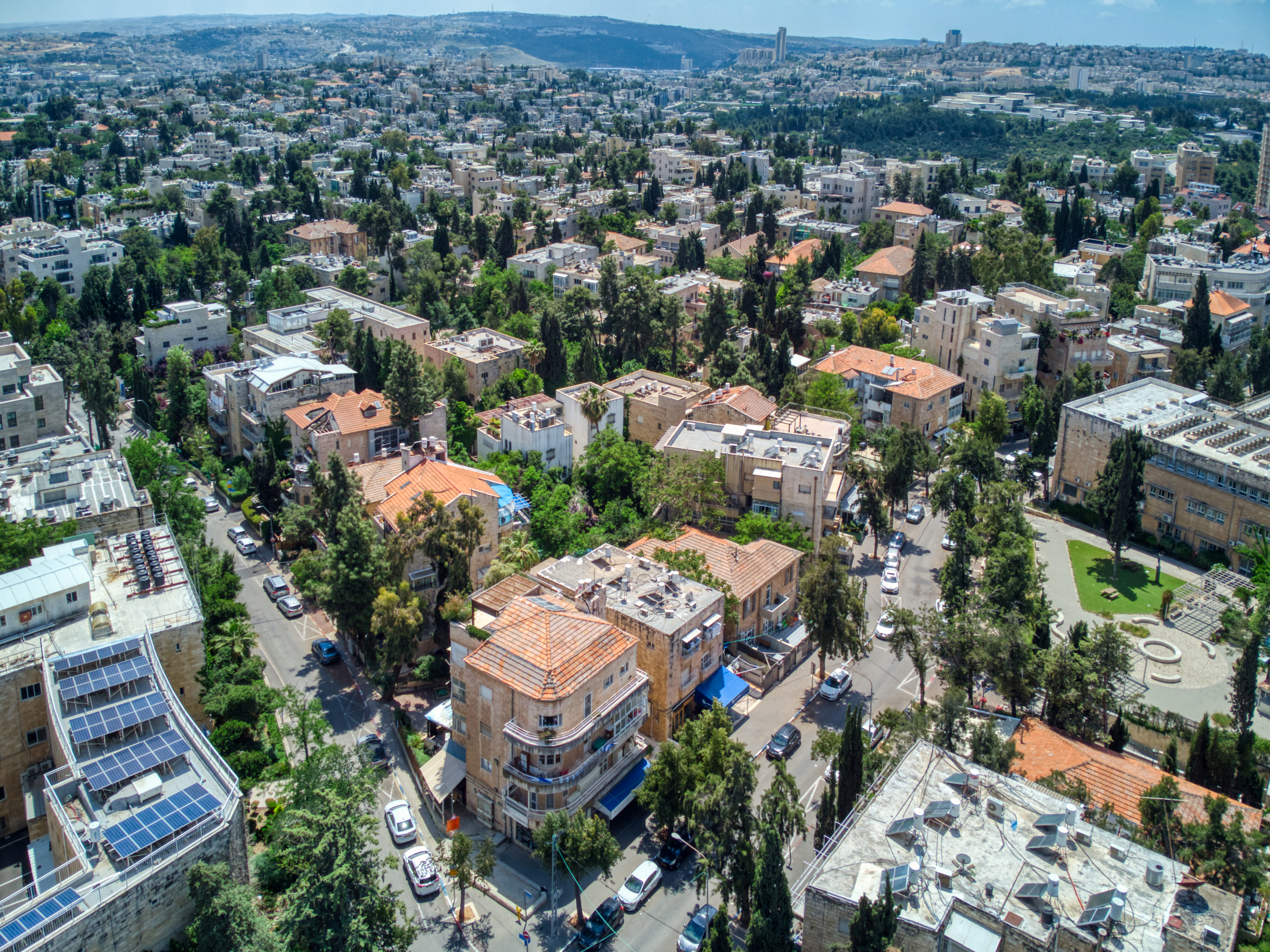
- Rehavia from above

- Location within Jerusalem
- Coordinates: 31°46′28.11″N 35°12′43.19″E
- District: Jerusalem District
- City: Jerusalem
- Founded: 1922
- Founder: Jewish National Fund

Rehavia or Rechavia (Hebrew: רחביה, Arabic: رحافيا) is an upscale neighbourhood in Jerusalem. It is bordered by Nachlaot and Sha'arei Hesed to the north, Talbiya and Kiryat Shmuel to the south, and the Valley of the Cross to the west.

Rehavia was established in the early 1920s on lands leased from the Greek Orthodox Church. It was designed by the German-born Jewish architect Richard Kauffmann, who envisioned it as a garden suburb inspired by garden city principles and the International Style. The neighbourhood is marked by its tranquil character, achieved through narrow, curved streets intended to minimise traffic and commercial activity, which was limited to main streets. Early on, it attracted German-Jewish immigrants, affluent Sephardic families, and key leaders of the Yishuv, earning a reputation as an aristocratic enclave. The neighbourhood has been associated with yekke culture.

In the modern era, Rehavia remains a desirable residential area, known for its high property values. It continues to host many academics, doctors, judges, and public officials. The neighbourhood is home to national institutions such as the Jewish Agency, Jewish National Fund, and Keren Hayesod, and the home of former Prime Minister Levi Eshkol, and Beit Aghion – the Prime Minister's official residence. Historical buildings include the original residence of President Yitzhak Ben-Zvi, the Yad Ben-Zvi institute, Jason's Tomb, the Great Synagogue and the Yeshurun Central Synagogue.

== Name ==
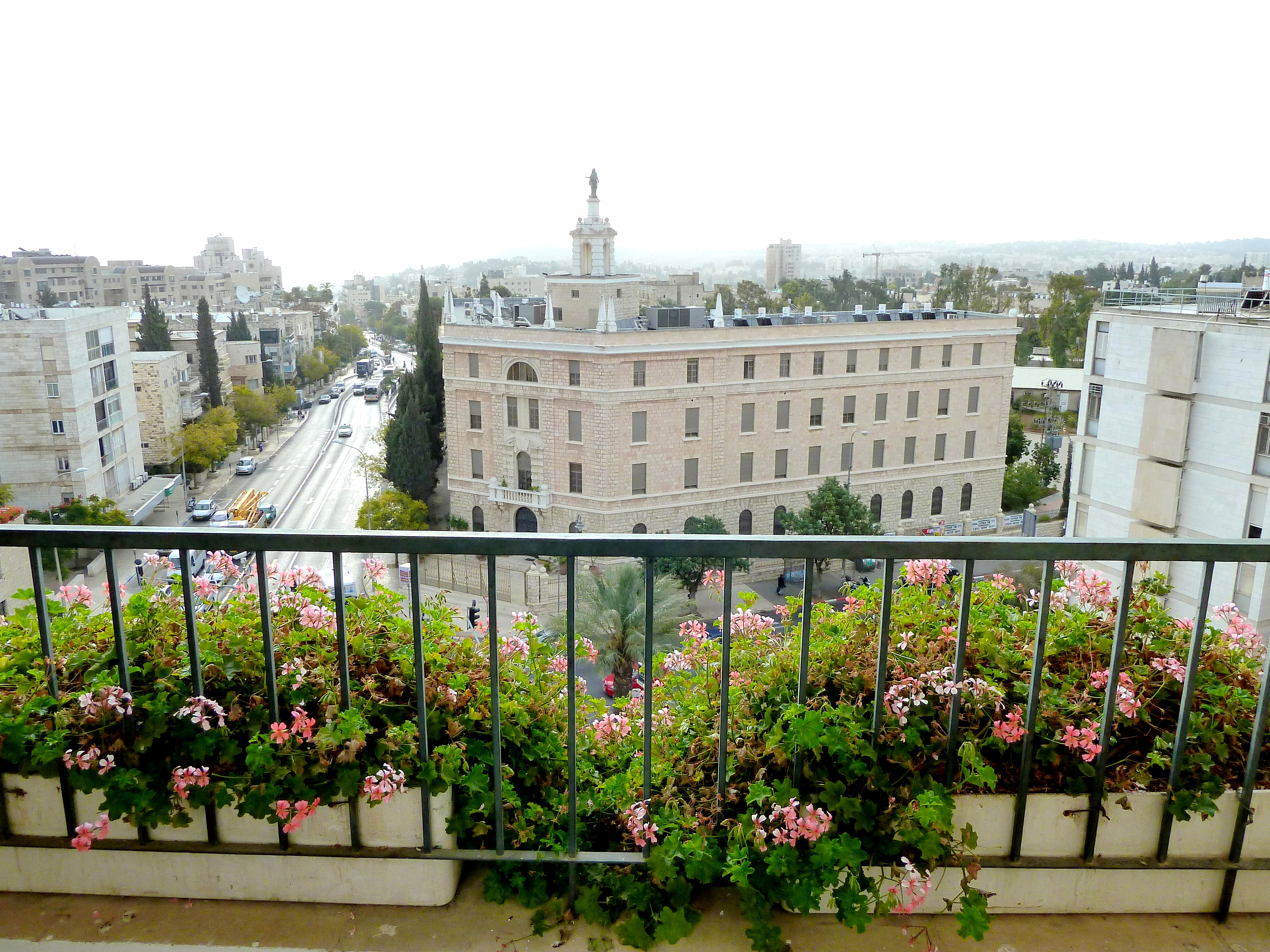
Jerusalem Terra Sancta College on Keren Hayesod Street, Rehavia

The neighborhood was named by Eliezer Yellin, its first inhabitant and one of its early architects, after Moses' grandson, "Rehavia".

== History ==
Rehavia was established on a large plot of land purchased in 1921 from the Greek Orthodox Church by the Palestine Land Development Company (PLDC). The first house, built for Eliezer and Thelma Yellin, was completed in 1924. At the time, the area was known in Arabic as Ginzaria, a native Jerusalem plant, also spelled Janjirieh.

The Jewish National Fund (JNF) bought the land and commissioned the German-Jewish architect Richard Kauffmann to design a garden neighborhood. Kauffmann, who referred to it as the Janziriah project, prepared plans for a neighbourhood featuring homes surrounded by gardens and an orderly, but not too strict, grid of streets and footpaths on either sides of a main boulevard, avoiding an excessive sense of symmetry.

For legal reasons the land was transferred back to the PLDC in exchange for lands in the Jezreel Valley, but the JNF retained some real-estate in the neighborhood. The Gymnasia Rehavia high school, Yeshurun Synagogue, and the Jewish Agency building were built on this land, overlooking the Old City. Rehavia's general outline was modelled after the garden cities of Europe (especially Germany, e.g. the quarters of Dahlem or Grunewald in Berlin), while the architecture of the buildings shows an emphasis on the International Style popular at the time.

The first phase, called Rehavia Aleph, was bordered by King George Street to the east, Ramban Street to the south, Ussishkin Street to the west, and Keren Kayemet Street to the north. To preserve the quiet character, the neighborhood association allowed commercial businesses only on the two main roads at the neighborhood's edges. The roads open to traffic were deliberately built narrow, to keep them less busy and thus quieter. The main, tree-lined boulevard which bisected the neighborhood was open to pedestrian traffic only. Later expansion was primarily to the south, in the direction of Gaza Street.

The prime minister's official residence is "Aghion House", at No. 3 Balfour Street, on the corner with Smolenskin Street.

== Demographics ==
When the Ethiopian emperor Haile Selassie was exiled from Ethiopia in 1936, he lived for a short time on Al-Harizi Street. Rehavia became known as a neighborhood of upper-class Ashkenazi Jews, home to professors and intellectuals, particularly émigrés from Germany. Many of the country's early leaders lived in Rehavia: David Ben-Gurion, Israel's first prime minister, who lived on Ben Maimon street; Zionist leader Arthur Ruppin; Menachem Ussishkin, head of the Jewish National Fund; Golda Meir, Israel's fourth prime minister; Daniel Auster, the first Jewish mayor of Jerusalem, and philosophers Hugo Bergmann and Gershon Scholem. Among the government ministers who made their home in Rehavia were Dov Yosef and Yosef Burg.

== Landmarks ==
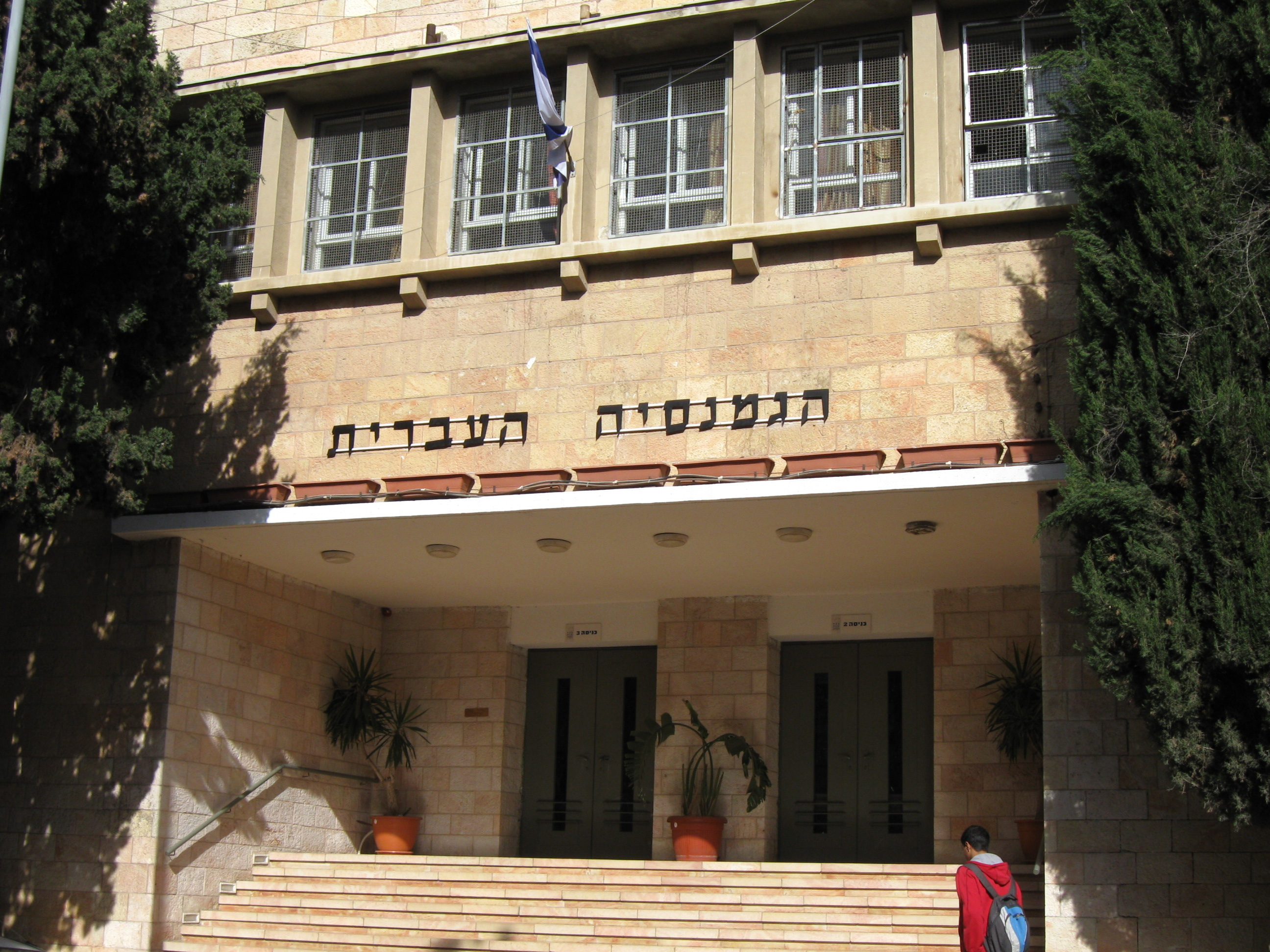
Gymnasia Rehavia High School

Landmark buildings in Rehavia include the headquarters of the Jewish Agency for Israel, the windmill on Ramban Street, and the Ratisbonne Monastery. Gymnasia Rehavia, the country's second modern high school (after Gymnasia Herzliya in Tel Aviv) was built on Keren Kayemet Street in 1928. Yitzhak Ben Zvi, who was to become the second president of Israel, and his future wife, Rachel Yanait, were teachers there.

In the center of historic Rehavia is Yad Ben-Zvi, a research institute established by Ben-Zvi. Jason's Tomb, a monumental Jewish burial complex from the Second Temple period, was discovered during construction work on Alfasi Street. The Schocken library in Rehavia, assembled by the German-Jewish editor Salman Schocken, houses the largest collection of German books in the country.

== Street names ==
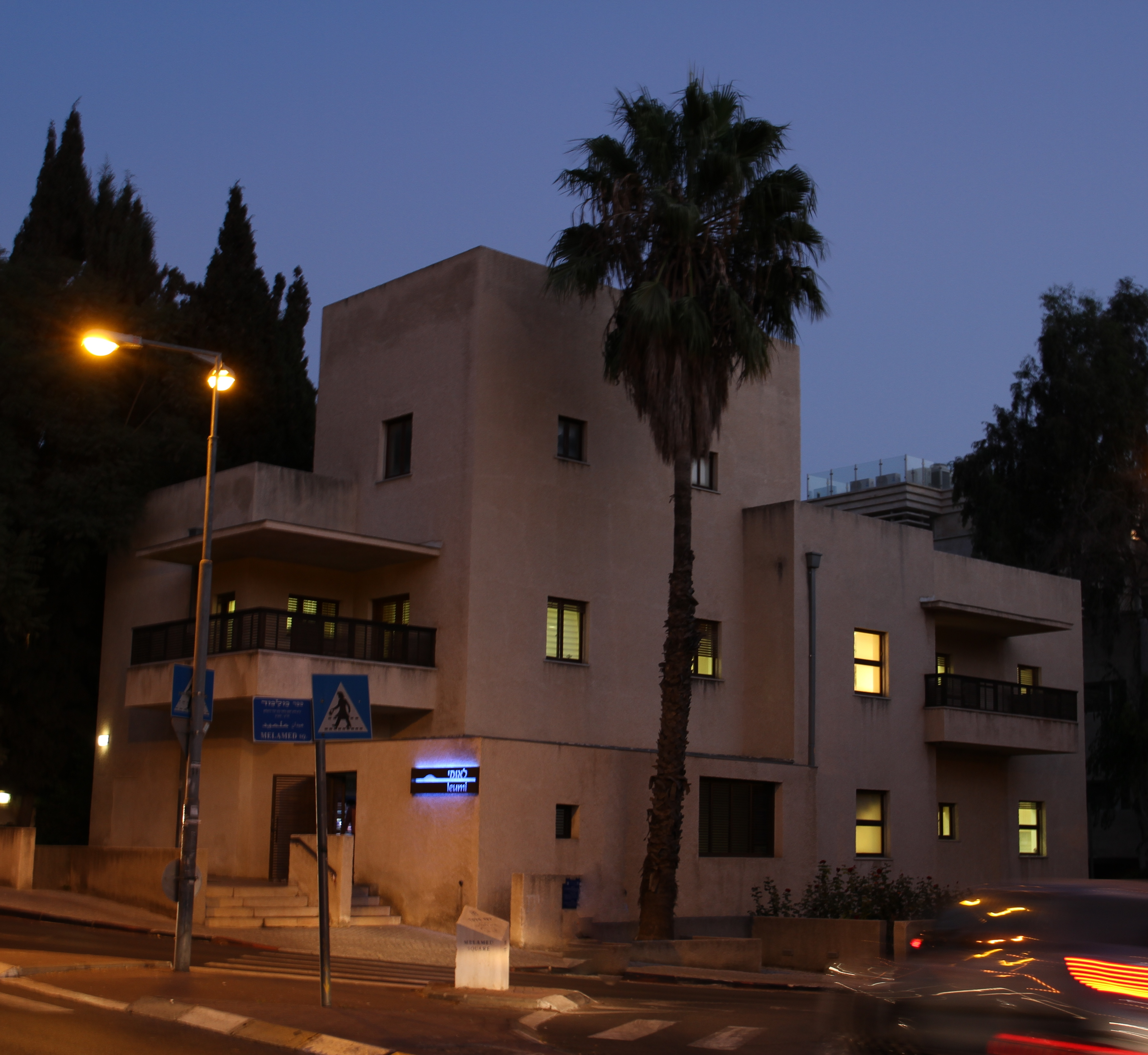
a heritage building in Rehavia

Most of Rehavia's streets are named after Jewish scholars and poets from the Golden Age of Jewish culture in Spain. Among them are Maimonides (Ben Maimon), Nachmanides (Ramban), Don Isaac Abarbanel, Abraham ibn Ezra, Hasdai ibn Shaprut, Isaac Alfasi, Rabbi David Kimhi (the Radak), Yehuda Alharizi, Shlomo ibn Aderet (the Rashba), Benjamin of Tudela, and Dunash ben Labrat. There are few exceptions, most notably Keren Kayemet Le'Israel (Jewish National Fund) Street and Ussishkin Street. In 1926, a street was named Keren Kayemet Le'Israel to honor the 25th year of the Jewish National Fund. In 1934, the Rehavia neighborhood council decided to change the name of this street to Rechov Ussishkin, and move Keren Kayemet Le'Israel Street to its present location.

== Notable residents ==
- Menachem Ben-Sasson, former President of the Hebrew University of Jerusalem and member of Knesset
- Avraham Burg
- Eliezer Igra
- Emanuel Feldman
- David Flusser
- Haile Selassie, Emperor of Ethiopia
- Moshe Goshen-Gottstein
- Moshe Greenberg
- Erich Mendelsohn
- Benjamin Netanyahu (born 1949), Prime Minister
- Menachem Ussishkin (1863–1941), Zionist leader and head of the Jewish National Fund
- Berel Wein, rabbi
- Daphni Leef, activist
- Reuven Rivlin, President of Israel
- Miriam Naor, President of the Supreme Court of Israel
- David Kroyanker
