= Nitsana Darshan-Leitner =

Israeli activist and lawyer

- ניצנה דרשן-לייטנר
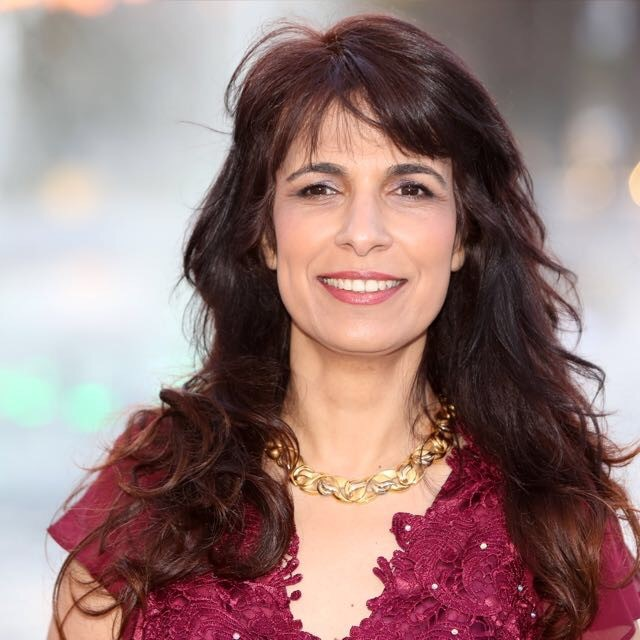
- Born: Petach Tikvah, Israel
- Education: Bar Ilan University; Manchester University
- Alma mater: Ono Academic College
- Occupations: Lawyer, Jewish rights advocate
- Website: israellawcenter.org

Nitsana Darshan-Leitner (Hebrew: ניצנה דרשן-לייטנר) is an Israeli attorney, human rights activist, and the founder of Shurat HaDin – Israeli Law Center. As the president of the Shurat HaDin, she has represented hundreds of terror victims in legal actions against terror organizations and their supporters. Darshan-Leitner initiated a legal campaign to deprive terrorists of social media resources such as Facebook and Twitter. Darshan-Leitner assisted in blocking the Gaza Freedom Flotilla.

Darshan-Leitner was chosen as one of the 50 most influential Jews in the world by The Jerusalem Post, and by Forbes Israel as one of the 50 most influential Israeli women.

== Early life, education and family ==
Darshan-Leitner was born in Petah Tikva, Israel to a Persian Jewish family. Her family immigrated to Israel from a small village outside of Shiraz, Iran, around the time the state was established. She studied Law at Bar-Ilan University and has an MBA from Manchester University (Ono Academic College). Nitsana is a mother of six including triplets.

Nitsana's husband Aviel (Craig Arthur) Leitner was part of Terror Against Terror (TNT), followers of Meir Kahane and associated with Kach. He and four others were charged in 1984 in association with shooting at a bus of Arab workers, along with a series of arsons. Leitner agreed to testify for the prosecution but then fled back home to New York. He was extradited in 1986 and served the remainder of a 30-month sentence. Aviel Leitner now also works for Shurat HaDin.

== Career ==
In the 1990s, Darshan-Leitner helped litigate a case on behalf of victims of the Achille Lauro hijacking of 1985. During work on this case, she appeared before the Israeli Supreme Court in an attempt to prevent one of the hijackers, Muhammed Abbas, from being allowed to travel to Israel.

In 2003, Darshan-Leitner founded Shurat HaDin in Tel Aviv. Shurat HaDin is an Israeli-based civil rights center which focuses on bringing lawsuits and legal actions on behalf of the victims of terrorism. She has said she was influenced by the activities of the Southern Poverty Law Center which had bankrupted several branches of the KKK and other neo-Nazi groups through civil litigation. In founding Shurat HaDin, she noted her goal was to "go after terrorists in the same way that they (the SPLC) were going after racists".

According to a 2007 leaked US embassy cable, Darshan-Leitner explained to a US embassy official that Shurat HaDin received evidence from and acted on information from Mossad, Israel's national intelligence agency.

In 2012, Nitsana Darshan-Leitner, Director of Shurat HaDin, received the Moskowitz Prize for Zionism for fighting Israel's war on terror in courtrooms.

== Prominent cases ==
Since 2003, Darshan-Leitner and a team of lawyers have worked with hundreds of terror victims in lawsuits and legal actions against Hamas, the Palestinian Authority, Iran and Syria.

Darshan-Leitner has been involved in a wide range of legal actions in Israel, and abroad, on behalf of Jewish rights cases

In 2012, Darshan-Leitner (Shurat Hadin) sent warning letters to World Vision Australia and AusAID, after the two aid organizations had been accused of funding the Palestinian Union of Agricultural Workers Committee (UAWC), which Darshan-Leitner said was an instrumentality of the terrorist Popular Front for the Liberation of Palestine (PFLP). UAWC - World Vision activities were resumed in early March 2012, after an investigation by World Vision found no evidence that humanitarian support for UAWC was in any way leaking to terrorists. Darshan-Leitner rejected the finding and demanded, under Australia's Freedom of Information Act that AUS Aid and World Vision turn over details of the investigation. She noted that USAID, the agency that administers foreign aid for the U.S. government, has labeled UAWC a PFLP affiliate, an allegation based on a 1993 report.

In May 2008, Shurat HaDin was co-counsel in filing in Manhattan Federal Court against Swiss mega bank UBS GA which is accused by the plaintiffs of financing terror.

In July 2008, the Center joined with Montreal-based attorney Jeffrey Boro and Professor Ed Morgan of the University of Toronto's International Law and Counter-Terrorism Project to file a civil action by Canadian victims of Hizbollah. The lawsuit. contends that since 2004, the Lebanese-Canadian Bank (LCB), formerly the Lebanese branch of the Royal Bank of Canada, permitted the Yousser Company for Finance and Investment and the Martyrs Foundation, two Lebanese organizations recognized by the United States as active terrorist groups, to open and maintain accounts at the bank.

On July 14, 2008, Darshan-Leiter and Attorney Robert Tolchin of New York filed a civil action on behalf of victims of the Hizbollah against an American Bank. The action was filed in the New York State Supreme Court in Manhattan Representing 85 victims and their family members, the lawsuit alleges that the American Express (AMEX) Bank, Ltd. and the Lebanese-Canadian Bank (LCB) unlawfully executed millions of dollars in wire transfers for Hizbollah between 2004 and 2006.

In February 2011, Darshan-Leitner and David Schoen filed a $5m lawsuit against former US President Jimmy Carter, alleging that his book, Palestine: Peace not Apartheid, "intentionally misleads and misrepresents about actual historic events", contrary to New York state law against deceptive business practices. In May 2011, three months after the filing, the suit was dropped by the plaintiffs.

Israel Law Center Writ Seeking Seizure from ICANN for Iran's web domains

In June 2014, Darshan-Leitner filed a writ in the United States District Court in Washington, D. C., seeking seizure of the web domains belonging to the Islamic Republic of Iran to compensate victims of Iranian sponsored terrorism. The awarding of this seizure and the assets to the plaintiffs of a 2003 lawsuit where they won a monetary award, but have been unable to collect. This suit, filed against Internet Corporation for Assigned Names and Numbers (ICANN), seeks the seizure based on ICANN's position as a United States registered non-profit organization. The debate on whether ICANN should be under the jurisdiction of the U.S. has been going on for some time, and has not been resolved.

In September 2014, Shurat HaDin filed a war crimes complaint against Khaled Mashal, the top leader of Hamas at the International Criminal Court for executing Palestinians without trial during the Summer 2014 Gaza war.

Sokolow et al v. Palestine Liberation Organization et al - Darshan-Leitner was co-counsel in the civil proceedings against the PLO and the Palestinian Authority, which found both organizations liable for the injuries and deaths of American citizens caused by six terror attacks in Israel between 2001 and 2004. Damages totaling $655.5 million were awarded by the jury. However, on 31 August 2016, the Second US Circuit Court of Appeals in Manhattan dismissed the lawsuit on the grounds that US federal courts lacked overseas jurisdiction on civil cases. The suit was ultimately sent back to the trial court for dismissal.

In September 2020, and after pressure from Israeli and Jewish lobby groups including Shurat HaDin, the US-based firm Zoom Video Communications, developer of the video teleconferencing app Zoom canceled a webinar that was to be held at San Francisco State University featuring Leila Khaled, a member of the Popular Front for the Liberation of Palestine who took part in two plane hijackings in 1969 and 1970.

In September 2021, The Jerusalem District Court ruled Hamas must pay NIS 38 million ($11.8 million) to the families of Naftali Fraenkel, Eyal Yifrach, and Gilad Shaar, three teenagers kidnapped and murdered in the West Bank in 2014. The families were represented in the trial by Shurat HaDin.

== Public campaigns ==
On May 1, 2008, Darshan-Leitner along with former Soviet Ida Nudel launched a public campaign to save the life of a Palestinian police officer accused of having assisted the Israeli intelligence services in hunting down fugitive terrorists. The policeman, Imad Sa'ad has been sentenced to death by a Palestinian military tribunal in Hebron. Sa'ad, it is alleged, provided the Israel Defense Forces with the whereabouts of four suspected bomb makers whom the Palestinian Authority was unwilling to hand over to the Israelis.

Darshan-Leitner has argued that the Temple Mount is being harmed by work carried out by the Jerusalem Wakf and she organized a campaign to encourage the Israeli government to file charges against the Wakf. "The Temple Mount", one of the holiest sites in the Muslim world and home of the Al-Aqsa mosque, "is the property of Jewish nation and has been for thousands of years", claimed Darshan-Leitner. Darshan-Leitner took the case to court and lost. The High Court (BAGATZ), dismissed the claim.

In December 2020, she presented the book Harpoon: Inside the Covert War Against Terrorism's Money Masters she co-wrote with Samuel M. Katz, detailing the legal fights against terror organizations.

== Works ==
- Harpoon: Inside the Covert War Against Terrorism's Money Masters. Hachette, 2020. ISBN 9780316399012
