= Anti-Terrorism Act =

The Anti-Terrorism Act is the short title of several pieces of anti-terrorism legislation and may refer to:

- The Anti-Terrorism Act 2005 (Australia)
- The Anti-terrorism Act, 2009 (Bangladesh)
- In Canada:
  - The Anti-Terrorism Act, 2001
  - The Anti-terrorism Act, 2015
- The Anti-Terrorism Act 1997 (Pakistan)
- The Anti-Terrorism Act of 2020 (Philippines)
- In the United States
  - The Antiterrorism Act of 1992 (federal)
  - The Antiterrorism and Effective Death Penalty Act of 1996 (federal)
  - The Anti-Terrorism Act of 2001 (New York state)
