= Shurat HaDin =

Israeli legal advocacy group

Shurat HaDin Israel Law Center
- שורת הדין
- Formation: 2003
- Founder: Nitsana Darshan-Leitner
- Founded at: Tel Aviv, Israel
- Type: Non-profit organization
- President: Nitsana Darshan-Leitner
- Website: israellawcenter.org

Shurat HaDin (Hebrew: שורת הדין), also Israel Law Center (ILC), is an Israeli non-governmental organization (NGO) founded in Tel Aviv in 2003. Shurat HaDin has been described as a civil rights organization. It has also been accused of conducting pro-Israel lawfare.

== History ==
When Shurat Hadin was founded in 2003, its stated purpose was to "combat terrorism and promote civil rights through research, education and litigation."

According to its founder and president, Nitsana Darshan-Leitner, its creation was inspired by the Southern Poverty Law Center in the United States, which used civil litigation to cripple and bankrupt the Ku Klux Klan and neo-Nazi groups in the US.

== Organization and funding ==
By 2012, Shurat HaDin had eleven employees. It retains two public relations firms, one in Israel and one in New York.

As of 2015, the annual budget was $2.5 million, though Shurat HaDin does not disclose its donors. According to an In These Times review in 2019, donations to the organizations include $1.1 million from U.S. foundations and charities over the last decade. Prominent donors are the John Hagee Ministries, run by Christian Zionist John Hagee, which has donated at least $225,000; the Jewish Federation of Greater Houston, which has given $475,000; and the Michael and Andrea Leven Family Foundation, which has given $25,000.

== Israeli government ties ==
Shurat HaDin works closely with the Israeli government and the Israeli intelligence community.

According to a leaked U.S. diplomatic cable, Darshan-Leitner told U.S. officials in 2007 that "in its early years" Shurat HaDin "took direction from the GOI [Government of Israel] on which cases to pursue" and that it received evidence from Israeli government officials. The cable quoted Darshan-Leitner directly: "The [Israeli] National Security Council (NSC) legal office saw the use of civil courts as a way to do things that they are not authorized to do." She later denied ever saying that to a U.S. diplomat.

In an interview in 2014, Darshan-Leitner told a Swedish pro-Israel nonprofit that "governments cannot do what we do", citing "political restraints" and "international treaties".

In a 2017 book entitled Harpoon after Mossad's finance-tracking unit, Darshan-Leitner described her cooperation with the intelligence agency. She wrote that Mossad operatives held regular briefings with her and would tip her off on suspect financing for her to file lawsuits against. In some cases, the Israeli government provided written affidavits to back up claims. She claimed that her role in the operation was voluntary and unpaid. Two of the cases she credited the cooperation for was the lawsuit against the Palestinian Authority in 2015 and the legal complaints that led to the disbanding of a planned 2011 Gaza flotilla. Israel's military censors had to redact a fifth of the text according to Darshan-Leitner.

Critics have labeled Shurat HaDin a "government-organized non-governmental organization" over its ties to the Israeli government.

== Lawsuits, legal complaints, and threats ==
Shurat HaDin has filed a large number of lawsuits and legal complaints.

=== The twelve missing Iranian Jews (2006) ===
In 1994, twelve Iranian Jews disappeared as they, aided by Mossad and the Jewish Agency, attempted to escape the country to Israel. In 2006 Shurat HaDin sued former Iranian President Mohammad Khatami on behalf of their families as they thought they had been wrongfully imprisoned when he was president. However, in 2014 it was found that the majority of the Jews had been killed by Iranian security forces who believed them to be members of the dissident group People's Mujahedin of Iran. The others had been killed by members of their local tribe for unspecified reasons.

=== American Express Bank and Lebanese-Canadian Bank (2008) ===
In 2008, Shurat HaDin and Attorney Robert Tolchin of New York filed suit against American Express Bank (Amex) in the New York State Supreme Court in Manhattan accusing the bank of facilitating transfer of money to Hezbollah.

Representing some 85 victims and their family members, the Shurat HaDin lawsuit alleged that the Amex and the Lebanese Canadian Bank (LCB) illegally transferred millions of dollars in wire transfers to Hezbollah between 2004 and 2006.

=== UBS bank (2008) ===
In May 2008, Shurat HaDin was co-counsel in filing in the United States District Court for the Southern District of New York against the Swiss bank UBS which was accused of financing terror.

The group alleges that UBS was involved in transferring dollars to regimes such as Iran, Cuba, and North Korea. The UBS operation was uncovered by American soldiers in Iraq in 2003 who discovered brand new dollars, still wrapped in Federal Reserve casings behind a wall in Saddam Hussein's palace. A Federal Reserve investigation of the currency determined that UBS was responsible for illegally transferring between $4 and $5 billion to states designated by the U.S. as sponsors of terrorism between 1996 and 2004. At first UBS sought to deny the extent of the money transfers it had provided to Iran and others, but eventually was compelled to admit the scope of its criminal activities. UBS, one of world's wealthiest banks, was fined $100 million by the Federal Reserve for its conduct.

=== North Korea abduction case (2009) ===
In 2000 Kim Dong-shik, a South Korean pastor, was abducted in northeastern China and has not been heard from since. In 2009 Shurat HaDin, to help Kim's son and brother, both U.S. citizens, brought a lawsuit against North Korea in a U.S. federal court, seeking damages for Kim's torture and murder because the country was suspected to be behind the abduction. In 2015 the court ordered North Korea to pay $300 million in punitive damages and $15 million each to Kim's brother and his son. According to Darshan-Leitner, this was the first time a US court has found that a foreign regime which abducts an individual who is then never heard from again, has the burden of proving that he has not been murdered.

=== Jimmy Carter (2011) ===
In 2011 Shurat HaDin, representing five plaintiffs, sued former President Jimmy Carter and publisher Simon & Schuster over the publication of Carter's book Palestine: Peace Not Apartheid. It claimed that Carter and his publisher engaged in "deceptive acts in the course of conducting business" and Darshan-Leitner claimed that Carter's "hatred of Israel has led him to commit this fraud on the public." Shurat HaDin sought $5 million in damages.

Simon & Schuster said the suit was frivolous, without merit, and a "chilling attack on free speech." Jonathan Turley of George Washington University Law School said it was "clearly frivolous" and that the complaint was "written like a press release without a thin pretense of legal claims." Kevin Jon Heller of Australian National University argued that it was an attempt to bully Israel's critics:

I would hope that both the left and the right could agree that using consumer-protection laws to sue authors and publishers who publish books with controversial theses is a very bad idea. Indeed, in a world full of Glenn Becks and Pat Buchanans, it is revealing that this is the first lawsuit of its kind (a point of pride, scarily enough, for the plaintiffs' lawyers). But, of course, this is a book about Israel — and this lawsuit is simply a new front in the never-ending war against anyone who has the temerity to criticize Israel's treatment of the Palestinians. The goal of the lawsuit isn't to force Simon & Schuster to pay damages for publishing Carter's book; its goal is to bully Carter and other would-be critics of Israel into not writing books like Palestine: Peace Not Apartheid in the first place.

The plaintiffs dropped the suit after a few months.

=== Iran and Syria lawsuit (2012) ===
In 2006 Daniel Wultz, a 16-year-old American, was killed in a suicide attack in a Tel Aviv restaurant. Islamic Jihad, based in Damascus, Syria, took responsibility. Shurat HaDin brought a lawsuit on behalf of the family against Syria and Iran which it argued were responsible. In 2012 the court sided with the plaintiff and awarded the family a $323 million judgement.

=== World Vision Australia (2012) ===
In 2012 Shurat HaDin sent a letter to the Christian relief, development, and advocacy group World Vision Australia (WV) and the Australian government's international aid agency AusAID, asserting that the groups' funding of the Union of Agricultural Work Committees (UAWC), a Gaza-based Palestinian nonprofit group, could make WV and AusAID "personally, criminally and civilly liable under Australian and US law." Shurat HaDin alleged that UAWC was a front group for the Popular Front for the Liberation of Palestine (PFLP), a proscribed terrorist organization, and asserted that by providing aid to the UAWC, WV and AusAID were "aiding and abetting Palestinian terrorism, and thereby violating Australian and United States anti-terrorism laws." WV suspended its work with UAWC pending an outcome of the investigation, and resumed working with UAWC after AusAID and WV determined that the allegations were unfounded.

An investigation conducted by AusAID in conjunction with the Australian Federal Police and the Australian Security Intelligence Organisation, found no evidence to substantiate Shurat HaDin's claims of a link between UAWC and PFLP. In an October 2012 letter to Shurat ha-Din, World Vision Australia CEO Tim Costello said that the allegations made by Shurat HaDin were "unsubstantiated, and in some circumstances, defamatory".

=== Shurat HaDin v. Lynch (2013) ===
In 2012 Dan Avnon, a political theorist at the Hebrew University of Jerusalem, applied for fellowship at Sydney University and asked Jake Lynch at Sydney to endorse his application. Lynch refused, citing his leadership with the Centre for Peace and Conflict Studies, his support for the BDS movement, the fact that the Hebrew University has a campus in the West Bank and ties to the Israeli military. In 2013 Shurat HaDin sued Lynch for violating Australia's anti-racism laws and attempted to use the suit to outlaw BDS in Australia. The Executive Council of Australian Jewry publicly denounced the suit as an inappropriate use of the courts.

In April 2014 the court struck part of the suit, and Shurat HaDin lawyers narrowed the complaint to the specifics of Avnon and Lynch. But Avnon made known that he did not support the suit. In July 2014, noting that Shurat HaDin did not represent a willing client and did not have a complaint of its own, the court dismissed the case and awarded attorney fees to Lynch. Shurat HaDin said that "the case was thrown out on a technicality, not on the merits of the arguments ... [Lynch's] lawyers came up with a trick to avoid the issue being heard on its merits." Shurat HaDin's spokesperson said the suit was a warning to other Australian academic institutions.

=== Presbyterian Church USA (2014) ===
In June 2014 the General Assembly of the Presbyterian Church (USA) passed a resolution calling for divestment from U.S. companies with business interests in Israel. Altogether approximately $21 million worth of shares was divested from Hewlett Packard, Caterpillar and Motorola Solutions. Consequently, Shurat HaDin filed a complaint with the IRS arguing that PCUSA's tax-exempt status should be revoked. Shurat HaDin also claimed that it had evidence of PCUSA delegates meeting with Hezbollah and distributing antisemitic and anti-Israel materials.

=== Coca-cola threat (2015) ===
In 2015 Shurat HaDin called on Coca-Cola to drop its Palestinian franchise because its head, Zahi Khouri, was endorsing the BDS movement. It advised Coca-Cola not to associate with any entity advocating for boycotts of Israel. Shurat HaDin warned that legal action could be taken to "ensure that The Coca-Cola Company is not engaged in instituting, promoting or inciting boycotts."

=== United Electrical, Radio and Machine Workers of America (2015) ===
In August 2015 United Electrical, Radio and Machine Workers of America became the first national trade union in the U.S. to endorse the BDS movement. Consequently, Shurat HaDin and David Abrams of the Zionist Advocacy Center filed an unfair labor practices against the union. Shurat HaDin argued that it violated "American labor law for the union to encourage its members to cease doing business with Israelis and Israeli companies." The National Labor Relations Board dismissed the complaint.

=== Sokolow v. Palestine Liberation Organization (2015) ===
In 2015, Shurat HaDin represented plaintiffs who were victims of political violence in Israel committed by Hamas and the al-Aqsa Martyrs Brigade. Shurat HaDin sued the Palestine Liberation Organization (PLO) and Palestinian Authority (PA) in the U.S. District Court for the Southern District of New York under the U.S. Anti-Terrorism Act, arguing that the PLO and PA had facilitated the attacks by providing financial aid and logistical support to the attackers, and by providing stipends to the families of suicide bombers. The jury awarded the plaintiffs $218.5 million, which was automatically trebled under the Anti-Terrorism Act to $655.5 million. In 2016, the U.S. Court of Appeals for the Second Circuit overturned the verdict, finding that PLO and PA lacked a sufficient connection to the United States for the federal courts to exercise jurisdiction over them in a civil case, in accordance with the limits set by the Constitution's Due Process Clause. However, in 2025 the Supreme Court ruled that the PLO and PA are subject to jurisdiction in Fuld v. PLO. On 30 March 2026, the United States Court of Appeals for the 2nd Circuit reinstated the $655.5 million judgment against the PLO. The Supreme Court later declined to halt enforcement of the judgment.

=== Facebook lawsuit (2015) ===
In December 2015, Shurat HaDin posted two racist Facebook pages, one anti-Israel and the other anti-Palestinian Arab in an effort to establish bias at Facebook; Facebook at first removed only the anti-Arab hate page, while maintaining that the anti-Israel page "met community standards", but later conceded that the pages were alike and also removed the anti-Israel hate page.

The same year a class-action lawsuit, Lakin v. Facebook Inc., was filed on behalf of 20,000 Israelis in the State of New York in October 2015; the plaintiffs alleged that Facebook had ignored incitement to violence by Palestinian users. The suit was dismissed under Section 230 of the Communications Decency Act. Nitsana Darshan-Leitner argued that by allowing Hamas, Hezbollah, PLO, and ISIS to use Facebook the social media giant is providing "material support" to those groups.

=== Lorde concert cancellation (2018) ===
In January 2018, Shurat HaDin filed a lawsuit demanding NIS 15,000 to each of three teenagers (about $13,000), Shoshana Steinbach, Ayelet Wertzel and Ahuva Frogel, against the New Zealand Palestinian solidarity activists Justine Sachs and Nadia Abu-Shanab for allegedly convincing the New Zealand singer Lorde to cancel her scheduled tour of Tel Aviv in mid-2018. The lawsuit alleged that the cancellation had damaged the teenagers "artistic welfare" and that they had suffered "emotional" injury and "above all damage to their good name as Israelis and Jews." The lawsuit was filed under the Israeli Law for Prevention of Damage to State of Israel through Boycott. Sachs and Abu-Shanab had earlier penned an open letter on the New Zealand online current affairs magazine The Spinoff in December 2017 urging Lorde to cancel her Israel concert, citing human rights abuses against the Palestinians. The letter read:

Dear Lorde ... we're two young women based in Aotearoa, one Jewish, one Palestinian, ...

Today, millions of people stand opposed to the Israeli government's policies of oppression, ethnic cleansing, human rights violations, occupation and apartheid. As part of this struggle, we believe that an economic, intellectual and artistic boycott is an effective way of speaking out against these crimes. This worked very effectively against apartheid in South Africa, and we hope it can work again.

We can play an important role in challenging injustice today. We urge you to act in the spirit of progressive New Zealanders who came before you and continue their legacy.

In October 2018, the Jerusalem Magistrate's Court ruled in favor of the plaintiffs and ordered that the two New Zealand activists pay NIS 45,000 in damages to the plaintiffs, plus NIS 11,000 in legal fees (about $23,600). This is believed to be the first successful application of the 2011 law.

The two activists stated that they had "no intention" of paying the teenagers, and launched a crowdfunding campaign in order to give the money to the Gaza Mental Health Foundation, and raised more than $18,000 in three days. Darshan-Leitner said that legal agreements between Israel and New Zealand allowed her to enforce the ruling in New Zealand, and to "go after [the activists'] bank accounts until it has been fully realized." Legal experts in New Zealand said that the lawsuit was an attempt to chill free speech and that attempts to enforce the judgement were unlikely to be successful.

=== Airbnb lawsuit (2018) ===
In November 2018 Airbnb announced that it would remove listings of properties owned by settlers in the Israeli-occupied West Bank. Israel's Strategic Affairs Minister Gilad Erdan called on affected settlers to sue Airbnb. Shurat HaDin consequently sued Airbnb on behalf of a group of Israeli-American Jews owning properties in the West Bank. In April 2019 Airbnb reversed its decision and would continue to allow listings from illegal Israeli settlements.

== Criticism ==
In two interviews on The Real News Network, Michael Ratner, president emeritus of the Center for Constitutional Rights and president of the European Center for Constitutional and Human Rights, argued that Shurat HaDin was a Zionist propaganda arm for Israel, dedicated to filing multiple suits without necessarily expecting to win them. Australian academic Stuart Rees has accused Shurat HaDin of acting as a legal attack dog for the Israeli government.

Blogger Richard Silverstein states that Shurat Hadin files frivolous lawsuits designed to tie up resources and garner headlines, rather than to win a legal case or establish a precedent. The idea, he argues, is to force companies or institutions that Shurat Hadin thinks are acting in ways hostile to Israel's interests to spend enormous sums defending their position. Liz Jackson, staff attorney at Palestine Legal, argues along the same lines. In her view, Shurat HaDin files lawsuits it knows it will lose because the publicity allows it to smear human rights activists as terrorists. It is a "win-win strategy", she argues, because the organization is funded well enough that it can afford to lose.
