= Sokolow v. Palestine Liberation Organization =

Sokolow v. Palestine Liberation Organization was a civil action brought in US federal courts against the Palestine Liberation Organization (PLO) and the Palestinian Authority. The plaintiffs were US citizens injured in terrorist attacks in Israel and relatives of US citizens who were killed in the attacks. They sued under the Anti-Terrorism Act, seeking $1 billion or more in damages. On 31 August 2016, the United States Court of Appeals for the Second Circuit vacated the judgment and ordered the case dismissed, holding that the federal courts lacked personal jurisdiction over the PLO and PA, and the 2nd Circuit decision was effectively upheld on appeal when the Supreme Court of the United States refused to hear an appeal of the Sokolow decision, sending the case back to the trial court for dismissal. However, in 2025 the Supreme Court ruled that the PLO and PA are subject to jurisdiction in Fuld v. PLO. On 30 March 2026, the United States Court of Appeals for the 2nd Circuit reinstated the $655.5 million judgment against the PLO. The Supreme Court later declined to halt enforcement of the judgment.

== Background ==
The plaintiffs filed the action in 2004 in the United States District Court for the Southern District of New York, alleging violations of the Anti-Terrorism Act (ATA) arising from seven attacks in Israel during the Second Intifada. The plaintiffs were U.S. citizens who had been injured in the attacks, along with family members, guardians and representatives of the estates of U.S. citizens who had been killed.

=== Attacks ===
Six of the attacks ultimately formed the basis of the jury's verdict: a January 22, 2002 shooting on Jaffa Road in Jerusalem; the January 27, 2002 Jaffa Street bombing; the March 21, 2002 King George Street bombing in Jerusalem; the June 19, 2002 2002 French Hill suicide bombing; the July 31, 2002 Hebrew University bombing; and the January 29, 2004 Bus No. 19 bombing. Claims arising from a January 8, 2001 shooting in which plaintiff Oz Joseph Guetta was wounded were not submitted to the jury after the district court found the evidence supporting those claims too speculative.

=== Plaintiffs ===
The case involved plaintiffs from 11 families. Four families—the Carter, Coulter, Blutstein, and Gritz families—brought claims arising from the deaths of Dina Carter, Janis Ruth Coulter, Benjamin Blutstein, and David Gritz, respectively, in the Hebrew University bombing. Karen Goldberg and her seven children brought claims arising from the death of her husband, Yechezkel Isser Goldberg, in the Bus No. 19 bombing.

Mark and Rena Sokolow and their daughters Lauren and Jamie, described as the lead plaintiffs, were injured in the January 27, 2002 bombing on Jaffa Road. The Gould and Waldman families brought claims arising from the January 22, 2002 shooting on Jaffa Road; Shayna Gould (later Shayna Gould Elliott) was seriously injured in the attack, as was Shmuel Waldman.

The Mandelkorn family's claims arose from injuries suffered by Shaul Mandelkorn in the June 2002 French Hill bombing, while the Bauer family's claims arose from injuries to Alan Bauer and his seven-year-old son in the March 2002 King George Street bombing. Oz Joseph Guetta and Varda Guetta were plaintiffs in claims arising from the January 8, 2001 shooting on the Jerusalem–Givat Ze'ev road; those claims were not submitted to the jury.

== District court proceedings ==
=== Pretrial proceedings ===
The PLO and PA repeatedly challenged the district court's personal jurisdiction over them. In March 2011, Judge George B. Daniels denied a motion to dismiss, concluding that the defendants' activities in the United States were sufficient for the court to exercise personal jurisdiction. After the Supreme Court narrowed the standard for general jurisdiction in Daimler AG v. Bauman in 2014, the defendants sought reconsideration and later moved for summary judgment on jurisdictional grounds. Daniels rejected those arguments, ruling in December 2014 that the case could proceed.

The defendants then sought review of the jurisdictional ruling from the Second Circuit, which denied their petition in January 2015.

=== Trial and verdict ===
The trial began in January 2015 before Judge George B. Daniels and lasted seven weeks. The plaintiffs argued that the PLO and PA had provided material support for the six attacks submitted to the jury, while the defendants denied that the organizations had authorized or supported the attacks.

On February 23, 2015, the jury found the PLO and PA liable for all six attacks and awarded the plaintiffs $218.5 million in damages. Under the Anti-Terrorism Act, the damages were automatically trebled to $655.5 million.

== Appeal and further proceedings ==
On 31 August 2016, the United States Court of Appeals for the Second Circuit vacated the district court's judgment, holding that the federal courts lacked personal jurisdiction over the PLO and PA. The court concluded that the defendants were not subject to general jurisdiction in the United States and that the plaintiffs' claims lacked a sufficient connection to the United States to support specific jurisdiction. The court remanded the case with instructions to dismiss it without prejudice.

The plaintiffs petitioned the Supreme Court of the United States for review, but the Court denied certiorari on 2 April 2018.

=== Renewed litigation ===
In 2019, Congress enacted the Promoting Security and Justice for Victims of Terrorism Act of 2019 (PSJVTA), which allowed U.S. courts to hear certain civil terrorism cases against the PLO and PA. In 2020, the Supreme Court sent the case back to the lower courts for reconsideration under the new law.

In 2022, the district court found that the PSJVTA applied to the PLO and PA but held its jurisdictional provision unconstitutional. The Second Circuit affirmed that ruling in 2023.

=== 2025 Supreme Court decision ===
On 20 June 2025, the Supreme Court of the United States reversed the Second Circuit's judgments in Fuld v. Palestine Liberation Organization and the related Waldman proceedings. The Court held that the personal-jurisdiction provision of the PSJVTA did not violate the Due Process Clause of the Fifth Amendment. It rejected the Second Circuit's conclusion that the Fifth Amendment imposed the same jurisdictional limits on federal courts as the Fourteenth Amendment imposes on state courts.

The Supreme Court remanded the cases for further proceedings consistent with its decision.

=== Reinstatement of judgment ===
On 30 March 2026, the Second Circuit granted the plaintiffs' motion to recall its November 28, 2016 mandate and affirmed the district court's October 1, 2015 judgment, reinstating the $655.5 million award against the PLO and PA. The Supreme Court later declined to halt enforcement of the judgment.

== The Sokolow Decision in scholarship ==
Michael Ratner has written that the US Court's ruling against the Palestinian Authority failed to treat Palestine as a state, immune, like Israel, from suits of this kind. He says that there is no jurisdiction over Palestine, that links between the murderers as the PNA unproven, that a fair jury was impossible to obtain in the U.S. and that the trial should not have taken place. It was, he added, both an obstacle to Palestinian victims seeking redress from Israel and a measure that held Palestinians to be collectively responsible for the acts of a few.

== See also ==
- 2004 Jerusalem bus 19 bombing
- Shurat HaDin
