= 2002 Jaffa Street shooting =

2002 shooting attack in Jerusalem

- Part of the Second Intifada
- Location: Jaffa Road, Jerusalem
- Date: January 22, 2002
- Attack type: Shooting
- Weapon: M16 rifle
- Deaths: 2 civilians and the attacker
- Injuries: More than 40
- Perpetrator: Al-Aqsa Martyrs' Brigades (claimed responsibility)
- Assailant: Said Ramadan
- Litigation: Sokolow v. Palestine Liberation Organization

The 2002 Jaffa Street shooting was an attack on Jaffa Road in central Jerusalem on January 22, 2002, during the Second Intifada. A Palestinian gunman fired at pedestrians and people waiting for buses, killing two women and injuring more than 40 people. The Al-Aqsa Martyrs' Brigades, a militia affiliated with Fatah, claimed responsibility.

The shooting was one of six attacks at issue in the U.S. civil case Sokolow v. Palestine Liberation Organization.

== Attack ==
The shooting occurred hours after Israeli forces killed four Hamas militants during a raid in Nablus.

Said Ramadan emerged from a covered passageway on Jaffa Road. At about 4:15 p.m., he opened fire with an M16 rifle at pedestrians and people waiting for buses at the junction of Jaffa Road and Rav Kook Street during the afternoon rush hour. Police pursued Ramadan into a parking lot and shot him dead.

Magen David Adom completed its evacuation of casualties from the scene 21 minutes after receiving the emergency call.

== Casualties ==
Svetlana Sandler, 56, and Sarah Hamburger, 79, died from their injuries. Sandler was an engineer who had immigrated from Russia in 1992. Hamburger was on her way to a lecture at Yad Sarah.

Fourteen people remained hospitalized on the afternoon of January 23, including two women in serious condition in intensive care. Another 34 people had been discharged after treatment for minor injuries or shock.

Shayna Elliott (then Shayna Gould), a 19-year-old student from Skokie, Illinois, was shot in the chest and had a lung removed. Shmuel Waldman, from Borough Park, Brooklyn, was shot twice in the leg while boarding a bus and underwent multiple operations.

Bus driver Chaim Salah suffered minor injuries and drove his bus to a hospital. Clothing-shop owner Faya Hasid, 40, suffered minor injuries; her husband said she had been caught in the crossfire between the gunman and police.

Sbarro employee Amir Zachayka fainted during the shooting and was treated for shock. Another employee, Moussa Awad, was also injured. Both were injured again in the Jaffa Street bombing five days later.

== Responsibility ==
Masked militants in Nablus announced over loudspeakers that the Al-Aqsa Martyrs' Brigades, an armed group affiliated with Fatah, had carried out the attack. They identified the gunman as Ramadan, a 24-year-old from the village of Tel. Ramadan worked for the Palestinian Authority's naval police.

An unnamed Al-Aqsa source told the Associated Press that the shooting was retaliation for the killing of the group's leader Raed Al Karmi. Al Jazeera reported a separate claim of responsibility by Hamas, issued in a leaflet.

== Reactions and aftermath ==
Israeli officials held Yasser Arafat and the Palestinian Authority responsible for the shooting. Palestinian official Saeb Erekat blamed Israeli policy. U.S. State Department spokesman Richard Boucher condemned the attack and called on Arafat to prevent further attacks and arrest those responsible.

The following day, damaged shop windows were replaced and shoppers returned, although crowds were smaller and security was heavier.

== Civil litigation ==
American survivors Elliott and Waldman, along with members of their families, sued the Palestine Liberation Organization (PLO) and Palestinian Authority (PA) in Sokolow v. Palestine Liberation Organization.

In February 2015, a jury found the PLO and PA liable for six attacks, including the Jaffa Street shooting. The resulting $655.5 million judgment under the Antiterrorism Act of 1992 included $60 million for Elliott and $22.5 million for Waldman.

The judgment was vacated on jurisdictional grounds in 2016 and reinstated in March 2026. In August 2026, U.S. Supreme Court Justice Sonia Sotomayor declined to stay its enforcement.
