= Kenneth W. Stein =

American academic

Kenneth W. Stein is a professor known for studying the Arab–Israeli conflict, in both historical and social-economic context. He spent many years working with the Carter Center from the 1980s, before cutting ties in 2006; and decades teaching at Emory University starting in 1977. His life has been filled with teaching and interdisciplinary study of the Middle East with the publication of many books on the subject of Israel, the Middle East and the foundations of the Arab–Israeli conflict.

== Early life ==
Professor Kenneth W. Stein was born in 1946 in Hempstead, New York to parents Mathilde (Tillie) Wertheim Stein, a teacher of foreign language, and Max Kaufmann Stein, an accountant. Both were Jews who emigrated to the U.S. before and after Hitler's ascension to power.

== Education ==
Professor Stein received his undergraduate BA degree from Franklin and Marshall College (1968), and two masters (1969 and 1971) and his doctoral degree (1976) from The University of Michigan. His doctoral work focused on the social-economic background of the Arab–Israeli conflict in British Mandatory Palestine. From 1971 to 1973, he was a visiting graduate student at The Hebrew University of Jerusalem. As a returning graduate student to Ann Arbor from 1973 to 1976, he wrote secondary school social studies materials on the Middle East.

== Academic career and administration ==
Since 1977, Professor Stein has taught Middle Eastern history, political science and Israel studies at Emory University, where he holds a joint appointment in the History and Political Science Departments. Author, writer, teacher, and lecturer, he was at the center of developing sustained institutions at Emory, namely the International Study Center (1979), the Middle East Research Program (1992), and the Institute for the Study of Modern Israel (1998). He was the first permanent Director of the Carter Center (1983–1986) and its Middle East Fellow from 1982 to 2006.

Stein's scholarship focuses on the origins and politics of modern Israel, Palestinian social history, the British Mandate in Palestine, the Arab-Israeli negotiating process, American foreign policy toward the region, and the modern Arab world. Primarily, he concentrates on undergraduate teaching in courses on American foreign policy toward the Middle East, the modern Arab world, Arab–Israeli conflict, and modern Israel. His undergraduate course, "History, Politics and Diplomacy of the Arab Israeli Conflict," is one of Emory's most popular courses. In Spring 2006, he was a visiting professor of political science at Brown University.

== The Carter Center ==
At the Carter Center, from November 6 to 9, 1983, Stein directed a conference on the Middle East called "Middle East Consultation: Five Years After Camp David." He was "appointed Carter Center Middle East Fellow in 1983." Appointed by Emory University, he directed the center from December 1983 through June 1986 and advised President Carter on the Middle East (page 6 of Stein's CV). Stein was a Carter Center monitor of the Palestinian Presidential and Legislative Council elections in January 1996. Stein remained Middle East Fellow of the Carter Center until the publication of Carter's book Palestine: Peace Not Apartheid, resigning in December 2006.

== Palestine Peace Not Apartheid, by Jimmy Carter ==
Stein resigned from his position as Middle East Fellow of the Carter Center in December 2006. In his subsequent public lectures and media appearances, Stein, who "made Middle East trips with Carter in 1983, 1987 and 1990, [and] was "partner" with Carter in writing an earlier Middle East volume, The Blood of Abraham, published in 1985", has criticized Carter's book for what he alleges are its multiple errors and omissions.

Stein's detailed review of the book appears in the Middle East Quarterly.

== Emory Institute for the Study of Modern Israel ==
Established by Prof. Kenneth W. Stein in 1998, the Institute for the Study of Modern Israel (ISMI) is an interdisciplinary and non-degree conferring unit of Emory University. It was the first academic institute for the study of modern Israel established in the United States. It promotes teaching, research, and learning that focuses on Israeli culture, foreign policy, history, society, and politics. ISMI likewise offers an internship program at Emory, which fosters appreciation for Israel and its people by immersing students in real world experiences. ISMI interns have the opportunity to work closely with Professor Ken Stein and the ISMI staff on a wide variety of academic and scholarly projects. Students participate in research; substantive projects relating to culture, economics, history, international relations, and politics.

== Center for Israel Education ==
Since founding the Atlanta-based non-profit, The Center for Israel Education (CIE) in 2007, Prof. Stein has engaged in writing secondary school curriculum on Israel and the Middle East. CIE's work focuses on teacher/student education and curriculum development on modern Israel and the Middle East, through conducting workshops, symposia, and long-distance learning. By the end of 2015 more than 2000 middle school and secondary school teachers had participated in workshops in which he directed and participated in actively. Published by the Center for Israel Education, he has written or co-authored seven curricula/teaching units on aspects of modern Israeli history, society and politics: "A Sephardi Jewish History" (2014); "Israel @ 65: A Family and Community Resource" (2013); "Israel and the Jewish Nation: Part One" (2012); "Israel and Hebrew Language: A Nation's Choice" (2010); "Israel's National Security and Civil Liberties: Balancing the State's Objectives" (2009); "A Call to Action: Volunteering and Israel's State-Building" (2008); and "To Israel and Back: A Journey to Our Future" (2008).

== Awards and recognition ==
In 2009, he was awarded the Cuttino Medal for Lifelong Mentorship to Emory undergraduates. In 2008, the Atlanta Jewish community honored him for his thirty years of service as a public intellectual with the Tree of Life Award. In 2001, he received the Marion V. Creekmore Award for his quarter-century commitment to the internationalization of Emory College's curriculum. In 1995, Emory awarded him the Williams Award for Excellence in Undergraduate Teaching. In 2012, he was the recipient of the Jewish National Fund's prestigious Etz Chaim Award for Service to the Atlanta community.

== Books ==
- History Politics and Diplomacy of the Arab-Israeli Conflict – a source document reader for college courses and adult education (2015)
- Mediniut Amitza [Courageous Policy] (Tel Aviv: Ministry of Defense Publishing House, 2003)
- Heroic Diplomacy: Sadat, Kissinger, Carter, Begin, and the Quest for Arab-Israeli Peace (New York: Routledge, 1999)
- Making Peace Among Arabs and Israelis: Lessons from Fifty Years of Negotiating Experience, co-authored with Samuel W. Lewis (Washington: United States Institute of Peace, 1991)
- The Land Question in Palestine, 1917–1939 (Chapel Hill: University of North Carolina Press, 1984, 1985, and 2003)

== See also ==
- Arab–Israeli conflict
- Carter Center
- Israeli–Palestinian conflict
- Palestine: Peace Not Apartheid
