= Law for Prevention of Damage to State of Israel through Boycott =

Israeli law

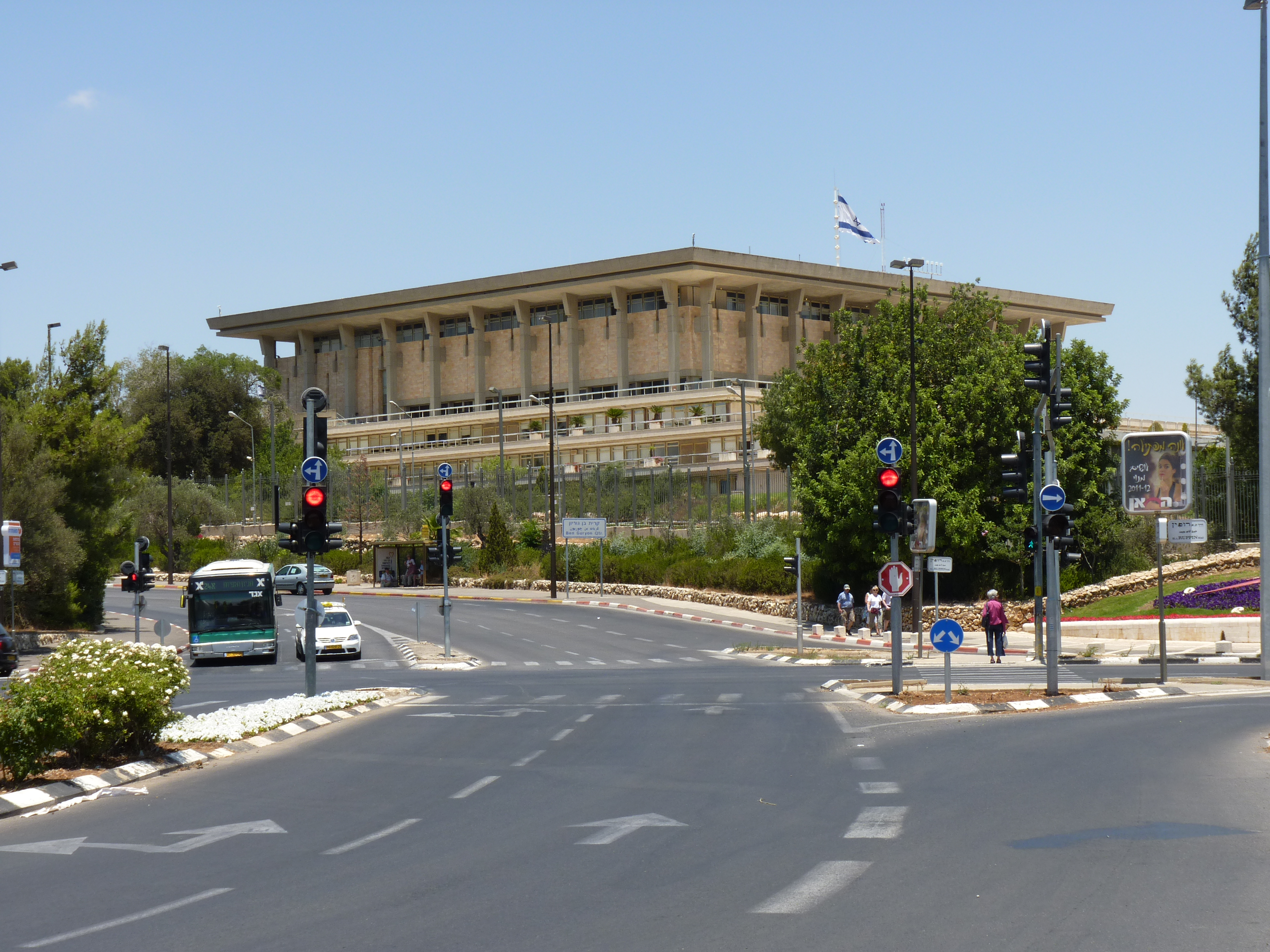

Knesset
- Enacted by: Knesset
- Enacted: 13 July 2011
- Voting summary: 47 voted for; 38 voted against
- Status: Current legislation

Law for Prevention of Damage to State of Israel through Boycott (Hebrew: חוק למניעת פגיעה במדינת ישראל באמצעות חרם, התשע"א-2011), also commonly known as the (Anti-) Boycott Law, is an Israeli anti-BDS law enacted in July 2011 and partially stricken down by the Supreme Court in 2015.

== Legislative history ==
On 5 July 2010 a private bill was introduced into the Israeli parliament, the Knesset, sponsored by Knesset members Ze'ev Elkin and Dalia Itzik and a group of members from Likud, Shas, Yisrael Beiteinu, United Torah Judaism and the National Union. The bill distinguished between three types of boycotts: A boycott imposed by a resident or citizen of Israel, a boycott imposed by a foreign resident or citizen, and a boycott imposed by a foreign political entity through a law enacted by the foreign political entity. The proposal stated that such a boycott is a civil wrong and a criminal offense punishable by a fine. After debate in a Knesset committee, the bill was changed to remove any criminality, i.e. it only provides for civil penalties, and to allow it to apply to anyone regardless of the nationality of the person who publicizes the boycott. The revised bill was published on 2 March 2011. It was approved by the Knesset on 12 July 2011 with the vote 47–38, with opposition factions voting against the bill. Prime Minister Benjamin Netanyahu and another 10 ministers, including Defence Minister Ehud Barak, were absent during the voting.

Opponents of the law argued that it violated the principle of freedom of expression. The supporters of the bill, led by Netanyahu, contended that the law doesn't and only prevents harmful actions being taken against the State of Israel or its citizens.

== The law ==
The law states that individuals or organizations who publicize a call for an economic, cultural or academic boycott against a person or entity merely because of its affiliation to the State of Israel and/or to an Israeli institute and/or to a specific region under Israeli control, may be sued civilly, in tort, by a party claiming that it might be damaged by such a boycott. The law also allows Israeli authorities to deny benefits from individuals or organizations – such as tax exemptions or participation in government contracts – if they have publicized a call to boycott and/or if they have obligated to participate in a boycott. All sections took effect on 13 July 2011, except for section 4 (withdrawing state benefits) which took effect on 11 October 2011. The law was temporarily frozen by the Supreme Court between 2012 and 2015.

In the 2015 landmark decision Avneri v. The Knesset, the Supreme Court of Israel unanimously struck down section 2c of the law (which permitted the imposition of compensation payments even if no damages were proven), ruling that it was unconstitutional. The law's other provisions were upheld by the Court in majority decisions ranging from 9–0 to 5–4.

== Reaction to the law ==
The law has been condemned as a violation of freedom of expression, "deeply undemocratic", widely criticised in the Israeli media, and "three dozen" eminent law professors have described it as unconstitutional.

After the law was enacted, a number of Israeli civil rights groups declared that they would legally challenge the law by petitioning the Supreme Court of Israel. The Association for Civil Rights in Israel claimed that the law is "unconstitutional and anti-democratic" and sets a bad precedent. Gush Shalom, Adalah, Physicians for Human Rights, the Public Committee Against Torture in Israel and the Coalition of Women for Peace – said that they would join legal challenges. On 12 July 2011, Gush Shalom was the first to lodge a petition against the law.

NGO Monitor has said that the law is not "the appropriate means to combat the BDS movement."

The Supreme Court of Israel upheld the law, but struck down provisions allowing compensation without proof of damages.

=== Application ===
The first lawsuit filed under the law was in 2018 by Shurat HaDin, an Israeli civil rights group, claiming $13,000 in "emotional damages" on behalf of three Israeli teenagers who had bought tickets for a show that was cancelled after a call to boycott. It was the first time to have been successfully applied, due to the difficulty of proving a direct link between a call to boycott and any actual damage caused by it.

In October 2018, the Jerusalem Magistrate's Court ruled in favor of the plaintiffs and ordered that the two New Zealand activists pay NIS 45,000 ($12,300) in damages to the plaintiffs' "artistic welfare", and court fees. The activists claimed the case "has no legitimacy" and refused to pay.

In 2021, the law was relied upon in a decision by the Israeli Supreme Court which upheld a 2018 prohibition enacted by the Knesset Ethics Committee on Knesset Member Yousef Jabareen; Jabareen was barred from traveling to the U.S. for a lecture tour on account of his intended tour being sponsored by Jewish Voice for Peace, a pro-BDS organization.

== See also ==
- Boycotts of Israel
- Amendment No. 28 to the Entry Into Israel Law
