= Palestine: Peace Not Apartheid =

2006 book by Jimmy Carter

- Cover showing the author, left, and protesters at the Israeli West Bank barrier, right
- Author: Jimmy Carter
- Cover artist: Michael Accordino
- Language: English
- Subject: Israeli–Palestinian conflict
- Published: 2006 (Simon & Schuster)
- Publication place: United States
- Media type: Print (hardcover and paperback), audiobook (Audio CD)
- Pages: 264
- ISBN: 0743285026
- Dewey Decimal: 956.04 22
- LC Class: DS119.7 .C3583 2006

Palestine: Peace Not Apartheid is a book written by Jimmy Carter. It was published by Simon & Schuster in November 2006. The book is primarily based on Carter's long engagement in the Israeli–Palestinian conflict, both before, during and after his presidency. He recounts his first visits to the Middle East as Governor of Georgia, his role as President in the Camp David Accords, his personal relationships with Arab and Israeli political leaders such as Anwar Sadat and Menachem Begin, his involvement in the peace process since leaving the White House, as well as his successors' policies in the region.

In the book, Carter argues that Israel's continued control and construction of settlements in the West Bank have been the primary obstacles to a comprehensive peace agreement in the Middle East. That perspective, coupled with the use of the word "apartheid" in the title, and what critics said were errors and misstatements in the book, sparked controversy. Carter defended the book and countered that response to it "in the real world… has been overwhelmingly positive."

The 2007 documentary Man from Plains depicts the tour Carter undertook to promote the book.

== Contents ==
=== Purpose ===
According to Carter:

The ultimate purpose of my book is to present facts about the Middle East that are largely unknown in America, to precipitate discussion and to help restart peace talks (now absent for six years) that can lead to permanent peace for Israel and its neighbors. Another hope is that Jews and other Americans who share this same goal might be motivated to express their views, even publicly, and perhaps in concert. I would be glad to help with that effort.

=== Thesis ===
Carter identifies "two interrelated obstacles to permanent peace in the Middle East":

[1] Some Israelis believe they have the right to confiscate and colonize Palestinian land and try to justify the sustained subjugation and persecution of increasingly hopeless and aggravated Palestinians; and
[2] Some Palestinians react by honoring suicide bombers as martyrs to be rewarded in heaven and consider the killing of Israelis as victories.

To bring an end to what he calls "this continuing tragedy", in Chapter 17 ("Summary"), Carter calls for a revitalization of the peace process based on the following three "key requirements":

a. The security of Israel must be guaranteed ...

b. The internal debate within Israel must be resolved in order to define Israel's permanent legal boundary ...

c. The sovereignty of all Middle East nations and sanctity of international borders must be honored ...

=== Apartheid analogy ===
Regarding the use of the word "Apartheid" in the title of his book, Carter has said:

It's not Israel. The book has nothing to do with what's going on inside Israel which is a wonderful democracy, you know, where everyone has guaranteed equal rights and where, under the law, Arabs and Jews who are Israelis have the same privileges about Israel. That's been most of the controversy because people assume it's about Israel. It's not.

I've never alleged that the framework of apartheid existed within Israel at all, and that what does exist in the West Bank is based on trying to take Palestinian land and not on racism. So it was a very clear distinction.

In remarks broadcast over radio, Carter claimed that Israel's policies amounted to an apartheid worse than South Africa's:

When Israel does occupy this territory deep within the West Bank, and connects the 200-or-so settlements with each other, with a road, and then prohibits the Palestinians from using that road, or in many cases even crossing the road, this perpetrates even worse instances of apartness, or apartheid, than we witnessed even in South Africa.

== Critical reaction and commentary ==
Critical response to Palestine: Peace Not Apartheid at the time of release was divided. According to Julie Bosman, criticism of the book "has escalated to a full-scale furor," much of which has focused on Carter's use of the word "apartheid" in the subtitle. Some critics, including several leaders of the Democratic Party and of American Jewish organizations, have interpreted the subtitle as an allegation of Israeli apartheid, which they believe to be inflammatory and unsubstantiated. Tony Karon, Senior Editor at TIME.com and a former anti-Apartheid activist for the ANC, said: "Jimmy Carter had to write this book precisely because Palestinian life and history is not accorded equal value in American discourse, far from it. And his use of the word apartheid is not only morally valid; it is essential, because it shakes the moral stupor that allows many liberals to rationalize away the daily, grinding horror being inflicted on Palestinians in the West Bank and Gaza". Former President Bill Clinton wrote a brief letter to the chairman of the American Jewish Committee, thanking him for articles criticizing the book and citing his agreement with Dennis Ross's attempts to "straighten ... out" Carter's claims and conclusions about Clinton's own Camp David peace proposal in the summer of 2000.

Some critics claimed that Carter crossed the line into anti-Semitism. Abraham Foxman, the national director of the Anti-Defamation League, initially accused Carter of "engaging in anti-Semitism" in the book; Foxman told James Traub later that he would not call the former president himself an "anti-Semite" or a "bigot". Ethan Bronner also asserted that Carter's "overstatement" in the book "hardly adds up to anti-Semitism."

Some journalists and academics have praised Carter for what they believe to be speaking honestly about the Israeli–Palestinian conflict in a media environment described as hostile to opponents of Israel's policies. Some left-leaning Israeli politicians such as Yossi Beilin and Shulamit Aloni argued that Carter's critique of Israeli policy in the Palestinian territories reflects that of many Israelis themselves.

=== Notable positive reactions ===
==== Journalists and other media commentators ====
In his review published on October 15, 2006, Brad Hooper, editor at Booklist, concludes: "The former president's ideas are expressed with perfect clarity; his book, of course, represents a personal point of view, but one that is certainly grounded in both knowledge and wisdom. His outlook on the problem not only contributes to the literature of debate surrounding it but also, just as importantly, delivers a worthy game plan for clearing up the dilemma." Israeli historian and author Tom Segev believes his principal argument is "well-founded".

Raja Shehadeh, a lawyer and author, including of Occupier's Law: Israel and the West Bank, regards Palestine: Peace Not Apartheid as a "fresh debate" on Israel's policies in the West Bank. Shehadeh believes that "With his well documented book and its provocative title, Carter is working to achieve 'one of the major goals of [his] life' as he makes clear at the outset of his book: 'to help ensure a lasting peace for Israelis and others in the Middle East.'"

Robert Fisk declares that the book is "a good, strong read by the only American president approaching sainthood", adding: "Needless to say, the American press and television largely ignored the appearance of this eminently sensible book—until the usual Israeli lobbyists began to scream abuse at poor old Jimmy Carter, albeit that he was the architect of the longest lasting peace treaty between Israel and an Arab neighbour—Egypt—secured with the famous 1978 Camp David accords."

Carl L. Brown in Foreign Affairs writes: "This book offers a historical overview in the form of a personal memoir, tracing developments since the 1970s as Carter experienced and understood them. He may thus be said to be both a source for the historian and himself a historian of the Israeli–Palestinian confrontation. This little book merits a reading on both counts. Carter concludes that 'Israel's continued control and colonization of Palestinian land have been the primary obstacles to a comprehensive peace agreement in the Holy Land.' That statement, so out of line with the way mainstream American political figures (even those retired from public office) frame the issue, ensures that the book will be attacked by many. Perhaps it will be read as well."

Ian Black, Middle East editor at The Guardian, writes "Controversy about the book flows largely from the word "apartheid" in the title: it is wrong if applied to Israel within its pre-1967 borders, where there is discrimination but not institutionalised racism. In the West Bank, with its confiscated land, unequal allocation of water resources, fortress-like settlements, security fence and segregated roads, it is fitting enough. No one who has seen subjugated Palestinians struggling with everyday life alongside armed Jewish settlers can quarrel with it".

In his blog, Tony Karon, a senior editor at Time and a former anti-apartheid activist for the ANC, states "The point being that Jimmy Carter had to write this book precisely because Palestinian life and history is not accorded equal value in American discourse, far from it. And his use of the word apartheid is not only morally valid; it is essential, because it shakes the moral stupor that allows many liberals to rationalize away the daily, grinding horror being inflicted on Palestinians in the West Bank and Gaza".

==== Representatives of organizations ====
In an article published on the website of the Institute for Middle East Understanding, Lena Khalaf Tuffaha finds that Carter's book "eloquently describes the situation in the West Bank and Gaza Strip" and that "his book challenges Americans to see the conflict with eyes wide open."

Writing in The Nation, Michael F. Brown, a fellow at The Palestine Center of The Jerusalem Fund, characterizes the book's title as "extraordinarily bold—and apt" and suggests: "Perhaps President Carter should send copies of his book to members of Congress. ... [so that] they might learn a thing or two about the long-festering conflict at the heart of so many of our current troubles in the region."

In The Arab American News, Sherri Muzher, Palestinian-American director of Michigan Media Watch, writes: "Nobody expects instant miracles to come from Carter's book, but hopefully, it will spark the sort of robust discussions that even Israeli society and media already engage in."

Rabbi Michael Lerner, the editor of Tikkun, calls Carter "the only president to have actually delivered for the Jewish people an agreement (the peace treaty between Israel and Egypt) that has stood the test of time." He continues: "We know that critique is often an essential part of love and caring. That is precisely what Jimmy Carter is trying to do for Israel and the Jewish people in his new book". He further stresses that "Carter does not claim that Israel is an apartheid state. What he does claim is that the West Bank will be a de facto apartheid situation if the current dynamics continue."

Canadian labour union leader Sid Ryan writes: "Former U.S. president Carter is just the latest world figure to openly challenge the policies of Israel in Gaza and the West Bank. He joins Rev. Desmond Tutu, another Nobel Prize winner. Each time a trade union or church group or world leader steps forward to break the cone of silence around this issue, the more difficult it becomes for the lobby groups to spew their propaganda."

Ali Abunimah, editor of the Electronic Intifada, writing in The Wall Street Journal, concludes "President Carter has done what few American politicians have dared to do: speak frankly about the Israel–Palestine conflict. He has done this nation, and the cause of peace, an enormous service by focusing attention on what he calls "the abominable oppression and persecution in the occupied Palestinian territories, with a rigid system of required passes and strict segregation between Palestine's citizens and Jewish settlers in the West Bank." Calling Carter "the most successful Arab-Israeli peace negotiator to date", Abunimah praises him for having "braved a storm of criticism, including the insinuation from the pro-Israel Anti-Defamation League that his arguments are anti-Semitic."

Israeli Knesset member Yossi Beilin, leader of Meretz-Yachad from 2004-2008, writes in The Forward that, while he "disagreed mostly with the choice of language, including his choice of the word 'apartheid' what Carter says in his book about the Israeli occupation and our treatment of Palestinians in the occupied territories—and perhaps no less important, how he says it—is entirely harmonious with the kind of criticism that Israelis themselves voice about their own country. There is nothing in the criticism that Carter has for Israel that has not been said by Israelis themselves."

==== Academics ====
South African professor of international law John Dugard observes that while Carter's book "is igniting controversy for its Israel and the apartheid analogy" he understands the deeper rationale for Carter's analogy as follows:

Since 1967 Israel has imposed its control over the Palestinian territories in the manner of a colonizing power, under the guise of occupation. It has permanently seized the territories' most desirable parts—the holy sites in East Jerusalem, Hebron and Bethlehem and the fertile agricultural lands along the western border and in the Jordan Valley—and settled its own Jewish "colonists" throughout the land. Israel's occupation of the Palestinian territories has many features of colonization. At the same time it has many of the worst characteristics of apartheid. ... Many aspects of Israel's occupation surpass those of the apartheid regime. Israel's large-scale destruction of Palestinian homes, leveling of agricultural lands, military incursions and targeted assassinations of Palestinians far exceed any similar practices in apartheid South Africa. No wall was ever built to separate blacks and whites.

Zbigniew Brzezinski, former National Security Adviser to President Carter, agrees with the main thesis of the book: President Carter, in my judgement, is correct in fearing that the absence of a fair and mutually acceptable resolution of the Israeli–Palestinian conflict is likely to produce a situation which de facto will resemble apartheid: i.e., two communities living side by side but repressively separated, with one enjoying prosperity and seizing the lands of the other, and the other living in poverty and deprivation. That is an outcome which must be avoided and I interpret his book as a strong plea for accommodation, which needs to be actively promoted by morally responsible engagement especially by America. Brzezinski also condemns the "abusive reactions directed at Carter, including some newspaper ads" for being "objectionable and designed to intimidate an open public discussion."

UCLA professor of English literature Saree Makdisi writes in the San Francisco Chronicle that "Carter's apartheid charge rings true", observing: "Israel maintains two sets of rules and regulations in the West Bank: one for Jews, one for non-Jews. The only thing wrong with using the word 'apartheid' to describe such a repugnant system is that the South African version of institutionalized discrimination was never as elaborate as its Israeli counterpart—nor did it have such a vocal chorus of defenders among otherwise liberal Americans."

In an essay published in The Nation, Henry Siegman, former executive director of the American Jewish Congress, and visiting professor at the School of Oriental and African Studies, University of London, begins by observing that the "book's title more than its content" caused an "uproar" even prior to publication, because it "seemed to suggest that the avatar of democracy in the Middle East may be on its way to creating a political order that resembles South Africa's apartheid model of discrimination and repression, albeit on ethnic-religious rather than racial grounds" and provoked such controversy due to "the ignorance of the American political establishment, both Democrat and Republican, on the subject of the Israel-Palestine conflict"; in Siegman's view: "Carter's harsh condemnation of Israeli policies in the occupied territories is not the consequence of ideology or of an anti-Israel bias."

Norman Finkelstein, an assistant professor of political science at DePaul University, defends Carter's analysis in Palestine: Peace Not Apartheid as both historically accurate and non-controversial outside the United States: "After four decades of Israeli occupation, the infrastructure and superstructure of apartheid have been put in place. Outside the never-never land of mainstream American Jewry and U.S. media[,] this reality is barely disputed."

George Bisharat, a professor at the University of California, Hastings College of Law, begins his "Commentary" on the book in The Philadelphia Inquirer of January 2, 2007: "Americans owe a debt to former President Jimmy Carter for speaking long hidden but vital truths. His book Palestine: Peace Not Apartheid breaks the taboo barring criticism in the United States of Israel's discriminatory treatment of Palestinians. Our government's tacit acceptance of Israel's unfair policies causes global hostility against us."

Michael Scheuer, the former head of the Central Intelligence Agency's Alec Station and professor of security studies at Georgetown University, criticized the negative response to the book, writing, "By God, even former American presidents like Carter are viciously attacked in public if they make negative comments about Israel." Scheuer pointed to Deborah Lipstadt, Jacob Olidort, and Mona Charen as examples of the "American takfiris' attack on President Carter for his book."

=== Notable negative reactions ===
==== Journalists and other media commentators ====
In "It's Not Apartheid", published in The Washington Post, columnist Michael Kinsley states that Carter "makes no attempt to explain [the use of the word 'apartheid']" which he calls "a foolish and unfair comparison, unworthy of the man who won—and deserved—the Nobel Peace Prize." He further wrote, "To start with, no one has yet thought to accuse Israel of creating a phony country in finally acquiescing to the creation of a Palestinian state. Palestine is no Bantustan. Furthermore, Israel has always had Arab citizens. No doubt many Israelis have racist attitudes toward Arabs, but the official philosophy of the government is quite the opposite, and sincere efforts are made to, for example, instill humanitarian and egalitarian attitudes in children."

National Review editor Rich Lowry says that "Carter always finds a way to point a finger at Israel." He calls Carter a "rabid partisan", saying "Yes, there are two sides to every dispute, and heaven knows the Palestinian people have suffered throughout the past six decades, but Carter apes the Palestinian position and calls it evenhandedness." Lowry feels the "book marks Carter's further disgraceful descent from ineffectual president and international do-gooder to apologist for the worst Arab tendencies", citing a passage from the book. Mona Charen writes in the National Review that "awkward phrasing is found throughout this slapdash work." Charen presents examples of what she regards as "simplistic, naïve, or tendentious" ideas in the book about the Six-Day War, Hezbollah, and Oslo Accords.

In "Jews, Arabs and Jimmy Carter", deputy foreign editor of The New York Times Ethan Bronner draws attention to what he describes as "the narrowness of Carter's perspective" and argues that Carter fails to highlight legitimate objections to Israel's current policies in the course of "simply offer[ing] a narrative that is largely unsympathetic to Israel" while engaging in some "misrepresentations ... [which] are a shame because most of what Carter focuses on is well worth reading about." To Bronner, "Carter's picture feels like yesterday's story, especially since Israel's departures from southern Lebanon and Gaza have not stopped anti-Israel violence from those areas. ... This book has something of a Rip van Winkle feel to it, as if little had changed since Carter diagnosed the problem in the 1970s." Despite his own disagreements with aspects of the book and his acknowledgment that Carter overstates his case in it, Bronner finds that others have criticized the book "unfairly": "Their biggest complaint against the book—a legitimate one—is the word "apartheid" in the title, with its false echo of the racist policies of the old South Africa. But overstatement hardly adds up to anti-Semitism."

The Economist reviewed Palestine: Peace Not Apartheid and found it to be "a weak one, simplistic and one-sided ... Israeli expansionism gets the drubbing it deserves; Arab rejectionism gets off much too lightly."

In "What Would Jimmy Do?", published in The Washington Post Book World, Jeffrey Goldberg describes Carter as a "partisan of the Palestinians" who has offered a "notably benign view of Hamas" and who, he alleges, creates "sins to hang around the necks of Jews when no sins have actually been committed" as Carter "blames Israel almost entirely for perpetuating the hundred-year war between Arab and Jew."

In "The Question of Carter's Cash", Claudia Rosett writes, "Even in Carter's long history of post-presidential grandstanding, this book sets fresh standards of irresponsibility. Purporting to give a balanced view of the Palestinian–Israeli conflict, Carter effectively shrugs off such highly germane matters as Palestinian terrorism. The hypocrisies are boundless, and include adoring praise of the deeply oppressive, religiously intolerant Saudi regime side by side with condemnations of democratic Israel."

==== Representatives of organizations ====
Prior to the book's publication, during the U.S. midterm election campaign period in the third week of October 2006, several prominent Democrats criticized both the book and the author, a fellow Democrat. Specifically, Democratic National Committee Chairman Howard Dean issued a statement: "While I have tremendous respect for former President Carter, I fundamentally disagree and do not support his analysis of Israel and the Israeli–Palestinian conflict. On this issue President Carter speaks for himself, the opinions in his book are his own, they are not the views or position of the Democratic Party. I and other Democrats will continue to stand with Israel in its battle against terrorism and for a lasting peace with its neighbors." Then-House Minority Leader Nancy Pelosi stated: With all due respect to former President Carter, he does not speak for the Democratic Party on Israel. Democrats have been steadfast in their support of Israel from its birth, in part because we recognize that to do so is in the national security interests of the United States. We stand with Israel now and we stand with Israel forever.

In an "Op-Ed" published on December 4 in The Jerusalem Post, David A. Harris, executive director of the American Jewish Committee (AJC), says that he finds it "startling that a former president who prides himself on his ongoing contribution to world peace would write a crude polemic that compromises any pretense to objectivity and fairness": "Carter leaves out what any reasonable observer, even those that share his basic views of the conflict, would consider obvious facts, but does include stunning distortions".; Harris "cite[s] just two of the numerous examples" of what he calls "such mendacity". The first of these, Harris says, is that "Carter discounts well-established claims that Israel accepted and Arafat rejected a generous offer to create a Palestinian state." The second "manifest distortion", according to Harris, is that "Carter states that Israel plans to build a security fence 'along the Jordan River, which is now planned as the eastern leg of the encirclement of the Palestinians'"; whereas well-informed observers know that "Israel has modified the projected route of the security fence on numerous occasions (the current route roughly tracks the parameters that Clinton advanced to the parties in negotiations) and that there is no plan to hem the Palestinians in on the eastern border." In omitting "these well-known developments", Harris argues, Carter is "leaving readers to think that a route that was once contemplated in proposed maps but never adopted or acted upon represents current reality."

In an unsolicited handwritten letter replying to Harris, former President Bill Clinton expresses gratitude for Harris' articles on behalf of the American Jewish Committee critiquing the book: "Dear David, Thanks so much for your articles about President Carter's book. I don't know where his information (or conclusions) came from, but Dennis Ross has tried to straighten it out, publicly and in two letters to him. At any rate, I'm grateful. Sincerely, Bill Clinton."

On January 11, 2007, according to the Associated Press, "Fourteen members of an advisory board to Jimmy Carter's human rights organization," the Carter Center, "resigned ... to protest his new book." In their "letter of resignation," as reported by the AP, the "departing members of the Center's Board of Councilors told Carter ... 'You have clearly abandoned your historic role of broker in favor of becoming an advocate for one side'." The Carter Center's Board of Councilors, from which the fourteen members resigned, consists of over 200 members. Prior to those fourteen resignations, Kenneth W. Stein had already resigned from the board in protest against what he states are the book's "errors".

The Central Conference of American Rabbis (CCAR), canceled a planned visit to Carter's human rights center, stating that Palestine: Peace Not Apartheid unfairly criticizes Israel: "The book contains numerous distortions of history and interpretation and apparently, outright fabrications as well. Its use of the term 'apartheid' to describe conditions in the West Bank serves only to demonize and de-legitimize Israel in the eyes of the world." Representatives of the CCAR assert that President Carter's "attempted rehabilitation of such terrorist groups as Hezbollah and Hamas demonstrated either a clear anti-Israel bias and criticizes him for implying that there has been "a 'Jewish conspiracy' at work to discourage conversation about the Palestinians' plight."

On December 11, 2006, National Public Radio reported that "Rabbi Marvin Hier, the founder and dean of the Simon Wiesenthal Center, says his organization has received over 20,000 letters of complaint, so far, against President Carter."

==== Academics ====
Dennis Ross said in an interview on The Situation Room on CNN that Carter's interpretation of the maps in Palestine: Peace Not Apartheid is "just simply wrong." Whereas in his book Carter presents the maps as an "Israeli interpretation of the Clinton idea", according to Ross, who played a key role in shaping the Clinton administration's efforts to bring peace to the region, the maps in fact represented Clinton's proposals exactly. Responding to a question posed by CNN anchor Wolf Blitzer, Ross stated that Carter was also "wrong" to suggest that Israel had rejected the American proposals at Camp David: "[T]his is a matter of record. This is not a matter of interpretation." Ross concluded: "President Carter made a major contribution to peace in the Middle East. That's the reality. I would like him to meet the same standard that he applied then to what he's doing now."

Alan Dershowitz, a professor of law at Harvard Law School, claims that Carter's book is "riddled with errors and bias." Dershowitz argues that there are factual inaccuracies in Palestine: Peace Not Apartheid, including its statement that "Israel launched a preemptive attack on Jordan", observing that, in the 1967 Six-Day War, "Jordan attacked Israel first, Israel tried desperately to persuade Jordan to remain out of the war, and Israel counterattacked after the Jordanian army surrounded Jerusalem, firing missiles into the center of the city."

In an open letter published in The New York Sun, Kenneth W. Stein, Director of the Institute for the Study of Modern Israel of Emory University, who was the founder of the Middle East program at the Carter Center and the center's first director (February 1984 – 1986), presents criticisms of the book as follows: "President Carter's book on the Middle East, a title too inflammatory to even print, is not based on unvarnished analysis; it is replete with factual errors, copied materials not cited, superficialities, glaring omissions, and simply invented segments." In his letter sent to President Carter and others, Stein also observes: "Aside from the one-sided nature of the book, meant to provoke, there are recollections cited from meetings where I was the third person in the room, and my notes of those meetings show little similarity to points claimed in the book." He adds: "Being a former President does not give one a unique privilege to invent information or to unpack it with cuts, deftly slanted to provide a particular outlook. Having little access to Arabic and Hebrew sources, I believe, clearly handicapped his understanding and analyses of how history has unfolded over the last decade." At the end of the first week of December, Karen DeYoung reported that Stein had not yet provided a full outline of such alleged factual errors in the book.

Rebecca Trounson reports in the Los Angeles Times: Stein presented details of the book's perceived errors; among the most serious, Stein says that Carter misrepresented UN Resolution 242 and gave a false account of a meeting held with former Syrian President Hafez al-Assad in 1990, which Stein attended and has the transcript of.

Gil Troy, professor of history at McGill University, opines: "[I]f Carter is so innocent as to be unaware of the resonance that term has [apartheid], [then] he is not the expert on the Middle East or world affairs he purports to be." He elaborates:

Sadly, Israelis and Palestinians do not enjoy the kind of harmony the Israeli Declaration of Independence envisioned. Carter and his comrades use "Apartheid" as shorthand to condemn some of the security measures improvised recently. ... Israel built a security fence to protect its citizens and separate Palestinian enclaves from Israeli cities. Ironically, that barrier marks Israel's most dramatic recognition of Palestinian aspirations to independence since Israel signed the Oslo Accords in 1993. ... Applying the Apartheid label tries to ostracize Israel by misrepresenting some of the difficult decisions Israel has felt forced to make in fighting Palestinian terror.

In an article published on January 20, 2007, in The Washington Post, Deborah Lipstadt, the Dorot Professor of Modern Jewish and Holocaust Studies at Emory University, criticized Carter for what she calls his "Jewish Problem", complaining that, now "facing a storm of criticism, he has relied on anti-Semitic stereotypes in defense." In a more-recent public appearance at a rally in London, in the first week of February 2007, Lipstadt charged that, in this book, Carter engages in what she terms "soft-core denial". According to Paul, "She received huge applause when she asked how former US President Jimmy Carter could omit the years 1939–1947 from a chronology in his book"; referring to him and to Palestine: Peace Not Apartheid, she said: "When a former president of the United States writes a book on the Israeli–Palestinian crisis and writes a chronology at the beginning of the book in order to help them understand the emergence of the situation and in that chronology lists nothing of importance between 1939 and 1947, that is soft-core denial."

=== Carter's response to criticism of the book ===
Carter has responded to negative reviews in the mainstream news media in an op-ed published in the Los Angeles Times (which was excerpted in the British newspaper The Guardian and elsewhere):

Book reviews in the mainstream media have been written mostly by representatives of Jewish organizations who would be unlikely to visit the occupied territories, and their primary criticism is that the book is anti-Israel. Two members of Congress have been publicly critical. Incoming House Speaker Nancy Pelosi for instance, issued a statement (before the book was published) saying that "he does not speak for the Democratic Party on Israel." Some reviews posted on Amazon.com call me "anti-Semitic," and others accuse the book of "lies" and "distortions." A former Carter Center fellow has taken issue with it, and Alan Dershowitz called the book's title "indecent." Out in the real world, however, the response has been overwhelmingly positive. I've signed books in five stores, with more than 1,000 buyers at each site. I've had one negative remark—that I should be tried for treason—and one caller on C-SPAN said that I was an anti-Semite. My most troubling experience has been the rejection of my offers to speak, for free, about the book on university campuses with high Jewish enrollment and to answer questions from students and professors. I have been most encouraged by prominent Jewish citizens and members of Congress who have thanked me privately for presenting the facts and some new ideas.

As Greg Bluestein of the Associated Press observes, Carter replied generally to charges by Ross, Dershowitz, Stein, and others that his book contains errors and inaccuracies by pointing out that the Carter Center staff as well as an "unnamed 'distinguished' reporter" fact-checked it. On Larry King Live in late November 2006, Larry King quoted Alan Dershowitz's saying that Carter's "use of the loaded word 'apartheid'[,] suggesting an analogy to the hated policies of South Africa[,] is especially outrageous" and asked the former president: "What's the analogy? Why use the word apartheid?" Carter replied:

Well, he [Dershowitz] has to go to the first word in the title, which is "Palestine," not "Israel." He should go to the second word in the title, which is "Peace." And then the last two words [are] "Not Apartheid." I never have alleged in the book or otherwise that Israel, as a nation, was guilty of apartheid. But there is a clear distinction between the policies within the nation of Israel and within the occupied territories that Israel controls[,] and the oppression of the Palestinians by Israeli forces in the occupied territories is horrendous. And it's not something that has been acknowledged or even discussed in this country. (Italics added.)

With regard to the criticisms of Kenneth W. Stein, Carter has also pointed out "that Stein hadn't played a role in the Carter Center in 13 years and that his post as a fellow was an honorary title. 'When I decided to write this book, I didn't even think about involving Ken, from ancient times, to come in and help.'" Carter's biographer Douglas Brinkley has observed that Stein and Carter have a "passionate, up-and-down relationship" and that Stein has criticized some of Carter's previous statements about Israel. In response to Professor Stein's current criticism of the book, representatives of its publisher, Simon & Schuster, state: "We haven't seen these allegations, we haven't seen any specifics, and I have no way of assessing anything he [Stein] has said. ... This is all about nothing. We stand behind the book fully, and the fact that there has been a divided reaction to it is not surprising."

As cited in various news accounts, "Carter has consistently defended his book's accuracy against Stein and other critics"; in a prepared statement, Carter's press secretary Deanna Congileo responds "that Carter had his book reviewed for accuracy throughout the writing process" and that "[a]s with all of President Carter's previous books, any detected errors will be corrected in later editions."

In response to the Associated Press's request for a comment on the aforementioned resignations of Stein and fourteen other members of the center's Board of Councilors, speaking on behalf of both Carter and the Carter Center, Ms. Congileo also provided a statement from its executive director John Hardman, who, according to Zelkowitz, "also fact checked Palestine, saying that the members of that board 'are not engaged in implementing the work of the Center.'"

After receiving 25,000 petitions against his book presented to him by the Simon Wiesenthal Center, former President Carter sent a hand-written one-sentence note dated January 26, 2007, to the center's dean and founder, Rabbi Marvin Hier, which the organization posted on its website, in which Carter states: "I don't believe that Simon Wiesenthal would have resorted to falsehood and slander to raise funds." The Associated Press reports that, "facing continuing controversy over his new book on the Israeli–Palestinian conflict", former President Jimmy Carter "issued a letter ... to American Jews explaining his use of the term 'apartheid' and sympathizing with Israelis who fear terrorism." Jimmy Carter's "A Letter to Jewish Citizens of America" is posted on the website of the Carter Center. Further commentaries based on this letter are quoted by John Kelly in his article "The Middle East: Are Critics of Israel Stifled?" in The Atlanta Journal-Constitution of December 17, 2006.

In an op-ed published on December 20, 2006, in The Boston Globe, Carter rejects critics of his book as not actually having addressed the major points contained in it:

Not surprisingly, an examination of the book reviews and published comments reveals that these points have rarely if ever been mentioned by detractors of the book, much less denied or refuted. Instead, there has been a pattern of ad hominem statements, alleging that I am a liar, plagiarist, anti-Semite, racist, bigot, ignorant, etc. There are frequent denunciations of fabricated "straw man" accusations: that I have claimed that apartheid exists within Israel; that the system of apartheid in Palestine is based on racism; and that Jews control and manipulate the news media of America. Carter concludes:As recommended by the Hamilton-Baker report, renewed negotiations between Israel and the Palestinians are a prime factor in promoting peace in the region. Although my book concentrates on the Palestinian territories, I noted that the report also recommended peace talks with Syria concerning the Golan Heights. Both recommendations have been rejected by Israel's prime minister. It is practically impossible for bitter antagonists to arrange a time, place, agenda, and procedures that are mutually acceptable, so an outside instigator/promoter is necessary. Successful peace talks were orchestrated by the United States in 1978–79 and by Norway in 1993. If the American government is reluctant to assume such a unilateral responsibility, then an alternative is the International Quartet (United States, Russia, the United Nations, and the European Union)—still with American leadership. An overwhelming majority of citizens of Israel, Lebanon, Jordan, Egypt, and Palestine want peace, with justice for all who live in the Holy Land. It will be a shame if the world community fails to help them reach this goal.

- Multiple deaths of innocent civilians have occurred on both sides, and this violence and all terrorism must cease
- For 39 years, Israel has occupied Palestinian land, and has confiscated and colonized hundreds of choice sites
- Often excluded from their former homes, land, and places of worship, protesting Palestinians have been severely dominated and oppressed. There is forced segregation between Israeli settlers and Palestine's citizens, with a complex pass system required for Arabs to traverse Israel's multiple checkpoints
- An enormous wall snakes through populated areas of what is left of the West Bank, constructed on wide swaths of bulldozed trees and property of Arab families, obviously designed to acquire more territory and to protect the Israeli colonies already built. (Hamas declared a unilateral cease-fire in August 2004 as its candidates sought local and then national offices, which they claim is the reason for reductions in casualties to Israeli citizens.)
- Combined with this wall, Israeli control of the Jordan River Valley will completely enclose Palestinians in their shrunken and divided territory. Gaza is surrounded by a similar barrier with only two openings, still controlled by Israel. The crowded citizens have no free access to the outside world by air, sea, or land
- The Palestinian people are now being deprived of the necessities of life by economic restrictions imposed on them by Israel and the United States because 42 percent voted for Hamas candidates in this year's election. Teachers, nurses, policemen, firemen and other employees cannot be paid, and the UN has reported food supplies in Gaza equivalent to those among the poorest families in sub-Sahara Africa, with half the families surviving on one meal a day
- Mahmoud Abbas, first as prime minister and now as president of the Palestinian National Authority and leader of the PLO, has sought to negotiate with Israel for almost six years, without success. Hamas leaders support such negotiations, promising to accept the results if approved by a Palestinian referendum
- UN Resolutions, the Camp David Accords of 1978, the Oslo Agreement of 1993, official US Policy, and the International Roadmap for Peace are all based on the premise that Israel withdraw from occupied territories. Also, Palestinians must accept the same commitment made by the 23 Arab nations in 2002: to recognize Israel's right to live in peace within its legal borders. These are the two keys to peace

In a report updated by the Associated Press after the publication of Carter's "Letter to Jewish Citizens of America", Greg Bluestein observes that Carter replied generally to complaints of the book's errors and inaccuracies by Dennis Ross, Alan Dershowitz, Kenneth Stein, the Simon Wiesenthal Center, and others by pointing out that the Carter Center staff as well as an "unnamed 'distinguished' reporter" fact-checked it. Rachel Zelkowitz points out that, as cited in various news accounts, "Carter has consistently defended his book's accuracy against Stein and other critics"; in a prepared statement, Carter's press secretary Deanna Congileo responds "that Carter had his book reviewed for accuracy throughout the writing process" and that "[a]s with all of President Carter's previous books, any detected errors will be corrected in later editions ..." In response to the Associated Press's request for a comment on the resignations of Stein and 14 other members of the Center's Board of Councilors, speaking on behalf of both Carter and the Carter Center, Congileo provided a statement from its executive director, John Hardman, who, according to Zelkowitz, "also fact checked Palestine, saying that the members of that board 'are not engaged in implementing the work of the Center.'"

== Public and other programs pertaining to the book ==
Carter said that debate on Israel-related issues was muffled in the US media by lobbying efforts of the pro-Israel lobby: "[M]any controversial issues concerning Palestine and the path to peace for Israel are intensely debated among Israelis and throughout other nations—but not in the United States. ... This reluctance to criticize any policies of the Israeli government is because of the extraordinary lobbying efforts of the American-Israel Political Action Committee [sic] and the absence of any significant contrary voices." He expressed hope that the book would help to "precipitate discussion and help restart peace talks (now absent for six years) that can lead to permanent peace for Israel and its neighbours.

=== Brandeis University visit ===
In early December 2006, Brandeis University invited Carter to visit the university to debate his book with lawyer, professor and prominent supporter of Israel Alan Dershowitz. Carter declined that invitation, explaining: "I don't want to have a conversation even indirectly with Dershowitz. There is no need to for me to debate somebody who, in my opinion, knows nothing about the situation in Palestine." Carter said that the Brandeis debate request "is proof that many in the United States are unwilling to hear an alternative view on the nation's most taboo foreign policy issue, Israel's occupation of Palestinian territory," adding: "There is no debate in America about anything that would be critical of Israel."

Dershowitz criticized Carter's refusal to debate him, asserting: "Carter’s refusal to debate wouldn't be so strange if it weren't for the fact that he claims that he wrote the book precisely so as to start debate over the issue of the Israel-Palestine peace process. If that were really true, Carter would be thrilled to have the opportunity to debate." He later wrote in The Case Against Israel's Enemies that Carter's accusation of his ignorance was untrue "since we had discussed my several visits to the Palestinian Authority during our conversation only months earlier in Herzliya."

In a Boston Globe article of 22 December 2006, Patricia Johnston said that she and many colleagues had offered to chip in perhaps $100 each to pay for whatever travel and security costs a Carter visit would entail. "Who is Alan Dershowitz?" Johnston said. Carter "is the former president of the United States, who has done so much to further the cause of peace in the Middle East and elsewhere. It's an insult to suggest that he should have to defend himself that way." She said she envisioned Carter giving a traditional speech and taking audience questions.

On 26 December 2006, WCVB-TV, an ABC-TV affiliate, reported that "[a]bout 100 students, faculty and alumni of Brandeis University have signed an online petition to push the administration to bring former President Carter to campus to discuss his new book on Palestine, without being required to debate it."

The Boston Globe reported that since it initially revealed "that Carter felt unwelcome on the Waltham campus, people have argued over whether he is unwilling to answer for his views, or whether Brandeis, which was founded by the American Jewish community, can't tolerate criticism of Israel. The latter is a view that some professors hope they can dispel by reviving the Carter visit."

On 10 January 2007, it was reported that Carter would discuss Palestine Peace Not Apartheid at Brandeis University but that he would "not, however, debate the book with" Dershowitz. Brandeis officials reported that Carter would "be the first former president to visit Brandeis since Harry Truman delivered the commencement address in 1957.... It will be Carter's first visit to a university to discuss the book, [Carter's spokeswoman Deanna] Congileo said", confirming also "the president has set no conditions and would answer as many questions as possible"; Carter plans to "speak for about 15 minutes and then answer questions for 45 minutes during the visit."

The speech, which occurred on 23 January 2007, was "closed to the public and limited to 'members of the university community only'"; nevertheless, Dershowitz said that he still planned to "attend and question Carter": "'I will be the first person to have my hand up to ask him a question,' he said. 'I guarantee that they won't stop me from attending.'"

On 18 January 2007, news outlets reported Brandeis's announcement that while Dershowitz could not attend Carter's speech, after it ended he would have the stage for a "rebuttal."

The day after the speech (24 January 2007), The New York Times reported on the program: "Questions were preselected by the committee that invited Mr. Carter, and the questioners included an Israeli student and a Palestinian student. After Mr. Carter left, Mr. Dershowitz spoke in the same gymnasium, saying that the former president oversimplified the situation and that his conciliatory and sensible-sounding speech at Brandeis belied his words in some other interviews." According to David Weber of ABC News, Carter said "that he stood by the book and its title, that he apologized for what he called an 'improper and stupid' sentence in the book [which he acknowledged seemed to justify terrorism by saying that suicide bombings should end when Israel accepts the goals of the road map to peace with Palestinians and which he had already instructed his publisher to remove from its future editions,] and that he had been disturbed by accusations that he was anti-Semitic.... [Carter]...acknowledged...that 'Palestine Peace Not Apartheid' has 'caused great concern in the Jewish community,' but noted that it has nonetheless prompted discussion." An editorial published in the Waltham, Massachusetts newspaper, the Daily News Tribune, concludes: "Carter succeeded in bringing to Brandeis a productive, civil debate." Videotaped excerpts from Carter's visit to Brandeis were featured on several national news programs in the United States, such as NBC's morning program Today, along with follow-up interviews with Carter.

As a result of the visit, major donors told Brandeis University that they would no longer give it money in "retaliation", according to Stuart E. Eizenstat, Domestic Affairs Advisor during Carter's presidency and a former trustee of Brandeis, as quoted in The Jewish Week in mid-February 2007.

=== Man from Plains documentary ===
In 2007, Jonathan Demme directed the documentary film Man from Plains, which "follows the former President as he takes part in a book tour across America to publicise his new tome, Palestine Peace Not Apartheid." According to The Boston Globe, Demme filmed Carter for three months "to compile footage for a documentary about the former president's book and Carter's efforts to increase debate on the Israeli–Palestinian conflict." While it granted camera access to members of the news media for their broadcasts, Brandeis University refused Demme's request to film Carter's January 2007 speech for the end of the film, citing logistical and legal considerations. The film debuted at the Toronto International Film Festival on 10 September 2007.

=== Carter Center conversation ===
On 22 February 2007, Carter participated in a conversation about Palestine Peace Not Apartheid with former Secretary of State Madeleine Albright (who also served on the National Security Council during the Carter presidency) at the Carter Center, moderated by Conflict Resolution Program Director Matthew Hodes. The event sold out in early January 2007. It was simultaneously webcast in the Carter Center's online "multi-media" section, and the Center's website now includes a direct link to the "archived webcast."

=== University of Iowa visit ===
Pointing out that "The former president rarely speaks about his book at universities. He says he’s been invited to more than 100 campuses, but he's only visited five," Claire Keller reported that, during his public appearance at the University of Iowa, in Iowa City, on 18 April 2007, Carter said, "I wrote this book to describe the plight of the Palestinians and because I'm convinced we desperately need debate about where we are and where we ought to be going, and how to rejuvenate the non-existent peace process in the Middle East" ... [and that] Carter says the book's objective is permanent peace for Israel and its neighbors; it's something the former president says he's dedicated his entire adult life to.

Keller wrote that "Many in attendance applaud his efforts" but that "others criticize the author, claiming his book contains factual errors and misstatements. Members of the local Jewish community say it's simply one-sided." She quotes Tali Ariav of the Hillel Jewish Student Center on the Iowa campus, who said, "'I am an Israeli so of course I served in the military, so I feel emotionally involved, but I feel every person, every American, every thinker needs to think twice about Carter's opinion, because it's not right' ..." Nevertheless, Keller added, "Carter adamantly defends the accuracy of his book, saying he wrote every word himself."

=== University of California, Irvine visit ===
On 3 May 2007, Carter presented a lecture and participated in a discussion relating to the book in conjunction with the Center for the Study of Democracy and Model United Nations, in association with the Center for Citizen Peacebuilding, Department of Political Science, at the University of California, Irvine. According to Carter's lecture transcript, in answering a question on whether conflict between pro- and anti-Israel student groups obstructs chances of peace, he said, "I think an altercation or debate or sometimes even an uncomfortable confrontation on a college campus in America is a good move in the right direction. But I would like to see the leaders of those two groups form a combined group that would take advantage of my invitation to go to Palestine and see what’s going on."

== See also ==
- Carter Center
- Israeli apartheid
- Arab–Israeli conflict
- Israeli–Palestinian conflict
- Israeli–Palestinian peace process
- Israeli West Bank barrier
- Palestine
