= Anti-Terrorism Act of 2001 =

Criminal law in New York, US

The Anti-Terrorism Act of 2001 (S. 70002, 194th Leg., 2d Spec. Sess., 2001 N.Y. Laws Ch. 300) is a New York criminal law passed in the wake of the September 11, 2001, terrorist attacks, that created a new section of the New York Penal Code for terrorism-related crimes, Article 490 (N.Y. Penal Law § 490.00 et seq.). The bill was introduced in a special session of the New York State Legislature on September 17, 2001. It was passed by overwhelming majorities of both houses and signed into law by Governor George Pataki the same day.

== Provisions ==
=== New terrorism-related crimes ===
The Anti-Terrorism Act of 2001 created six crimes related to terrorism. They are:

1. Soliciting or providing support for an act of terrorism in the second degree, a class D felony (§ 490.10)
2. Soliciting or providing support for an act of terrorism in the first degree, a class C felony (§ 490.15)
3. Making a terroristic threat, a class D felony (§ 490.20)
4. Crime of terrorism (§ 490.25)
5. Hindering prosecution of terrorism in the second degree, a class C felony (§ 490.30)
6. Hindering prosecution of terrorism in the first degree, a class B felony (§ 490.35)

=== Soliciting or providing support for an act of terrorism ===
Sections 490.10 and 490.15 make it a crime to intentionally provide or solicit "material support or resources" to be used in an act of terrorism. Material support can include almost any assistance to an act of terrorism, including: money, training, logistics, personnel, or weapons. When the material support provided to an act of terrorism exceeds $1000, the offense is in the first degree.

=== Making a terroristic threat ===
Section 490.20 makes it a felony to threaten to commit an act of terrorism when the threat "causes a reasonable expectation or fear of the imminent commission of such offense." Even if the defendant does not intend to carry out the threat, or is physically unable to do so, he may be charged with violating section 490.20.

=== Crime of terrorism ===
Unlike the other provisions of the law, section 490.25, “crime of terrorism,” does not directly create a standalone charge. It instead allows the state to charge defendants with committing certain felonies as crimes of terrorism. For a violation of section 490.25 the elements of the crime and the level of the offense are dependent upon the severity of an underlying “specified offense.”

Section 490.25(1): A person is guilty of a crime of terrorism when, with intent to intimidate or coerce a civilian population, influence the policy of a unit of government by intimidation or coercion, or affect the conduct of a unit of government by murder, assassination or kidnapping, he or she commits a specified offense.

Under the definition in the Act, a “specified offense” is any non-drug class A felony, any violent felony, second-degree manslaughter, or first-degree criminal tampering. To convict someone of the crime of terrorism, a prosecutor must show first, the defendant is guilty of the underlying “specified act” and second, the specified act was committed with the intent to “to intimidate or coerce a civilian population, influence the policy of a unit of government by intimidation or coercion, or affect the conduct of a unit of government by murder, assassination or kidnapping.” Once the prosecutor shows these elements, a conviction under section 490.25 is treated as a sentencing enhancement to the specified offense. A conviction for a specified offense as a crime of terrorism that is typically a class C, D, or E felony is sentenced as a class B, C, or D felony respectively. A conviction for a class B felony as a crime of terrorism is sentenced as a class A-I felony, and a conviction for a class A-I felony as a crime of terrorism results in a mandatory life sentence without parole.

=== Hindering prosecution of terrorism ===
Sections 490.30 and 490.35 applied the already existing crime of "hindering prosecution" to the terrorism context. While existing law made the most serious crime of hindering prosecution a class D felony, the Anti-Terrorism Act made hindering the prosecution of terrorism a class C felony in most cases. However, when the act of terrorism involved death, hindering its prosecution is a class B felony.

== Legislative history ==
On September 16, 2001, Governor George Pataki called a special session of the New York State Legislature in the wake of the 9/11 attacks. On September 17, three laws, including the Anti-Terrorism Act of 2001, were introduced, passed by both houses of the legislature, and signed into law by the governor.

The most notable of these laws was Senate Bill 70002, the Anti-Terrorism Act of 2001, sponsored by Senator Michael Balboni. The Act passed by a vote of 53–1 in the Senate and 131–6 in the Assembly. The legislative findings, enacted in the final law, noted recent terrorist attacks, including multiples in New York, and a lack of existing state laws in the United States to prosecute terrorism as a separate crime. In his memo supporting the law, Senator Balboni, expanded on this, stating:

Terrorism is a serious and deadly problem that threatens individual safety both at home and around the world. A comprehensive state law is thus urgently needed in New York to complement federal counter terrorist efforts and eliminate terrorism, while bringing terrorists and their supporters to justice. The bill enacts fundamental reforms and sends a powerful message that New York will do everything possible to wipe out the evils of terrorism.

In June 2001, Senator Balboni had introduced a nearly identical bill, Senate Bill 05646. That bill would have enacted the same six crimes into law and passed the Senate 57–1 on June 20, 2001, but never received a vote in the Assembly. After the Assembly adopted the nearly-identical Anti-Terrorism Act in September by an overwhelming margin, Speaker Sheldon Silver said, “[i]t may very well be overkill, but at this time I think it's important to show the unity of our purpose and not question political motives.”

== Scope of "terrorism" under the Act ==
The Anti-Terrorism Act defines an “act of terrorism” as a “specified offense” (see above, almost exclusively a violent felony) committed with the intent to: "(i) intimidate or coerce a civilian population; (ii) influence the policy of a unit of government by intimidation or coercion; or (iii) affect the conduct of a unit of government by murder, assassination or kidnapping." The provision for making a terroristic threat incorporates the same standard, when the threat to commit terrorism “causes a reasonable expectation or fear of the imminent commission of such offense.” Read expansively, this definition of terrorism has the ability to encompass large categories of violence, even those not traditionally thought of as terrorism.

=== Crimes to intimidate or coerce a civilian population ===
In its only opinion on the scope of the law, the New York Court of Appeals limited the scope of the law and overturned a terrorism conviction where the underlying specified offense was a murder committed as part of a rivalry between two gangs. After noting that the Anti-Terrorism Act was enacted in the wake of 9/11 and that the legislative findings mentioned six other instances of terrorism necessitating the law: the Oklahoma City bombing, foreign embassy bombings, Pan-Am Flight 103, 1997 shooting at the Empire State Building, 1994 murder of Ari Halberstam on the Brooklyn Bridge, and the 1993 World Trade Center bombing, the Court found that gang violence was not within the intended scope of the law:

If we were to apply a broad definition to "intent to intimidate or coerce a civilian population," the People could invoke the specter of "terrorism" every time a Blood assaults a Crip or an organized crime family orchestrates the murder of a rival syndicate's soldier. But the concept of terrorism has a unique meaning and its implications risk being trivialized if the terminology is applied loosely in situations that do not match our collective understanding of what constitutes a terrorist act.

Though gang violence falls outside of the scope of the Act, widespread violence is not necessary for a crime to be a crime of terrorism. The 1994 Brooklyn Bridge attack, which resulted in one killed and three wounded is listed in the legislative findings of the Anti-Terrorism Act as a terrorist attack. In 2012, a trial court sustained a terrorism indictment against a defendant accused of plotting to “shoot those attending religious services and to detonate at least one grenade in one synagogue;” the defendant later pleaded guilty. And in 2019 James Jackson pleaded guilty to first degree murder as a crime of terrorism for the 2017 killing Timothy Caughman in an attempt to start a race war.

=== Crimes to affect government policy or conduct ===
In other instances, appellate courts have addressed whether violent threats against the government are terroristic threats. These courts have agreed that threats to kill the Governor unless a terrorist was released, to kill a DA and his family unless the prosecutor dropped a case against the defendant's father, and to kill social service employees unless they changed their enforcement of policies regarding contact between sex offenders and children, were all terroristic threats.

At the same time, these courts have rejected charges of terroristic threats when defendants’ threats to shoot up a police station, or murder a judge, were not tied to specific goals of affecting governmental conduct.

== Subsequent changes to the law ==
In 2004 a new law added offenses to Penal Code Article 490, for crimes related to the possession and use of chemical and biological weapons. This same law also addressed hoaxes and threats of chemical and biological weapons, extended, or eliminated, the statute of limitations for terrorism prosecutions, and created a new subset of money laundering crimes, “money laundering for terroristic purposes,” with enhanced penalties. The original provisions of Article 490 were not substantively amended in this process.

== Notable convictions ==
Despite the enactment of this law, most notable terrorist attacks in New York continued to be prosecuted by federal, not state, authorities. E.g., Times Square attempted car bombing, Westside Highway attack, Chelsea bombing.

The first reported instance of a successful prosecution under the Anti-Terrorism Act was against Donald Jenner, who in March 2005, was convicted of making a terroristic threat against Madison County Department of Social Service workers.

The first conviction for a crime of terrorism in New York City came in 2012 when Ahmed Ferhani pleaded guilty to possessing weapons and a hand grenade as part of a terrorist plot to attack a local synagogue.

The first conviction for a murder as a crime of terrorism occurred when James Jackson pleaded guilty in January 2019, to murder as both a hate crime and a crime of terrorism.
