= Tony Karon =

South African born Journalist, Executive Producer

Tony Karon is a South African-born journalist and former anti-apartheid activist. He became a senior online executive producer for Al Jazeera America in 2013. He was formerly the Senior Editor at Time.com.

Karon grew up Jewish in South Africa and identified as a Zionist. He moved to New York City in 1993. He studied at the University of Cape Town, and in the 1980s, he was a prominent anti-apartheid activist in student movement NUSAS.

He joined TIME Magazine in 1997, and was a senior editor for close to 20 years, providing commentary on world affairs. He had previously worked as an activist for the banned African National Congress in South Africa. In April 2013, he was employed as a senior online executive producer of Al Jazeera's new all-digital video channel, AJ+.
