= Antiterrorism Act of 1992 =

The Antiterrorism Act of 1992 (ATA) is the common name for provisions of U.S. federal law allowing United States nationals to sue in federal court for injuries and losses caused by acts of international terrorism. Congress enacted the provisions on October 29, 1992, as Section 1003 of the Federal Courts Administration Act of 1992 (Public Law 102–572).

The Act's principal civil liability provision is codified at Title 18 of the United States Code, Section 2333, which authorizes successful plaintiffs to recover three times their damages, as well as litigation costs and attorney's fees.

== Legislative history ==
Following the 1985 killing of Leon Klinghoffer aboard the Achille Lauro, his family filed a lawsuit against the Palestine Liberation Organization in federal court. In a 1992 report, the House Judiciary Committee cited the case when discussing proposed legislation that would allow U.S. nationals to sue in federal court for injuries resulting from acts of international terrorism.

In 1990, Senator Chuck Grassley introduced S. 2465, a bill proposing a federal civil remedy for injuries resulting from international terrorism. The provisions were later incorporated into a military construction appropriations bill. The conference committee decided to remove the provisions, but an enrolling clerk mistakenly left them in the final legislation, according to a 1992 Senate Judiciary Committee report. They became law on November 5, 1990, as part of Public Law 101-519.

Congress repealed the provisions on April 10, 1991, with retroactive effect to November 5, 1990. Grassley reintroduced the legislation in 1991 as S. 740, which passed the Senate by voice vote on April 16, 1991. Congress later enacted the civil remedy provisions as Section 1003 of the Federal Courts Administration Act of 1992, signed into law on October 29, 1992.

== Civil liability ==
Under 18 U.S.C. § 2333(a), United States nationals who suffer personal injury, property damage, or business losses as a result of an act of international terrorism may file lawsuits in federal district court. The statute also permits actions by their estates, survivors, and heirs. Successful plaintiffs may recover three times their damages and the costs of litigation, including attorney's fees.

The definition of international terrorism is provided in 18 U.S.C. § 2331. It encompasses certain violent or life-endangering criminal acts intended to intimidate civilian populations or influence government conduct, where the activities occur primarily outside the United States or transcend national boundaries.

The legislation excludes claims for injuries resulting from acts of war. Section 2337 also prohibits actions under the Act against the United States and foreign states, their agencies, and government officers or employees acting in an official capacity or under actual or apparent government authority. The original four-year statute of limitations was extended to ten years in 2013.

== Amendments ==
The Justice Against Sponsors of Terrorism Act, enacted in 2016, expanded civil liability under Section 2333 to permit claims against persons who knowingly provide substantial assistance to, or conspire with, perpetrators of certain acts of international terrorism involving designated foreign terrorist organizations.

The Anti-Terrorism Clarification Act of 2018 amended the Act to deem certain defendants to have consented to personal jurisdiction in federal courts if they accepted specified U.S. assistance or engaged in certain activities in the United States. The Promoting Security and Justice for Victims of Terrorism Act of 2019 replaced those provisions with rules specifically addressing the Palestine Liberation Organization and the Palestinian Authority.

== Judicial interpretation ==
A 2024 study published by George Washington University's Program on Extremism documented approximately 150 lawsuits brought under the Act, generating around 600 judicial opinions. The litigation has addressed questions involving financial support for terrorist organizations, aiding-and-abetting liability, and federal courts' jurisdiction over defendants:

In Boim v. Holy Land Foundation for Relief and Development (2008), the United States Court of Appeals for the Seventh Circuit held that knowingly providing financial support to Hamas could establish civil liability under the Act. The lawsuit was brought by the parents of David Boim, an American teenager killed in Israel in 1996. A $156 million judgment was entered in 2004. In 2008, the Seventh Circuit upheld the judgment against the Islamic Association for Palestine but reversed it against two other defendants. The Holy Land Foundation was found liable again in 2012.

In Linde v. Arab Bank (2018), victims of attacks carried out by Hamas sued Arab Bank, alleging that it had provided financial services to the organization. A jury found the bank liable under the Act in 2014, but the United States Court of Appeals for the Second Circuit vacated the judgment in 2018, ruling that the jury had been incorrectly instructed that providing material support to a terrorist organization necessarily constituted an act of international terrorism. The parties had reached a settlement agreement that eliminated the need for a retrial.

In Twitter, Inc. v. Taamneh (2023), the Supreme Court of the United States considered the scope of aiding-and-abetting liability under the Act. The Court unanimously held that allegations concerning social media companies' provision of services used by the terrorist organization Islamic State were insufficient to establish liability for a particular terrorist attack.

In Sokolow v. Palestine Liberation Organization, American victims of terrorist attacks in Israel and their families obtained a $655.5 million judgment against the Palestine Liberation Organization and Palestinian Authority in 2015. The judgment was vacated in 2016 on jurisdictional grounds. In Fuld v. Palestine Liberation Organization (2025), the Supreme Court of the United States unanimously upheld the constitutionality of a 2019 law allowing federal courts to exercise personal jurisdiction over the defendants in specified circumstances. Following the ruling, the United States Court of Appeals for the Second Circuit reinstated and affirmed the original judgment in March 2026.

== Scholarly analysis ==
Writing in the Washington University Law Review in 2018, legal scholar Maryam Jamshidi criticized the application of Section 2333 to third-party defendants, arguing that judicial interpretations had expanded liability beyond traditional principles of tort law.

== See also ==
- Antiterrorism and Effective Death Penalty Act of 1996
- Foreign Sovereign Immunities Act
