= Fuld v. Palestine Liberation Organization =

Fuld v. Palestine Liberation Organization United States v. Palestine Liberation Organization
- Supreme Court of the United States

Argued April 1, 2025 Decided June 20, 2025
- Full case name: Miriam Fuld, et al. v. Palestine Liberation Organization, et al.
- Docket nos.: 24-20; 24-151
- Citations: 606 U.S. ___ (more)

Case history
- Prior: Dismissed for lack of jurisdiction, 578 F.Supp.3d 577 (S.D.N.Y. 2022). Affirmed, 82 F.4th 74 (2d. Cir. 2023). Rehearing en banc denied, 101 F.4th 190 (2d. Cir. 2024).

Questions presented
- Whether the Promoting Security and Justice for Victims of Terrorism Act's means of establishing personal jurisdiction complies with the Due Process Clause of the Fifth Amendment

Holding
- The PSJVTA’s personal jurisdiction provision does not violate the Fifth Amendment’s Due Process Clause because the statute reasonably ties the assertion of jurisdiction over the PLO and PA to conduct involving the United States and implicating sensitive foreign policy matters within the prerogative of the political branches.

Court membership
- Chief Justice John Roberts Associate Justices Clarence Thomas · Samuel Alito; Sonia Sotomayor · Elena Kagan; Neil Gorsuch · Brett Kavanaugh; Amy Coney Barrett · Ketanji Brown Jackson

Case opinions
- Majority: Roberts, joined by Alito, Sotomayor, Kagan, Kavanaugh, Barrett, Jackson
- Concurrence: Thomas (in judgment), joined by Gorsuch (Part II)

Laws applied
- U.S. Const. amend. V

Fuld v. Palestine Liberation Organization, 606 U.S. ___ (2025) is a Supreme Court of the United States case which held that the personal jurisdiction provision of the Promoting Security and Justice for Victims of Terrorism Act of 2019 (PSJVTA) does not violate the Due Process Clause of the Fifth Amendment. It was argued on April 1, 2025 and may have a profound impact on personal jurisdiction and foreign policy in the United States.

== Background ==
On September 16, 2018, Ari Yoel Fuld, an Israeli-American settler, was stabbed and killed by Khalil Youssef Ali Jabarin, a 17-year-old Palestinian, at a mall in the West Bank. Fuld's family and other victims of terrorism sued the Palestine Liberation Organization (PLO) and Palestinian Authority (PA) under the Promoting Security and Justice for Victims of Terrorism Act of 2019 (PSJVTA). The plaintiffs alleged that the PA and PLO had "encouraged, incentivized, and assisted" terrorism by providing payments to Ali Jabarin for killing Fuld.

In 2019, the PSJVTA amended the federal Anti-Terrorism Act (ATA), which created a right for victims of terrorist attacks committed against Americans outside the United States to sue in U.S. courts.

In the United States, federal courts can only adjudicate cases when they have subject-matter jurisdiction and personal jurisdiction. In 2023, the Supreme Court decided Mallory v. Norfolk Southern Railway Co., holding that defendants could consent to personal jurisdiction. While personal jurisdiction over business and natural persons arises from the Fourteenth Amendment, there is debate about whether the due process limits on personal jurisdiction are the same under the Fifth Amendment.

While Fuld was pending in the district court, the United States Court of Appeals for the Second Circuit decided Waldman v. PLO, holding that it lacked personal jurisdiction over the PLO and PA and that there was little (if any) difference between Fifth and Fourteenth Amendment limits on personal jurisdiction. Applying that precedent, the district court dismissed the case, and the Second Circuit affirmed the dismissal. The plaintiffs sought review in the Supreme Court, and on December 6, 2024, the Supreme Court agreed to hear the case and United States v. PLO together.

== Opinion of the Court ==
On June 20, 2025, in a 9-0 decision, the Supreme Court reversed the Second Circuit's decision that U.S. courts lacked authority to hear cases based on terrorist attacks taking place outside the country.

Chief Justice Roberts wrote the 9–0 decision that the PSJVTA does not violate the due process rights of the PLO and the Palestinian Authority by compelling them to consent to the authority of U.S. courts. "It is permissible for the Federal Government to craft a narrow jurisdictional provision that ensures, as part of a broader foreign policy agenda, that Americans injured or killed by acts of terror have an adequate forum in which to vindicate their right to ATA compensation." The Supreme Court remanded the two cases for further proceedings consistent with its decision.

Justice Thomas wrote a separate concurring opinion, which Justice Gorsuch joined in part. Justice Thomas wrote, "The Fifth Amendment’s Due Process Clause imposes no limits on the Federal Government’s power to extend federal jurisdiction beyond the Nation’s borders."

== See also ==
- 2004 Jerusalem bus 19 bombing
