= Ashkelon Natural Region =

Coordinates: 31°40′07″N 34°34′26″E

- Natural Region
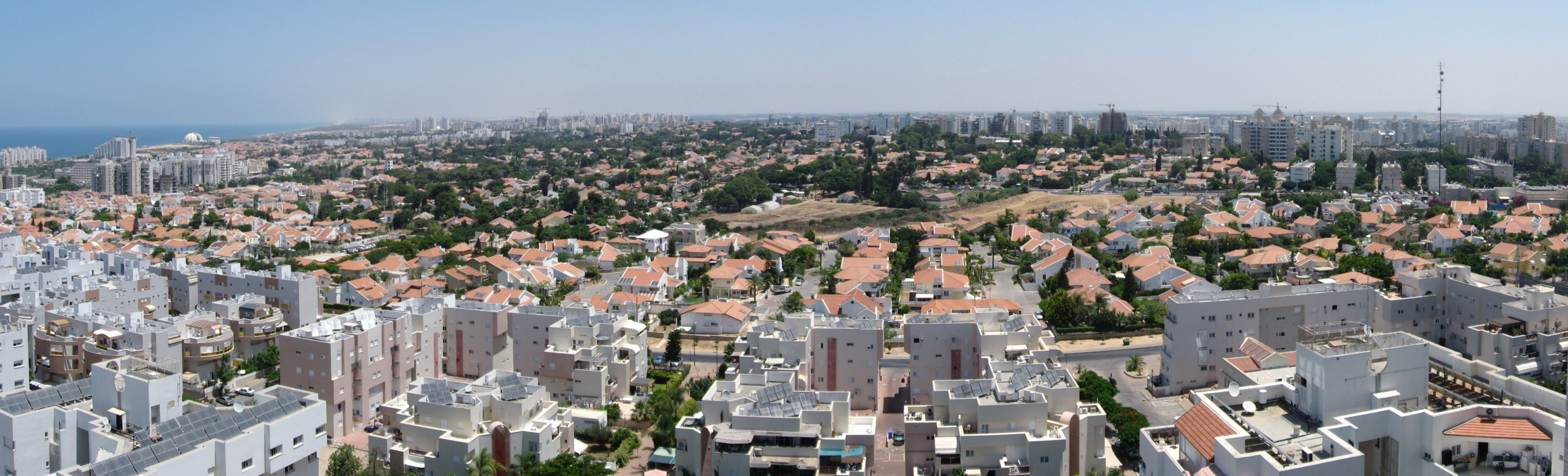
- Panorama of Ashkelon
- Country: Israel
- District: Southern
- Subdistrict: Ashkelon
- Largest City: Ashkelon

Area
  - Total: 408 km^{2} (158 sq mi)

Population (2024)
  - Total: 234,785

Ethnicity
  - Jews and others: 96.3%
  - Arabs: 0.4%

The Ashkelon Natural Region or Ashqelon Natural Region is a natural region in the Ashkelon Subdistrict, in the Southern District of Israel. Ashkelon is the largest city in the natural region.

== Geography ==
Districts, Subdistricts and Natural Regions of the State of Israel, 2018

The natural region consists of a portion of the Israeli coastal plain, south of Ashdod and northeast of the Gaza Strip. It has an area of 408 km^{2}. The largest city in the natural region is Ashkelon, which contains 71 percent of the natural region's population. The only other substantial city in the natural region is Sderot. The natural region contains the Hof Ashkelon and Sha'ar HaNegev regional councils.

== Demographics ==
The vast majority of the residents of the Ashkelon Natural Region are Jewish. There are no Arab towns in the natural region.

Historical population
Year	Pop.	±%
1972	61,200	—
1983	72,900	+19.1%
1995	108,100	+48.3%
2008	149,540	+38.3%
2022	212,494	+42.1%
2024	234,785	+10.5%

== Administrative local authorities ==
Cities	Local Councils	Villages
Ashkelon; Sderot	[None]	Hof Ashkelon: Bat Hadar; Be'er Ganim; Berekhya; Beit Shikma; Ge'a; Gvar'am; Heletz; Hodiya; Karmia; Kfar Silver; Kokhav Michael; Mash'en; Mavki'im; Netiv HaAsara; Nir Yisrael; Nitzan; Nitzan Bet; Nitzanim; Talmei Yafe; Yad Mordechai; Zikim; Sha'ar HaNegev: Bror Hayil; Dorot; Erez; Gevim; Ibim; Kfar Aza; Mefalsim; Nahal Oz; Nir Am; Or HaNer; Ruhama; Yakhini

== Voting Patterns ==
In the 2022 election, 65 percent of voters in the natural region voted for the parties of the right-wing coalition led by Benjamin Netanyahu, while 33 percent voted for the parties of the center-left coalition led by Yair Lapid and 0.2 percent voted for the Arab parties.

In the 2026 election, 61 percent of voters in the natural region voted for the parties of the right-wing coalition led by Benjamin Netanyahu, while 32 percent voted for the parties of the center-left coalition led by Gadi Eisenkot and 0.2 percent voted for the Arab parties. An additional 3.9 percent voted for the Reservists, and 2 percent voted for Amcha Yisrael. Voter turnout increased 26 percent from the 2022 election.
