= HaNoar HaTzioni =

Zionist youth movement

HaNoar HaTzioni הנוער הציוני
- Formation: 1927
- Type: Jewish Youth Movement
- Purpose: Educational
- Region served: Worldwide
- Members: Youth
- Leader: Alexander Bitterman
- Website: www.hholamit.org.il

Hanoar Hatzioni (Hebrew: הנוער הציוני, lit. The Zionist Youth), fully "Histadrut Halutzit Olamit Hanoar Hatzioni", or "HH" for short, is a youth movement established in 1926, with its head offices now in Israel. Its three main pillars are Chalutzism ("pioneering spirit", from the Hebrew word chalutz, "pioneer"), Pluralism, and Zionism. The movement sees Judaism as the source of national, social and moral values that preserve the integrity and continuity of the Jewish people.

The main objective of the HaNoar Hatzioni is Hagshama Atzmit (personal materialization), which among other things means to have a full Jewish life in Israel. For its purposes the movement uses the scout method.

== History of Hanoar ==
During the years following the First World War, two ideological currents ran throughout European youth, Jews included: fascist nationalism and revolutionary Marxism. A small group of enlightened Jewish youths criticised the extremist positions and slogans and concluded that they would not endure reality. At the same time, they sensed the danger caused by the separation and division of people into two opposing camps, fighting each other. They then considered an obligation to create a youth movement.

The year was 1926 when the idea crystallized with the establishment of Hanoar Hatzioni. Already at its beginnings, the movement appeared on the scene as an educational movement extracting its principles at the foundations of Judaism, Haloutism, Humanism, Zionism and pioneering.

=== History of Hanoar in Britain ===
In 1956, Hanoar Hatzioni was established in Britain. During this time, there was little on offer to Jewish youth. Hanoar Hatzioni offered an alternative to the highly political or religiously affiliated Zionist youth movements, and the non-political youth clubs.

During the 1960s, Hanoar Hatzioni in Britain focused its activities in those parts which had very little to offer Jewish youth. Hanoar Hatzioni successfully ran weekly meetings all around the country, residential events such as camps that are continued to this day, and trips to Israel.

== The Hanoar Hatzioni Vision ==
Hanoar has two underlying beliefs: (a) educating the Chanich (participant); and (b) a Jewish-Zionist worldview. Through this it strives to grow the future of the Jewish people with a belief in the centrality of the State of Israel.

=== Judaism ===
Since the times of the Second Temple, Judaism was very heavily engaged in argument and debate – this is what led to the writing of the Talmud. This has continued and Hanoar Hatzioni both accepts and encourages the existence of different streams of thought, philosophical conceptions and ways of practice, within the framework of the modern Jewish spectrum.

Also Hanoar Hatzioni accepts anyone who defines themselves as Jewish, beyond Orthodox Halacha requirements. It strives to create Chanichim with a strong identity of who participants are and what it means to be Jewish.

=== Zionism ===
Their belief is that Zionism can and will bring together the dispersed nation in its historical homeland and that only in Israel can there be a full, normative and Jewish experience for an entire society.

The movement also recognises that there are many different conceptions of Zionism and values them all. However it also recognises the need to rank these different interpretations, with Israel being at the centre. Therefore, Aliyah is the highest expression of Judaism and Zionism and something all graduates (bogrim, singular boger/et) need to place before themselves as part of their self-realisation.

=== Hagshama ===
Hagshama is one of the central pillars of Hanoar Hatzioni and something that all participants must go through in their time in the movement. In the modern world, this means finding the meeting point between personal interests and the needs of the Israeli nation. In Jewish history, before the creation of the State of Israel, hagshama was fulfilled by Kibbutzim. Hanoar Hatzioni hope that the renewed evaluation of the Kibbutz ideals will increase value fulfillment through collective Jewish communities.

== Values ==
Hanoar Hatzioni has 36 values at its conceptual core, they are as follows:

- Sanctity of Life
- Dignity
- Liberty
- Freedom
- Solidarity
- Mutual Support
- Tolerance
- Justice
- Peace
- Truth
- Responsibility
- Equality
- Honesty
- Integrity
- Ethics
- Benevolence
- Pluralism
- Self-realization
- Pioneering
- Fellowship
- Personal Example
- Moratorium
- Continuity
- The Right to Doubt
- Dialogue
- Creativity
- Self-management
- Activism
- Learning
- Intellectual Curiosity
- Leadership
- Modesty/Humility
- Brotherhood
- Independent/Critical Thinking
- Coherence/Consistency
- Self-expression

== Worldwide movement ==
Hanoar Hatzioni is currently located in 17 countries across four different continents, making for a truly global youth movement. Hanoar Hatzioni is active in England, Belgium, Greece, Hungary, Spain, Canada, Mexico, Costa Rica, Ecuador, Colombia, Peru, Chile, Brazil, Paraguay, Uruguay, and Argentina.

Participants and movement leaders (madrichim, singular madrich/a; literally guides) from all the different countries have opportunities to meet each other and interact on a variety of events, be it during Israel Tour, Gap Year, other trips to Israel as well as an annual international "Seminar for Madrichim and Bogrim" (SBM) which in 2010 was hosted in London, 2011 in Antwerp, 2012 in Budapest and 2013 in Athens.

=== Britain ===
Hanoar Hatzioni provides a range of activities are provided for at youth centres in Britain, such as in Southend, King Solomon High School, Kulanu (Kenton), Rowley Lane and Shenley., the Zone in Leeds and the Hub in Manchester

In addition to regular activities, Hanoar Hatzioni UK offers an annual summer camp, Israel Tour and Gap Year Programmes. Hanoar Hatzioni offers a membership scheme.

== Settlements of Hanoar Hatzioni ==
Kibbutzim

- Usha
- HaSolelim
- Kfar Glickson
- Tel Yitzhak
- Nitzanim
- Ein HaShlosha

Moshavim

- Sde David
- Petahya
- Yad Natan
- Timorim
- Nir Yisrael
- Shoresh
- Givat Yeshayahu
- Talmei Yaffe
- Mavki'im
- Kfar Shmuel
- Shilat
- Beit Nehemia
- Beit Yehoshua
- Reihan
- Mei Ami
- Alonei Abba
- Neot Golan
- She'ar Yashuv
- Dishon
- Amnun
- Sde Eliezer
- Massua
