= Caravan site =

Caravan site may refer to:

- Campsite
- Halting site
- Caravan site (Israel), a temporary neighborhood made up of caravans in Israel
