= Ge'a =

Moshav in southern Israel

Ge'a: גיאה (Hebrew)
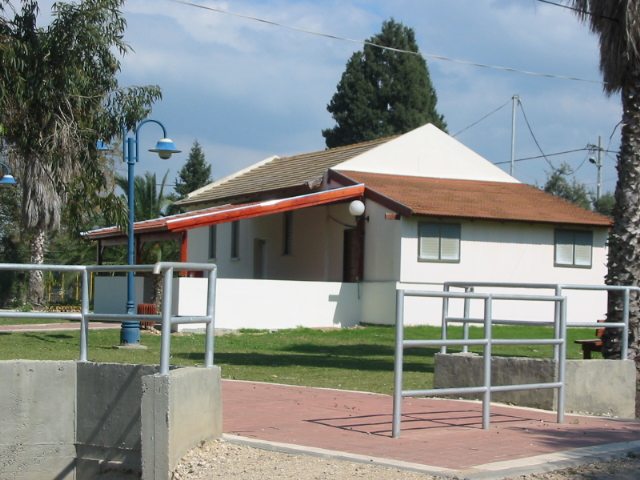
- The moshav synagogue

- Location within Ashkelon region of Israel
- Coordinates: 31°37′37″N 34°36′14″E
- Country: Israel
- District: Southern
- Subdistrict: Ashkelon
- Council: Hof Ashkelon
- Affiliation: Moshavim Movement
- Founded: 1949
- Founder: Czechoslovak and Hungarian Jews
- Population (2024): 771

Ge'a (Hebrew: גֵּיאָה) is a moshav in southern Israel. Located three kilometres south-east of Ashkelon near Beit Shikma and Talmei Yafeh, it falls under the jurisdiction of Hof Ashkelon Regional Council. In 2024 it had a population of 771.

== History ==
The moshav was founded in 1949 by Jewish immigrants from Czechoslovakia and Hungary. It was named after the depopulated Palestinian village of al-Jiyya, on whose land they settled.

This location might be identified as the biblical Giah, although this is disputed.
