= Heletz oil field =

Oil field in Israel

- Location of the Heletz oil field within Israel
- Country: Israel
- Region: Southern District
- Location: Heletz
- Offshore/onshore: Onshore
- Coordinates: 31°34′11.1″N 34°36′57.13″E
- Operator: Avenue Energy

Field history
- Discovery: 1955
- Start of development: 1955
- Start of production: 1960

Production
- Estimated oil in place: 12.9 million tonnes (~ 15.0×10^{6} m^{3} or 94.4 million bbl)

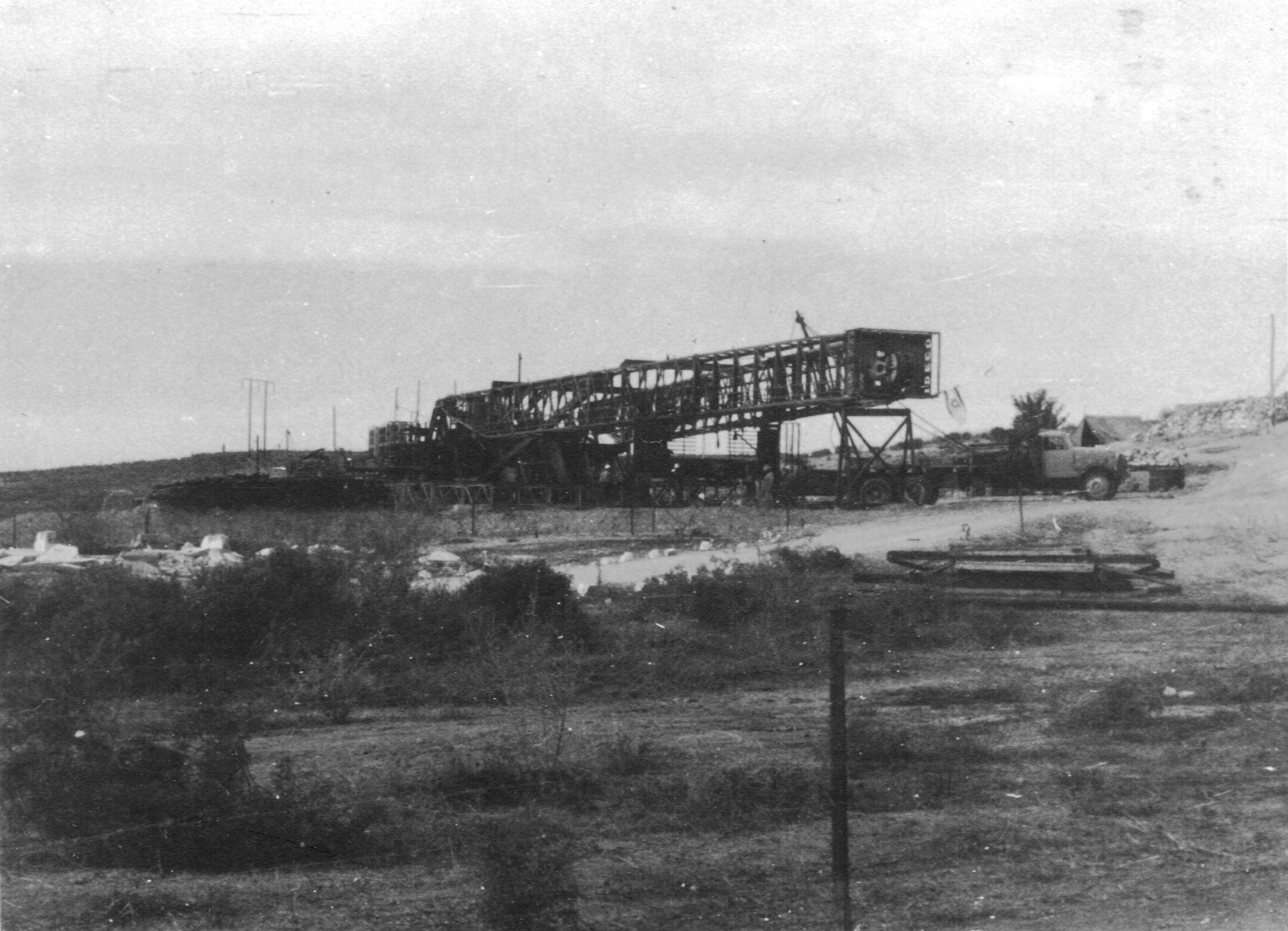
Heletz oil field, 1955

Heletz oil field is an Israeli oil field discovered in 1955.

== History ==
The Petroleum Development (Palestine) Ltd., an exploration subsidiary of the Iraq Petroleum Company had drilled a 3,464 feet hole near Hulayqat in 1947-1948, before they left Mandatory Palestine in February 1948 because of the conflict. Lapidoth Israel Oil Co. and Israel Oil Prospectors, Ltd. deepened the hole and struck oil (30° gravity crude) at 4,906 feet on September 22, 1955. A second pay was found just 40 feet below in October 1955. The well was Israels first producing oil well. David Ben Gurion visited the new well. The Oil and Gas Journal printed an overview of exploration activity across Israel in the 1955-10-03 issue.

A 4-mile 8-inch pipeline was completed in early April 1956, accompanied by 2 elevated 750 ton tanks at the field, from where the oil flowed by gravity at a rate of 40 tons per hour (ca. 7,000 barrels per day) to the nearby railhead at Beit Shikma, from where it was shipped to the Haifa refinery, replacing the previous mode of transport by tanker trucks. At that time, the Heletz No. 3 well had struck oil.

By June 1957, the field was producing at a rate of 2,000bbl/d from 12 producing wells. A new well 2 miles southeast of Heletz No. 10 (the most southeasterly well in the field) struck oil near Broor Haiel at 4,990 feet. Another well 2,600 feet northwest of the new discovery (and closer to Heletz No. 10) had been a dry hole.

Natural gas was found 11 miles south of Heletz in late August or early September 1957. Upon discovery a flame erupted and reached a height of 120 feet and burned for 24 hours.

Heletz is one of the biggest on-shore oil fields in Israel. It began production in 1960 and produces oil. Its oil proven reserves are about 94.4 million barrels (15.01×10^{6} m^{3}).

== See also ==
- Economy of Israel
