= Barbara, Gaza =

Former village in Gaza subdistrict

Barbara برْبره Berbere
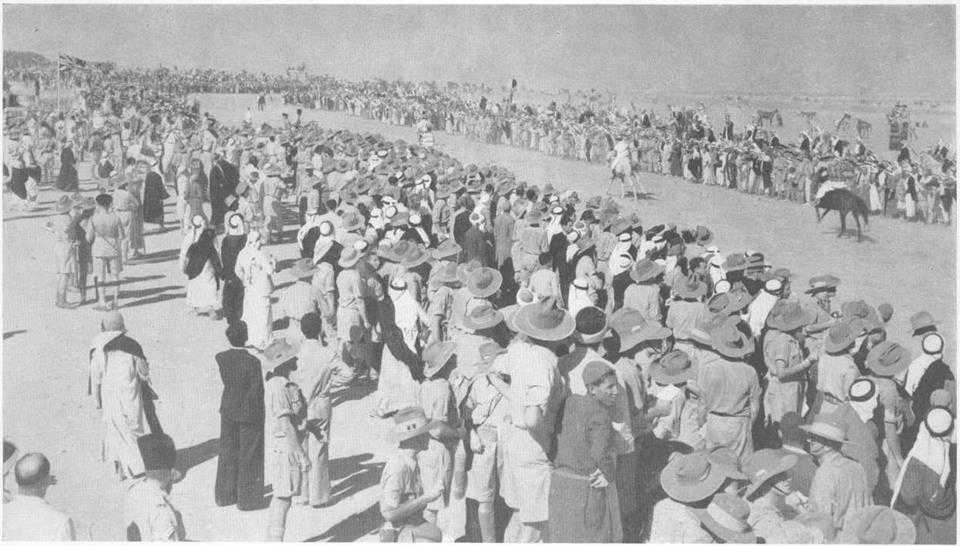
- A horse race held at Barbara, Palestine, 7 September 1940, with Australian 6th Division troops watching
- Etymology: "Chattering", "barbarians"
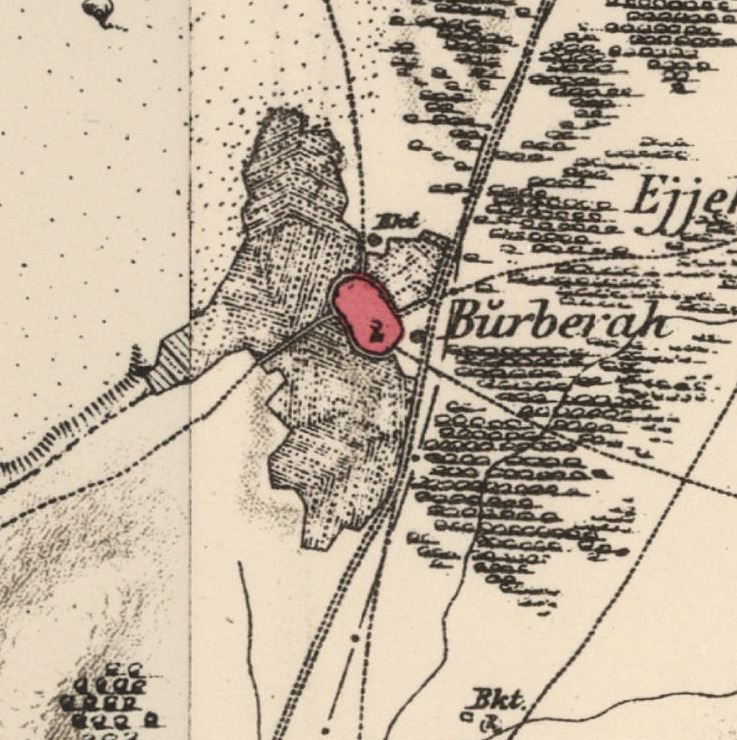
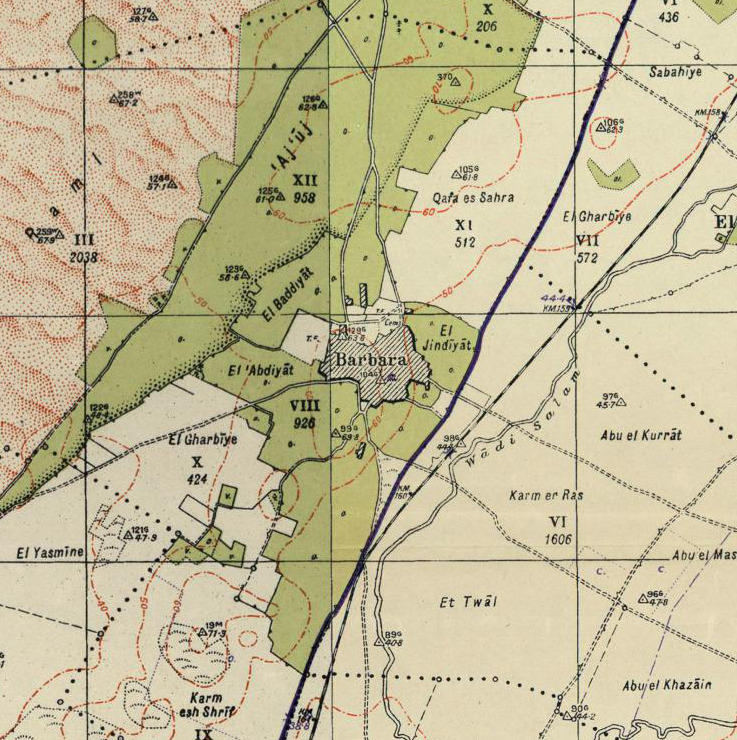
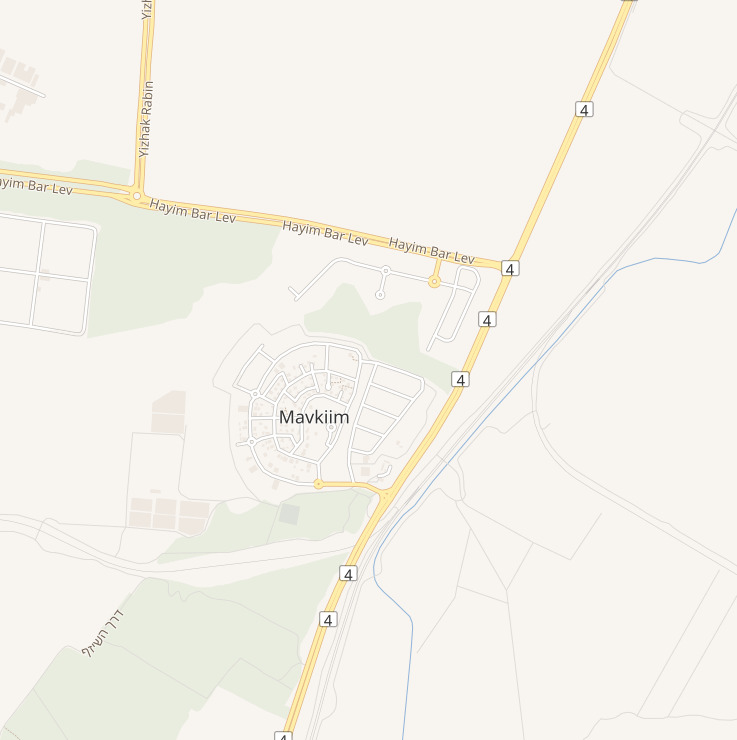
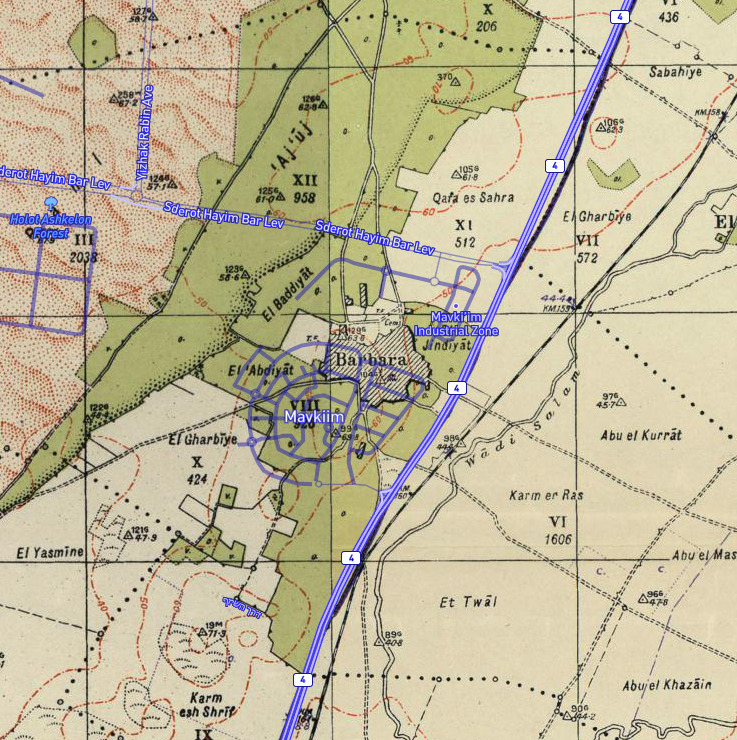
- 1870s map 1940s map modern map 1940s with modern overlay map A series of historical maps of the area around Barbara, Gaza (click the buttons)

- Location within Mandatory Palestine
- Coordinates: 31°37′26″N 34°34′46″E
- Palestine grid: 110/114
- Geopolitical entity: Mandatory Palestine
- Subdistrict: Gaza
- Date of depopulation: 5 November 1948

Area
  - Total: 13,978 dunams (13.978 km^{2}; 5.397 sq mi)

Population (1945)
  - Total: 2,410
- Cause(s) of depopulation: Military assault by Yishuv forces
- Current Localities: Mavki'im, Talmei Yafeh

Barbara (Arabic: برْبره) was a Palestinian Arab village in the Gaza Subdistrict located 17 km northeast of Gaza city, in the vicinity of modern Ashkelon. It had an entirely Arab population of 2,410 in 1945. The village consisted of nearly 14,000 dunums of which approximately 12,700 dunums was able to be cultivated. It was captured by Israel during the 1948 Arab–Israeli War.

== History ==
Barbara received its modern name from the Romans. After the Roman rule the village was under the control of a number of empires and dynasties ranging from the Byzantines, various Islamic Arab dynasties, the Crusaders, the Turkish Mamluks, Ottomans and finally the British Empire.

Archeological building and pottery remains from the Late Roman and the Byzantine periods have been excavated here. Coins minted under Nero, Valentinian II, Theodosius I, Justin I and Justinian I were also found. A winepress, dating from the Byzantine period has been found. A coin, dating from the Umayyad era (697–750 CE) has also been found here.

According to the Arab geographer Mujir al-Din (1456–1522), the village was home to the Muslim scholar Sheikh Yusuf al-Barbarawi, a local sage and a student of renowned scholar Ahmad ibn Dawud, who died in 1323. Barbara was inhabited in the 15th century. Mamluk records mention its endowment as a waqf.

=== Ottoman period ===
During the reign of the Ottoman Sultan Murad III (1574-1596), Barbara's only mosque was built. It contained the tomb of Yusuf al-Barbarawi. In the 1596 tax registers, Barbara was part of the nahiya (subdistrict) of Gaza under the liwa' (district) of Gaza. It had a population of 73 Muslim households, an estimated 402 persons. They paid a fixed sum of 17,000 akçe in tax, where all the revenue went to a Muslim charitable endowment.

In 1838, Edward Robinson noted Barbara as a Muslim village, located in the Gaza district. In May 1863, the French explorer Victor Guérin visited the village. He estimated it had 400 inhabitants. He further noted a maqam (shrine) dedicated to Sheikh Yusuf, with sections of ancient white-grey marble columns. Further five -six sections of marble column were observed around the well. Socin found from an official Ottoman village list from about 1870 that Barbara had a total of 113 houses and a population of 372, though the population count included men only. Hartmann found that Barbara had 112 houses. In 1883 the PEF's Survey of Western Palestine described Barbara as a village rectangular in shape and surrounded by gardens and two ponds. The sand encroaching from the coast was stopped by the cactus hedges of the gardens. To the east of the village there were olive groves.

A building, dating to the late Ottoman, or early British Mandate era have been excavated. According to David Grossman, at least part of the village's residents had ancestral ties to Egypt.

=== British Mandate of Palestine ===
In the 1922 census of Palestine conducted by the British Mandate authorities, Barbara had a population of 1,369 inhabitants, all Muslims, which had increased in the 1931 census to 1546, still all Muslim, in 318 houses.

In the 1945 statistics the population of Barbara consisted of 2,410 Muslims and the land area was 13,978 dunams, according to an official land and population survey. Of this, 132 dunams were designated for citrus and bananas, 2,952 for plantations and irrigable land, 9,615 for cereals, while 70 dunams were built-up areas.

At the end of the Mandate Period, the above-mentioned mosque, built late 16th century, was still standing, and in addition the village center contained a number of shops. An elementary school was founded in 1921, and by 1947 it had 252 students. Barbara was also known for its long rugs, al-mazawid, which were woven by the women of the village.

=== 1948 War ===
Barbara was captured by a possible combination of the Negev, Giv'ati and Yiftach brigades on November 5, 1948, during Operation Yoav. At the end of November 1948, Coastal Plain District troops carried out sweeps of the villages around and to the south of Majdal. Barbara was one of the villages named in the orders to the IDF battalions and engineers platoon, that the villagers were to be expelled to Gaza, and the IDF troops were "to prevent their return by destroying their villages." The path leading to the village was to be mined. The IDF troops were ordered to carry out the operation "with determination, accuracy and energy". The operation took place on 30 November. The troops found "about 40" villagers in Barbara and al-Jiyya, "composed of women, old men and children", who offered no resistance. They were expelled to Beit Hanun, in the northern Gaza strip. Eight young men who were found were sent to a POW camp.

Following the war the area was incorporated into the State of Israel and the moshavim of Mavki'im and Talmei Yafeh were established on the former village's land. According to the Palestinian historian Walid Khalidi (1992), the village remaining structures on the village land are:

The crumbled walls and debris of houses are all that remains of the village buildings. The debris is overgrown with thorns and brush. Old eucalyptus and sycamore trees and cactuses also grow on the site. Some of the old streets are clearly identifiable. One area of the site serves as a garbage dump and a junkyard for old cars. The surrounding lands are planted by Israeli farmers in corn.

== Prominent inhabitants ==
- Kamal Adwan, PLO member
- Abdel Jabbar Adwan, writer

== See also ==
- Depopulated Palestinian locations in Israel

== Bibliography ==
- Barron, J.B., ed. (1923). Palestine: Report and General Abstracts of the Census of 1922. Government of Palestine.
- Conder, C.R.; Kitchener, H.H. (1883). The Survey of Western Palestine: Memoirs of the Topography, Orography, Hydrography, and Archaeology. Vol. 3. London: Committee of the Palestine Exploration Fund.
- Dauphin, C. (1998). La Palestine byzantine, Peuplement et Populations. BAR International Series 726 (in French). Vol. III : Catalogue. Oxford: Archeopress. ISBN 0-860549-05-4. (p. 876 )
- Department of Statistics (1945). Village Statistics, April, 1945. Government of Palestine.
- Guérin, V. (1869). Description Géographique Historique et Archéologique de la Palestine (in French). Vol. 1: Judee, pt. 2. Paris: L'Imprimerie Nationale.
- Hadawi, S. (1970). Village Statistics of 1945: A Classification of Land and Area ownership in Palestine. Palestine Liberation Organization Research Center.
- Haimi, Yoram (2 April 2008). "Mavqi'im Final Report" (120). Hadashot Arkheologiyot – Excavations and Surveys in Israel.
- Haimi, Yoram (15 November 2016). "Horbat Barbarit" (128). Hadashot Arkheologiyot – Excavations and Surveys in Israel.
- Hartmann, M. (1883). "Die Ortschaftenliste des Liwa Jerusalem in dem türkischen Staatskalender für Syrien auf das Jahr 1288 der Flucht (1871)". Zeitschrift des Deutschen Palästina-Vereins. 6: 102–149.
- Hütteroth, W.-D.; Abdulfattah, K. (1977). Historical Geography of Palestine, Transjordan and Southern Syria in the Late 16th Century. Erlanger Geographische Arbeiten, Sonderband 5. Erlangen, Germany: Vorstand der Fränkischen Geographischen Gesellschaft. ISBN 3-920405-41-2.
- Karmon, Y. (1960). "An Analysis of Jacotin's Map of Palestine" (PDF). Israel Exploration Journal. 10 (3, 4): 155–173, 244–253. Archived from the original (PDF) on 5 September 2018.
- Khalidi, W. (1992). All That Remains: The Palestinian Villages Occupied and Depopulated by Israel in 1948. Washington D.C.: Institute for Palestine Studies. ISBN 0-88728-224-5.
- Mills, E., ed. (1932). Census of Palestine 1931. Population of Villages, Towns and Administrative Areas. Jerusalem: Government of Palestine.
- Morris, B. (2004). The Birth of the Palestinian Refugee Problem Revisited. Cambridge University Press. ISBN 978-0-521-00967-6.
- Nikolsky, Vlada (17 February 2013). "Horbat Barbarit" (125). Hadashot Arkheologiyot – Excavations and Surveys in Israel.
- Palmer, E.H. (1881). The Survey of Western Palestine: Arabic and English Name Lists Collected During the Survey by Lieutenants Conder and Kitchener, R. E. Transliterated and Explained by E.H. Palmer. Committee of the Palestine Exploration Fund.
- Robinson, E.; Smith, E. (1841). Biblical Researches in Palestine, Mount Sinai and Arabia Petraea: A Journal of Travels in the year 1838. Vol. 3. Boston: Crocker & Brewster.
- Socin, A. (1879). "Alphabetisches Verzeichniss von Ortschaften des Paschalik Jerusalem". Zeitschrift des Deutschen Palästina-Vereins. 2: 135–163.
