= Nir Yisrael =

Moshav in southern Israel

Nir Yisrael: ניר ישראל (Hebrew)
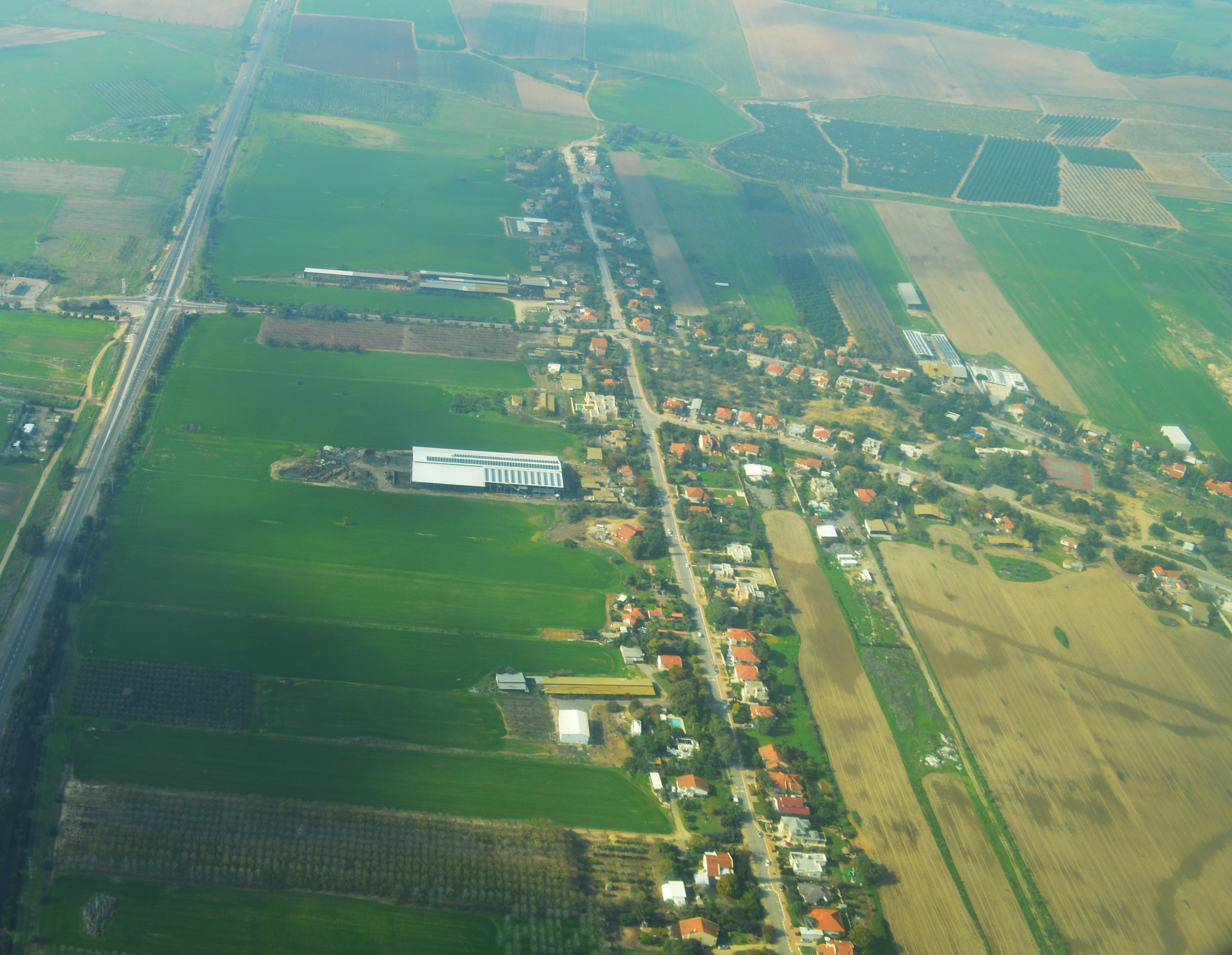

- Location within Ashkelon region of Israel
- Coordinates: 31°41′16″N 34°38′11″E
- Country: Israel
- District: Southern
- Subdistrict: Ashkelon
- Council: Hof Ashkelon
- Affiliation: HaOved HaTzioni
- Founded: 1949
- Founder: Czechoslovak and Hungarian Jewish immigrants
- Population (2024): 874

Nir Yisrael (Hebrew: נִיר יִשְׂרָאֵל, lit. 'Yisrael's Meadow') is a moshav in southern Israel. Located near Ashkelon, it falls under the jurisdiction of Hof Ashkelon Regional Council. In 2024 it had a population of 874.

== History ==
The moshav was founded in 1949 by Jewish immigrants from Czechoslovakia and Hungary who were members of the Jewish youth movement HaNoar HaTzioni. It was named after Yisrael Tiber, who donated large amounts of money to the Jewish National Fund.
