= Abdel Jabbar Adwan =

Palestinian writer and novelist

- Citizenship: Palestine
- Occupation: Author
- Writing career
- Language: Arabic

Abdel Jabbar Adwan is a Palestinian writer and novelist. He worked in the field of media and communications and used to write a weekly article in Al-Sharqul Awsat Newspaper. He also wrote a weekly article for the Daily Stars Lebanese newspaper. He was a consultant on Middle Eastern affairs during the First Palestinian Uprising (Intifada) for a number of European TV channels. He was one of the founders of the "Arab Organization for Human Rights," and he was elected twice for its presidency in the Britain branch.

== Published books ==
Adwan published three books: Anyabul Kharuf (The Sheep's Fangs), Ash-Shuhada' (The Martyrs), and Thamanul Istiqlal (The Price of Independence).

He was the author of several novels, including Siyasatun Fil Janna (Politics in Paradise), which was banned in some Arab countries, and it was nominated by Dar Al-Farabi publishing for the International Prize for Arabic Fiction – also known as the Poker Prize. His novel Rawi Córdoba (The Storyteller of Córdoba) got the tenth nomination in the International Prize for Arabic Fiction last year. His novel Bumat Barbara (The Owl of Barbara) - published by Dar Al-Farabi Publishing – is a novel based on real events talking about life in the author's village, the Palestinian village of Barbara, which was depopulated and destroyed during the Nakba. His fourth novel, published in 2013, Fitnatul Kursi (The Seduction of The chair), which was described by the author as "a novel whose events take place in the pre-Islamic and post-Islamic eras, and its geography spreads across the whole world." His fifth novel Ḥaffatul Nur (The Edge of Light), and it is a novel in three parts. The first part takes place during 5000 B.C. He also has a novel titled Shaʿabul Jabbarin (Strong People) where he discusses Arabic and Palestinian causes and issues, starting before the first Gulf War and America's occupation of Iraq during the second Gulf War, and their relation to the co-existing solution to the Palestinian Cause, resulting from the Oslo Accords and the events following that, especially 9/11.

- Asral Zaman (Prisoners of Time), Dar Al-Farabi Publishing, 2017.
- Bumat Barbara (The Owl of Barbara), Dar Al-Farabi Publishing, 296 pages, 2010.
- Siyasatun Fil Janna (Politics in Paradise), Dar Al-Farabi Publishing, 232 pages, 2008.
- Thamanul Istiqlal (The Price of Independence), Al-Sharqul Awsat Publishing, Cairo, 455 pages, 1989. Ḥaffatul Nur (The Edge of Light): A Trilogy, Dar Al-Farabi Publishing, 350 pages, 2015.
- Ḥaffatul Nur (The Edge of Light): A Trilogy, Dar Al-Farabi Publishing, 350 pages, 2015.
