= Nitzan =

Community in southern Israel

Nitzan: ניצן (Hebrew); نيتسان (Arabic)

Hebrew transcription(s)
  - Official: Nizzan
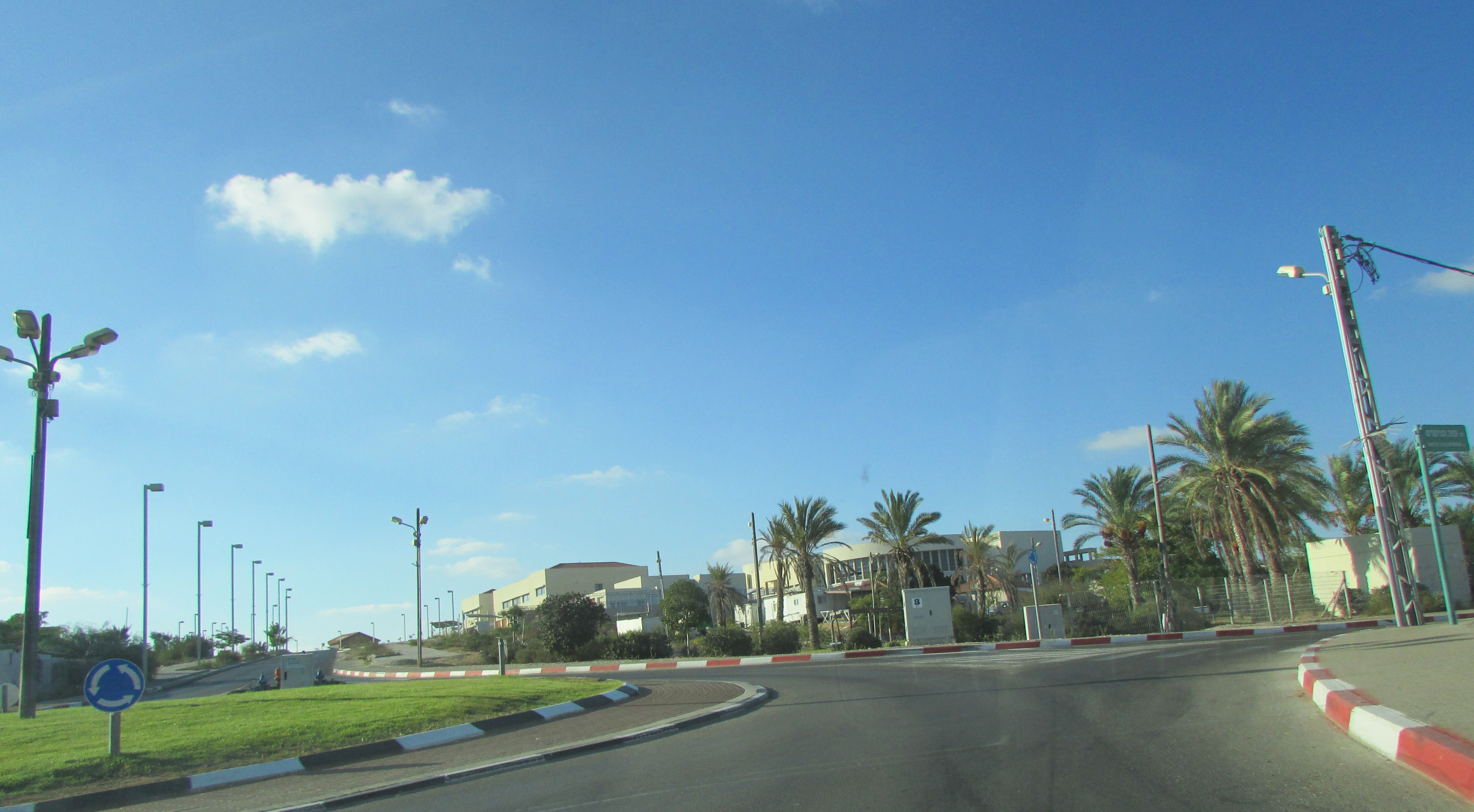

- Location within Ashkelon region of Israel
- Coordinates: 31°44′25″N 34°37′52″E
- Country: Israel
- District: Southern
- Subdistrict: Ashkelon
- Council: Hof Ashkelon
- Founded: 1949
- Population (2024): 2,634

Nitzan (Hebrew: ניצן, lit. Flower bud) is a religiously observant community settlement in southern Israel. Located within the Nitzanim Sand Dune Reserve north of Ashkelon, it falls under the jurisdiction of Hof Ashkelon Regional Council. In 2024 it had a population of 2,634, including a large concentration of Bnei Menashe (10–20% of the population) from India and Myanmar regions bordering India.

== History ==
=== Kibbutz Nitzanim ===
The first settlement on Nitzan's current grounds was the kibbutz of Nitzanim in 1943. The kibbutz was established after the Jewish National Fund purchased a 400-acre (1.6 km^{2}) plot of land and a large house known as the "mansion" in 1942. The first residents were immigrants, some of whom were Holocaust survivors. It later absorbed more immigrants from Poland and Romania. The kibbutz was conquered by Egypt during the 1948 Arab–Israeli War, but recaptured by Israel towards the end of the conflict. However, the kibbutz was re-established 3 kilometers (1.9 mi) to the south.

=== Nitzanim youth village ===
The original site became a youth village. It operated as Nitzanim Youth Village in 1949–1990.

=== Nitzan ===
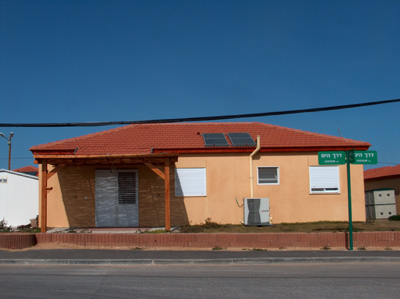
A typical caravilla in Nitzan

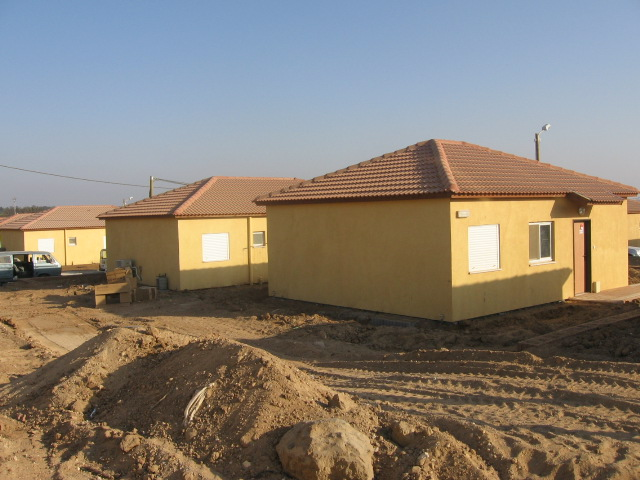
Caravillas in Nitzan, 2005

In 1990, the modern community settlement of Nitzan was established on the site of the youth village. By 1995 it had a population of 105. It experienced rapid expansion in the 2005 during the Israeli disengagement from Gaza after the town was selected to temporarily house a large group of families evacuated from Gush Katif, many of whom were Bnei Menashe immigrants. 500 temporary caravillas were constructed on the eastern end of Nitzan, which later became Nitzan Bet, and 250 more were ordered by the Israeli Government. These housing were meant to be temporary for two to three years, but many have lived in them for over a decade, leading to difficult living situations and the lack of social instability.

Several environmental organisations objected to the new construction, which increased Nitzan's area by four-and-a-half times. They feared damage to the fragile sand dune ecosystem. The neighbourhood was also the target of criticism by settlers and Israeli human-rights groups, citing a lack of adequate housing and facilities. They argued that governmental negligence resulted in a housing shortage, forcing large families to separate into multiple caravillas, and that basic infrastructure like a youth area, nursery, and synagogue were absent.

On 12 July 2012, the organization United With Israel delivered bomb shelters to the residents of Nitzan. It was a major event for the residents of Nitzan, whose children needed kindergarten bomb shelters. The event included children painting the shelters with murals, supervised by a professional mural artist.

== See also ==
- SPNI#Ecotourism: the old Arab "mansion" is the seat of the SPNI Shikmim Field School
