= Berekhya =

Moshav in southern Israel

Berekhya: ברכיה (Hebrew)
- Location within Ashkelon region of Israel
- Coordinates: 31°40′1″N 34°37′30″E
- Country: Israel
- District: Southern
- Subdistrict: Ashkelon
- Council: Hof Ashkelon
- Affiliation: Moshavim Movement
- Founded: 1950
- Founder: Tunisian Jews
- Population (2024): 1,308

Berekhya (Hebrew: בֶּרֶכְיָה) is a moshav in southern Israel. Located four kilometres east of Ashkelon, it falls under the jurisdiction of Hof Ashkelon Regional Council. In 2024 it had a population of 1,308.

== History ==
The moshav was founded in the winter of 1950 by immigrants from the Tunisian island of Djerba, who had formed a community whilst in a camp in Pardes Hana. Its name is an expression of the founders' wishes for the blessing (Hebrew: בְּרָכָה, Brakha) of God.
