= Mavki'im =

Moshav in southern Israel

Mavki'im: מבקיעים (Hebrew)
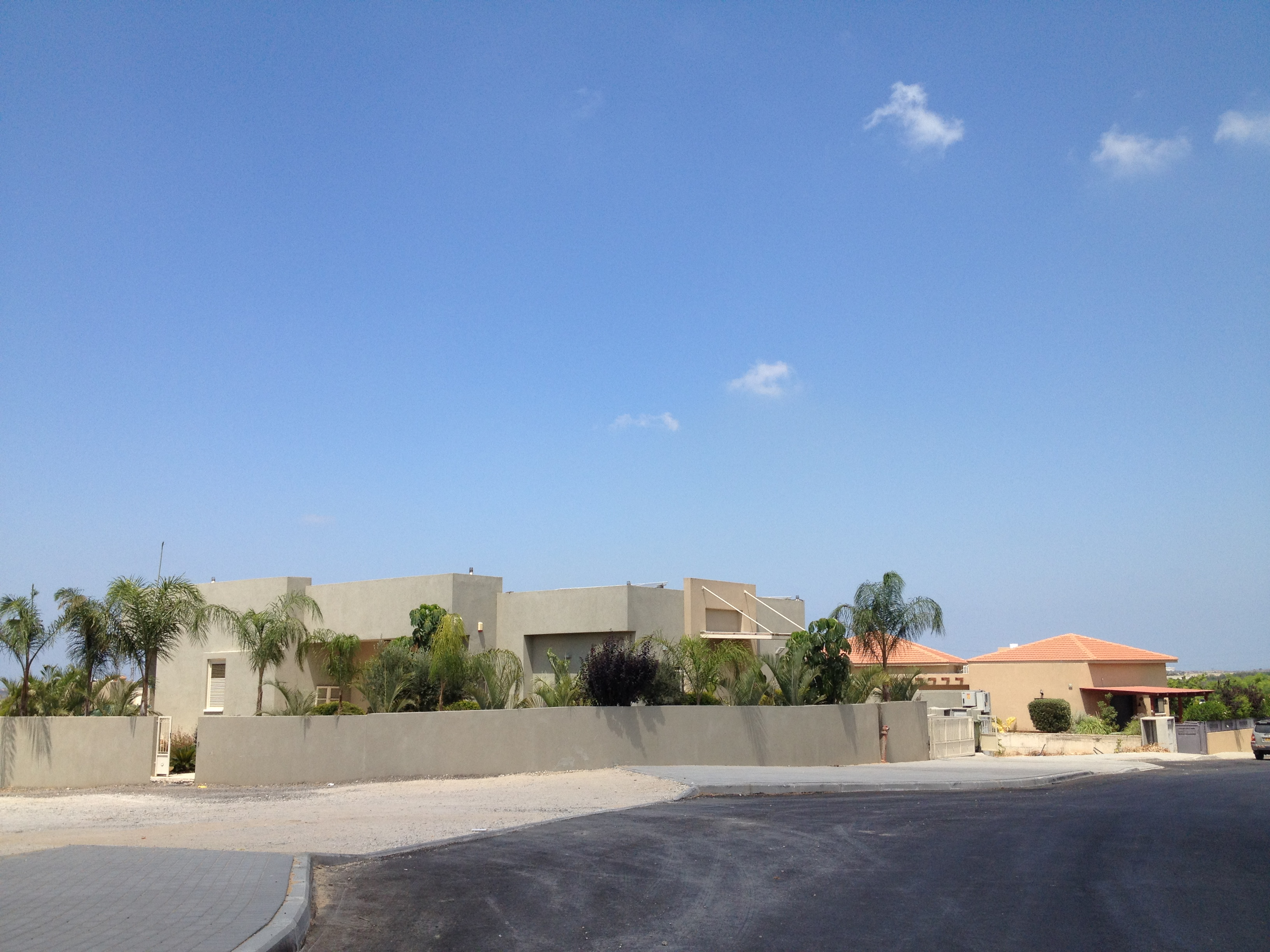

- Location within Ashkelon region of Israel
- Coordinates: 31°37′18″N 34°34′41″E
- Country: Israel
- District: Southern
- Subdistrict: Ashkelon
- Council: Hof Ashkelon
- Affiliation: HaOved HaTzioni
- Founded: 1949
- Founder: Demoblised IDF soldiers
- Population (2024): 526

Mavki'im (Hebrew: מַבְקִיעִים, lit. 'Breakthroughs') is a moshav in southern Israel. Located near Ashkelon, it falls under the jurisdiction of Hof Ashkelon Regional Council. In 2024 it had a population of 526.

== History ==
The moshav was founded in 1949 as a kibbutz by demobilised IDF soldiers who had immigrated from Hungary. It occupies the site of the former Palestinian village of Barbara. Barbara was to be included as part of the Arab state in the United Nations Partition Plan for Palestine, but it was depopulated after the Israel Defense Forces took the village from the Egyptian Army during the 1948 Arab–Israeli War. After the war the Israeli government forbade the Palestinian residents to return. In 1954 it was converted to a moshav shitufi. Its name refers to the IDF breakthrough against the Egyptian army in the area during the 1948 Arab–Israeli War.

In 2005 the moshav absorbed 25 families who were evacuated from Pe'at Sadeh as part of Israel's unilateral disengagement plan, which withdrew from settlements in the Gaza Strip considered illegal under international law.
