= Nitzanim =

Kibbutz in southern Israel

Nitzanim: נִצָּנִים, ניצנים (Hebrew)
- Location within Ashkelon region of Israel
- Coordinates: 31°43′3″N 34°38′8″E
- Country: Israel
- District: Southern
- Subdistrict: Ashkelon
- Council: Hof Ashkelon
- Affiliation: HaOved HaTzioni
- Founded: 1943
- Founder: Holocaust survivors
- Population (2024): 801
- Website: www.knitzanim.com

Nitzanim (Hebrew: נִצָּנִים, lit. 'Flower buds') is a kibbutz in southern Israel. Located between Ashkelon and Ashdod on the Nitzanim dunes, it falls under the jurisdiction of Hof Ashkelon Regional Council. In 2024 it had a population of 801.

== History ==
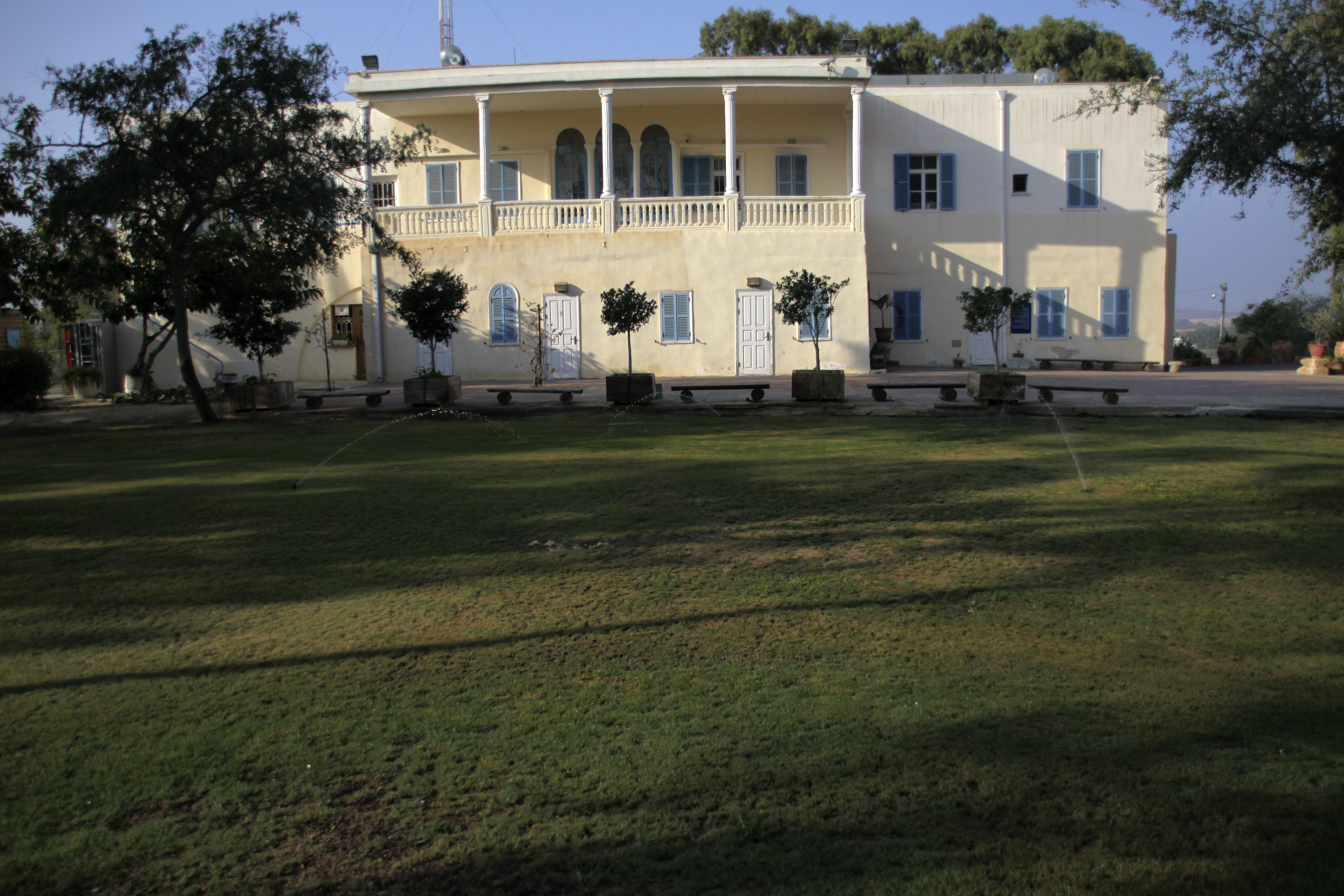
The old "mansion" at Nitzanim's initial location

Nitzanim was established on 8 December 1943 on a 400-acre plot of land purchased by the Jewish National Fund in 1942. On the grounds is a large building that became known as the "mansion." The first residents were new immigrants, some of them Holocaust survivors.

The kibbutz was bombarded and captured by the Egyptian army during the 1948 Arab–Israeli War in the Battle of Nitzanim. Of Nitzanim's 141 members, 37 were killed and many were taken prisoner.

Following the war, the kibbutz was moved four kilometres south of the original location, on the land of the depopulated Palestinian village of Hamama.

The original site of the kibbutz became Nitzanim Youth Village in 1949. After the youth village closed in 1990, the community settlement of Nitzan was founded there.

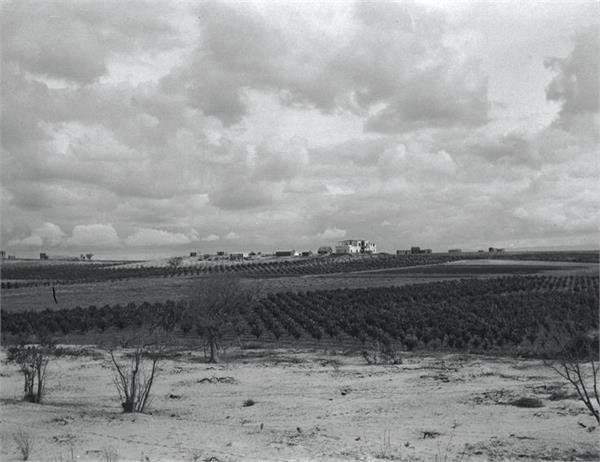
Nitzanim 1945

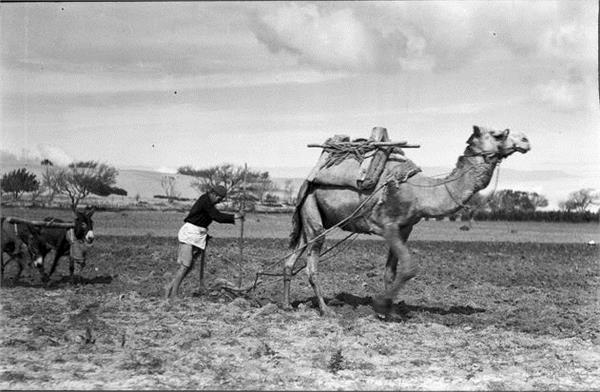
Nitzanim ploughing 1945

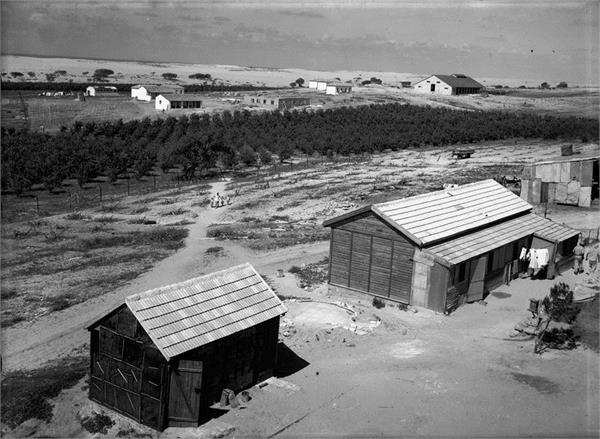
Nitzanim 1947

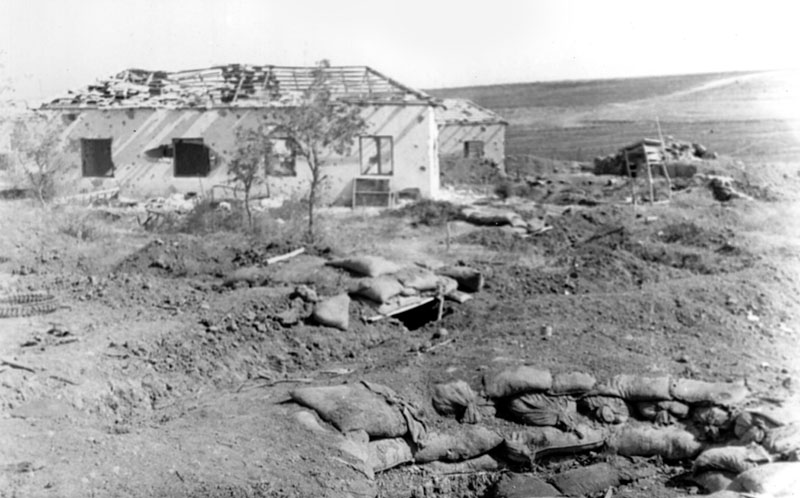
Homes in Nitzanim destroyed in the Arab–Israeli War

== See also ==
- Nizzanim culture, Neolithic culture named after the type-site at Nitzanim
