= Gvar'am =

Kibbutz in southern Israel

Gvar'am: גְּבַרְעָם (Hebrew)
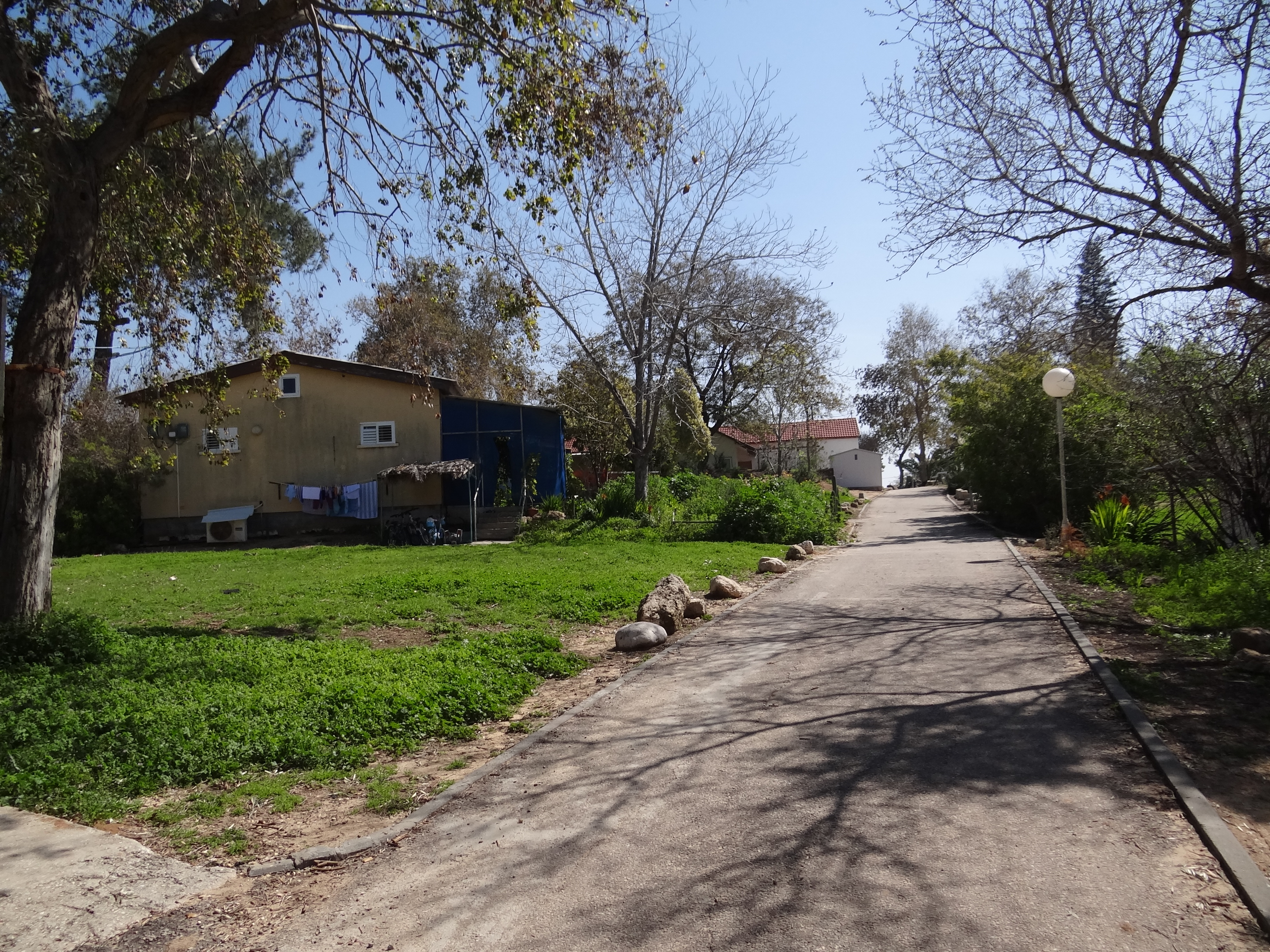

- Location within Ashkelon region of Israel
- Coordinates: 31°35′32″N 34°36′46″E
- Country: Israel
- District: Southern
- Subdistrict: Ashkelon
- Council: Hof Ashkelon
- Affiliation: Kibbutz Movement
- Founded: 1942
- Population (2024): 725
- Website: www.gevaram.org.il

Gvar'am (Hebrew: גְּבַרְעָם) is a kibbutz in southern Israel. Founded in 1942 and located around twelve kilometres from Ashkelon, it falls under the jurisdiction of Hof Ashkelon Regional Council. In 2024 it had a population of 725.

== Etymology ==
In early 1945 most of the kibbutz' residents asked to name the village "Masuot" (torches/beacons), while members of the Naming Committee of the existing fund proposed the name "Beit Hashkemah" (sycamore house). Eventually the name Gvar'am was chosen to symbolize the people's heroism in the struggle for the expansion of Israel's borders within its land. Some also pointed out the symbolic significance of the name as a response by the Jewish residency in the Land of Israel to the Holocaust.

== History ==
Kibbutz Gvar'am was established in 1942 on land owned by Jewish National Fund, which was located near the former Palestinian village of Simsim.

The core of the initial founders, called "Mahar", was established in Germany within the framework of the United Kibbutz as a common nucleus of both religious and secular members. Although the group initially included many religious members, over time, many secular individuals joined, and some of the religious members left. The group settled in the land of the existing foundation near Kfar Saba in 1935. In November 1938 a Sabbath desecration within the group sparked a protest from religious elements.

On 28 August 1942 a pilot group of core members arrived at the kibbutz's initial settlement point on a hill to the west of the current kibbutz location. The goal was to establish a strong foothold on approximately 3600 dunams of land belonging to the existing foundation, which had been acquired in the vicinity of the village of Simsim. These lands were scattered in over a hundred small plots. These plots included an orchard of about 80 dunams, located approximately one kilometer north of the settlement point, and it had a water well that served the kibbutz.

Initially, the temporary settlement point was occupied by around 30 people. Shacks were built, serving as a dining room, laundry, infirmary, dining hall, and prayer area. Tents were also set up for living quarters. In October 1942, two kibbutz members were injured when their tractor hit an old landmine. Most of the kibbutz members continued to live near Kfar Saba. In 1945 the kibbutz was moved to its permanent location.

During the Independence War, the kibbutz was on the front lines facing the invading Egyptian forces and came under direct fire from the Hulikat battleground. As a result, the kibbutz's children and women sought refuge in Jaffa.

In the early years of the state, during the first decade, the kibbutz faced financial difficulties and accrued debts.

On 19 July 2013 a temporary synagogue was opened in Gvar'am, initially located in one of the shelters. After about four months, its location was moved to a building that had served for many years as a "clothing warehouse" and underwent renovations. In 2014 the kibbutz began a process of expansion and the integration of new families.

It has been targeted by Hamas rockets for many years. In 2008 a rocket killed a resident of the kibbutz, who was the mother-in-law of English actor Paul Kaye (who had lived there for a year and met his wife there).
