= Caravan (Israel) =

Israeli term referring to a portable building

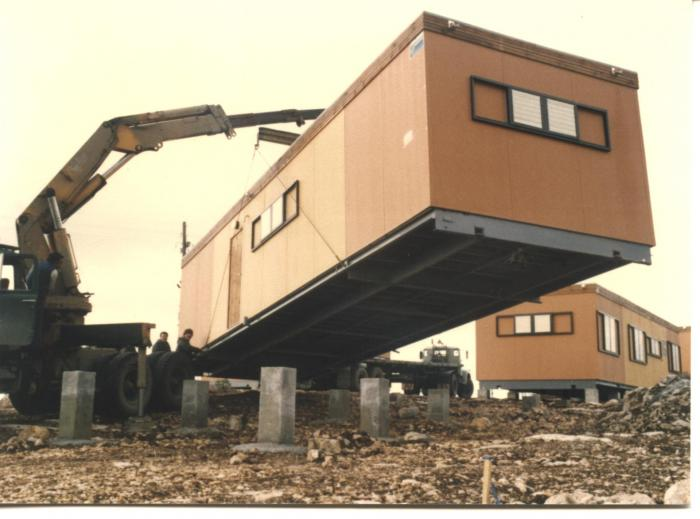
Posting of caravan in Mitzpe Hila, Israel, 1982

In Israel, portable buildings are called caravans (Hebrew: קרוואן; pl. קרוואנים, caravanim). They may be used as a living space, often temporary, school classroom, synagogue, or community center.

Campervans, RVs, and camper trailers may also be referred to as "caravans" in Israel.

== Description ==
Caravanim are constructed of aluminum or other metal siding with a corrugated metal roof, and are often attached to a cement-block base. They are not insulated but can be outfitted with heating and air-conditioning units, water lines, recessed lighting, and floor tiling to function in a full-service capacity.

== Classrooms ==
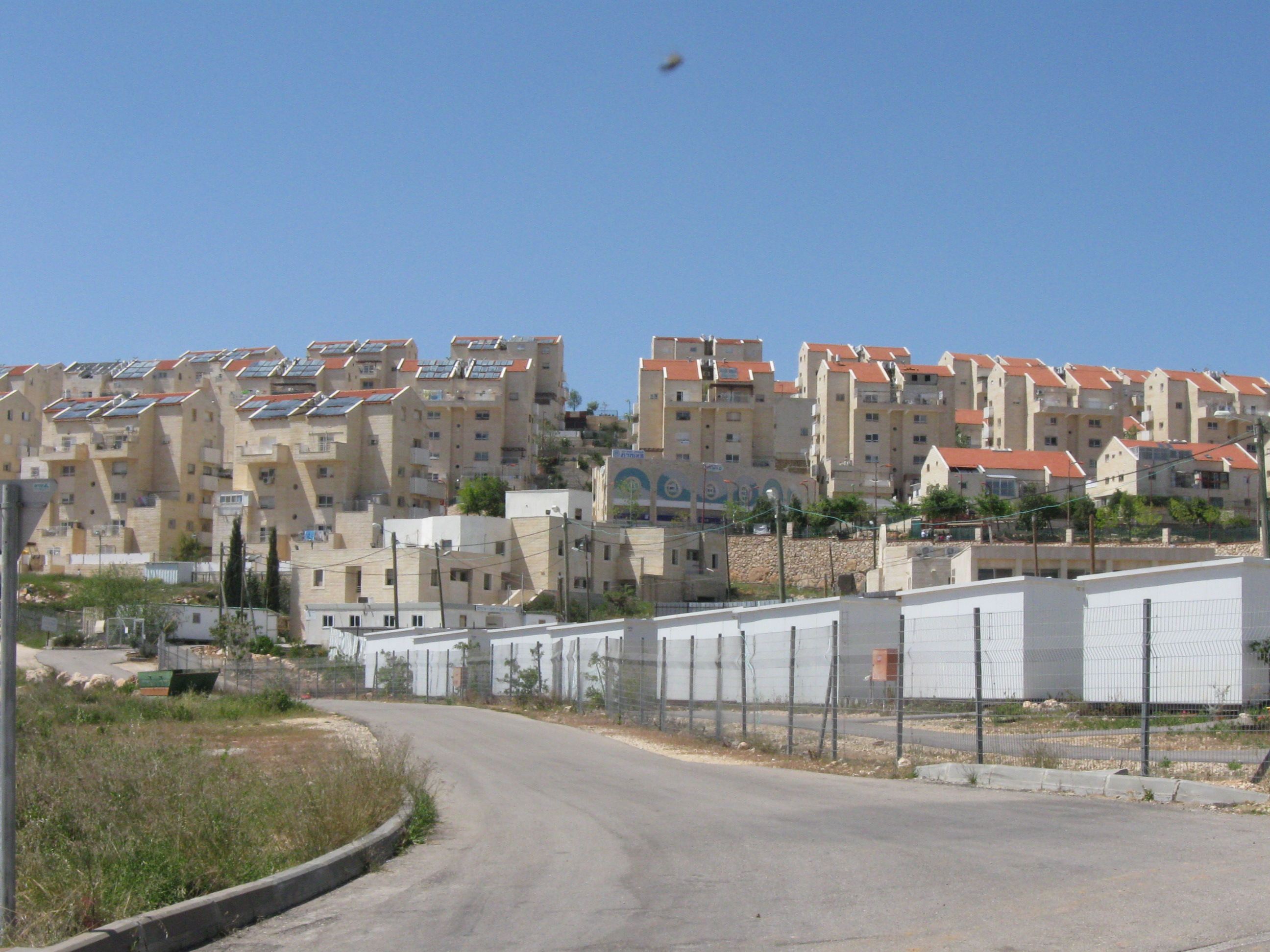
School in caravanim (lower right) on the perimeter of Tel Zion, a Haredi settlement in the West Bank.

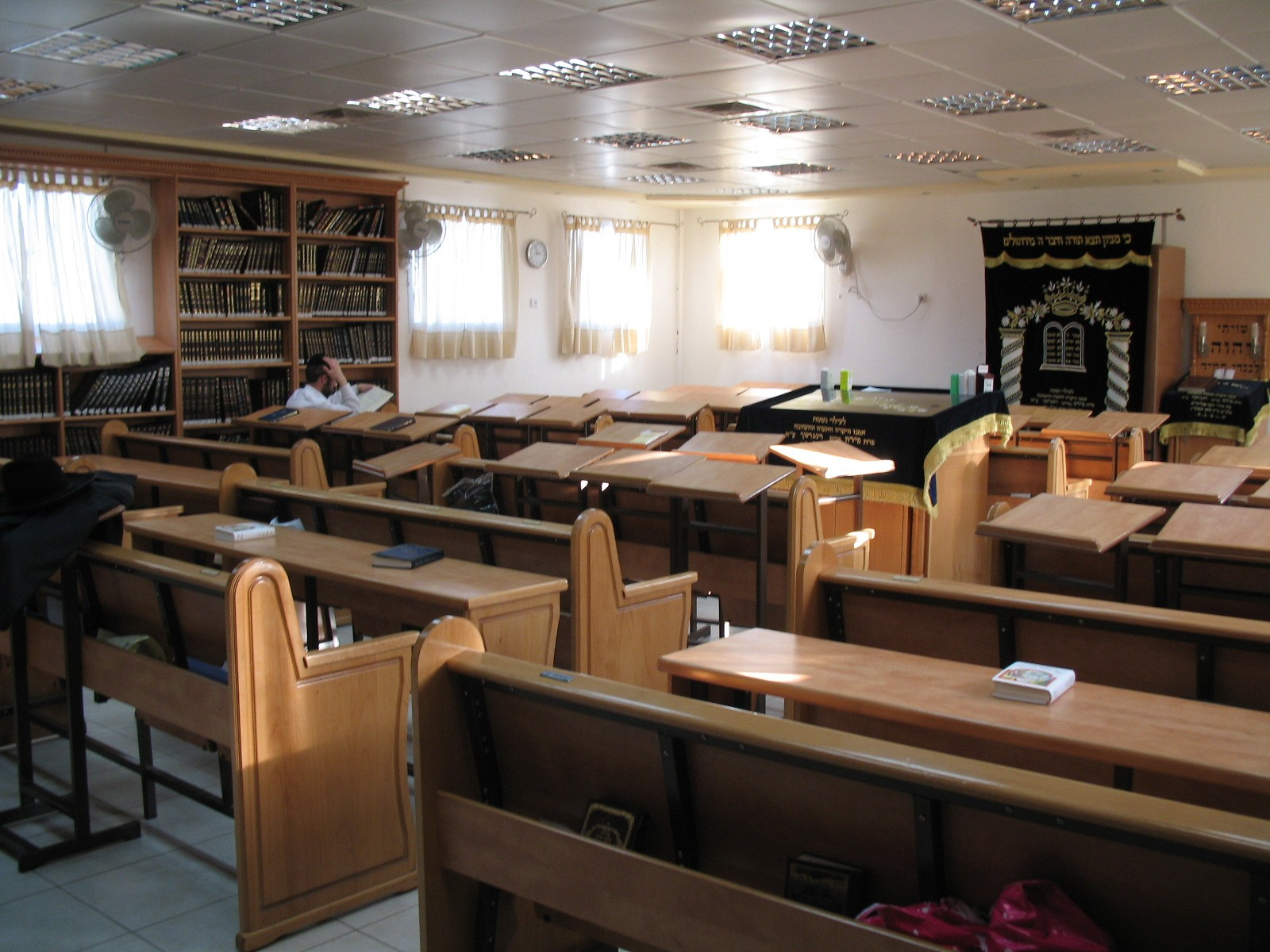
Interior of a synagogue housed in a caravan in Neve Yaakov, Jerusalem.

Caravanim are popularly employed by schools — especially in Haredi neighborhoods of Israel — that are unable to finance a permanent structure. A 2008 report by the State Comptroller of Israel reported that 125 out of 186 Haredi schools in Bnei Brak, Elad and Modi'in Illit were situated wholly or partially in caravanim, some older than 15 years. The report criticized these structures for lack of ventilation, lack of bomb shelters, and lack of proper yards or playgrounds for the children. Though the construction of some caravan schools violate local planning and building laws, the government does not dismantle them.

== Synagogues ==
Many start-up religious congregations establish their synagogues in caravanim rather than the more expensive permanent concrete-and-stone structures. Synagogues housed in caravanim are common sights at Israel army bases.

== Living space ==
Caravanim are sometimes used as inexpensive houses in new or extensions of existing localities within Israel.

=== Massive immigration ===
The massive influx of immigrants from the former Soviet Union and Ethiopia that increased the population of Israel by about 10% occurred during a short period time in early 1990s. It was handled by the emergency assembly of whole caravan sites (akin to mobile home parks), similar to ma'abarot of 1950s. They were envisioned as short-time temporary solutions, for about 5 years, but they existed for a much longer time.

The largest of these was the Nahal Beka suburb of Beersheba with about 2,300 caravans. By 1995 the caravan site was vacated.

=== Settler housing ===
Most often, caravanim are employed by both settlers and the government as housing in Israeli settlement areas in the territories occupied since 1967. Residents usually live in caravanim until permanent homes are built. The caravan may also be a more permanent low-rent option, particularly for young couples.

The overnight installment of caravanim for housing is a popular means of establishing a new, unauthorized settler outpost on disputed land.

Caravanim have been established on disputed land both by Israeli and Palestinian activists as a sign of protest.

=== Caravillas ===
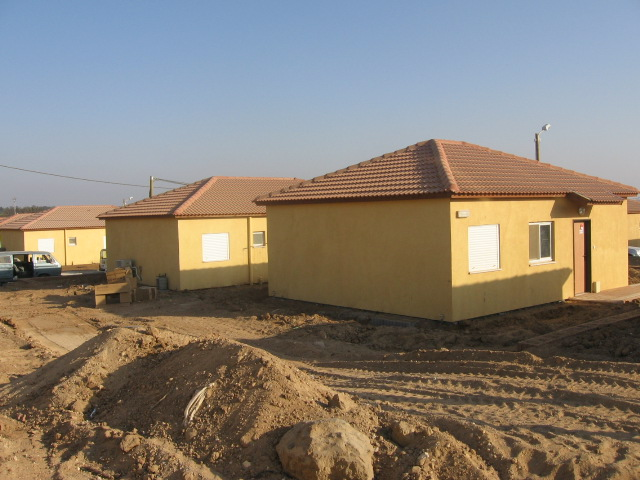
Vacant caravillas in Nitzan, 2005

In 2005 prefabricated homes, named caravillas (Hebrew: קרווילה), a portmanteau of the words caravan and villa, were set up to house the Jewish families evicted from their homes in Gush Katif in the Gaza Strip as part of Israel's unilateral disengagement plan.

A caravilla is composed of several prefabricated sections that are joined on a foundation. Caravillas, which vary in size from about 650 to 1,000 square feet, are akin to the Israeli concept of a villa, or single-family home. They were instrumental in pacifying objections to the disengagement plan. The biggest of these caravilla camps was established in Nitzan, north of Ashkelon with 250 caravillas, which has grown to accommodate over 500.

== See also ==
- Mobile home
