= Hof Ashkelon Regional Council =

Coordinates: 31.717°N 34.633°E

Hof Ashkelon חוף אשקלון حوف عسقلان
- Regional council (from 1950)
- Interactive map of Hof Ashkelon
- Country: Israel
- District: Southern
- Subdistrict: Ashkelon
- Natural region: Ashkelon

Government
  - Head of Municipality: Itamar Revivo

Area
  - Total: 175,310 dunams (175.31 km^{2}; 67.69 sq mi)
- Elevation: 54 m (177 ft)

Population (2024)
  - Total: 20,875
  - Density: 119.07/km^{2} (308.40/sq mi)
- Website: Official website

Hof Ashkelon Regional Council (Hebrew: מועצה אזורית חוף אשקלון, Mo'atza Azorit Hof Ashkelon, lit. Ashkelon Coast Regional Council) is a regional council in the Southern District of Israel. As of the year 2024, its population is around 21,000.

The council is bordered to the north by Be'er Tuvia Regional Council, to the east by the Be'er Tuvia, Lakhish, Shafir and Yoav Regional Councils, to the south by Sha'ar HaNegev Regional Council and the Gaza Strip, and to the west by Ashkelon and the Mediterranean Sea. Its average elevation is 54 meters above the sea level.

== List of communities ==
The council covers 19 communities, including five kibbutzim, eleven moshavim, two community settlements and a youth village.

Kibbutzim

- Gevaram
- Karmia
- Nitzanim
- Yad Mordechai
- Zikim

Moshavim

- Beit Shikma
- Berekhya
- Ge'a
- Heletz
- Hodiya
- Kokhav Michael
- Mashen
- Mavki'im
- Nir Yisrael
- Netiv HaAsara
- Talmei Yafeh

Community settlements

- Bat Hadar
- Be'er Ganim
- Nitzan
- Nitzan Bet

Youth villages

- Kfar Silver
- Nitzanim Youth Village (closed)

== Demographics ==
Historical population
Year	Pop.	±%
1972	5,800	—
1983	6,000	+3.4%
1995	6,400	+6.7%
2008	12,530	+95.8%
2022	20,100	+60.4%
2024	20,875	+3.9%

== Voting Patterns ==
In the 2022 election, 58 percent of voters in the regional council voted for the parties of the right-wing coalition led by Benjamin Netanyahu, while 42 percent voted for the parties of the center-left coalition led by Yair Lapid and 0.2 percent voted for the Arab parties.

In the 2026 election, 52 percent of voters in the regional council voted for the parties of the right-wing coalition led by Benjamin Netanyahu, while 40 percent voted for the parties of the center-left coalition led by Gadi Eisenkot and 0.1 percent voted for the Arab parties. An additional 3.9 percent voted for the Reservists, and 2.9 percent voted for Amcha Yisrael. Voter turnout increased 12 percent from the 2022 election.
