= Be'er Ganim =

Be'er Ganim: באר גנים (Hebrew)
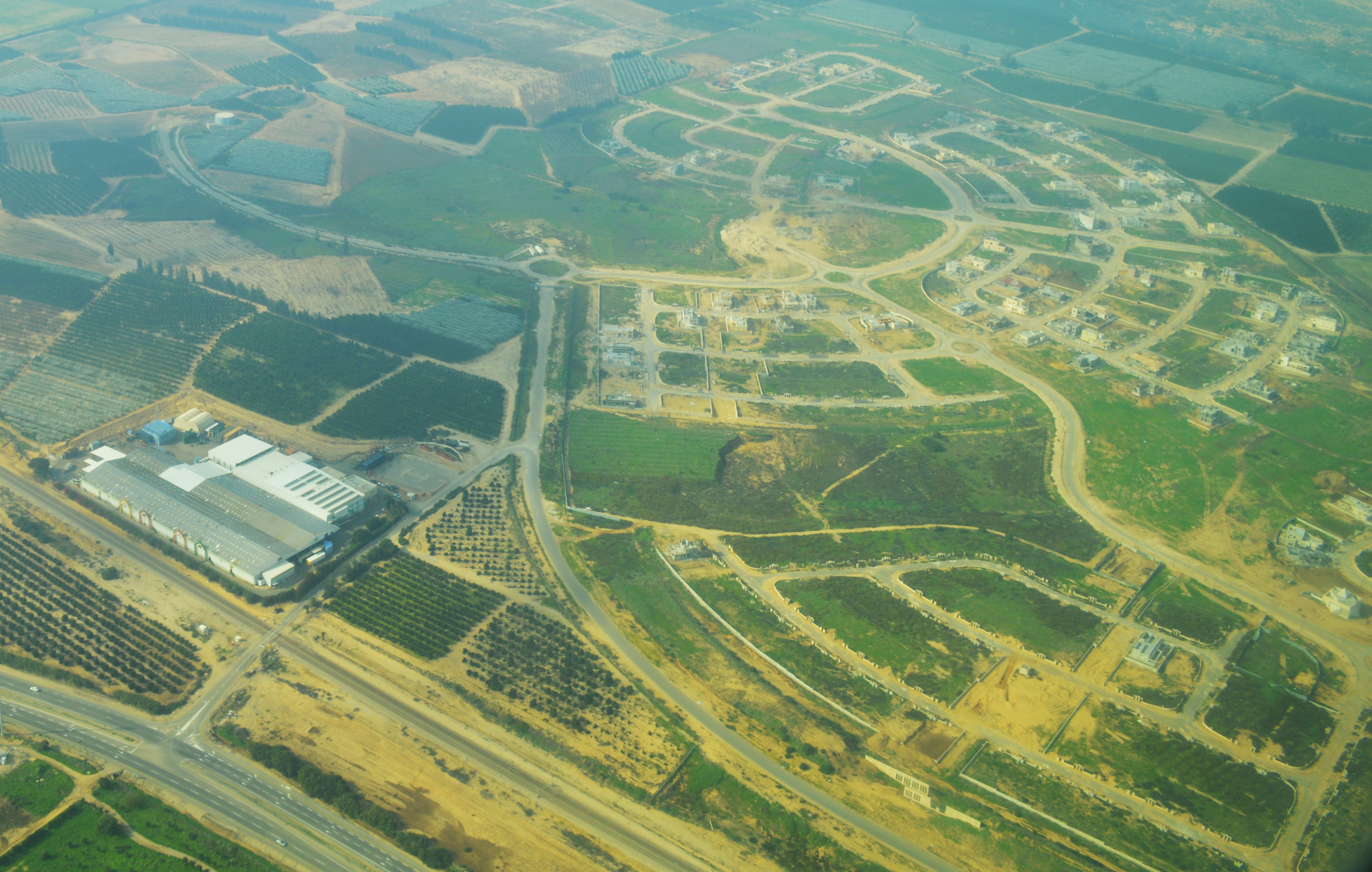
- Be'er Ganim from the air

- Location within Ashkelon region of Israel Location within Israel
- Coordinates: 31°42′01″N 34°36′28″E
- Country: Israel
- District: Southern
- Subdistrict: Ashkelon
- Council: Hof Ashkelon
- Founded: 2012
- Founder: Former settlers
- Population (2024): 2,890
- Website: www.beerganim.co.il

Be'er Ganim (Hebrew: באר גנים, lit. 'Gardens Well') is a community settlement in southern Israel. It falls under the jurisdiction of Hof Ashkelon Regional Council and had a population of 2,890 in 2024.

== History ==
The village was established in 2012 in order to house former settlers who had been evacuated from the Gaza Strip.
