= Mash'en =

Moshav in southern Israel

Mash'en: משען (Hebrew)
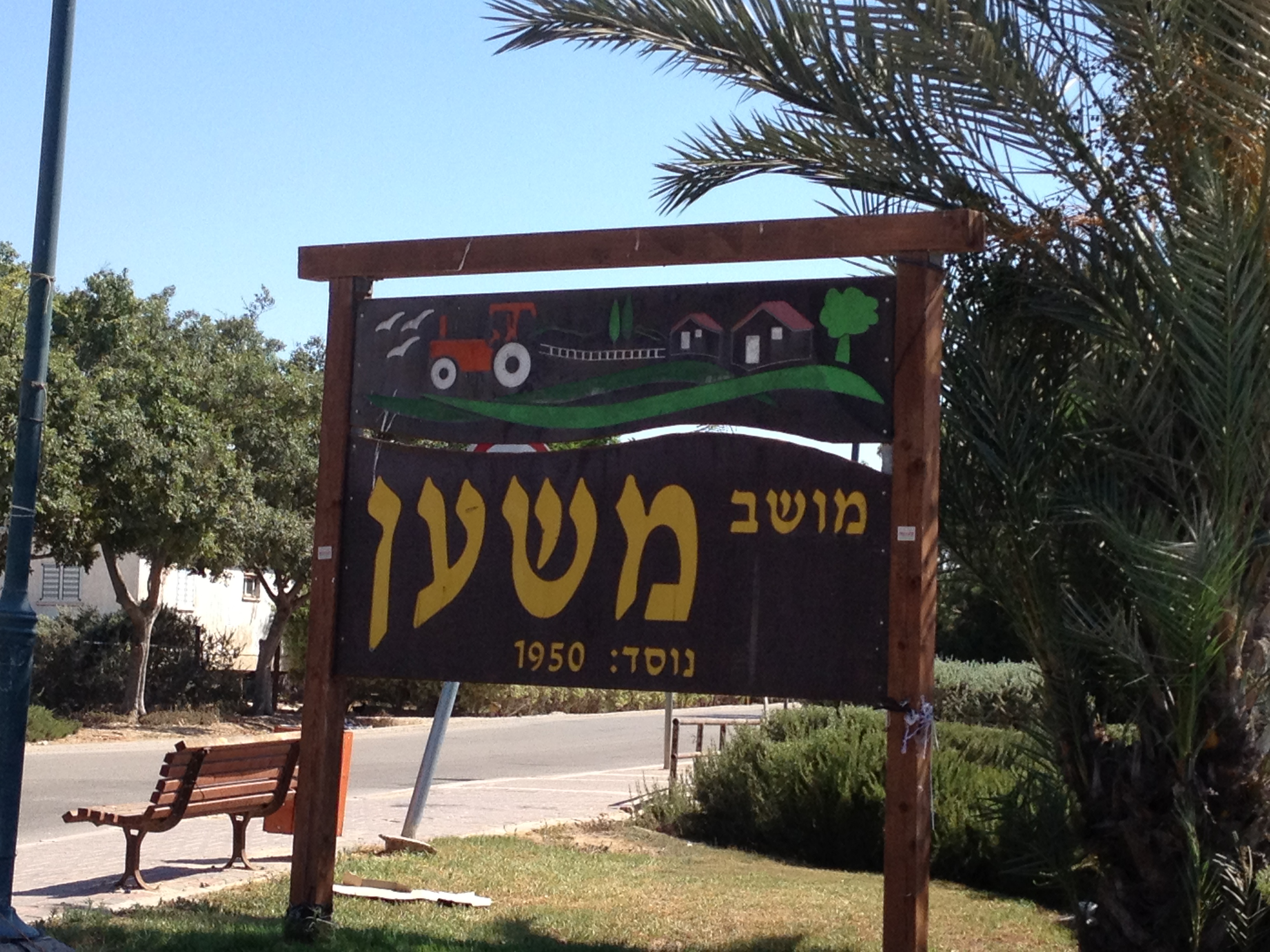

- Location within Ashkelon region of Israel
- Coordinates: 31°39′26″N 34°37′24″E
- Country: Israel
- District: Southern
- Subdistrict: Ashkelon
- Council: Hof Ashkelon
- Affiliation: Moshavim Movement
- Founded: 1949
- Founder: Yemenite immigrants
- Population (2024): 946
- Website: http://mashen.net

Mash'en (Hebrew: מַשְׁעֵן, lit. 'Staff') is a moshav in southern Israel. Located near Ashkelon, it falls under the jurisdiction of Hof Ashkelon Regional Council. In 2024 it had a population of 946.

== History ==
The moshav was founded in 1949 by immigrants from Yemen. The name is taken from Isaiah 3:1.
