= Kokhav Michael =

Moshav in southern Israel

Kokhav Michael: כוכב מיכאל (Hebrew); كوخاف ميخائيل (Arabic)
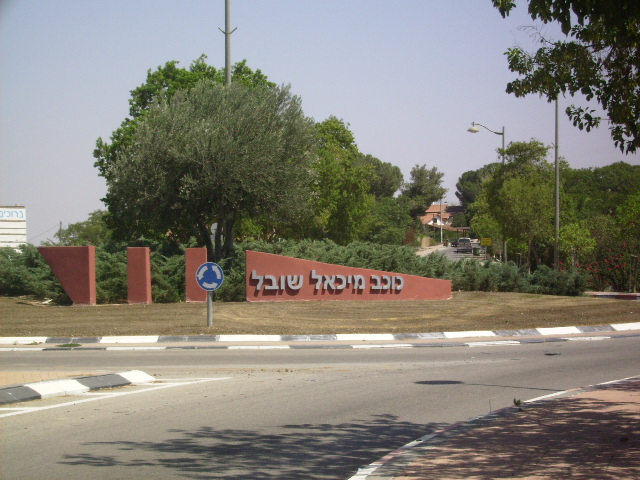
- Entrance to Kokhav Michael

- Location within Ashkelon region of Israel
- Coordinates: 31°37′44″N 34°40′10″E
- Country: Israel
- District: Southern
- Subdistrict: Ashkelon
- Council: Hof Ashkelon
- Affiliation: Moshavim Movement
- Founded: 1950
- Founder: Iraqi immigrants
- Population (2024): 1,113

Kokhav Michael (Hebrew: כּוֹכַב מִיכָאֵל, lit. Star of Michael) is a moshav in southern Israel. Located between Kiryat Gat and Ashkelon, it falls under the jurisdiction of Hof Ashkelon Regional Council. In 2024 it had a population of 1,113.

== History ==
The moshav was founded in 1950 by immigrants from Iraq, on the lands of the depopulated Palestinian village of Kawkaba (from which the moshav takes the first part of its name; the second half is from Michael Sobell, a British philanthropist). They were joined by immigrants from Argentina in 1962.
