= Bat Hadar =

Community settlement in southern Israel

Bat Hadar: בת הדר (Hebrew); بات هدار (Arabic)
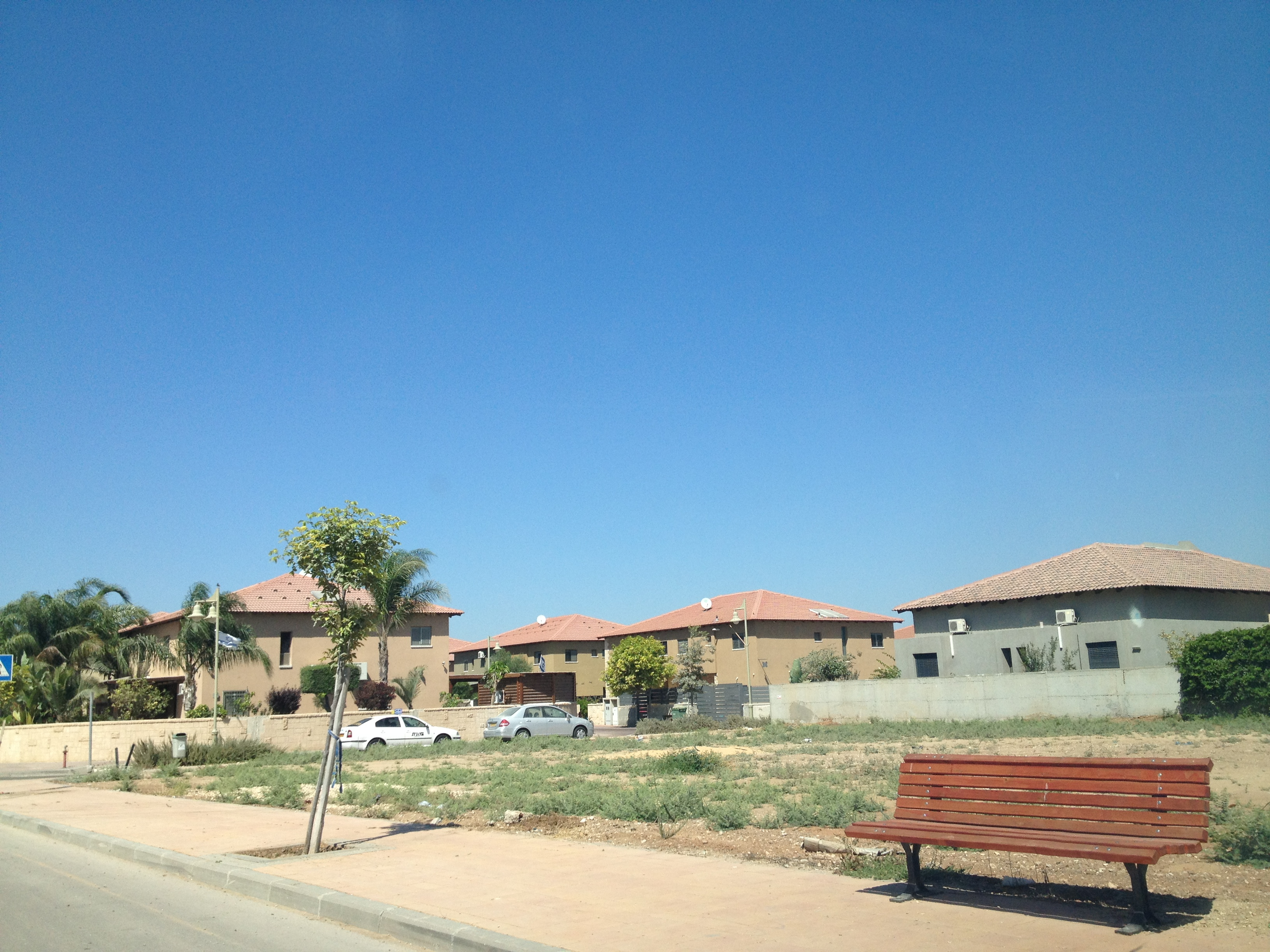

- Location within Ashkelon region of Israel
- Coordinates: 31°38′51″N 34°35′47″E
- Country: Israel
- District: Southern
- Subdistrict: Ashkelon
- Council: Hof Ashkelon
- Founded: 1994
- Founder: Regional Council
- Population (2024): 643

Bat Hadar (Hebrew: בַּת הָדָר, lit. Daughter of Citrus) is a community settlement in southern Israel. Located near Ashkelon, it falls under the jurisdiction of Hof Ashkelon Regional Council. In 2024 it had a population of 643.

== History ==
The village was founded in 1994 by the regional council. Its name is derived from the Hadaria farm on whose land it was established.
