= Heletz =

Moshav in southern Israel

Heletz: חלץ (Hebrew)
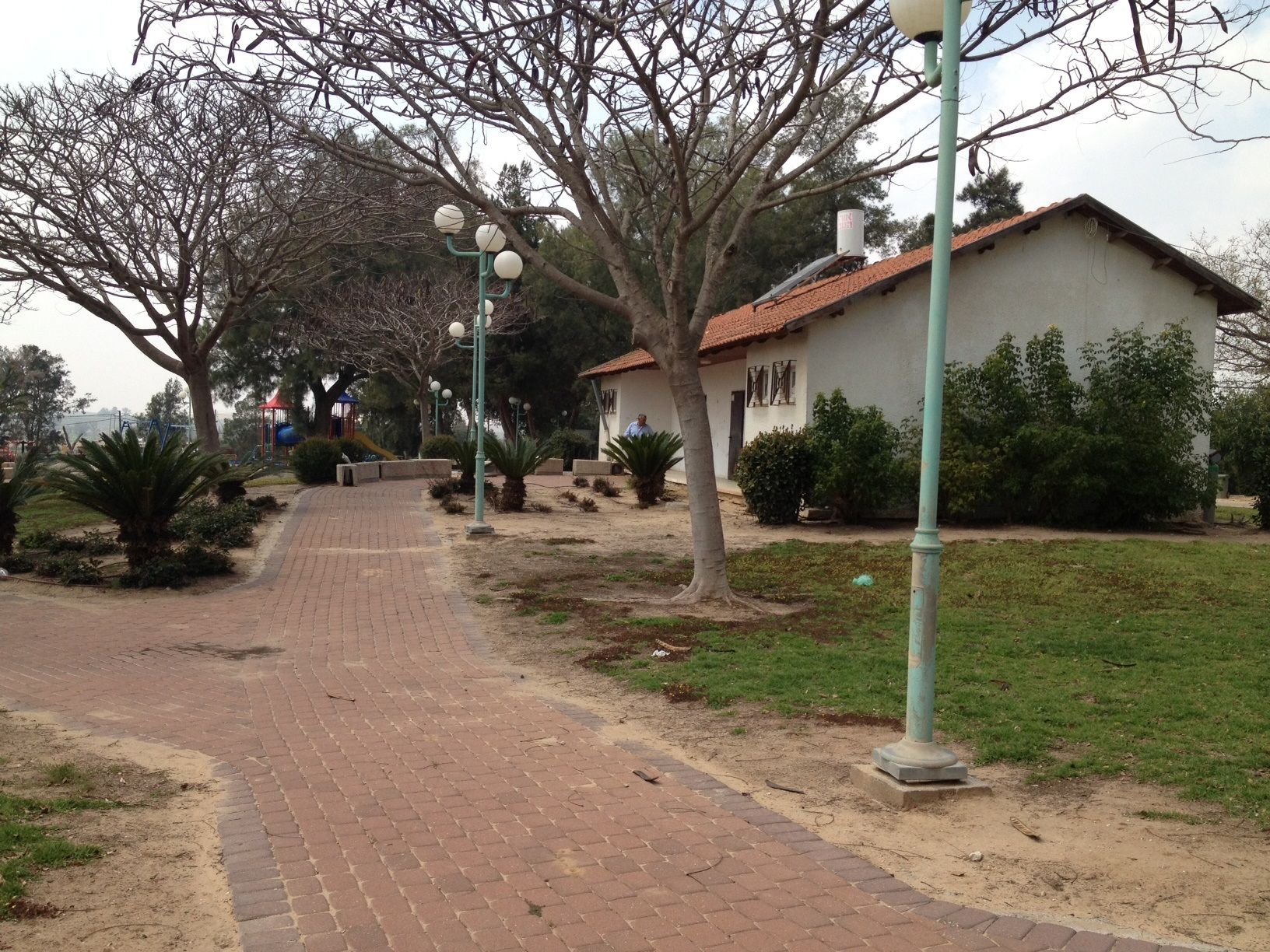

- Location within Ashkelon region of Israel
- Coordinates: 31°34′41″N 34°39′29″E
- Country: Israel
- District: Southern
- Subdistrict: Ashkelon
- Council: Hof Ashkelon
- Affiliation: Moshavim Movement
- Founded: 1950
- Founder: Yemenite immigrants
- Population (2024): 639

Heletz oilfield in 1955

Heletz (Hebrew: חֶלֶץ) is a moshav in southern Israel. Located between Ashkelon, Kiryat Gat and Sderot, it falls under the jurisdiction of Hof Ashkelon Regional Council. In 2024 it had a population of 639.

== History ==
The moshav was founded in 1950 by immigrants from Yemen, and was named after the Biblical Helez, one of King David's Warriors (2 Samuel 23:26).

It was founded on the land of the depopulated Palestinian village of Burayr.

== Economy ==
The Heletz oil field was the location of the first successful oil well in the country, with extraction beginning in 1955 resulting in much celebration. It remains the most economic oil field in Israel.

Recently Avenue Group, Inc. and Tomco Energy have restarted production from the Heletz oil field. The companies reported total production of over 3,200 barrels (510 m^{3}) of oil since June 11. Three more wells are currently awaiting the delivery and installation of downhole pumps in preparation for their return to production. The companies have also retained the international consultant firm of TRACS International to study the oil and gas reserves underlying the Heletz field. Reserves are estimated at 20 million barrels (3.2×10^{6} m^{3}) of oil to as high as 100 million barrels (16×10^{6} m^{3}).

Tomco Energy had its shares suspended on 11 February 2009 stating contractual difficulties relating to the financing of its Heletz oil field operations.
