= Kfar Silver =

Youth village in southern Israel

Kfar Silver: כפר סילבר (Hebrew)
- Location within Ashkelon region of Israel
- Coordinates: 31°40′25″N 34°36′42″E
- Country: Israel
- District: Southern
- Subdistrict: Ashkelon
- Council: Hof Ashkelon
- Affiliation: Moshavim Movement
- Founded: 1957
- Founder: Zionist Organization of America
- Population (2024): 253

Kfar Silver (Hebrew: כְּפַר סִילְבֶר, lit. 'Silver Village') is a youth village in southern Israel. Located near Ashkelon, the village falls under the jurisdiction of Hof Ashkelon Regional Council. In 2024 it had a population of 253.

== History ==
The village was founded in 1957 on the initiative of the Zionist Organization of America, and was named after Abba Hillel Silver. In March 2008 it was hit by a BM-21 fired from the Gaza Strip. Kfar Silver operates as a boarding school. The founder and first principal of the school was author and educator Aryeh Kotzer.

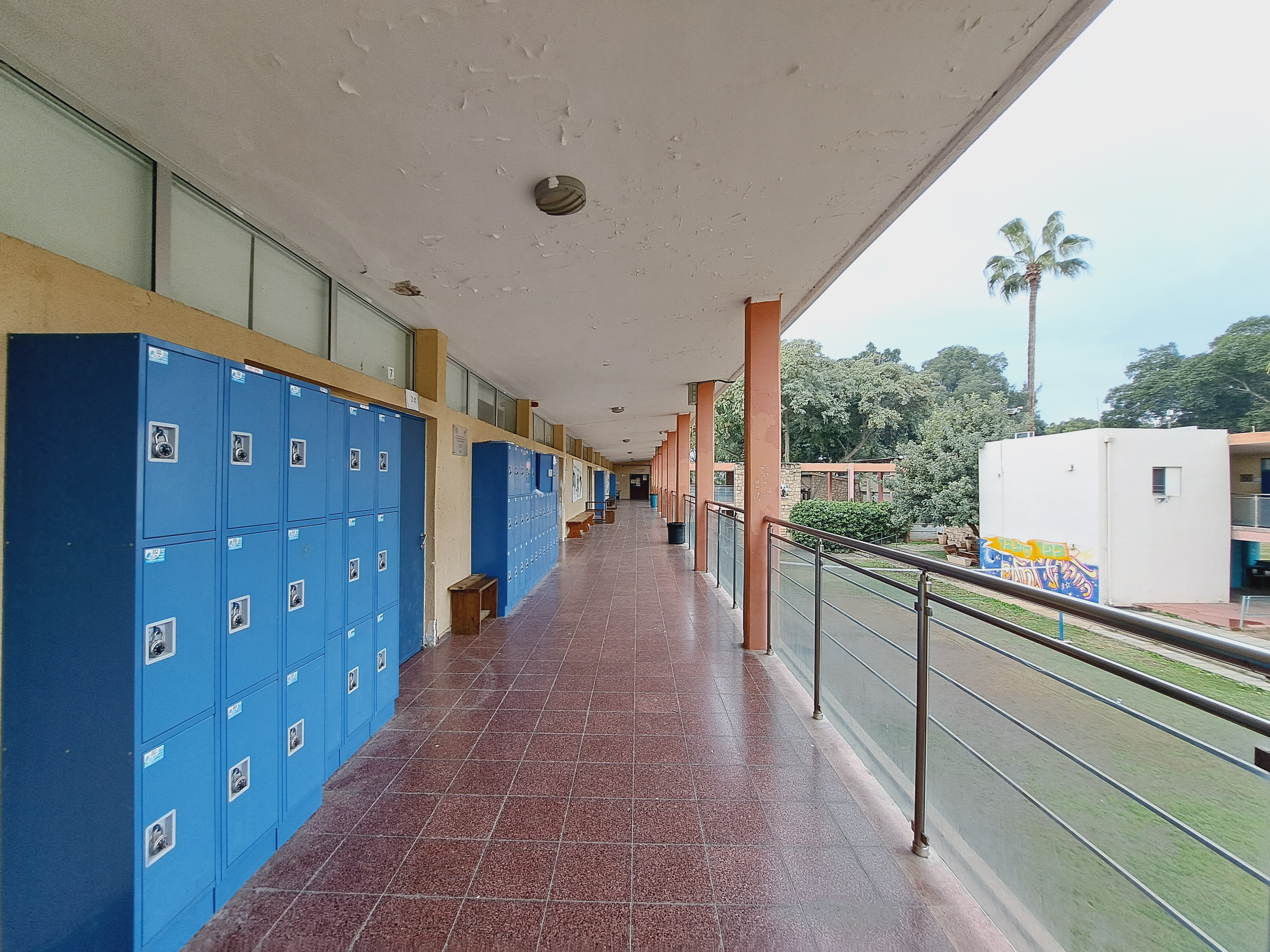
classroom building

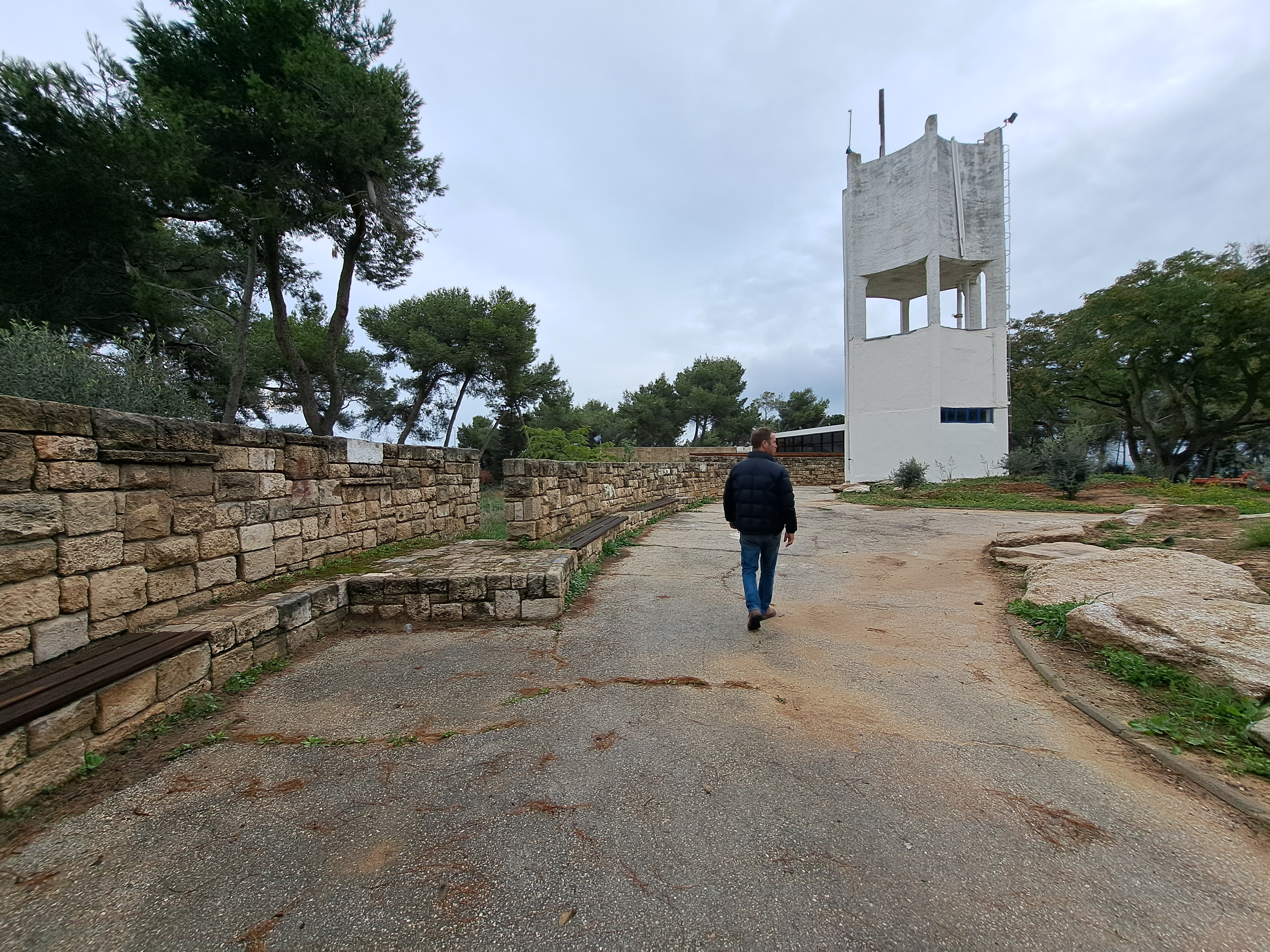
Water tower

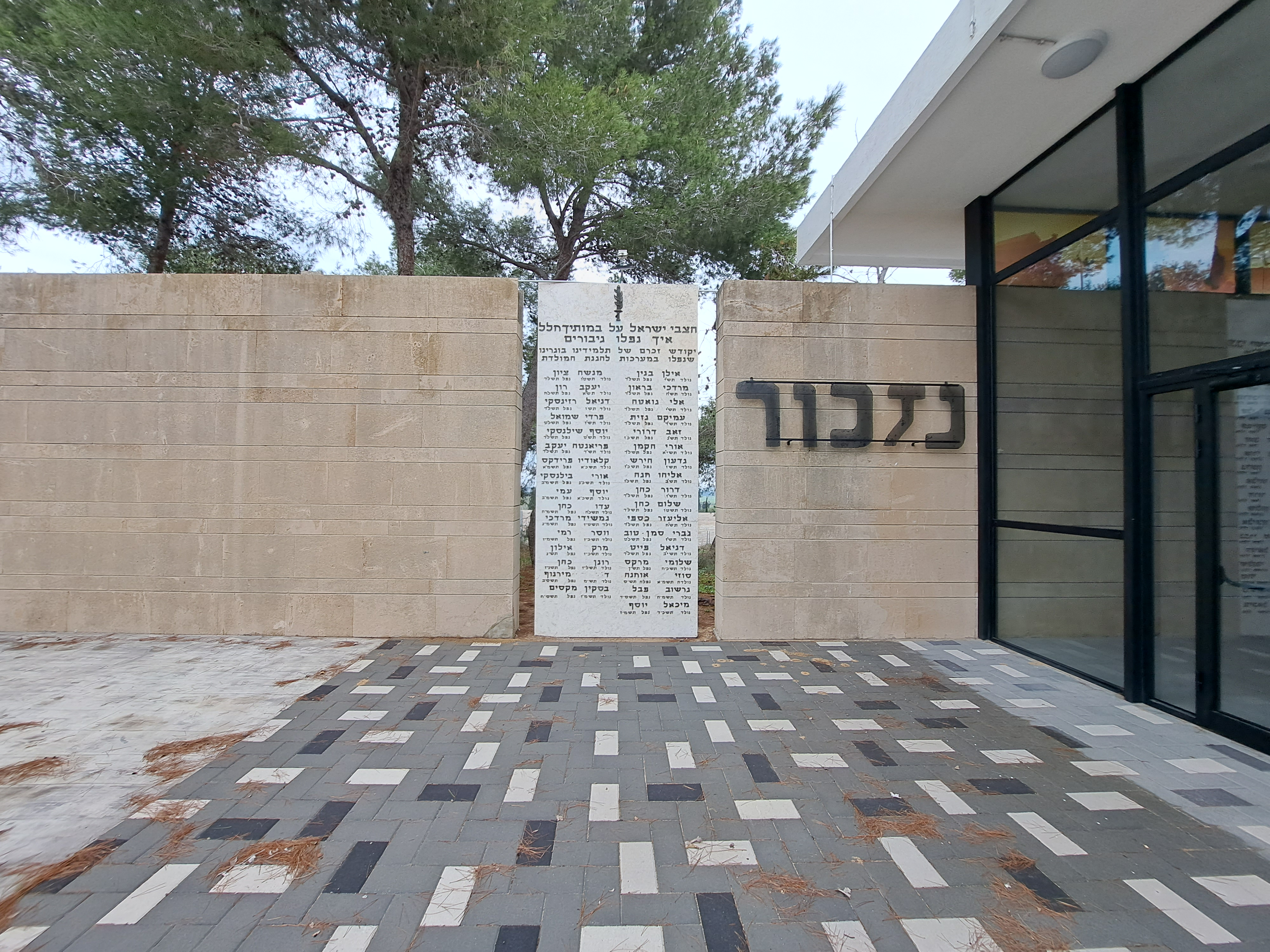
A memorial site for graduating students who died in the war

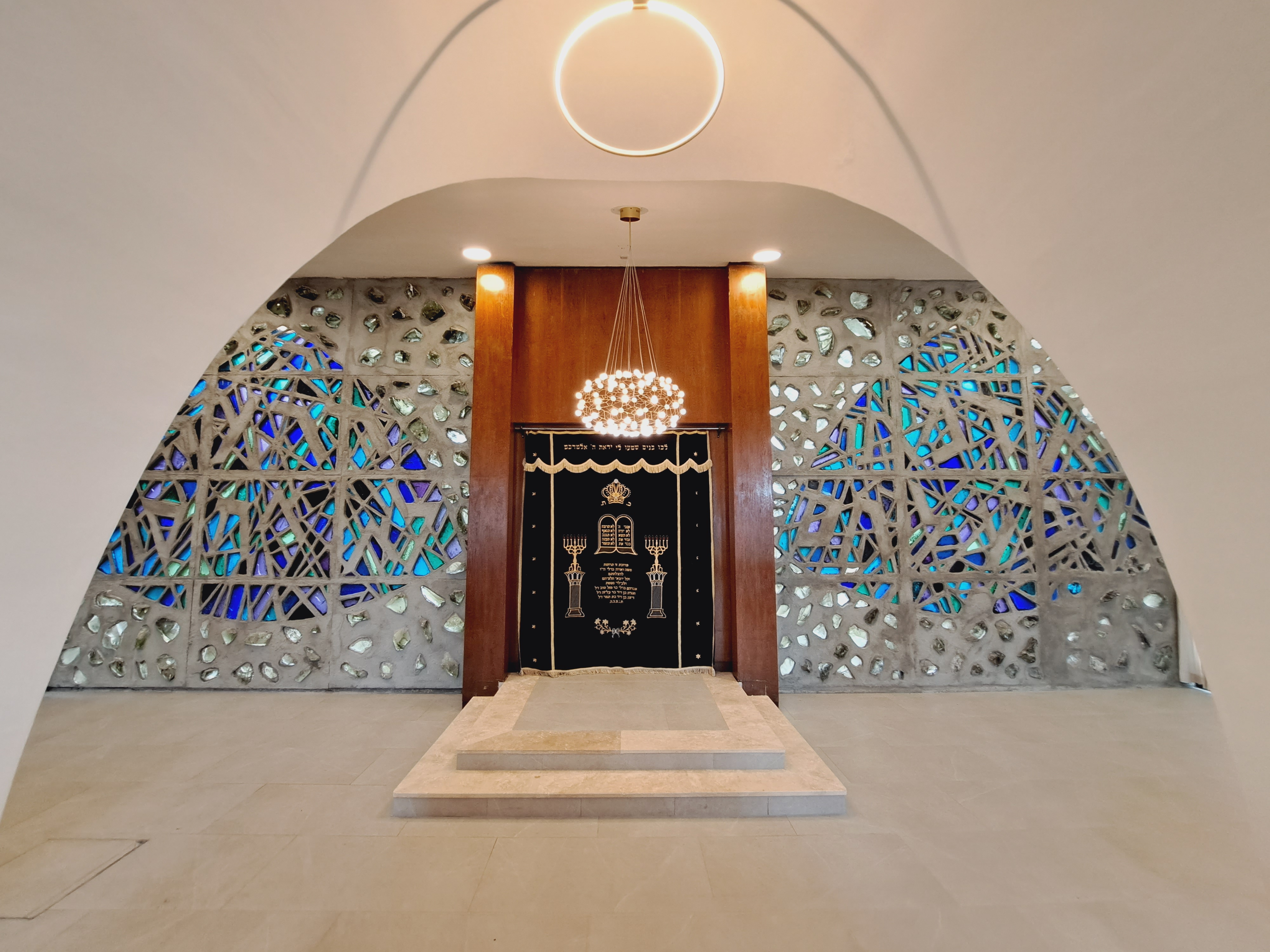
synagogue

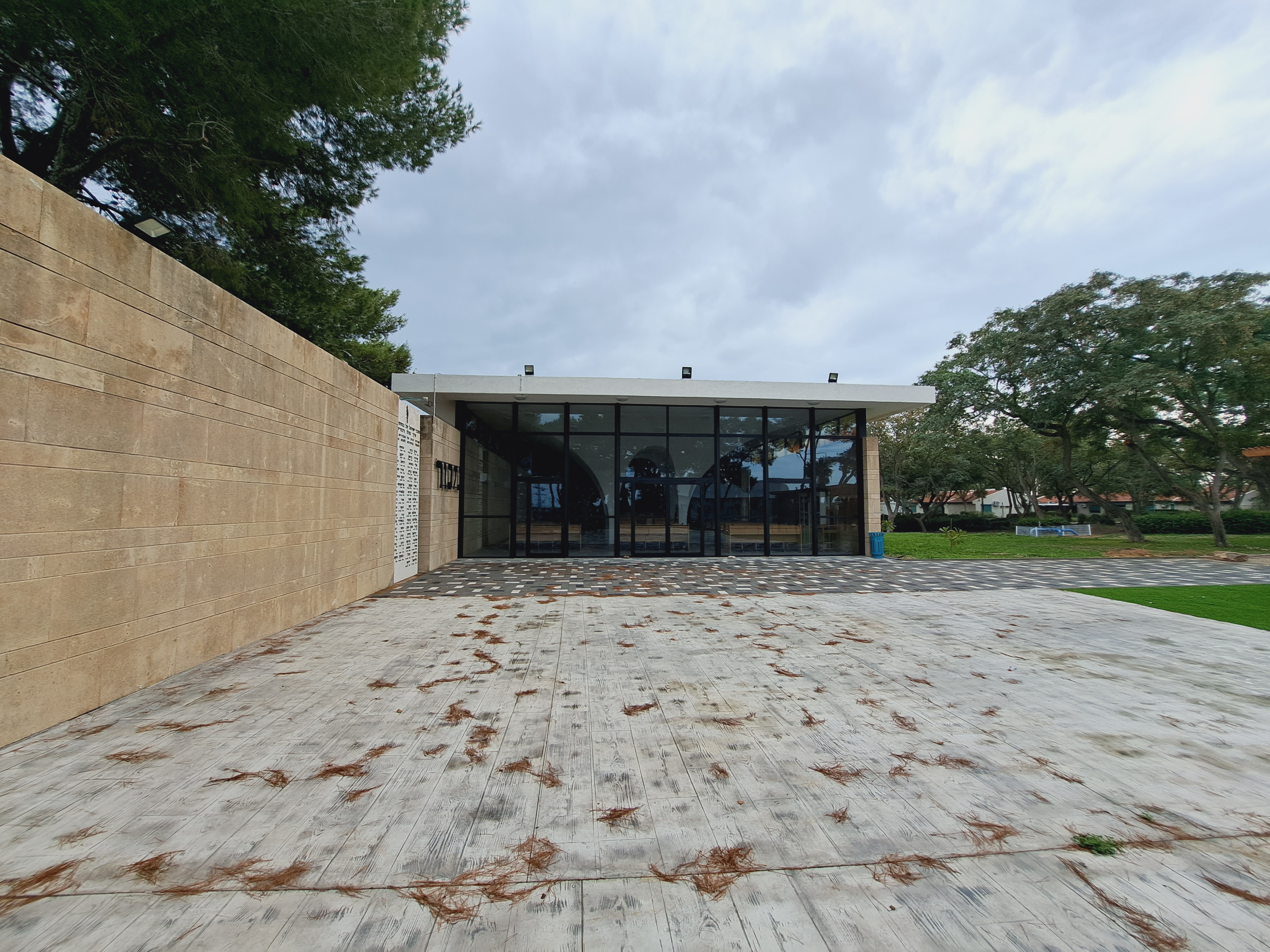
synagogue

== See also ==
- Education in Israel
