= Nitzan Bet =

Community settlement in southern Israel

Nitzan Bet: 'ניצן ב (Hebrew); نيتسان ب (Arabic)
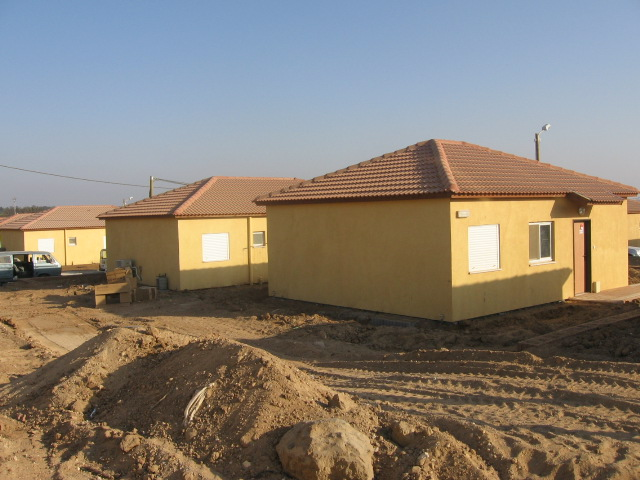

- Location within Ashkelon region of Israel
- Coordinates: 31°44′11″N 34°38′12″E
- Country: Israel
- District: Southern
- Subdistrict: Ashkelon
- Council: Hof Ashkelon
- Founded: 2007
- Founder: Former settlers
- Population (2024): 370

Nitzan Bet (Hebrew: ניצן ב') is a community settlement in southern Israel. Located between Ashdod and Ashkelon, next to Nitzan, it falls under the jurisdiction of Hof Ashkelon Regional Council and had a population of 370 in 2024.

== History ==
The village was established in 2007 to house former settlers from the Gaza Strip after they were evacuated as part of the disengagement plan.
