= Talmei Yaffe =

Moshav in southern Israel

Talmei Yaffe: תלמי יפה (Hebrew)
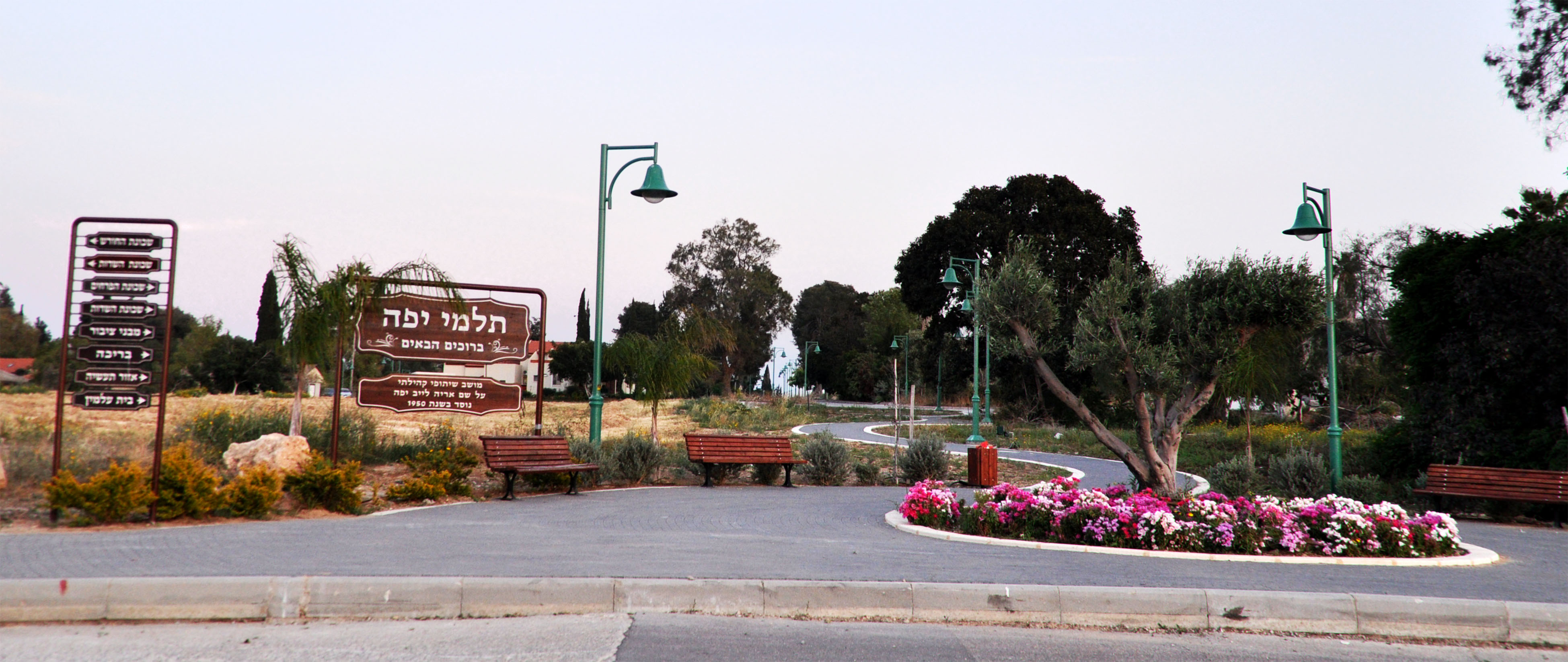
- Entrance of Talmei Yaffe

- Location within Ashkelon region of Israel
- Coordinates: 31°37′3″N 34°36′48″E
- Country: Israel
- District: Southern
- Subdistrict: Ashkelon
- Council: Hof Ashkelon
- Affiliation: HaOved HaTzioni
- Founded: 1950
- Founder: Polish and Romanian Jews
- Population (2024): 668

Talmei Yaffe (Hebrew: תַּלְמֵי יָפֶה, lit. 'Yaffe Furrows') is a moshav shitufi in southern Israel. Located near Ashkelon, it falls under the jurisdiction of Hof Ashkelon Regional Council. In 2024 it had a population of 668.

== History ==
Talmei Yaffe was founded in 1950 as a kibbutz by Jewish immigrants from Poland and Romania, on the lands of the depopulated Palestinian village of Barbara. It was named after Leib Yaffe, a director-general of Keren Hayesod who was killed in the car bombing of the Jewish Agency building in Jerusalem in 1948. In 1961 it was converted to a moshav shitufi.

In 2005 some families evacuated from settlements in Gush Katif were resettled in Talmei Yaffe following the Israeli disengagement from Gaza.
