= Beit Shikma =

Moshav in southern Israel

Beit Shikma: בית שיקמה (Hebrew)
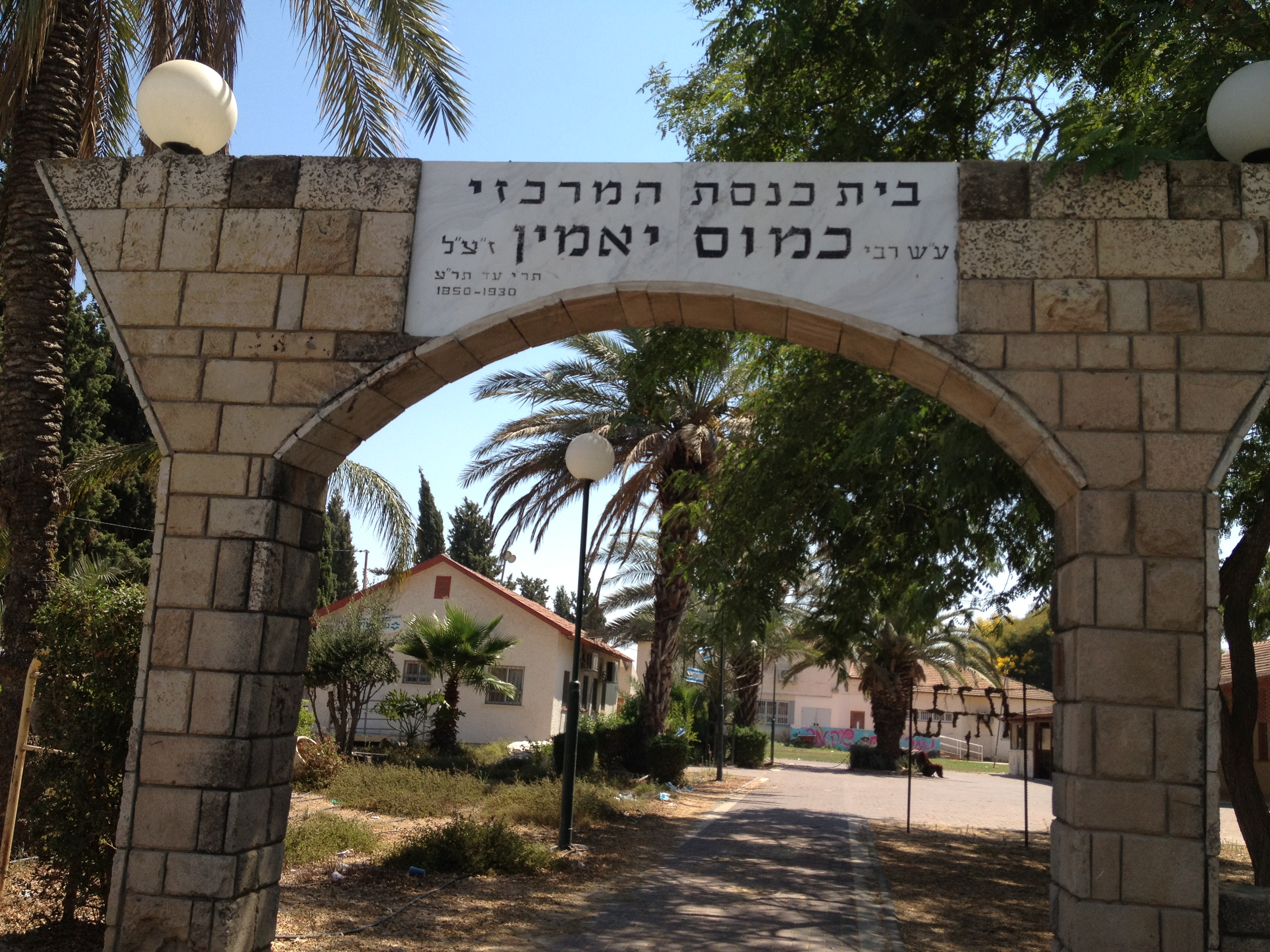

- Location within Ashkelon region of Israel Location within Israel
- Coordinates: 31°38′12″N 34°36′26″E
- Country: Israel
- District: Southern
- Subdistrict: Ashkelon
- Council: Hof Ashkelon
- Affiliation: Moshavim Movement
- Founded: 1950
- Founder: Libyan and Moroccan Jews
- Population (2024): 891

Beit Shikma (Hebrew: בֵּית שִׁקְמָה, lit. 'House of [the] Sycamore') is a moshav in southern Israel. Located near Ashkelon, it falls under the jurisdiction of Hof Ashkelon Regional Council. In 2024 it had a population of 891.

== History ==
The moshav was founded in 1950 by Jewish immigrants and refugees from Libya and Morocco. Built on the land of the depopulated Palestinian village of al-Jiyya, it was named after the large sycamore fig trees in the area.
