= HaOved HaTzioni =

HaOved HaTzioni העובד הציוני
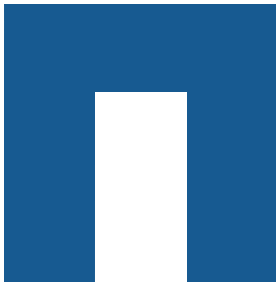
- Founded: 1936

Election symbol
- ח

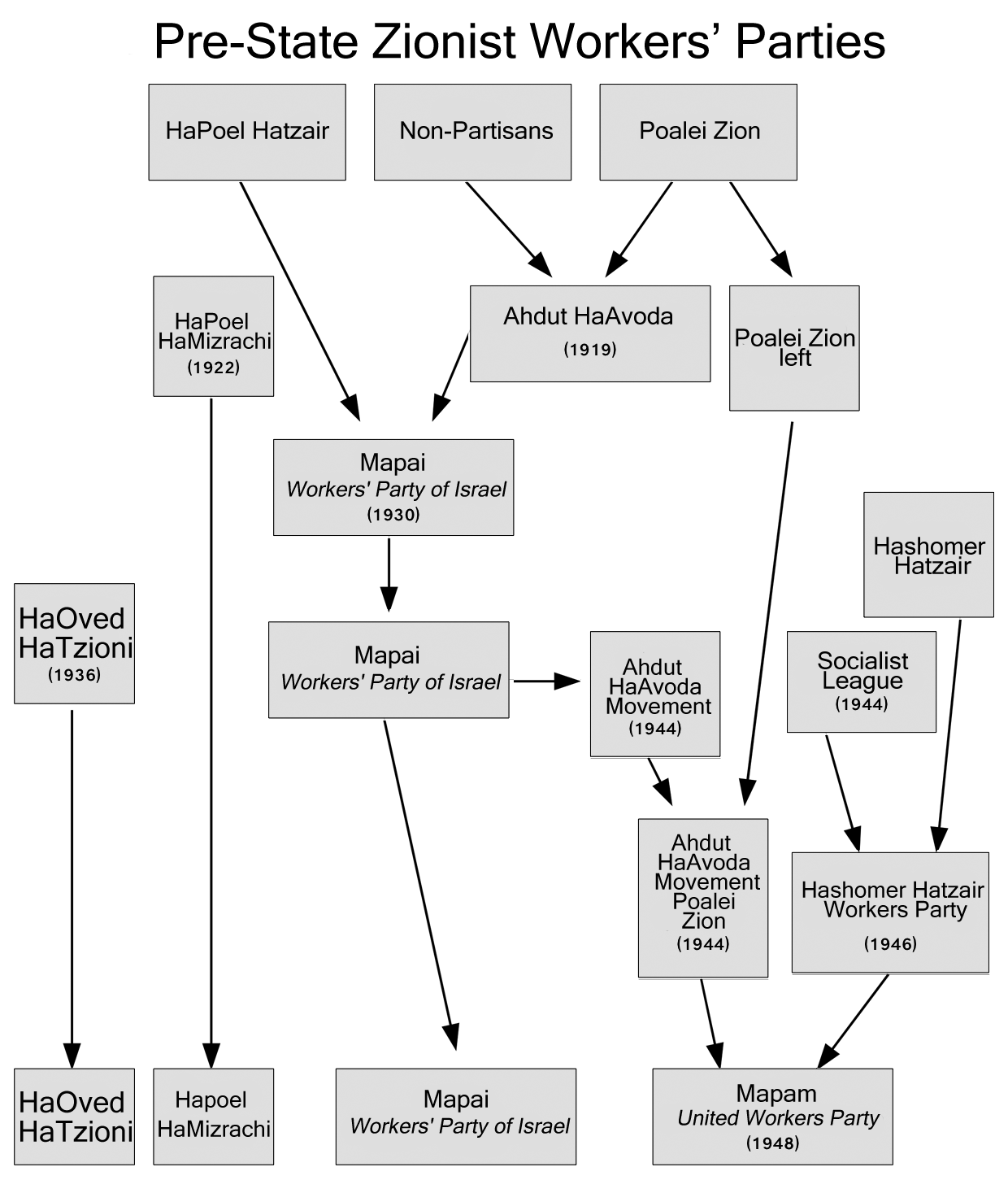
chart of zionist workers parties

HaOved HaTzioni (Hebrew: העובד הציוני, lit. 'The Zionist Worker') is a settlement movement in Israel.

The movement was established in 1936 by former members of HaNoar HaTzioni, and its first settlement, kibbutz Usha, was founded on 7 November 1937.

In 1948 the movement was one of the factions that established the Progressive Party.

== See also ==
- Politics of Israel
