= Netivot railway station =

Railway station in Israel

Netivot נתיבות
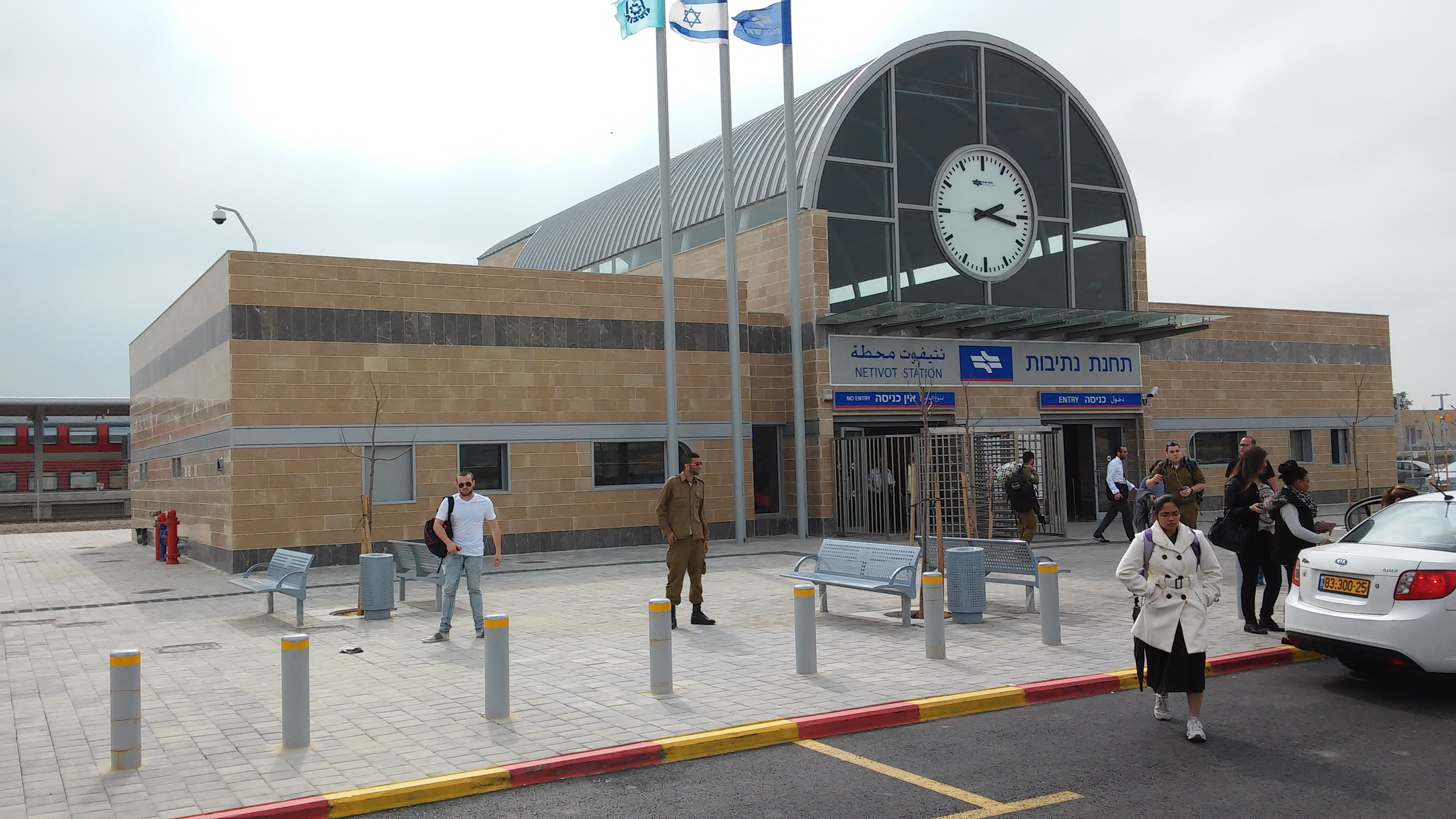

General information
- Location: Eli Sinai St., Netivot
- Coordinates: 31.4110°N 34.5719°E
- Platforms: 2
- Tracks: 4

Construction
- Parking: 264 spaces
- Accessible: yes

History
- Opened: February 15, 2015; 11 years ago
- Electrified: 26 September 2025; 10 months ago

Passengers
- 2019: 970,450
- Rank: 38 out of 68
Location

The Netivot railway station is a railway station situated in the western outskirts of Netivot, Israel. It is located on the Ashkelon–Beersheba railway between Sderot and Ofakim. A bus terminal is located adjacent to the station.

On the 12th of April 2011, the cornerstone of the station was laid in the presence of the Prime Minister, Binyamin Netanyahu and the Minister of Transportation, Yisrael Katz. Due to the 2014 Israel–Gaza conflict the original 2014 opening date was postponed to the 15th of February 2015.

Preceding station	Israel Railways	Following station
Sderot towards Binyamina	Binyamina–Beersheba	Ofakim towards Be'er Sheva–Center
Sderot towards Ashkelon	Ashkelon–Beersheba	Ofakim towards Be'er Sheva–Center
