= Festival for a Shekel =

The Festival for a Shekel (Hebrew: פסטיבל בשקל - Festival BeShekel) is an association working towards the strengthening of the Israeli peripheral areas economically and socially. The association mainly works with the youth and different communities of the areas through empowerment and cultural activities. The admission and participation fees at all events at the festivals are a symbolic single shekel.

Paying just one shekel plays a social statement regarding the high prices of admission to other cultural events around the country, which prevent many from going to and enjoying them. The symbolic admission fee ensures that the association's events are accessible by anyone, no matter their socio-economic status. The moral that the association aims to promote is that every person has the right to attend cultural events, and that culture should not be a luxury, rather it should be a right.

The association aims to expand cultural "intake", promote creativity and creation in local communities and neighborhoods, and creating a base for meetings between all ends of society.

The association was founded in 2001 by a group of friends and artists, among them Shanan Street (Hadag Nahash's lead singer), the festival's director Carmi Vartmann, singer Haim Ulliel, and others.

The festival is held in several peripheral towns and neighborhoods in Israel annually. With the help of local youth, vibrant festivals are held, and give a stage to bands, local talented people, as well as Israeli musicians, among them Berry Sakharof, HaYehudim, Hadag Nahash, Carlonia, The Church of Common Sense, Moshik Afia, Dudu Tassa, Michael Grailsummer, Geva Alon, Haim Ulliel, Idan Yeniv, Miri Mesika, Rami Fortis, Tipex, Sinregia, and others.

Since 2002, the festival has taken place in peripheral neighborhoods and towns, such as Jerusalem neighborhoods Katamon, Pisgat Ze'ev and Kiryat Menahem, Kiryat Shmona, Acre, Migdal HaEmek, Bet She'an, Gilboa Regional Council, Bat Yam, Lod, Kiryat Gat, Yeruham, Sderot, Dimona, Arad, Kiryat Malachi, Ma'alot Tarshiha, and others. The average number of participants in each event amounts to 7000 people.

On 22 August 2012, the festival was held at the "Welcome" Park at the entrance to Ma'alot Tarshiha. There were nearly 8000 participants at this occasion, as well as the participation of bands, singers, and theaters such as Berry Sakharof, Rami Fortis, Moshik Afia, Carolina, Los Capros, Florentine, Oushak el-Sheikh Imaam, Selfish Shepherd, and others.

The festival was held once again in Ma'alot Tarshiha in 2013, and hosted by Modi Bar-On.
