= Refusenik (disambiguation) =

A refusenik is someone who was denied permission to emigrate by the Soviet Union. It can also mean someone who refuses to comply with a rule etc.

Refusenik or refusnik may also refer to:

- An Israeli conscientious objector; see Refusal to serve in the Israel Defense Forces
- Refusenik (film), 2007 documentary by Laura Bialis
- Refusenik (Muslim), a term used by Irshad Manji in her 2005 book The Trouble with Islam Today
- The stage name of the Lithuanian musician Arturas Bumšteinas
- The Refuseniks, a precursor group to the Claudia Quintet
