= Ofakim railway station =

Railway station in Israel

Ofakim אופקים
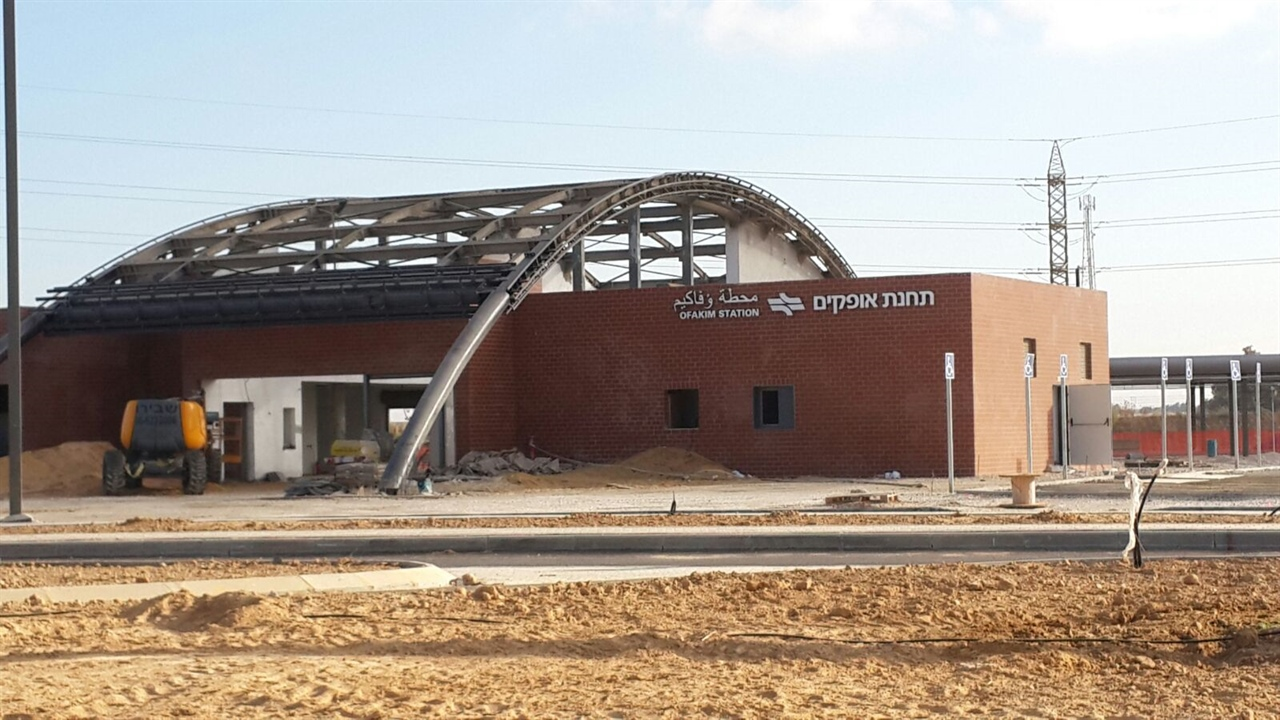
- Ofakim Railway Station in 2015

General information
- Location: Northern Industrial Area, Ofakim
- Coordinates: 31.3214°N 34.6338°E
- Platforms: 2

Construction
- Accessible: yes

History
- Opened: 31 December 2015; 10 years ago
- Electrified: 26 September 2025; 10 months ago

Passengers
- 2019: 864,528
- Rank: 43 out of 68
Location

The Ofakim railway station is a railway station situated in Ofakim, Israel. It is located on the Ashkelon–Beersheba railway between Netivot and Beersheba and was opened to the public on December 31, 2015. Next to the station, a new neighbourhood with affordable prices, specially designed for young people, is planned to be built by a NGO called Noah Initiative. The neighbourhood is designed as a Transit-oriented district, so the train will play a pivotal role in allowing the residents to live in the district while working in Beersheba or in the center of Israel.

Preceding station	Israel Railways	Following station
Netivot towards Binyamina	Binyamina–Beersheba	Be'er Sheva–North towards Be'er Sheva–Center
Netivot towards Ashkelon	Ashkelon–Beersheba	Be'er Sheva–North towards Be'er Sheva–Center
