= Sderot railway station =

Railway station in Israel

Sderot שדרות
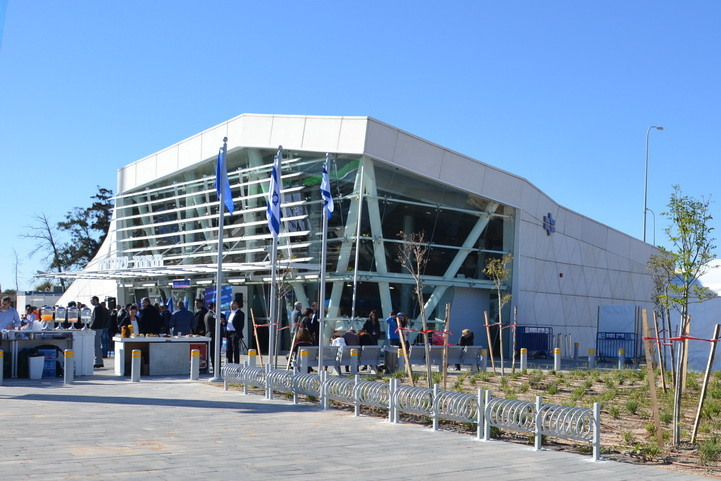

General information
- Location: 2 Train square, Sderot
- Coordinates: 31°30′57″N 34°35′14″E
- Platforms: 2
- Tracks: 2

Construction
- Accessible: yes

History
- Opened: 24 December 2013; 12 years ago
- Electrified: 26 September 2025; 13 months ago

Passengers
- 2019: 1,025,670
- Rank: 37 out of 68
Location

The Sderot railway station is a railway station located near the southern entrance to Sderot, Israel. It is situated on the Ashkelon–Beersheba railway.

The station was designed by Ami Shinar – Amir Mann Architects as a rocket-resistant building because of the sensitive security situation in Sderot during the last decade given its proximity to the Gaza Strip. This unusual need eventually led the architects to create an unusual design consisting of an irregular structure emerging from the ground.

Preceding station	Israel Railways	Following station
Ashkelon towards Binyamina	Binyamina–Beersheba	Netivot towards Be'er Sheva–Center
Ashkelon Terminus	Ashkelon–Beersheba	Netivot towards Be'er Sheva–Center
