= Sfatayim =

Israeli rock band

Sfatayim שפתיים
- Origin: Sderot, Israel
- Genres: Rock, Pop, Mizrahi
- Years active: 1985-1998
- Past members: Sami Lazmi; Haim Ulliel; Haim Ohana; Eli Ulliel; Yaakov Uzan

Sfatayim (Hebrew: שפתיים, [sfaˈtajim], "lips") was a rock band from Sderot, Israel. The band is considered to have consolidated an Israeli Moroccan style, blending the music of the mostly Moroccan immigrants of Sderot with international rock. The lead singer was Haïm Ulliel.

Keyboardist Yaakov Uzan started a band called HaHotzaa LaPoal (The Executioner) in 1988. In 1990, he renamed the group to Teapacks and himself to Kobi Oz. In 2016, he wrote the song Avodot kapayim about his time in Sfatayim, which also became the title track of the Teapacks album released that year.
