= Rock in the Red Zone =

Rock in the Red Zone is a documentary film directed and produced by Laura Bialis. The film centers around rock and roll bands that have come out of Sderot, a town in southern Israel that has been under almost daily attack for many years by Qassam rockets fired from Gaza by Hamas and Islamic Jihad, where local musicians repurposed one of the town's bomb shelters into a music club.

The film has been screened at multiple film festivals internationally and around the United States: AICE Israeli Film Festival (Australia), San Francisco Jewish Film Festival, Sonoma Jewish Film Festival, Washington Jewish Film Festival, Boston Jewish Film Festival, Atlanta Jewish Film Festival 2016, and the Rutgers Jewish Film Festival.
