= Heletz railway =

Railway line in Israel

Coordinates: 31.597673°N 34.665583°E

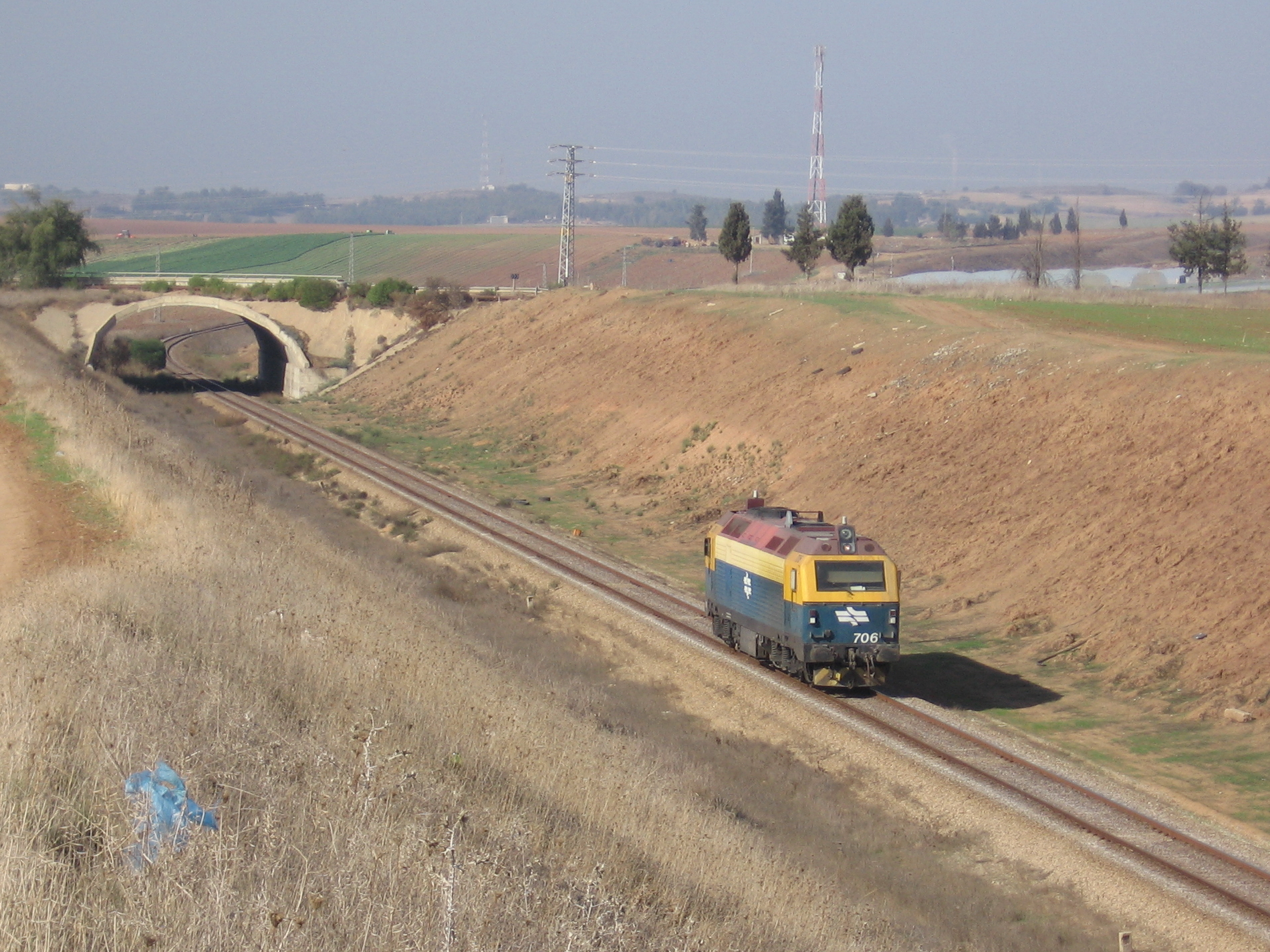
Lone JT42CW freight locomotive on the Heletz Railway near Sde David.

The Heletz Railway (Hebrew: מסילת חלץ, Mesilat Heletz) is a 20 km (12 mi) railway in southern Israel which connects the Railway to Beersheba from a point just south of Kiryat Gat to the Lod–Ashkelon railway near moshav Mavki'im. The track passes north to moshav Heletz, from which it derives its name.

== History ==
The railway was constructed by Israel Railways in the early 1980s, to provide a shortcut for freight trains from southern Israel headed for the Port of Ashdod. Previously, such trains had to be routed through the Lod Railway Station in central Israel. The Heletz railway was opened on 17 November 1982.The railway was once used for some limited passenger service, though today it is used by passenger trains only on an emergency basis—in instances when the Lod – Kiryat Gat section of the Railway to Beersheba is blocked. These circumstances have become much rarer following the opening of the Ashkelon–Beersheba railway.

The Ashkelon-Beersheba railway which opened in 2015 to the south of the Heletz railway provides an alternate rail connection between the Railway to Beersheba and the Lod-Ashkelon railway.

== Development ==
There are plans to connect the Heletz railway further south to the Tel Aviv-Beersheba Railway, after which the Heletz railway would pass south instead of north of Uza, Israel.

Israel Railways has also proposed a plan to extend the Heletz railway from Kiryat Gat to Tarqumiyah in the future as a means of providing a rail connection between the Gaza Strip and the southern West Bank.
