= List of twin towns and sister cities in Israel =

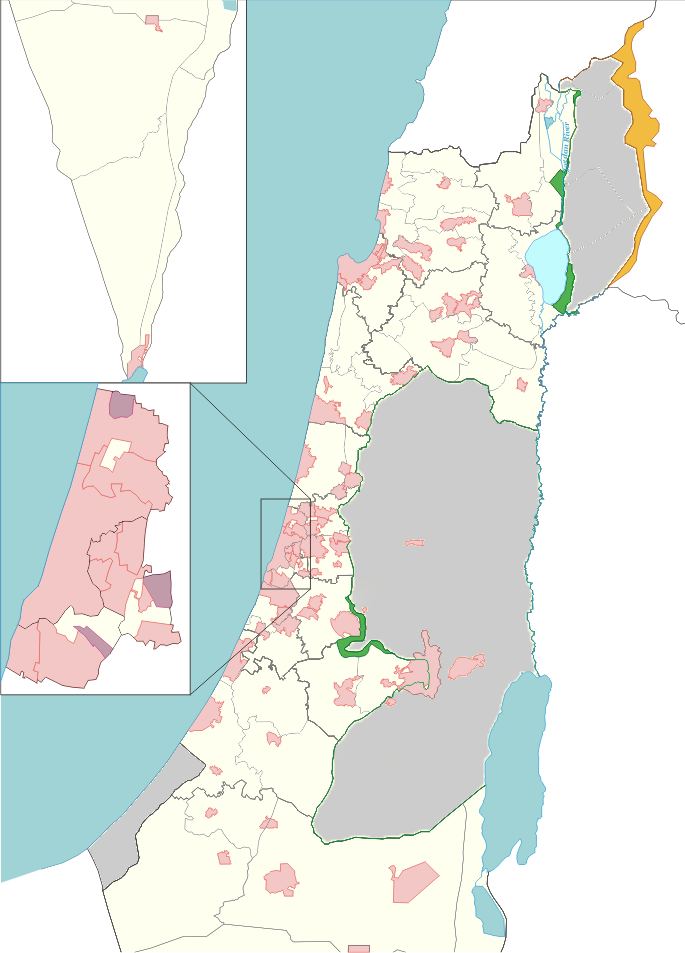

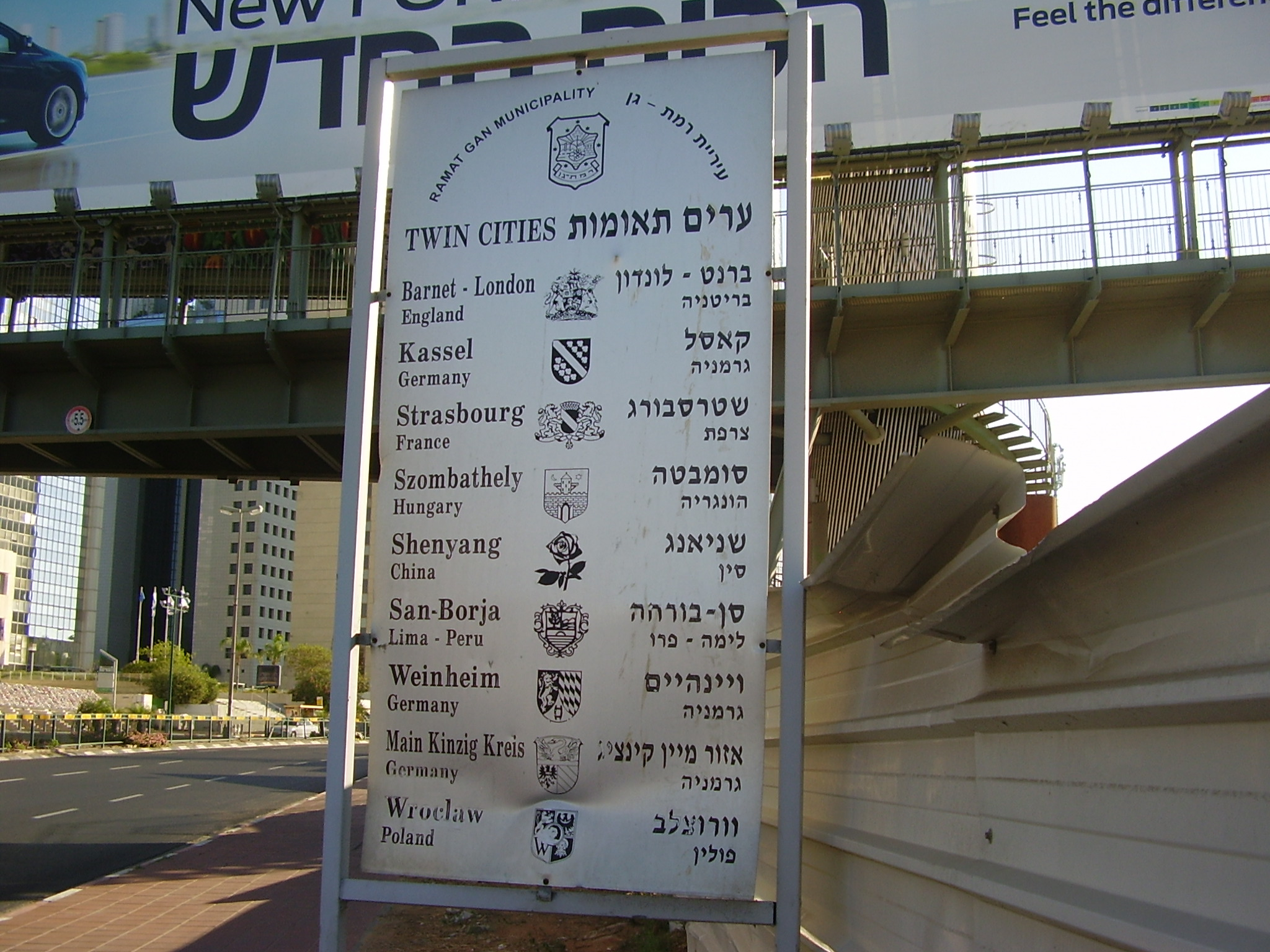
Signpost of twin towns in Ramat Gan

This is a list of places in Israel which have standing links to local communities in other countries known as "town twinning" (usually in Europe) or "sister cities" (usually in the rest of the world).

== A ==
Acre

- Bielsko-Biała, Poland
- Bregenz, Austria
- Nagykanizsa, Hungary
- Pisa, Italy
- Recklinghausen, Germany
- La Rochelle, France
- Trakai, Lithuania
- Warren, United States
- Youngstown, United States

Ashdod

- Arkhangelsk, Russia
- Atyrau, Kazakhstan
- Bahía Blanca, Argentina
- Bahir Dar, Ethiopia
- (Georgia (country)) Batumi, Georgia
- Bordeaux, France
- Brest, Belarus
- Iași, Romania
- Jūrmala, Latvia
- Spandau (Berlin), Germany
- Tampa, United States
- Wuhan, China
- Zaporizhzhia, Ukraine

Ashkelon

- Aix-en-Provence, France
- Côte Saint-Luc, Canada
- Entebbe, Uganda
- Grodno, Belarus
- Iquique, Chile
- (Georgia (country)) Kutaisi, Georgia
- Marmaris, Turkey
- Pankow (Berlin), Germany
- Portland, United States
- Sacramento, United States
- Uman, Ukraine
- Vadodara, India

== B ==
Bat Yam

- Aurich (district), Germany
- Kostroma, Russia
- Kragujevac, Serbia
- Kutno, Poland
- Livorno, Italy
- Neukölln (Berlin), Germany
- Valparaíso, Chile
- Villeurbanne, France
- Vinnytsia, Ukraine

Beersheba

- Adana, Turkey
- Addis Ababa, Ethiopia
- Cluj-Napoca, Romania
- Lyon, France
- Munich, Germany
- Niš, Serbia
- (Georgia (country)) Oni, Georgia
- Parramatta, Australia
- La Plata, Argentina
- Seattle, United States
- Winnipeg, Canada
- Wuppertal, Germany

Beit Shemesh

- Cocoa, United States
- Hangzhou, China
- Jersey City, United States
- Lancaster, United States
- Nordhausen, Germany
- Ramapo, United States
- Split, Croatia

Bnei Brak

- Brooklyn (New York), United States
- Lakewood, United States

== D ==
Dimona

- Andernach, Germany
- Sinaia, Romania

Drom HaSharon

- Emmendingen (district), Germany
- Neuwied, Germany

== E ==
Eilat

- Acapulco, Mexico
- Antibes, France
- Arica, Chile
- Kamen, Germany
- Kampen, Netherlands
- Karlovy Vary, Czech Republic
- Los Angeles, United States
- Palanga, Lithuania
- Piešťany, Slovakia
- Sopron, Hungary
- Sorrento, Italy
- Yalta, Ukraine
- Yinchuan, China

== G ==
Gan Yavne

- Puteaux, France

Gedera

- Roman, Romania
- Valence, France

Giv'at Shmuel

- Dubna, Russia
- Gołdap, Poland
- Stade, Germany

Givatayim

- Arad, Romania
- Chattanooga, United States
- Esslingen (district), Germany
- Harbin, China
- Mulhouse, France
- Ohrid, North Macedonia
- Oradea, Romania
- Sfântu Gheorghe, Romania
- Vác, Hungary

== H ==
Hadera

- Besançon, France
- Big Spring, United States
- Derbent, Russia
- El Paso, United States
- Nuremberg, Germany
- Rizhao, China
- Tomar, Portugal

Haifa

- Aalborg, Denmark
- Antwerp, Belgium
- Bremen, Germany
- Cape Town, South Africa
- Chengdu, China
- Düsseldorf, Germany
- Erfurt, Germany
- Fort Lauderdale, United States
- Limassol, Cyprus
- Mainz, Germany
- Manila, Philippines
- Mannheim, Germany
- Marseille, France
- Newcastle upon Tyne, England, United Kingdom
- Odesa, Ukraine
- Portsmouth, England, United Kingdom
- Rosario, Argentina
- San Francisco, United States
- Shanghai, China
- Shantou, China
- Shenzhen, China

Herzliya

- Alicante, Spain
- Banská Bystrica, Slovakia
- Beverly Hills, United States
- Columbus, United States
- Dnipro, Ukraine
- Funchal, Portugal
- Hollywood, United States
- Leipzig, Germany
- Marl, Germany
- Paphos, Cyprus
- San Bernardino, United States
- San Isidro, Argentina

Hevel Modi'in

- Ammerthal, Germany

Hod HaSharon

- Dorsten, Germany

Holon

- Anshan, China
- Cleveland, United States
- Dayton, United States
- Hann. Münden, Germany
- Mitte (Berlin), Germany
- Suresnes, France

== J ==
Jerusalem

- Ayabe, Japan
- Cusco, Peru
- Jersey City, United States
- New York City, United States
- Niterói, Brazil
- Rio de Janeiro, Brazil
- Salvador, Brazil

== K ==
Kadima-Zoran

- Allauch, France
- Frankfurt an der Oder, Germany

Karmiel

- Berat, Albania
- Câmpulung Moldovenesc, Romania
- Charlottenburg-Wilmersdorf (Berlin), Germany
- Denver, United States
- Hamar, Norway
- Kisvárda, Hungary
- Mangalia, Romania
- Metz, France
- Pittsburgh, United States

Kfar Saba

- Delft, Netherlands
- Gainesville, United States
- Jinan, China
- Mülheim an der Ruhr, Germany
- San José, Costa Rica
- Wiesbaden, Germany

Kiryat Bialik

- Hlybokaye, Belarus
- Ismayilli, Azerbaijan
- Radomsko, Poland
- Rosh HaAyin, Israel
- Steglitz-Zehlendorf (Berlin), Germany
- Zakynthos, Greece
- (Georgia (country)) Zestaponi, Georgia

Kiryat Ekron

- Akron, United States
- Bussy-Saint-Georges, France

Kiryat Motzkin

- Bad Kreuznach (district), Germany
- Bad Segeberg, Germany
- Haßberge (district), Germany
- Kaifeng, China
- Mariánské Lázně, Czech Republic
- Nyíregyháza, Hungary
- Orlando, United States
- Radzyń County, Poland
- Włodawa County, Poland

Kiryat Ono

- Dormagen, Germany
- Great Neck, United States
- Offenbach (district), Germany
- Smallingerland, Netherlands

Kiryat Yam

- Créteil, France
- Friedrichshain-Kreuzberg (Berlin), Germany
- Makó, Hungary
- (Georgia (country)) Poti, Georgia
- Sighetu Marmației, Romania

== L ==
Lod

- (Georgia (country)) Gori, Georgia
- Kraljevo, Serbia
- Piatra Neamț, Romania

== M ==
Ma'alot-Tarshiha

- Asti, Italy
- Birobidzhan, Russia
- Harrisburg, United States
- Perpignan, France
- Reichenbach im Vogtland, Germany

Mateh Asher

- Oldenburg, Germany
- West Des Moines, United States

Mateh Yehuda

- Luján de Cuyo, Argentina
- Nümbrecht, Germany
- Vantaa, Finland
- Würzburg (district), Germany

Misgav

- Pittsburgh, United States

Modi'in-Maccabim-Re'ut

- Banja Luka, Bosnia and Herzegovina
- Hagen, Germany
- Haikou, China

== N ==
Nahariya

- Bielefeld, Germany
- Issy-les-Moulineaux, France
- Kecskemét, Hungary
- Lefkada, Greece
- Liberec, Czech Republic
- Miami Beach, United States
- Offenbach am Main, Germany
- Stupino, Russia
- Tempelhof-Schöneberg (Berlin), Germany

Nazareth

- Baguio, Philippines
- Częstochowa, Poland
- Florence, Italy
- Nablus, Palestine
- Neubrandenburg, Germany

Ness Ziona

- Freiberg, Germany
- Le Grand-Quevilly, France
- Piotrków Trybunalski, Poland
- Qingdao, China
- Solingen, Germany

Netanya

- (Georgia (country)) Batumi, Georgia
- Birštonas, Lithuania
- Bournemouth, England, United Kingdom
- Changzhou, China
- Como, Italy
- Dortmund, Germany
- Gelendzhik, Russia
- Giessen, Germany
- Gold Coast, Australia
- Nice, France
- Nowy Sącz, Poland
- Peja, Kosovo
- Poděbrady, Czech Republic
- Richmond Hill, Canada
- Sarcelles, France
- Siófok, Hungary
- Stavanger, Norway
- Sunny Isles Beach, United States
- Xiamen, China

Nof HaGalil

- Alba Iulia, Romania
- Birobidzhan, Russia
- Chernivtsi, Ukraine
- Győr, Hungary
- Kikinda, Serbia
- Klagenfurt, Austria
- Leverkusen, Germany
- San Miguel de Tucumán, Argentina
- Uman, Ukraine

== O ==
Or Akiva

- Le Castellet, France
- Dmitrovsky District, Russia
- Hîncești, Moldova

== P ==
Pardes Hanna-Karkur

- Grasse, France

Pardesiya

- Viersen, Germany

Petah Tikva

- Bacău, Romania
- Cherkasy, Ukraine
- Chernihiv, Ukraine
- Chicago, United States
- Las Condes, Chile
- Gabrovo, Bulgaria
- Koblenz, Germany
- Międzyrzec Podlaski, Poland
- Șimleu Silvaniei, Romania
- Taichung, Taiwan
- Trondheim, Norway
- Yiyang, China

== R ==
Ra'anana

- Atlanta, United States
- Boulogne-Billancourt, France
- Bramsche, Germany
- Goslar, Germany
- Opsterland, Netherlands
- Poznań, Poland
- Rio de Janeiro, Brazil
- Tainan, Taiwan

Ramat Gan

- Barnet, England, United Kingdom
- Kassel, Germany
- Main-Kinzig (district), Germany
- Penza, Russia
- Phoenix, United States
- Qingdao, China
- Rio de Janeiro, Brazil
- San Borja, Peru
- Shenyang, China
- Strasbourg, France
- Szombathely, Hungary
- Taoyuan, Taiwan
- Weinheim, Germany
- Wrocław, Poland

Ramat HaSharon

- Dunkirk, France
- Georgsmarienhütte, Germany
- Saint-Maur-des-Fossés, France
- Tallahassee, United States

Ramla

- Daugavpils, Latvia
- Kansas City, United States
- Kielce, Poland
- Kuçovë, Albania
- Mekelle, Ethiopia
- Moers, Germany
- Panevėžys, Lithuania
- Vaughan, Canada
- Vyborg, Russia

Rehovot

- Albuquerque, United States
- Bistrița, Romania
- Grenoble, France
- Heidelberg, Germany
- Paraná, Argentina
- Rochester, United States
- Valjevo, Serbia

Rishon LeZion

- Admiralteysky (Saint Petersburg), Russia
- Brașov, Romania
- Debrecen, Hungary
- Gondar, Ethiopia
- Kaunas, Lithuania
- Kharkiv, Ukraine
- Lublin, Poland
- Münster, Germany
- Nîmes, France
- Prešov, Slovakia
- Teramo, Italy

Rosh HaAyin

- Birmingham, United States
- Kiryat Bialik, Israel
- Prague 1 (Prague), Czech Republic
- Vanves, France

== S ==
Sderot

- Antony, France
- Fryazino, Russia
- Steglitz-Zehlendorf (Berlin), Germany

== T ==
Tel Aviv

- Almaty, Kazakhstan
- Barcelona, Spain
- Beijing, China
- Berlin, Germany
- Bonn, Germany
- Budapest, Hungary
- Buenos Aires, Argentina
- Chișinău, Moldova
- Cologne, Germany
- Essen, Germany
- Frankfurt am Main, Germany
- Freiburg im Breisgau, Germany
- Incheon, South Korea
- Łódź, Poland
- Miami-Dade County, United States
- Milan, Italy
- Philadelphia, United States
- Sofia, Bulgaria
- Thessaloniki, Greece
- Toulouse, France
- Warsaw, Poland

Tel Mond

- Sarasota, United States

Tiberias

- Allentown, United States
- Great Neck Plaza, United States
- Montecatini Terme, Italy
- Montpellier, France
- Saint Paul, United States
- Saint-Raphaël, France
- Tulsa, United States
- Worms, Germany
- Wuxi, China

Tirat Carmel

- Maurepas, France
- Monheim am Rhein, Germany
- Shamakhi, Azerbaijan
- Veszprém, Hungary

== Y ==
Yokneam Illit

- La Garenne-Colombes, France
- Lugo, Italy
- Požega, Croatia
- San Pedro de Atacama, Chile
- Wiehl, Germany
