= Refusenik (film) =

- Promotional poster
- Directed by: Laura Bialis
- Release date: January 26, 2007 (Jerusalem Film Festival)
- Running time: 120 minutes
- Country: United States
- Languages: English; Russian; Hebrew

Refusenik is a 2007 documentary film by Laura Bialis that chronicles the struggle of Jews to emigrate from the Soviet Union in the 1960s and 1970s. A former refusenik, Natan Sharansky, appears in the film.

== Critical reception ==
The Village Voice calls it an "absorbing portrait of the refusenik movement." The New York Sun says that it is "a thorough and engaging nonfiction account of the plight of Soviet Jews systematically oppressed under communism as they had been under the tsars, and denied the right to emigrate to Israel once the Jewish state was formed in 1948."
