= Laura Bialis =

American born Israeli filmmaker

Laura Bialis (Hebrew: לורה ביאליס) is an American-Israeli filmmaker best known for directing and producing the documentary films Rock in the Red Zone (2015) and Refusenik (2008).

== Biography ==
Laura R. Bialis was born in Los Angeles, California and grew up in Los Angeles and Santa Barbara, California. She attended Westlake School for Girls in LA and San Marcos High School in Santa Barbara. She got her start in production as a summer intern at Rod Lathim's Access Theatre, a nationally acclaimed theater company for performers with disabilities.

Bialis graduated from Stanford University with a degree in history. At Stanford she specialized in wartime and post-war Eastern European studies, and became fascinated with underground resistance movements. While at Stanford, Bialis conducted research at the Hoover Institution Archive.

Bialis earned a Master of Fine Arts in Production from the University of Southern California's School of Cinema-Television. Though focused on the narrative filmmaking track, Bialis became drawn to documentary after her classmates’ positive reception to her first short documentary, Attitude (1997), which was initially created as a class project at USC. The film followed a day in the life of a 13-year-old athlete, actor, and musician, Tyler Dumm, who was blind and also a partial amputee. While at USC, Bialis also produced and directed Daybreak Berlin. The film is based on the memoir of German-American artist Ilse-Margret Vogel, who was active in Berlin's unofficial underground during World War II.

== Filmmaking career ==
Bialis met classmates Broderick Fox and Sarah Levy on the first day of USC film school in the fall of 1996. Nine months later, the three found themselves in the remote Lithuanian countryside, filming Holocaust survivor Judy Meisel as she searched for her father's grave in an abandoned Jewish cemetery just outside the tiny shtetl town of Jasvene. Their work resulted in the team's acclaimed feature documentary, Tak for Alt – Survival of a Human Spirit.

Bialis is the founder of the Foundation for Documentary Projects, a non-profit organization with the mission of creating documentaries and curricula about important historical and social issues.

=== Tak for Alt ===
Tak for Alt – Survival of a Human Spirit is a 1999 feature-length documentary directed by Laura Bialis, Broderick Fox, and Sarah Levy.

The documentary chronicles the story of Holocaust survivor Judy Meisel, whose experiences during World War II inspired a lifelong campaign for civil rights. The film weaves archival material and location footage of Meisel retracing her wartime journey – from her birth in a Lithuanian shtetl, to the Kovno ghetto where she worked slave labor in a boot factory, crawling across a frozen river after fleeing a death march from the Stutthoff Concentration Camp, where she watched her mother being taken to the gas chamber, and finally escaping to Denmark at age 16, weighing forty-seven pounds. Judy's path ultimately led to the United States, where, after witnessing race riots in 1963, she dedicated her life to education as a civil rights advocate, touring the country speaking to students and community groups about her experiences and the importance of respect and tolerance.

Tak for Alt (“Thanks for All” in Danish) received widespread critical acclaim and was honored by the Academy of Motion Picture Arts & Sciences as “one of the outstanding films of 1999.” It was included in the Los Angeles Jewish Film Festival, was released theatrically in Los Angeles and aired on PBS. Tak for Alt won the Anti-Defamation League's Dore Schary Award.

The Jewish Voice said, “The hour-long film is awesome in its method of telling Meisel's amazing story,” and The Hollywood Reporter called it, “a grandly done production.” Film critic Ella Taylor called it “searing” Reviewer Carrie Rickey of The Philadelphia Inquirer wrote, “an extraordinary documentary about an extraordinary life,” and “listening to Meisel, it is as though Anne Frank had miraculously lived.” Hundreds of thousands of high school students have viewed the film as part of Holocaust education programs along with an accompanying curriculum guide, written by Beth Seldin Dotan and Kathleen McSharry. The film continues to screen annually in schools across the United States.

=== Refusenik ===
Refusenik is a 2008 feature-length documentary written, directed, and produced by Laura Bialis, and co-produced by Stephanie Seldin Howard. Refusenik is the first retrospective documentary to chronicle the thirty-year international human rights campaign to free more than 1.5 million Soviet Jews who tried to escape the pervasive anti-Semitism of postwar Russia. Refuseniks is the term that Soviet Jews gave themselves when they were refused exit visas.

Told through the eyes of activists on both sides of the Iron Curtain, the film shows how a small grassroots effort bold enough to confront the Cold War superpower transformed into an international human rights campaign. The film is a tapestry of first-person accounts of heroism, sacrifice, and ultimately, liberation. “One of the proudest chapters in Jewish history, the story of the refuseniks demonstrates the need for Jewish solidarity, the importance of the State of Israel, and the responsibilities we face as individuals living in a democracy,” read a review in Jewish Current Issues. Much of the material used in Refusenik was unique and exclusive to the film. Interviews with leaders in the movement (including Anatoly Sharansky) were some of the first ever to be recorded. Many of the photographs and covert film footage – some of it smuggled out of the Soviet Union – had never been seen before by a large audience, and helped make Refusenik a unique portrait of this important story. “Rarely is the subject (of human rights abuses) addressed as effectively as it is in Laura Bialis' absorbing new documentary, Refusenik,” read a review in The Seattle Times. “It symbolized hope over tragedy, and the triumph of the human spirit." In an interview with the Jewish Daily Forward, Bialis said, “The film changed my life. I realized how much each one of us can contribute to what is happening in the world. Working with this material really inspired me not to wait for someone else to change things but to take things into my own hands.”

The film received a 5-star rating from Time Out Chicago reporter Andrea Gronvall who stated, “Bialis, a meticulous researcher and a born storyteller, backs up contemporary interviews with rare footage culled from Russian archives and old home movies.” The Chicago Tribune noted the magnitude of the documentary, “This is a film about an important era in modern history, but it also speaks volumes about the everlasting potency and beauty of the human spirit in search of freedom.” And Variety, called it “absorbing.” Similar reviews in The Jerusalem Post, Seattle Post-Intelligencer and New York Jewish Week were favorable. The film was theatrically released in 15 cities across the United States, and in over 50 community screenings internationally. It has been broadcast in Israel on IBA Channel 1, and Yes.

=== View from the Bridge – Stories from Kosovo (2008) ===
View from the Bridge – Stories from Kosovois a feature-length documentary produced and directed by Laura Bialis and John Ealer that explores tensions among Serbs, Albanians, and Roma (Gypsies) in the ethnically divided Kosovo town of Mitrovica. In order to portray the differences – and similarities – among those disparate groups, Ealer and Bialis opted for a personal approach to their subject matter, letting the people of Kosovo speak for themselves. Thus, View from the Bridge relies on first-person accounts – “sometimes hopeful, sometimes tragic” – of the lives of those suffering the physical and emotional consequences of the politics of divisiveness. Bialis became interested in the subject matter after meeting a United Nations worker who shared her stories of traveling to Kosovo and the struggle that existed there to recover both politically and societally. “When politics fuels polarization, no society is immune to violence,” noted Bialis in an interview with Alt Film Guide.

The film premiered at the 14th annual Slamdance International Film Festival in Park City, Utah, (9) and was broadcast in a number of European markets. The European Union and NATO also used the film in training staff working to rebuild Kosovo.

=== Rock in the Red Zone ===
Rock in the Red Zone is a 2015 documentary film directed and produced by Laura Bialis about the rock and roll bands that have come out of Sderot, a town in southern Israel that has been under almost daily attack for many years by Qassam rockets fired from Gaza by Hamas and Islamic Jihad. Young musicians use one of the town's bomb shelters to create and perform music. This documentary offers a personal view from the ground on the frontlines of an endless war, and a powerful exploration into the lives and art of musicians struggling to create in a conflict zone.

“It is a film that strives to be about place, and about individuals and self-expression in spite of, or because of, the most trying of situations. Yet it is also, inevitably a film that stands outside of global politics, to reveal much to admire in the resilience, spirit, and creativity of Israel and its citizens.”, said Laura Bialis.

The film screened at more than 250 community screenings and film festivals around the world, holding its international premiere at the Haifa International Film Festival, and US premiere at the San Francisco Jewish Film Festival. David Brinn of the Jerusalem Post calls it “One of the best Israeli docs ever.” He explains, “Expertly combining riveting real-time footage of rocket attacks – some of them involving some of the main subjects in the film – and unhurried cinema verité scenes of debates, breakdowns, Color Red siren chaos and loving moments surrounding music, Bialis turns this from a ‘fish out of water’ music scene film ... into a gripping encounter with life and resilience, choices, defeats and triumphs.”

Sam Weisberg of The Village Voice wrote that the film is “chilling, heartbreaking…poignant.” A Huffington Post review said, ”The film received a standing ovation when presented at the (Other Israel Film in New York) festival and more importantly, almost 100% of the audience stayed to discuss and better understand the situation.”

Bialis first heard about the Israeli town of Sderot from a friend who sent her articles in May 2007, when the city was under nearly constant fire. She read about the thriving music scene and bands like Teapacks, Knesiyat Hasechel (Church of Reason) and Sfatayim (Lips), which had all started out in the southern city which had gained the reputation of “ir hamusica,” the city of music. Bialis followed the sounds to Sderot because as she narrates in the film, “I’d always heard that good music comes from hard places.” Her planned three-week shoot turned into a two-year stay from 2007 to 2009, allowing Bialis to take viewers deeply into the lives of people who feel marginalized by their own country.

In 2008, Bialis married Sderot musician Avi Vaknin, one of the film's subjects.

Other musicians featured in the film include Micha Biton, Robby Elmaliah, and Yagit Haso.

=== VISHNIAC (2023) ===
Bialis is the director and producer of the feature documentary VISHNIAC (2023), a film that examines the life and legacy of photographer Roman Vishniac, whose images of Jewish communities in Eastern Europe became some of the most significant visual records of pre‑Holocaust Jewish life. The documentary follows Vishniac's artistic evolution-from his early social documentary work to his later innovations in scientific photography and incorporates extensive archival materials and interviews. Produced through Katahdin Productions, VISHNIAC marks one of Bialis’s major recent works and continues her focus on historical memory and Jewish cultural heritage.

== Filmography ==
- Vishniac (2023)
- Rock in the Red Zone (2015)
- Refusenik (2008)
- View From the Bridge: Stories from Kosovo (2008)
- Daybreak Berlin (2000)
- Tak for Alt: Survival of a Human Spirit (1999)
- Attitude (1997)
