= Ofakim =

City in southern Israel

Ofakim אופקים
- City
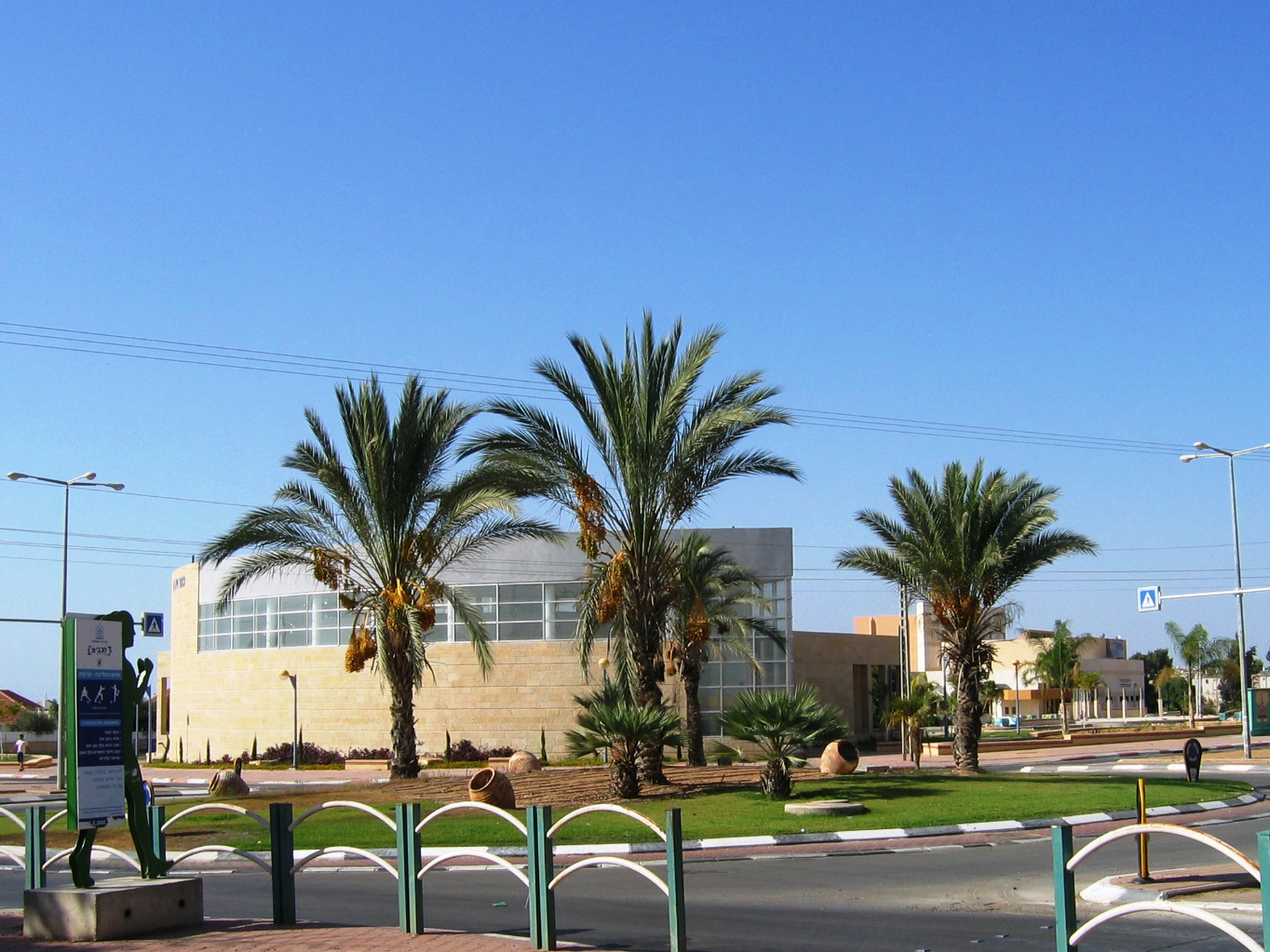
- Street in Ofakim

- Coat of arms

- Location within Northwest Negev region of Israel Location within Israel
- Coordinates: 31°18′38″N 34°37′11″E
- Country: Israel
- District: Southern
- Subdistrict: Beersheba
- Natural Region: Besor
- Founded: 19 April 1955

Government
  - Type: Mayor–council
  - Body: Municipality of Ofakim
  - Mayor: Yitzhak Danino (Likud)

Area
  - Total: 10,273 dunams (10.273 km^{2}; 3.966 sq mi)

Population (2024)
  - Total: 39,893
  - Density: 3,883.3/km^{2} (10,058/sq mi)

Ethnicity
  - Jews and others: 99.3%
  - Arabs: 0.7%
- Time zone: UTC+2 (IST)
  - Summer (DST): UTC+3 (IDT)
- Name meaning: Horizons
- Website: www.ofaqim.muni.il

Ofakim (Hebrew: אופקים, lit. 'Horizons') is a city in the Southern District of Israel, 20 kilometers (12.4 mi) west of Beersheba. It achieved municipal status in 1955. It has an area of 10,000 dunams (~3.9 sq mi; 10 km^{2}). In 2024 it had a population of 39,893.

Ofakim was established as a development town in 1955. For many years it was a major textile manufacturing center until outsourcing led to the closure of factories. As a result, Ofakim suffered from poverty and unemployment. Since the 2000s, new businesses have opened, improving the economic outlook.

During the October 7 attacks in 2023, Ofakim was attacked by Hamas militants who infiltrated the city and killed 47 residents.

== History ==
Remains from the Byzantine era through to the end of the Fatimid era have been excavated here.

=== Ottoman era ===
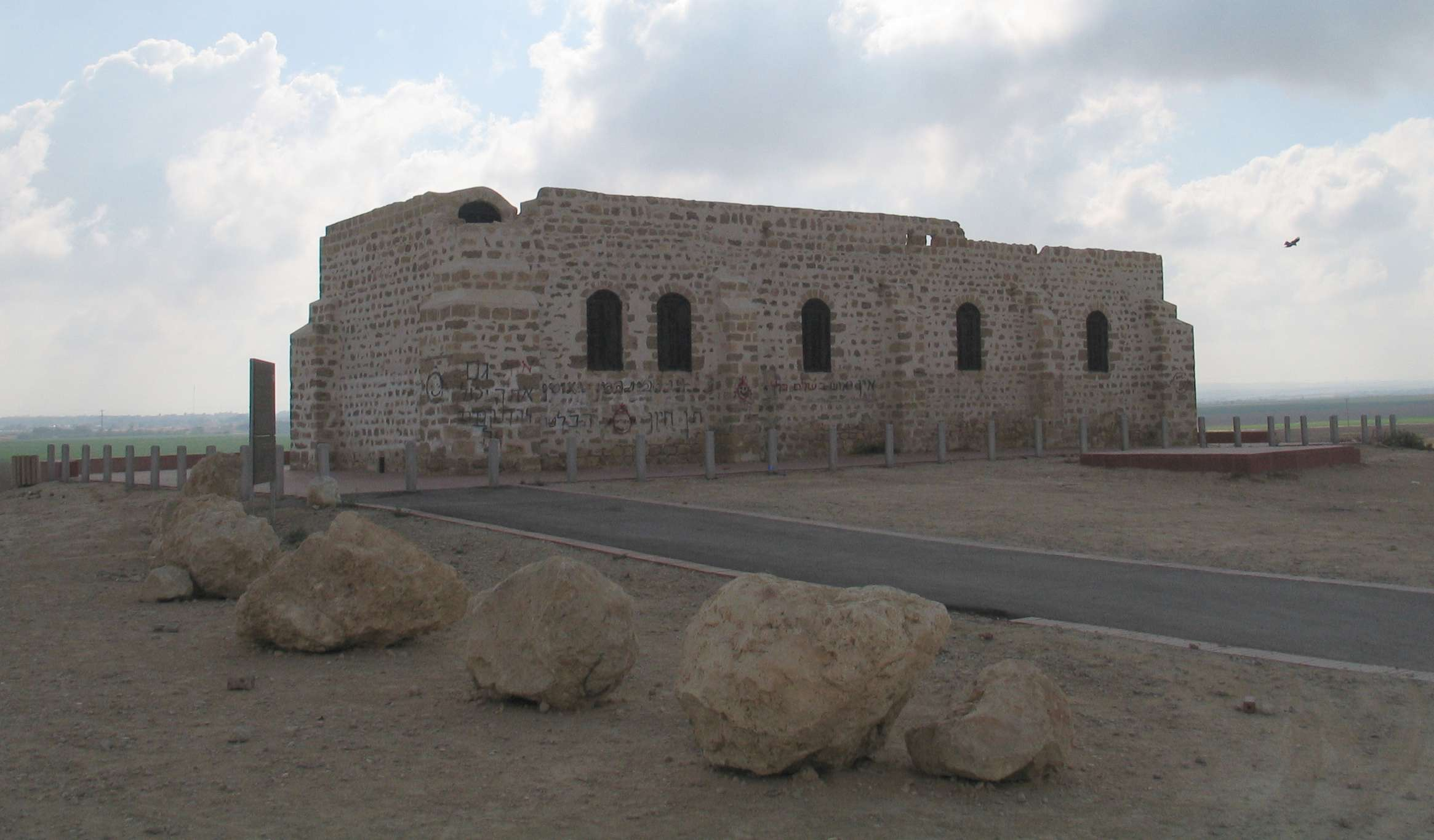
Patish (Futais) "fort" (he)

In 1863, Victor Guérin visited ruins here and described them: "These ruins occupy a broken plateau on the south bank of the torrent. Masses of material strew the ground over an extent of 1,800 metres of circumference. Everything is entirely overthrown except ten round constructions, each surmounted by a little pointed cupola built of well-rounded stones. Probably these buildings were intended for the storage of grain. In the bed of the Wady there is an ancient well containing abundance of excellent water."

In 1883, the SWP described Khurbet Futeis as "A large ruin on the north bank of the valley".

=== Modern era ===
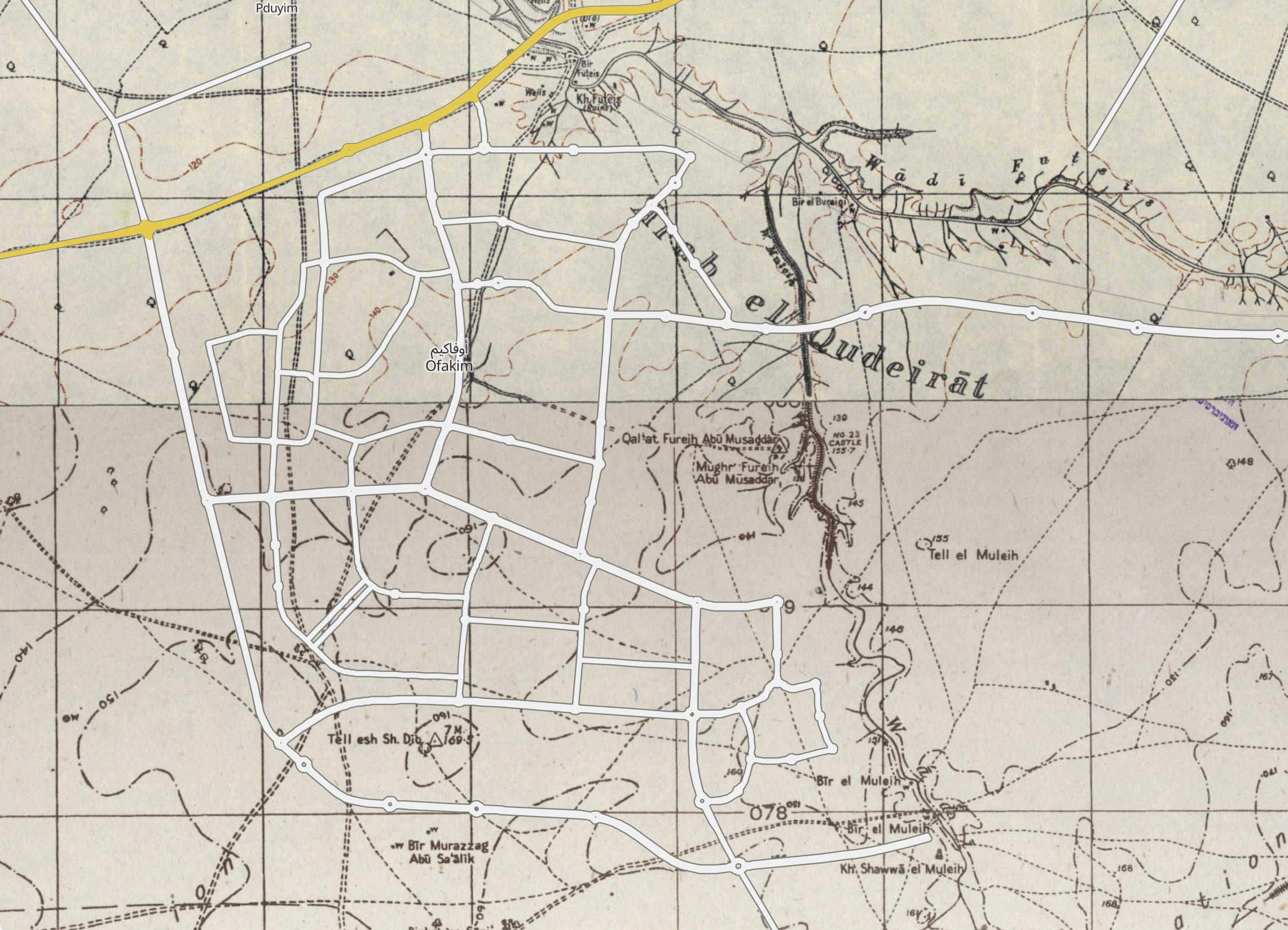
Map of the area of Ofakim in 1948, from the Survey of Palestine, overlaid with the modern day street plan

Ofakim was established in 1955 as an urban center for rural communities in the south.

The original houses of Ofakim were built about 1km south-west of Khirbet Futeis/Futais, now called Horbat Patish, which was the site of a large settlement during the Byzantine and early Islamic periods. That settlement is usually identified with Patish/Photis that appeared on the Madaba map. Horbat Patish is now located on the north edge of Ofakim. East of Ofakim is the remains of a large building from late Ottoman times, locally known as "Patish fort" but Petersen considered its function to be unclear.

By mid-July, during the 1948 War (Operation An-Far), the area fell to the IDF. The Bedouin families living there fled to Al-Muharraqa, and from there they were expelled to the Gaza Strip.

The first inhabitants consisted of immigrant families from mainly Morocco (seventeen families) and four families from Tunisia and Egypt. The population in 1955 was about 600. The immigrants were housed in huts and tin shacks until the construction of permanent housing. In the city's early years, the construction industry was the main source of income.

In late 1956, after the expulsion of Jews from Egypt following the Suez Crisis, 150 Egyptian-Jewish families, some of them Karaite Jews, settled in Ofakim. In the following years, 170 Jewish families from Iran arrived, along with immigrants from India and Romania. In 1958, Ofakim was granted local council status.

In the late 1950s, the construction industry was still the main employer, and some residents also worked in agriculture nearby, but industry also began to be established in Ofakim, starting with a diamond polishing plant, followed by two textile factories that opened in 1959. At the same time, the town's streets were paved, public parks were established, and schools were founded. In 1961, the population was 4,600.

As in other development towns, the industrial sector historically played an important part in Ofakim's economy. In 1972, 32% of the salaried workers (754 people) were in this sector, and in 1983—924 people (23%). During this period, the textile industry grew to dominate Ofakim's economy. Numerous textile plants were set up, and the industry employed by far the most workers, ranging from 72% (1982–83) to 82% (1972). The Of–Ar (short for Ofakim–Argentina) textile factory was a major employer. In 1983, the population had grown to 12,600.

Ofakim's economy declined after Israeli textile manufacturers began closing their factories in Israel to move their production to other countries with lower labor costs, mainly in Southwest Asia, and to Egypt and Jordan after Israel signed peace treaties with those two countries. Starting in the mid-1980s, the city's textile mills began to shut down, with the last one closing in 1995, rendering much of the population unemployed. In the early 1990s, during the mass migration of Jews from the former Soviet Union to Israel, more than 7,000 Soviet immigrants arrived in Ofakim, and were provided with heavily subsidized housing. This fueled further competition for jobs, and due to the fact that Soviet immigrants were typically better educated than the mainly unskilled or semi-skilled veteran population, they were better able to get the few jobs available. The city also absorbed immigrants from Ethiopia during this time. A few more plants moved into the city in the 1990s, including an electronics factory in 1996, but unemployment remained high. Ofakim gained a reputation as an economically depressed city in Israel.

In 1997, it had the highest unemployment rate in Israel, at 15.3%. It also had the highest unemployment rate in 2004, at slightly over 14%. In 2008, Haaretz reported: "Nearly one-third of the inhabitants are supported by the welfare department and hundreds of families receive aid, including food, from non-profit organizations. Many of the inhabitants in their 50s and 60s have been dreaming of fleeing Ofakim since they were 20. When they retire, they leave."

In the 2007, the Israeli Interior Ministry dismissed Ofakim mayor Avi Asaraf and his entire city council from their posts for failing to implement a recovery plan for Ofakim. Zvika Greengold became the new mayor.

Throughout the 2000s and 2010s, Ofakim gradually saw improvements in its economy. Tax incentives were given to open new factories in Ofakim, and a branch of MATI, an organization that supports small businesses, was opened. The high-tech industry also entered Ofakim. The city is currently undergoing a series of major development projects.

Ofakim was infiltrated by Hamas forces on October 7 attacks. Hamas first attacked the Mishor Hagefen neighborhood. Upon entering they shot an old woman. Hamas attacked civilians in their homes during the panic from Hamas rocket attacks. The subsequent Battle of Ofakim saw police, armed residents, and off-duty soldiers battle the terrorists before IDF reinforcements arrived. The city was declared as cleared early the following morning. During the battle, Hamas militants held civilian hostages while engaging in battle with Israeli forces. A total of 47 residents of the city were killed in fighting in the city as well as elsewhere in southern Israel. In Ofakim 27 residents and including six police were killed in the fighting. Among the weapons held by Hamas militants in their assault were grenades, anti-tank rockets, plastic explosives and land mines.

== Demographics ==
Historical population
Year	Pop.	±%
1972	9,400	—
1983	12,700	+35.1%
1995	20,700	+63.0%
2008	24,000	+15.9%
2022	35,355	+47.3%
2024	39,894	+12.8%

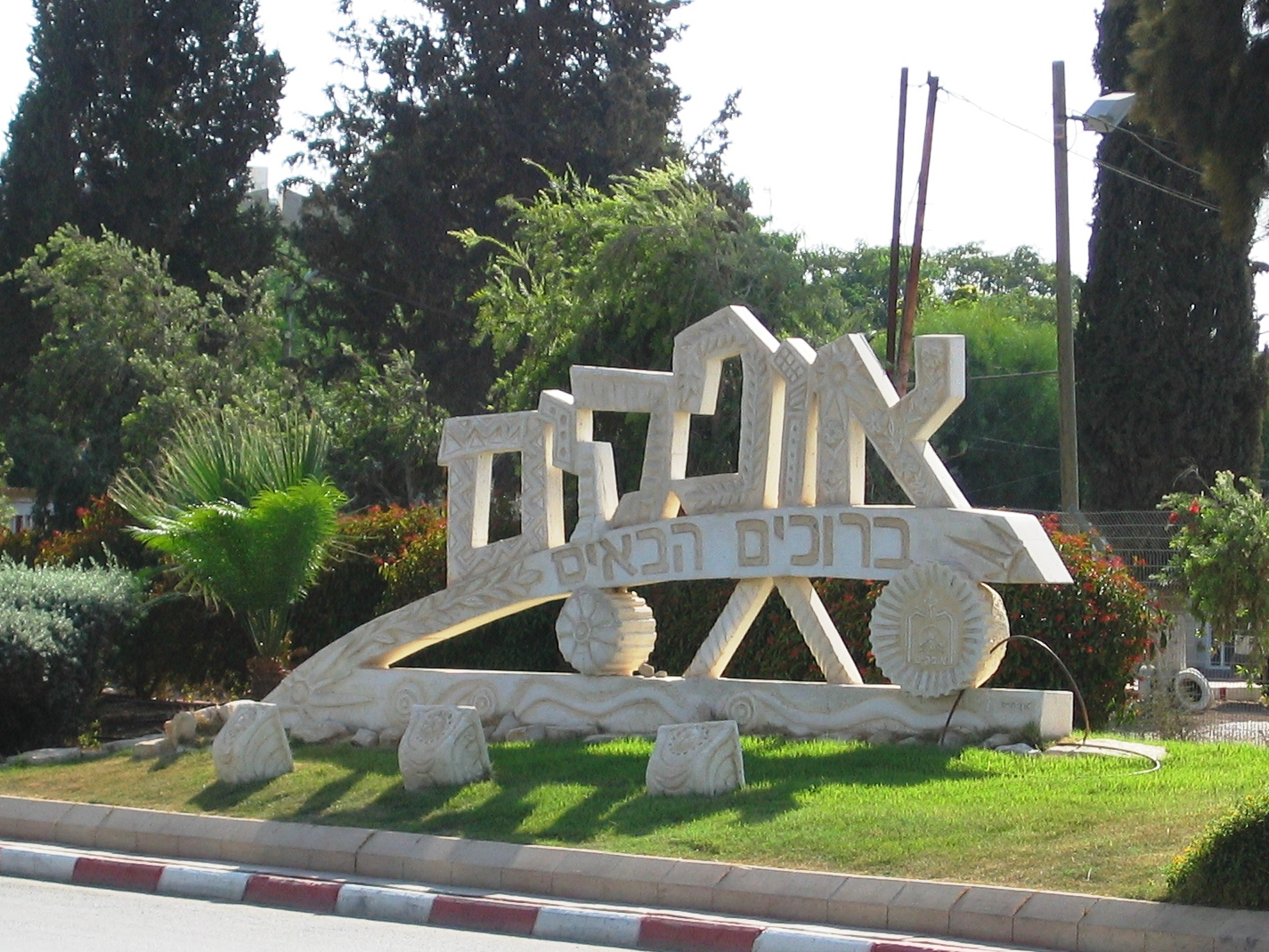
Entrance to Ofakim

In 2010, about one-fifth of the residents were ultra-Orthodox, and one third were immigrants from the former Soviet Union. Most of the rest were members and descendants of the founding generation of the immigrants who arrived in the town in the 1950s and 1960s. In addition, there are small communities of Ethiopian Jews and Palestinians, originally from the Gaza Strip, who were resettled in Israel after collaborating with Israeli authorities.

According to the Israel Central Bureau of Statistics (CBS), Ofakim had a population of 30,662 in 2019, and the population is growing at a rate of 1.4% a year. The percentage of the share of the Israeli Arab population of Ofakim is very small, and about 0.7%.

== Education ==
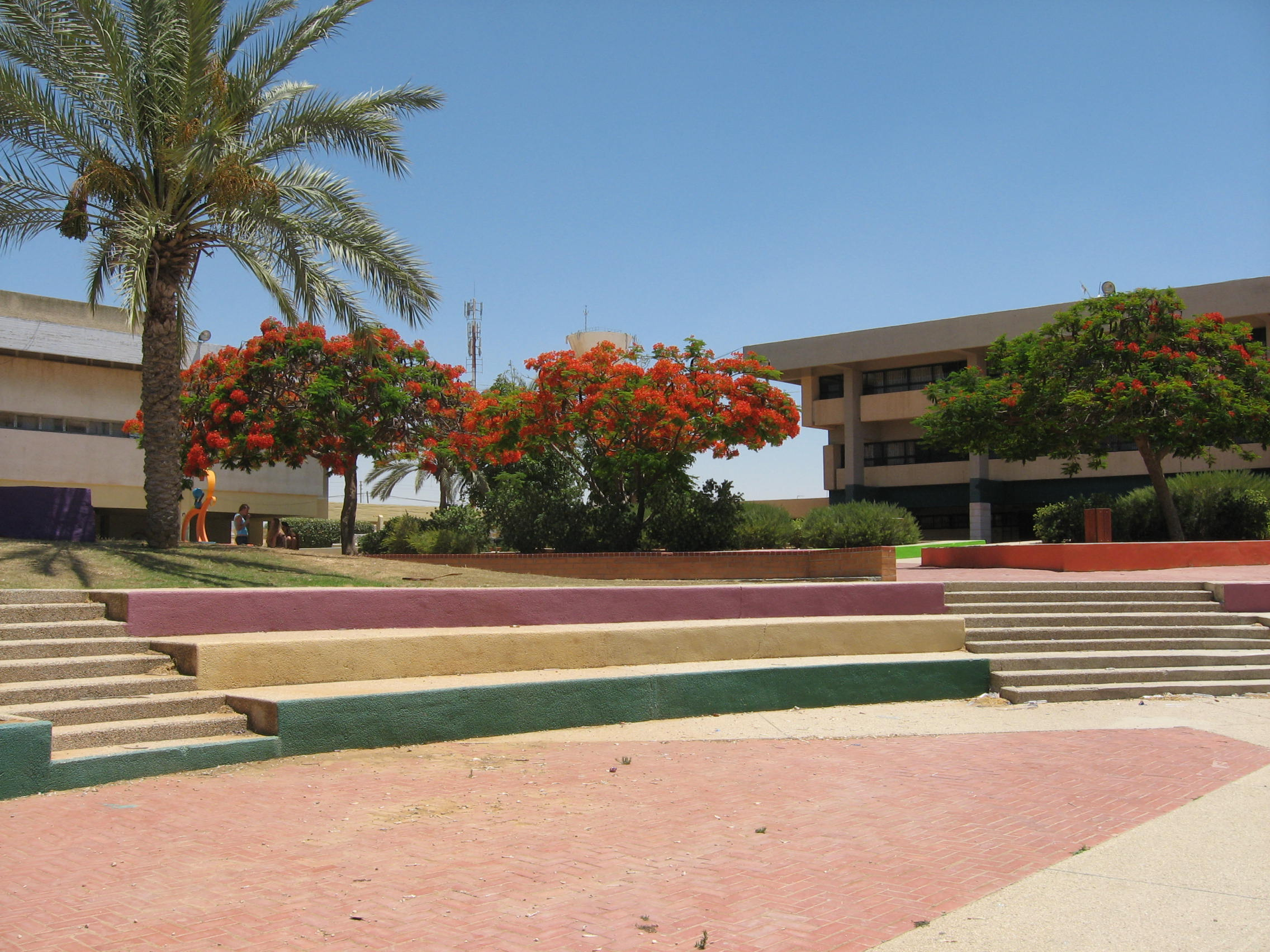
School in Ofakim

In 2001, there were 21 schools and 4,704 students in the city – 13 elementary schools (3,079 students), and 8 high schools (1,625 students). 43.3% of 12th grade students were entitled to a matriculation certificate.

== Economy ==
In 2013, about 40% of Ofakim's residents worked in the city. There were about 20 factories in Ofakim on 2,000 dunams of land. Some residents also work in high-tech.

== Transportation ==
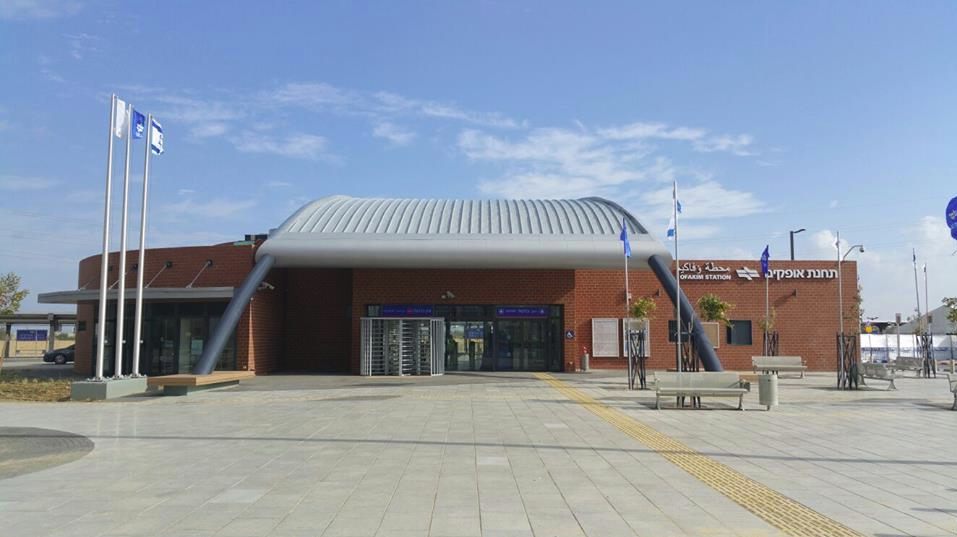
Ofakim railway station

Ofakim is accessible by Highway 25 and Route 241. Ofakim is connected to the Trans-Israel Highway via Highway 264.

The Ashkelon–Beersheba railway, a new railway line which connected Ofakim with Tel Aviv and Beersheba, was inaugurated in August 2015, which finally connected the railway line between Ashkelon and Beersheba. The Ofakim railway station was opened on December 31, 2015. The rail line connects Ofakim to Beersheba in the Southeast, and to Ashkelon and beyond to Greater Tel Aviv in the Northwest.

== Sports ==
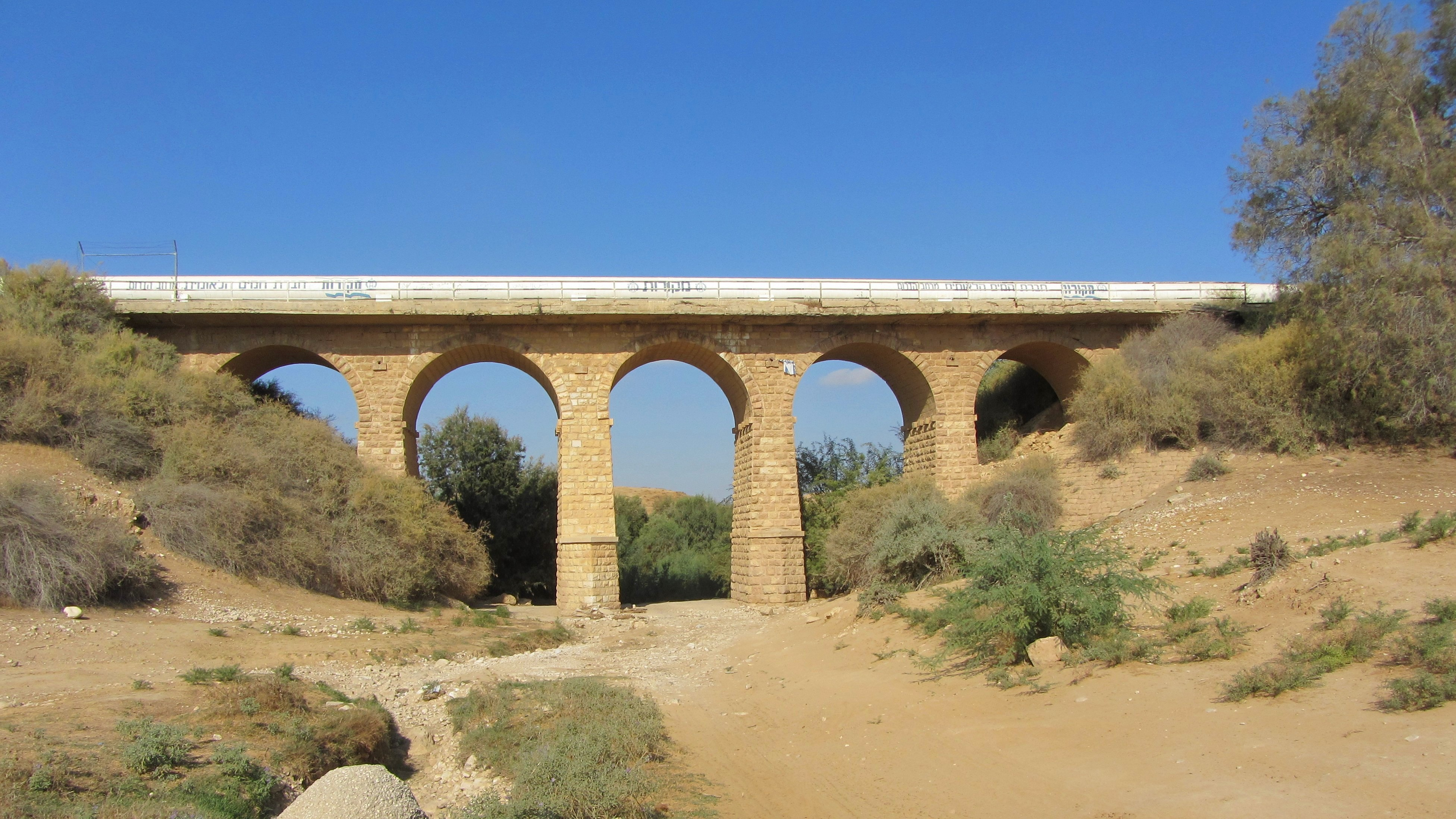
Patish bridge

One of Israel's 14 tennis centers is located in Ofakim. It opened in 1990 and has six courts.

The city also has a soccer stadium. The Nahal Shomriya cycling route around Ofakim was inaugurated in 2010. The 60-centimeter-wide single route winds through 1,500 dunams (approx 375 acres) in Ofakim Forest, passing through Nahal Shomriya and Nahal Patish, and looping around eight local moshavim.

== Urban development plans ==
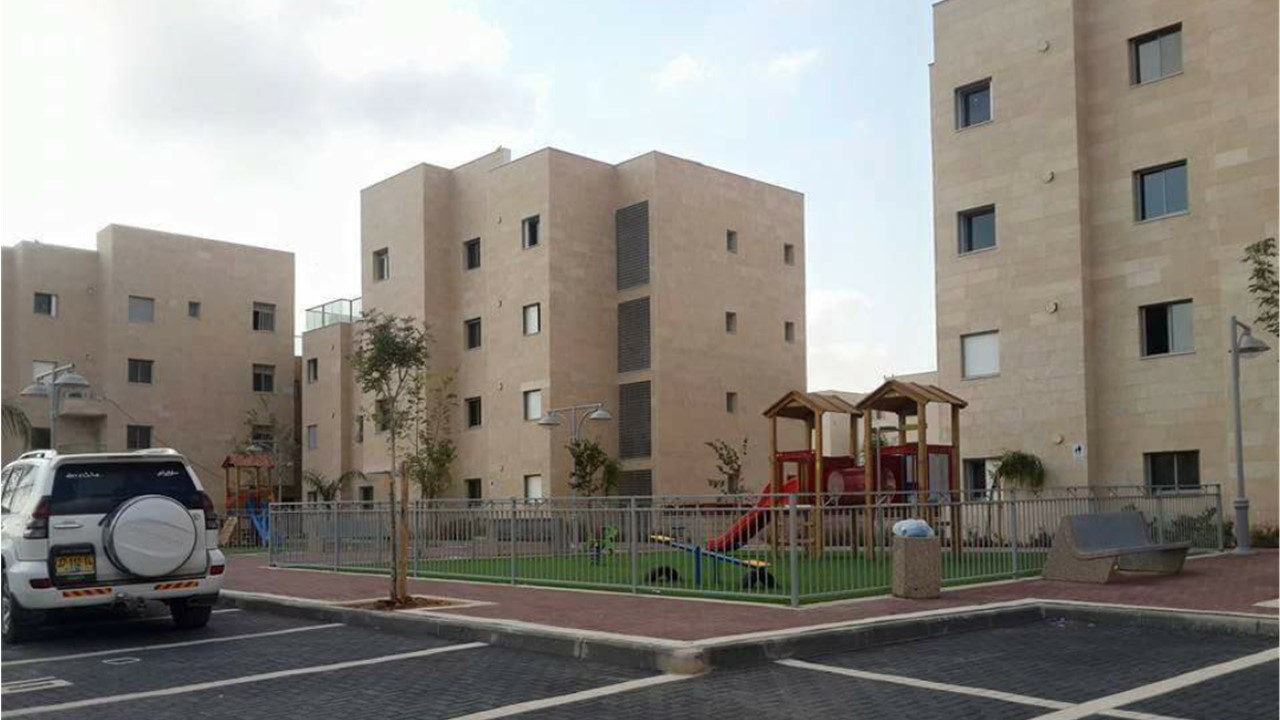
Ramat Shaked neighborhood

The city has begun to develop from 2015 onward after years of stagnation. Thousands of new housing units, commercial and employment centers, and a youth center which included a cinema were built. Ofakim Railway Station was completed in December 2015 with a car park for 1,000 cars. Next to the train station, a new neighborhood specially designed to have affordable prices for young people, is being built as part of the "Noah Initiative", which was started by activists from Tel Aviv.

In 2017, a new agreement was signed to build 14,436 housing units in four new neighborhoods and one established neighborhood, which will greatly increase the city's population. In addition, the agreement stipulated the development of an industrial zone in southern Ofakim, increased funding for infrastructure and urban renewal projects, and the construction of a new road between Ofakim and Ramon Airport. The plan aims to double the city's population. High-rise construction of buildings up to 13 stories is also planned.

== Voting Patterns ==
In the 2022 election, 86 percent of voters in Ofakim voted for the parties of the right-wing coalition led by Benjamin Netanyahu, while 12 percent voted for the parties of the center-left coalition led by Yair Lapid and 0.2 percent voted for the Arab parties.

In the 2026 election, 81 percent of voters in Ofakim voted for the parties of the right-wing coalition led by Benjamin Netanyahu, while 14 percent voted for the parties of the center-left coalition led by Gadi Eisenkot and 0.3 percent voted for the Arab parties. An additional 2.8 percent voted for the Reservists, and 1.4 percent voted for Amcha Yisrael. Voter turnout increased 26 percent from the 2022 election.

== Notable people ==
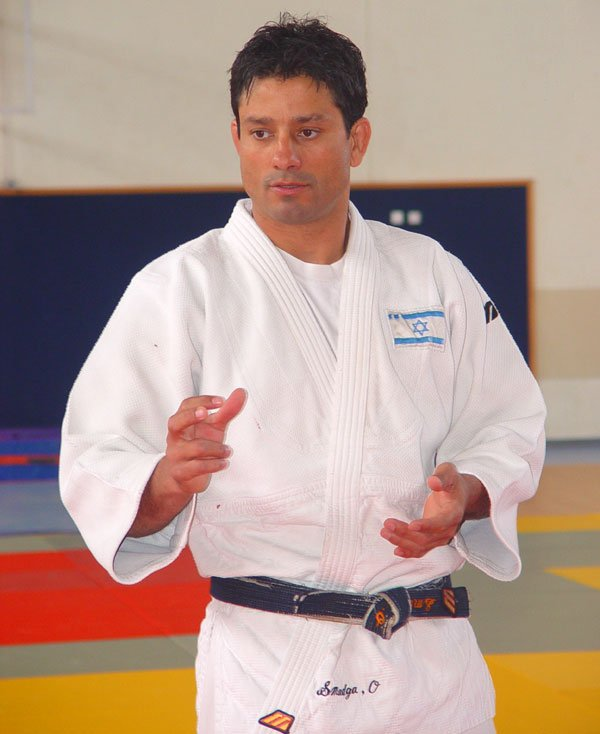
Oren Smadja

- Shimshon Dovid Pincus (1944–2001), rabbi
- Oren Smadja (born 1970), Olympic judoka
- Robert Tiviaev (born 1961), former Knesset member

== Bibliography ==
- Conder, C. R.; Kitchener, H. H. (1883). The Survey of Western Palestine: Memoirs of the Topography, Orography, Hydrography, and Archaeology. Vol. 3. London: Committee of the Palestine Exploration Fund.
- Dauphin, C. (1998). La Palestine byzantine, Peuplement et Populations. BAR International Series 726 (in French). Vol. III : Catalogue. Oxford: Archeopress. ISBN 0-860549-05-4.
- Guérin, V. (1869). Description Géographique Historique et Archéologique de la Palestine (in French). Vol. 1: Judee, pt. 2. Paris: L'Imprimerie Nationale.
- Palmer, E.H. (1881). The Survey of Western Palestine: Arabic and English Name Lists Collected During the Survey by Lieutenants Conder and Kitchener, R. E. Transliterated and Explained by E.H. Palmer. Committee of the Palestine Exploration Fund.
- Petersen, Andrew (2001). A Gazetteer of Buildings in Muslim Palestine (British Academy Monographs in Archaeology). Vol. 1. Oxford University Press. ISBN 978-0-19-727011-0.
