= Sderot =

Sderot: שְׂדֵרוֹת; سديروت
- City (from 1996)

Hebrew transcription(s)
  - ISO 259: Śderot
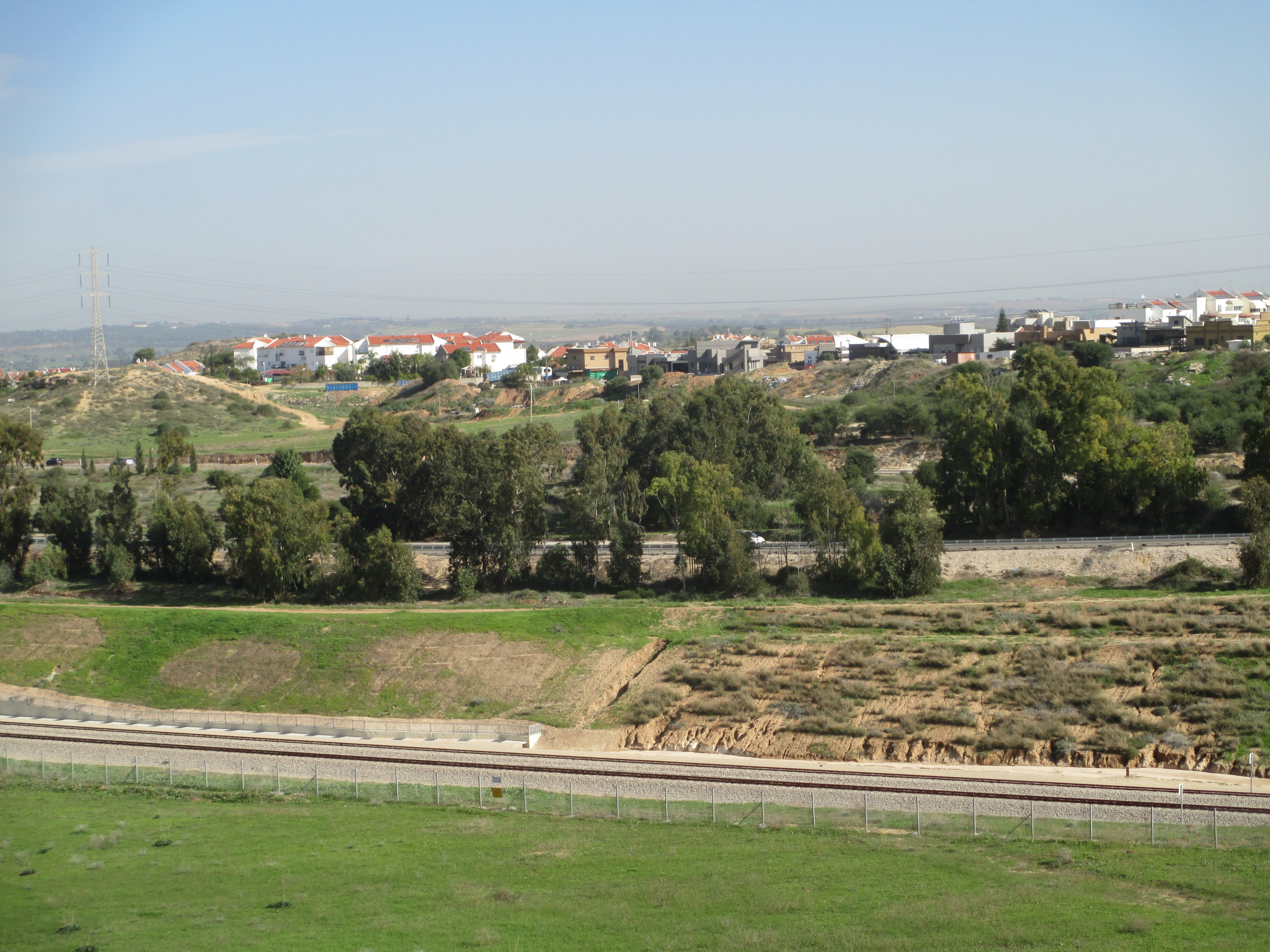

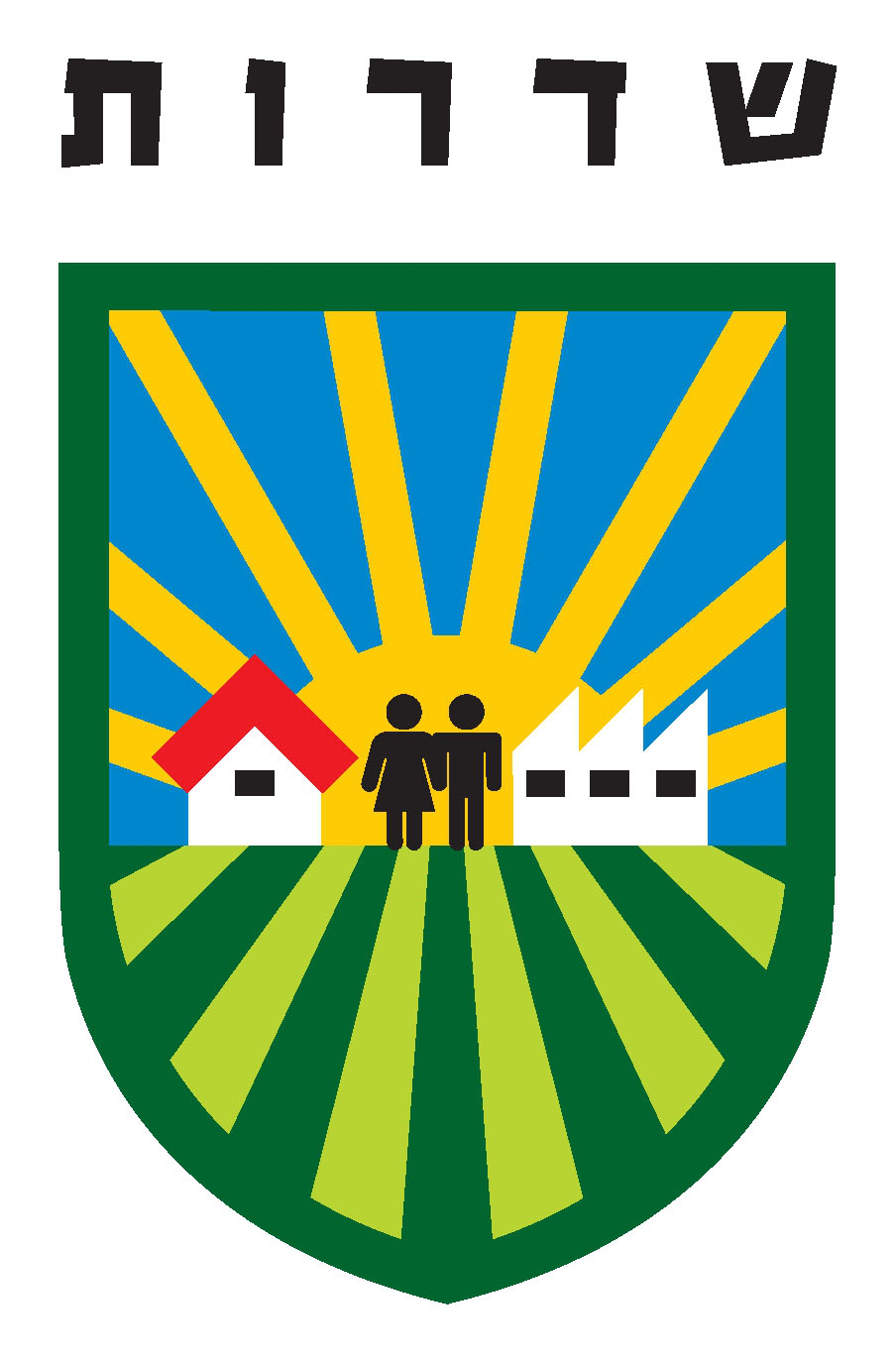

- Location within Northwest Negev region of Israel Location within Israel
- Coordinates: 31°31′22″N 34°35′43″E
- Country: Israel
- District: Southern
- Subdistrict: Ashkelon
- Natural Region: Ashkelon
- Founded: 1951

Government
  - Mayor: Alon Davidi

Area
  - Total: 4,472 dunams (4.472 km^{2}; 1.727 sq mi)

Population (2024)
  - Total: 37,239
  - Density: 8,327/km^{2} (21,570/sq mi)
- Name meaning: Boulevards/avenues

Sderot (Hebrew: שְׂדֵרוֹת, pronounced [sdeˈʁot], lit. 'boulevards'; Arabic: سديروت, sometimes Romanized as "Sederot") is a western Negev city and former development town in the Southern District of Israel. In 2024, it had a population of 37,239.

Sderot is located less than a mile from Gaza (the closest point is 840 m (2,760 ft)), and is notable for having been a major target of Qassam rocket attacks from the Gaza Strip. Between 2001 and 2008, rocket attacks on the city killed 13 people, wounded dozens, caused millions of dollars in damage and profoundly disrupted daily life. Although rocket fire subsided after the Gaza War (2008–09), the city has come under rocket attack on occasion since that time.

In 2024, Sderot was chosen to serve as a model for Israeli cities in the implementation of urban forestry ideas.

== Geography ==
Sderot lies 1 kilometre (0.62 miles) from the Gaza Strip and the town of Beit Hanoun.

== History ==
=== 20th century ===
The Israeli Negev Brigade had depopulated the area on which Sderot would be built on between 2 May and 13 May 1948, during the 1948 Arab–Israeli War, expelling the 422 Muslim farmers there who cultivated citrus, bananas and cereals from the Palestinian village of Najd. The latter were relocated in Gaza as refugees.

Sderot was founded in 1951 as a transit camp for Jewish immigrants, primarily from Kurdistan and Iran. The settlement initially housed 80 families and was originally called Gabim Dorot, before later being renamed Sderot, a symbolic nod to the numerous avenues of trees planted in the Negev to combat desertification and beautify the arid landscape. Like many localities in the Negev, a green motif was chosen in keeping with the Zionist vision of "making the desert bloom."

The development served as part of a chain of settlements designed to block infiltration from Gaza. Permanent housing was completed three years later, in 1954.

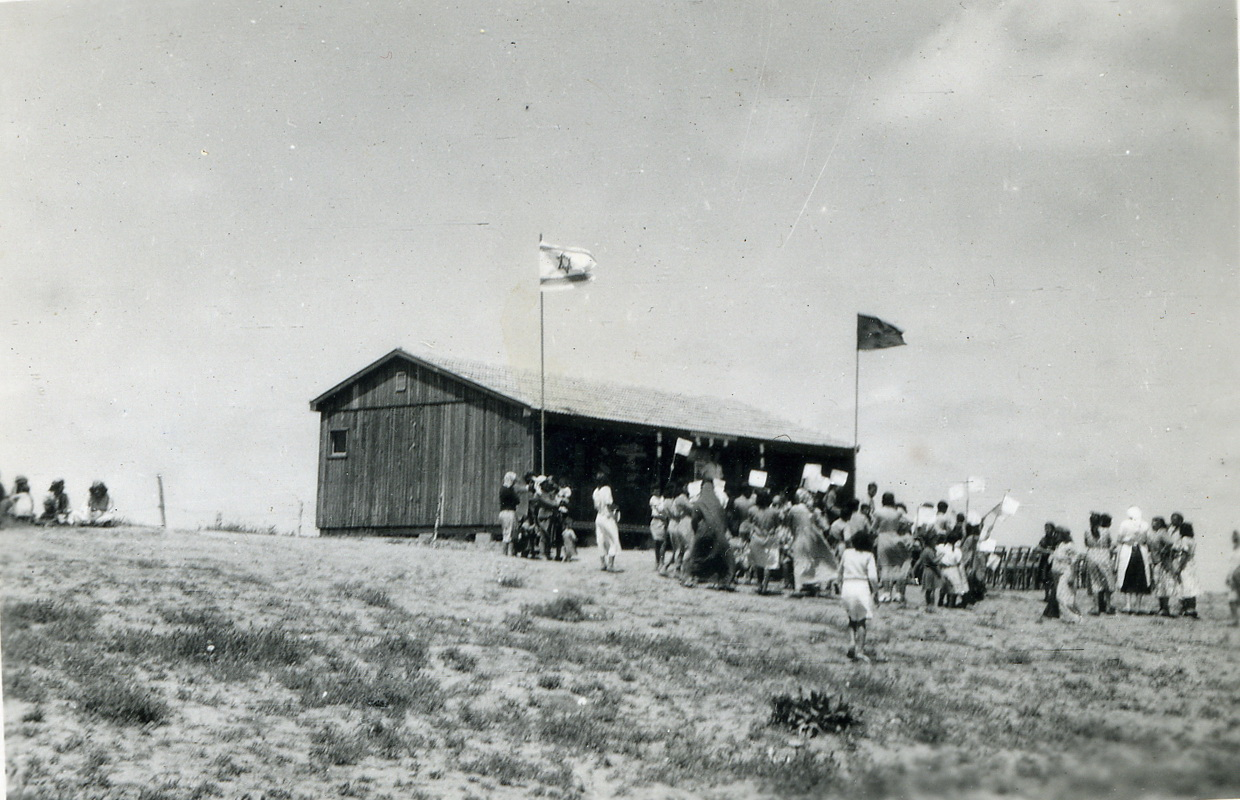
School in Sderot, early 1950s

From the mid-1950s, the town attracted many Moroccan Jews. Romanian Jewish immigrants also began settling in Sderot. In 1956, Sderot was recognized as a local council. In the 1961 census, North African immigrants, mostly from Morocco, made up 87% of the population, with 11% from Kurdistan.

Sderot absorbed another large wave of immigrants from the former Soviet Union during the 1990s post-Soviet aliyah. Immigrants from Ethiopia also arrived during this time, doubling its population. In 1996, it was declared a city. A number of Palestinians from the Gaza Strip were resettled in Sderot beginning in 1997 after cooperating with the Shin Bet.

=== 21st century ===
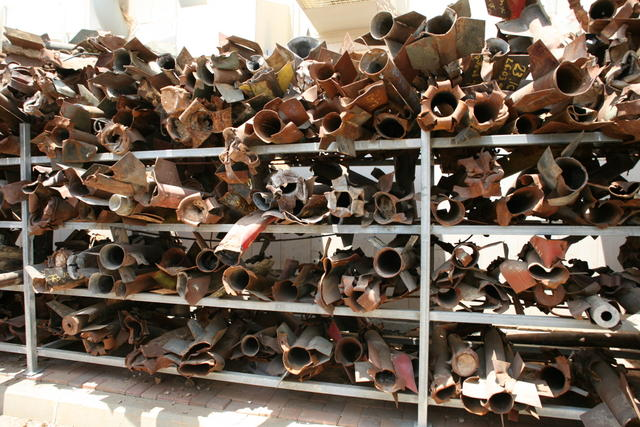
The remnants of Qassam rockets fired on Sderot

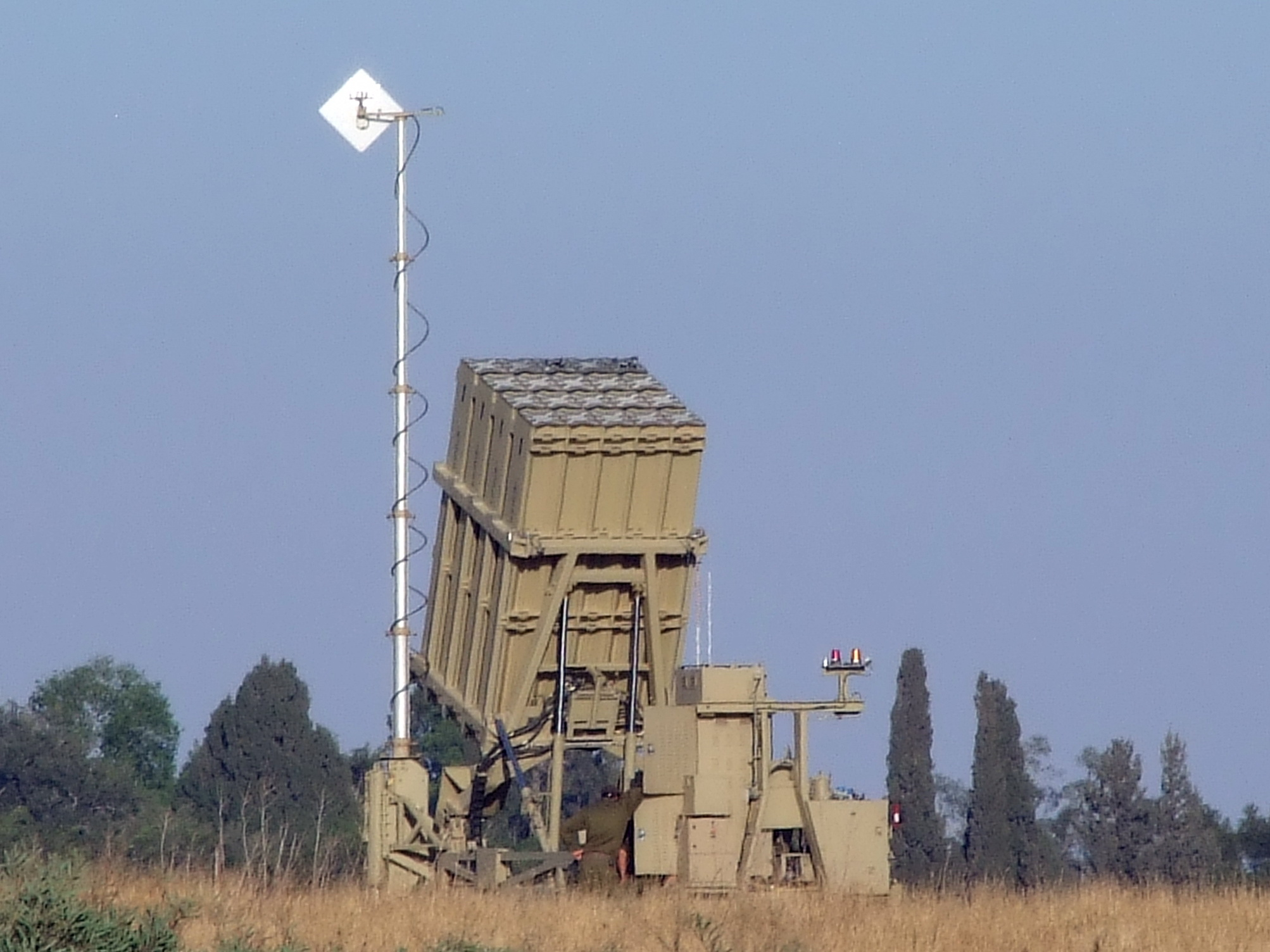
Iron Dome rocket defense battery near Sderot

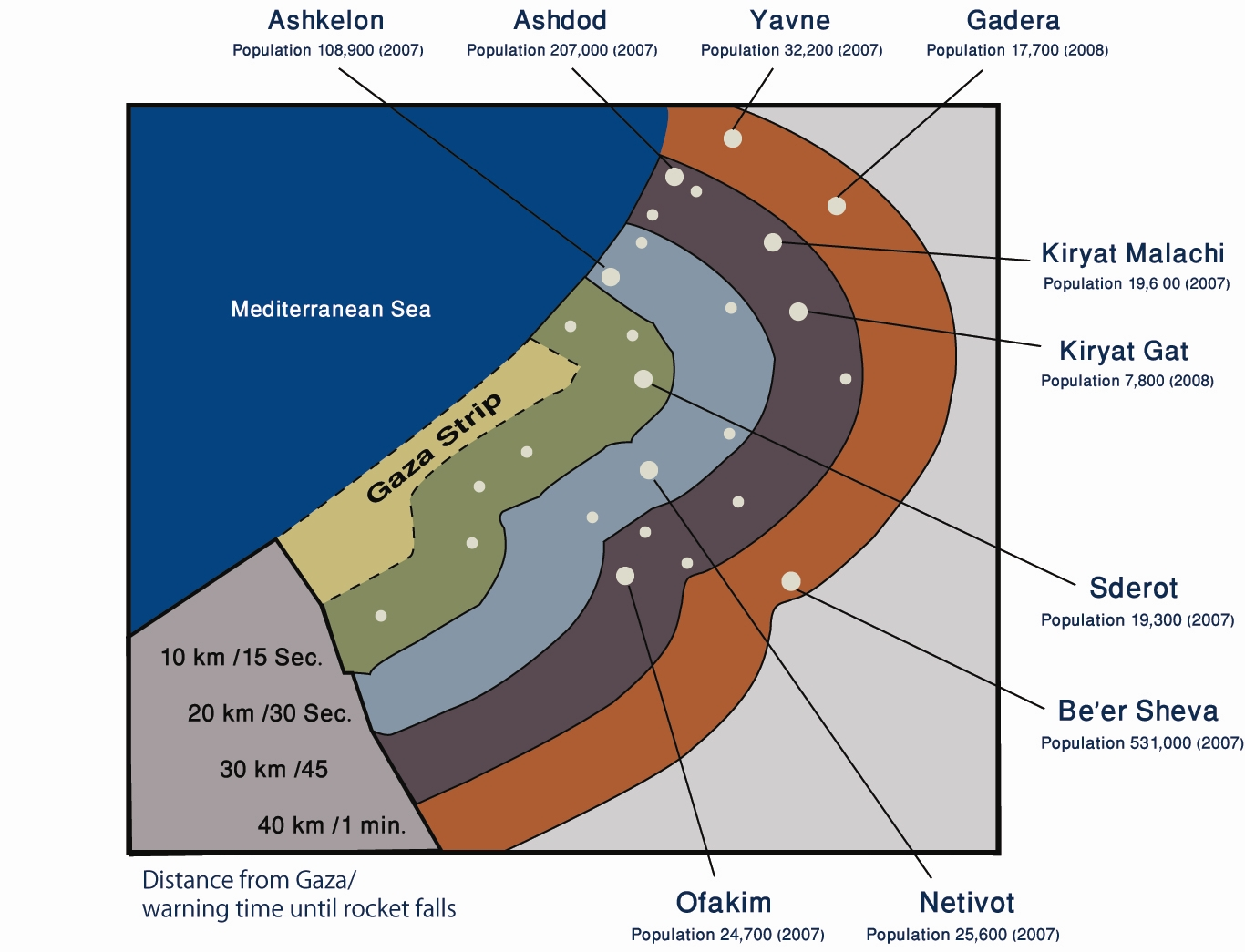
Sderot is located in the 10–15 sec of Grad rocket range

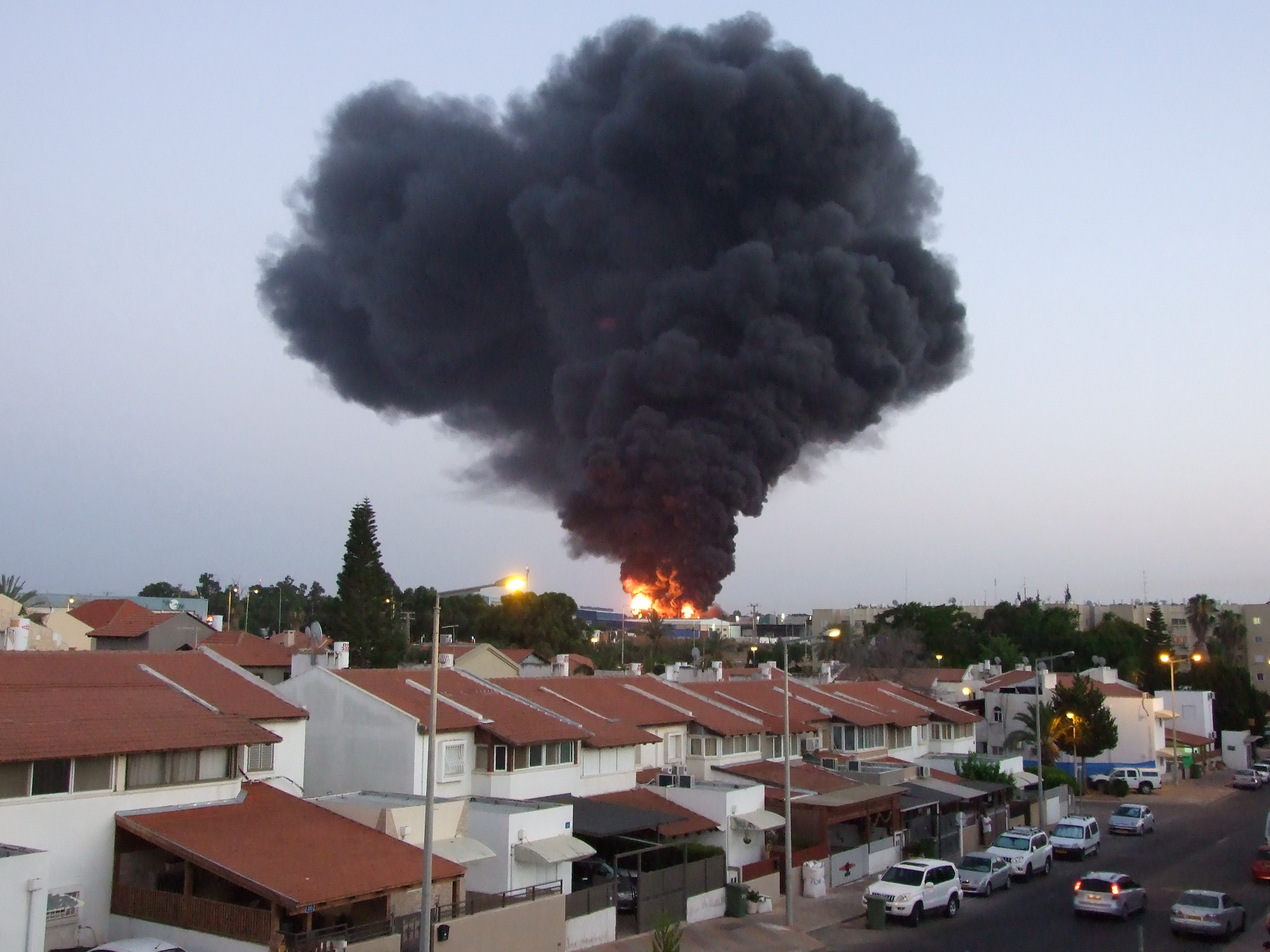
A factory burns in Sderot after a rocket attack from the Gaza Strip in June 2014

From 2001, in the beginning stage of the Second Intifada, the city was a target for rockets from the Gaza Strip. Rocket fire intensified after the Israeli disengagement from Gaza in 2005, with the city sustaining constant rocket fire from Qassam rockets launched by Hamas and Islamic Jihad.

In May 2007, a significant increase in shelling from Gaza prompted the temporary evacuation of thousands of residents. By November 23, 2007, 6,311 rockets had fallen on the city. Yediot Ahronoth reported that during the summer of 2007, 3,000 of the city's 22,000 residents (consisting mostly of the city's key upper- and middle-class residents) left for other areas, out of Qassam rocket range. Russian billionaire Arcadi Gaydamak organised a series of relief programs for residents unable to leave. On December 12, 2007, after more than 20 rockets landed in the Sderot area in a single day, including a direct hit to one of the main avenues, Sderot mayor Eli Moyal announced his resignation, citing the government's failure to halt the rocket attacks. Moyal was persuaded to retract his resignation.

In a gesture of solidarity, El Al (Israel's national airline) named one of its Boeing 777 passenger planes Sderot (4X-ECE).

In January 2008, the Jewish Community Relations Council of New York organized a display of 4,200 red balloons outside the headquarters of the United Nations. Each balloon represented a Qassam rocket that had been fired into Sderot, where for years the town and its surrounding area have been under near-constant bombardment by thousands of rockets and mortar shells fired from Gaza. Consul David Saranga, who conceptualized the display, said he used the balloons as an opportunity to call upon the international community to stop ignoring what's happening in Israel. The balloon display made headlines in New York City papers as well as international publications.

In January 2008, British journalist Seth Freedman of The Guardian described Sderot as a city of near-deserted streets and empty malls and cafes. In March 2008, the mayor said that the population had dropped by 10–15%, while aid organizations said the figure was closer to 25%. Many of the families that remained were those who could not afford to move out or were unable to sell their homes. Studies found that air raid sirens and explosions have caused severe psychological trauma in some residents. According to a study carried out at Sapir Academic College in 2007, some 75% of residents aged 4–18 were suffering from PTSD, including sleeping disorders and severe anxiety, in the wake of rocket attacks on the city, and 1,000 residents were receiving psychiatric treatment at the community mental health center. From mid-June 2007 to mid-February 2008, 771 rockets and 857 mortar bombs were fired at Sderot and the western Negev, an average of three or four each a day.

During the Gaza War in December 2008 and January 2009, between 50 and 60 rockets were fired at Sderot per week, causing about half the city's residents to temporarily evacuate. The war ended regular rocket fire from Gaza and the city experienced a revitalization. By 2009, demand for apartments was outweighing supply, a new sports complex largely funded by donor aid had opened, a new shopping mall was being built, and the assistance that the city had received due to concern over the years of rocket fire meant that Sderot now had better community, educational, and recreational services than many other Negev development towns. The city sustained rocket fire on occasion over the following years, including during Operation Protective Edge.

In 2010, after a decline in charitable donations, the municipality revealed that it was on the verge of bankruptcy.

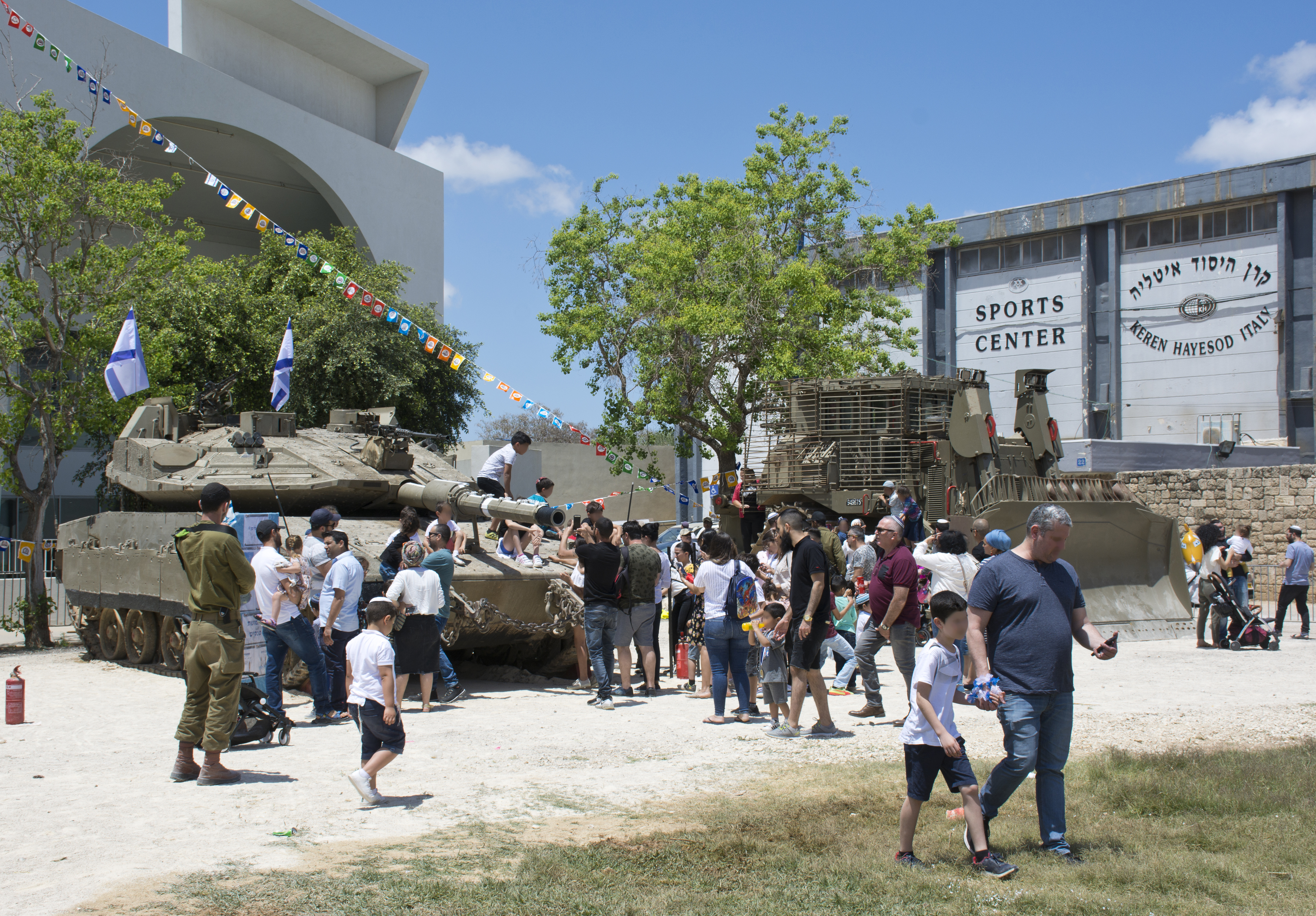
Israel Defense Forces exhibition in Sderot, 2019

In 2011, a Sderot resident filed a million dollar lawsuit against two Canadian organizations raising funds for a Canadian ship to join the Gaza Freedom Flotilla. According to the lawyers, "The Canadian Boat's raison d'être is to aid and abet the terrorist organization that rules Gaza." The suit alleges that these actions violate Canadian laws that prohibit aid to terror groups.

"Sderot cinema" is a name given to gatherings at a hill in Sderot, where over 50 locals would come to watch the bombing of the Gaza Strip during the last four wars. The name was coined by a Danish journalist who snapped a photo of it and posted it on Twitter. Similar events happened in Operation Cast Lead in 2009, after which some critics decided to refer to the hill as "Hill of Shame". Sderot residents have complained about the media portrayal.

In May 2019, the Israeli Air Force held a special flypast (aerial display) over Sderot (in addition to Yom Ha'atzmaut flypast), in order to salute the residents of Sderot who suffer continuously from Palestinian rocket attacks on Israel.

On October 7, 2023, Hamas gunmen attacked Sderot, engaging in firefights with Israeli police and civilians in the streets and occupying the town's police station. About eighteen members of the Israeli police were killed during the fighting. Fighting continued through the night until security forces retook the police station, which was demolished in case more terrorists remained inside. Early estimates stated that at least 20 civilians were killed as they were waiting at bus stops, walking down the street, and driving in their cars. Of the 36,000 residents of the city, 90% were evacuated during the days after the massacre. Most of them were housed in hotels evenly split between Eilat and the rest of the country that were paid for by the Israeli government.

As Israeli military actions in the Gaza war reduced the risk to Sderot, schools were reopened in March 2024. By April, 85% of the pre-war population had returned, subsidized by government grants to return as their initial temporary housing grants were wound down. By August 2024, 90% of the pre-war population had returned. During the war, viewing platforms on hilltops overlooking the devastation in northern Gaza once again became tourist attractions.

== Demographics ==
Historical population
Year	Pop.	±%
1972	7,600	—
1983	9,100	+19.7%
1995	16,700	+83.5%
2008	20,700	+24.0%
2022	31,108	+50.3%
2024	37,239	+19.7%

According to the Central Bureau of Statistics (CBS), in 2010 the city had a population of 21,900. The national makeup of the city was 94% Jewish, 5.5% other non-Arabs, and Arabs less than 1%. There were 10,600 males and 10,500 females. The population growth rate in 2010 was 0.5%.

== Economy ==
In 2008, the average wage for a salaried worker in Sderot was ₪5,261.

Hollandia International, founded in 1981, a company that manufactures and exports high-end mattresses, moved its sole manufacturing center to Sderot in the 1990s. After 11 years there, it decided in 2008 to relocate due to rocket attacks that hit the city and the factory.

The Osem plant in Sderot, opened in 1981, is the region's major employer, with 480 workers. 170 products are manufactured there, including Bamba, Bisli, Mana Hama instant noodle and rice dishes, instant soup powders, shkedei marak, ketchup and sauces.

The Menorah Candle factory, located in Sderot, exports Hanukkah candles all over the world.

Nestlé maintains a research and development facility in Sderot, established in 2002. Its production facilities for breakfast cereals are also located in Sderot.

Amdocs has a plant in Sderot and an industrial zone is under development.

In 2012, the government approved nearly $59 million worth of economic benefits for Sderot to strengthen the economy, boost employment, and subsidize psychosocial programs for the city's residents.

== Culture ==
An unusually high ratio of singers, instrumentalists, composers and poets have come from Sderot.

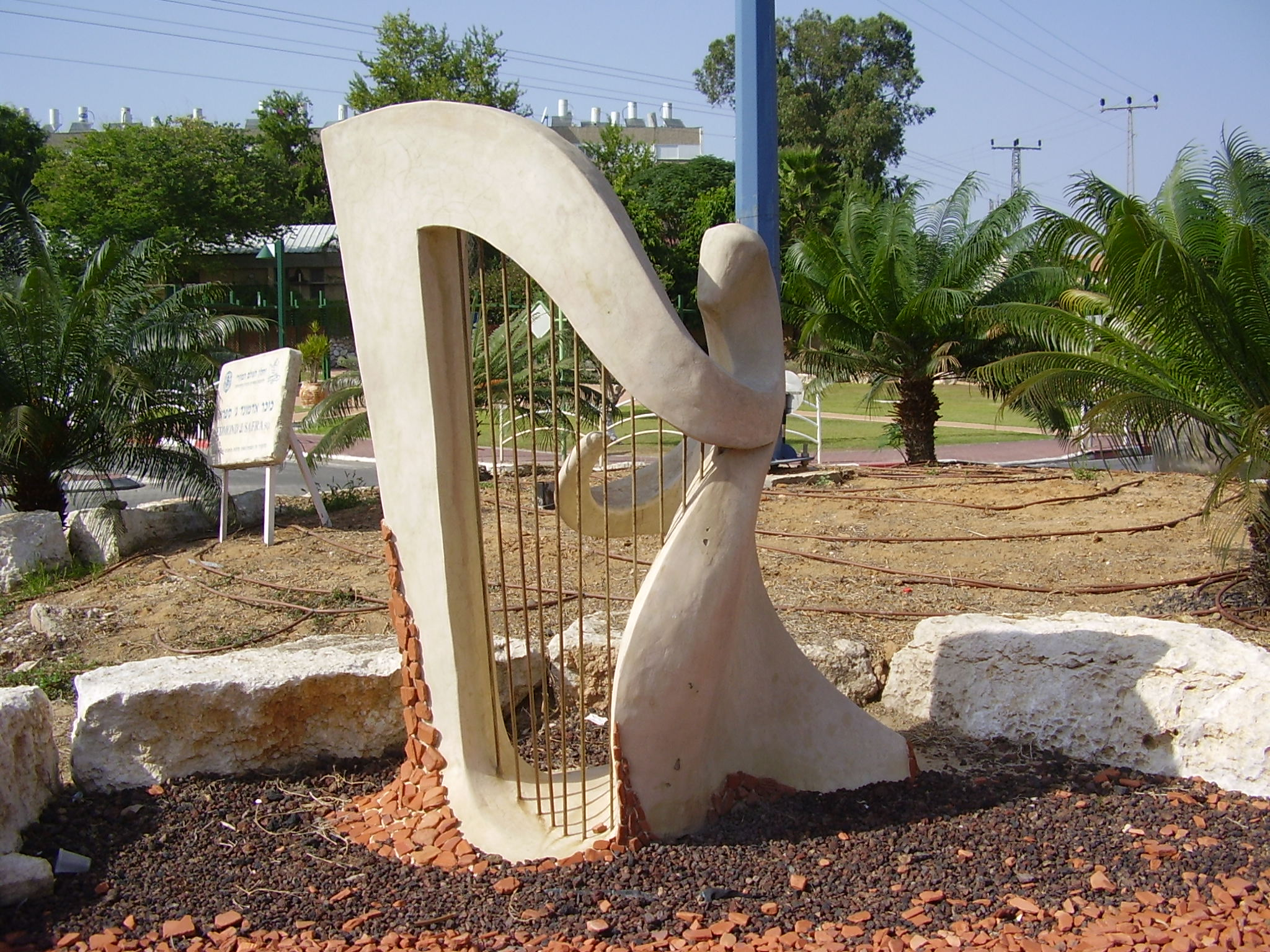
Harp sculpture, Sderot town square

Several popular bands have been formed by musicians who practiced in Sderot's bomb shelters as teenagers. As an immigrant town with high unemployment experiencing a dramatic musical success, as bands blend international sounds with the music of their Moroccan immigrant parents, it has been compared to Liverpool in the 1960s. Among the notable bands are Teapacks Knesiyat Hasekhel and Sfatayim. Well-known musicians from Sderot include Shlomo Bar, Kobi Oz, Haïm Ulliel and Smadar Levi. The winner of the Israeli version of "American Idol" 2011 was Hagit Yaso, a local Sderot singer of Ethiopian origin.

Israeli poet Shimon Adaf was born in Sderot, as well as the actor and entertainer Maor Cohen. Adaf dedicated a poem to the city in his 1997 book Icarus' Monologue.

In 2007, Jewish-American documentary filmmaker Laura Bialis immigrated to Israel, and decided to settle in Sderot "to find out what it means to live in a never-ending war, and to document the lives and music of musicians under fire". Her film Sderot: Rock in the Red Zone focuses on young musicians living under the daily threat of Qassams.

Politically, the town leans heavily to the right.

== Voting Patterns ==
In the 2022 election, 79 percent of voters in Sderot voted for the parties of the right-wing coalition led by Benjamin Netanyahu, while 19 percent voted for the parties of the center-left coalition led by Yair Lapid and 0.2 percent voted for the Arab parties.

In the 2026 election, 75 percent of voters in Sderot voted for the parties of the right-wing coalition led by Benjamin Netanyahu, while 18 percent voted for the parties of the center-left coalition led by Gadi Eisenkot and 0.2 percent voted for the Arab parties. An additional 3.3 percent voted for the Reservists, and 2.3 percent voted for Amcha Yisrael. Voter turnout increased 34 percent from the 2022 election.

== Transportation ==
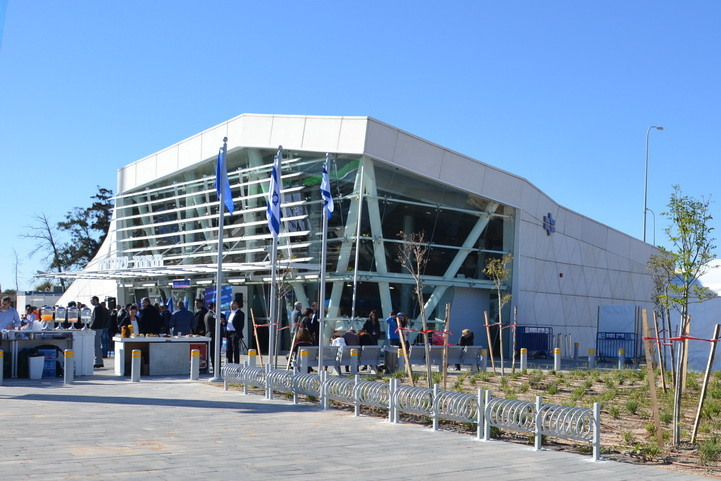
Sderot railway station

Sderot is accessible by Highway 34 and Route 232.

The Ashkelon–Beersheba railway, a new railway line that connected Sderot with Tel Aviv and Beersheba, was inaugurated in December 2013. The Sderot railway station, located on the outskirts of the city at the southern entrance, was opened on December 24, 2013. It is the first in Israel to be armored against rocket fire.

== Education ==
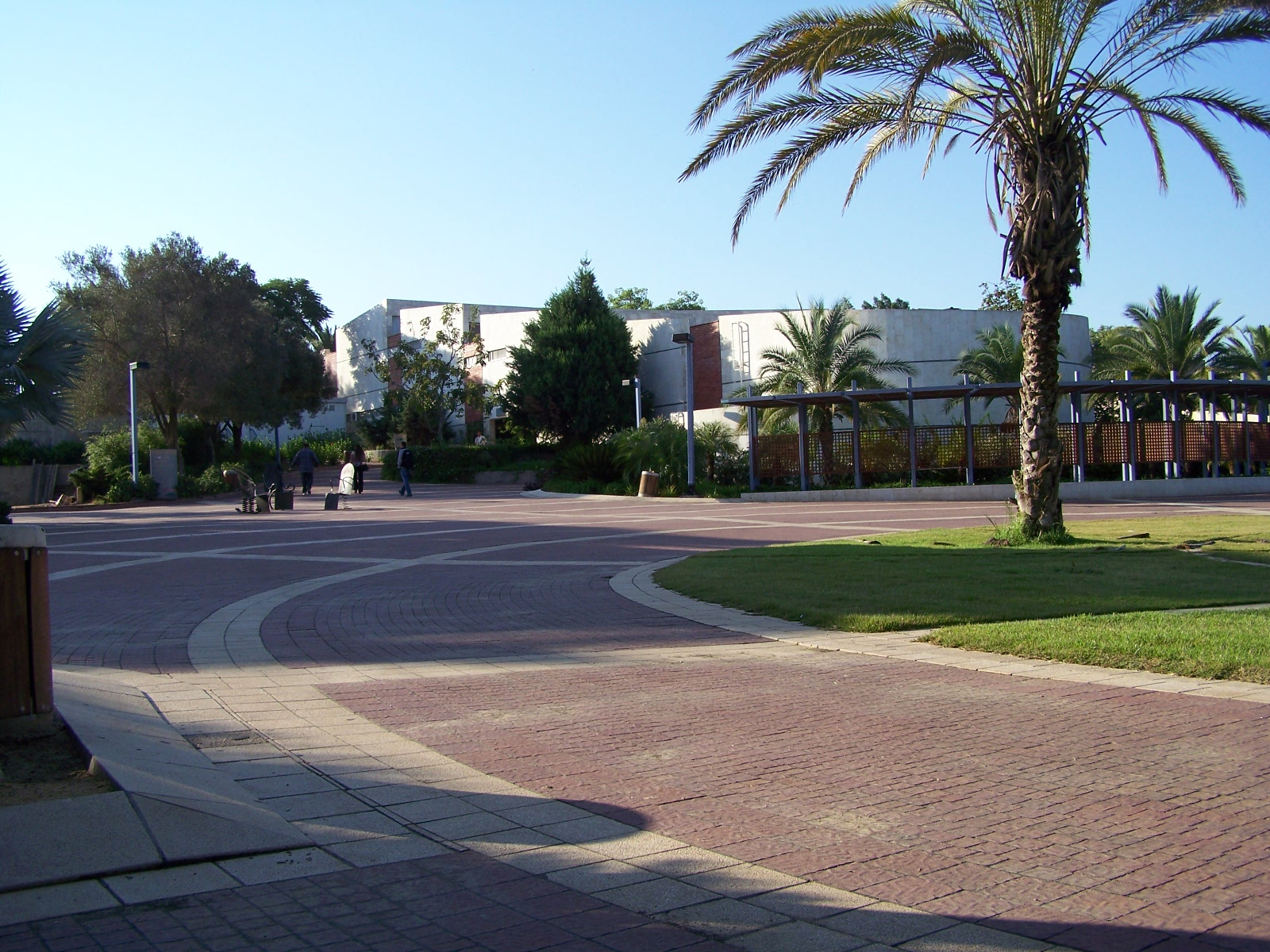
Sapir Academic College

According to CBS, there are 14 schools and 3,578 students in the city. They are spread out as eleven elementary schools and 2,099 elementary school students, and six high schools and 1,479 high school students. 56.5% of 12th grade students were entitled to a matriculation certificate in 2001. Sapir Academic College and the Hesder Yeshiva of Sderot are located in Sderot. All schools in the city and 120 bus stops have been fortified against missile attacks.

== Urban forest ==
In 2024, the city of Sderot was chosen to serve as a model for the implementation of urban forestry principles in Israel. According to Noam Bar-Levi, director of the "Derech Tzel" ("Path of Shade") organization, cities in Israel suffer from a "severe shortage of shade" and are experiencing increasing heat. The cultivation of an urban forest in Sderot will enable the city to improve residents' quality of life and cope with the effects of the climate crisis. The urban forest provides shade and reduces urban temperatures.

The project, initiated by the "Derech Tzel" association, is funded by the Nadiv Foundation and the Israeli government. The "Vontaat" organization is also participating in the initiative. The project is also referred to as "Sderot Forest City". Channel 13 reported that the initiative will lead to Sderot's streets being lined with fruit trees and vegetable gardens from which residents will be able to pick produce for their personal use.

== Twin towns – sister cities ==
Sderot is twinned with:

- Antony, France
- Zehlendorf (Berlin), Germany

== People ==
- Miri Bohadana, model
- Kim Edri, beauty queen, and former Miss Israel
- Kobi Oz, musician
- Amir Peretz, politician former defense minister
- Hagit Yaso, singer

== See also ==
- List of Israeli twin towns and sister cities
- Merkhav Mugan
- Sderot Cinematheque

== Bibliography ==
- HaReuveni, Immanuel (1999). Lexicon of the Land of Israel (in Hebrew). Yedioth Ahronoth Publishing. ISBN 965-448-413-7.
- Avi Sasson, ed. (2010). Sderot (in Hebrew). Ariel Publishing and Makom Company.
