= Haïm Ulliel =

Israeli singer (born 1956)

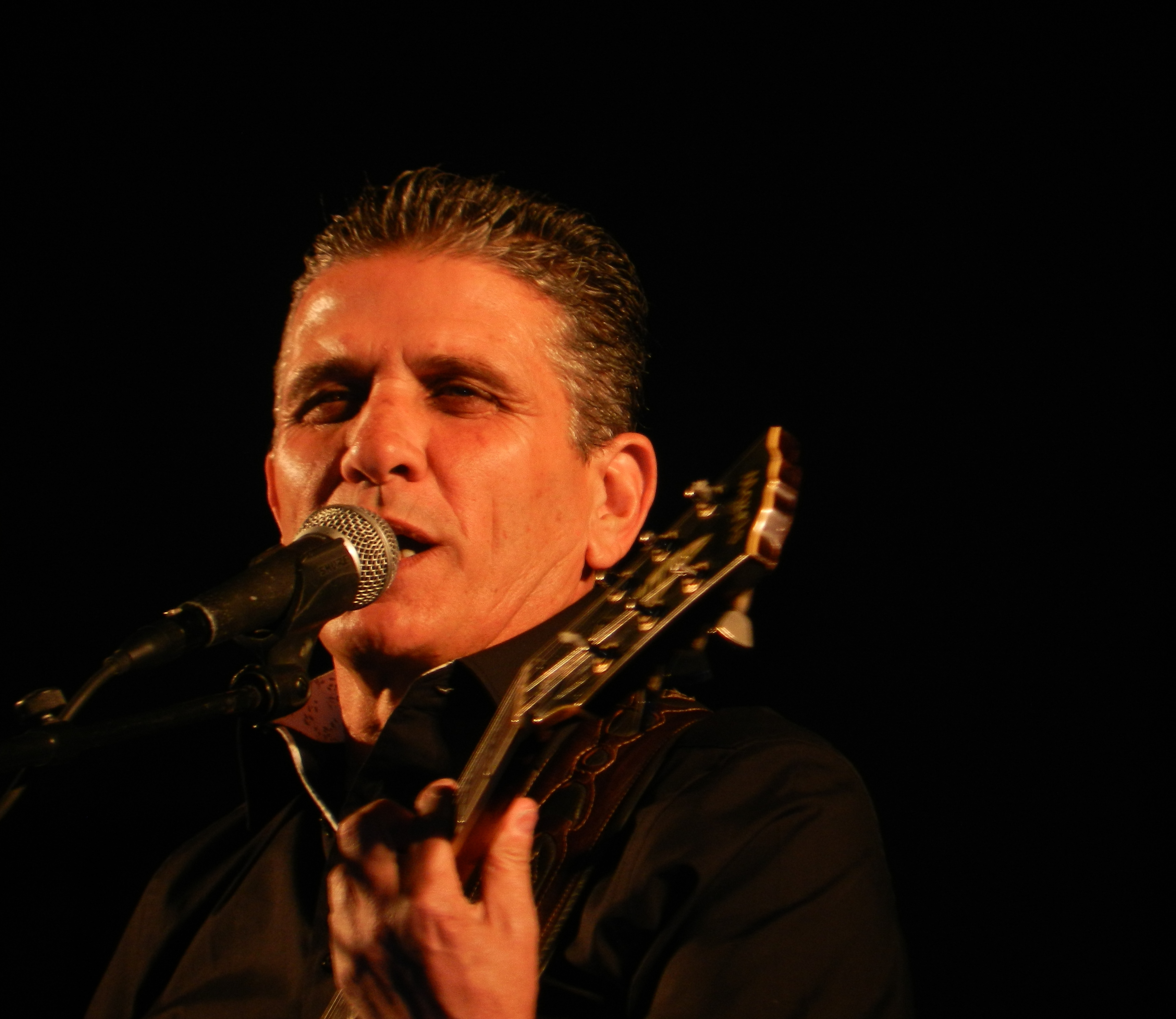
Haïm Ulliel

Haim Uliel (Hebrew: חיים אוליאל; born 22 December 1956) is an Israeli singer and musician. Uliel is part of a movement that blends traditional Moroccan music with contemporary rock.

Uliel was born in Sderot and was the leader of the band Sfatayim.

Ulliel is regarded as the central figure in the fusion of Moroccan music with contemporary rock that emerged from Sderot in the nineties.

In 2000, Uliel released his debut album Sanduk La'ajiv (Maghrebi Arabic for "magic box").

In 2024 Uliel was honored as one of the torchbearers in the national Israeli Independence Day ceremony.
