= Simsim, Gaza =

Simsim سمسم Sumsum, Semsem
- Etymology: "Sesame"
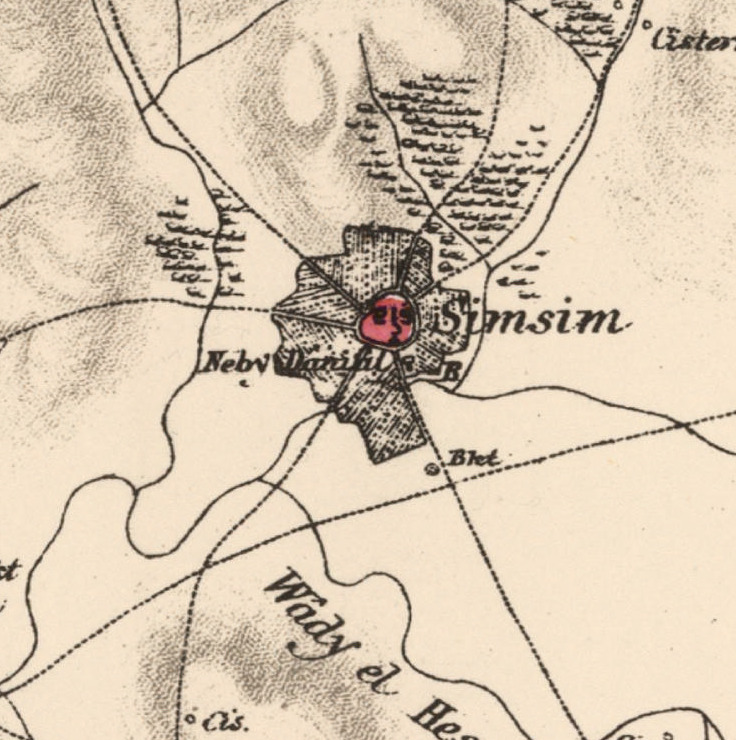
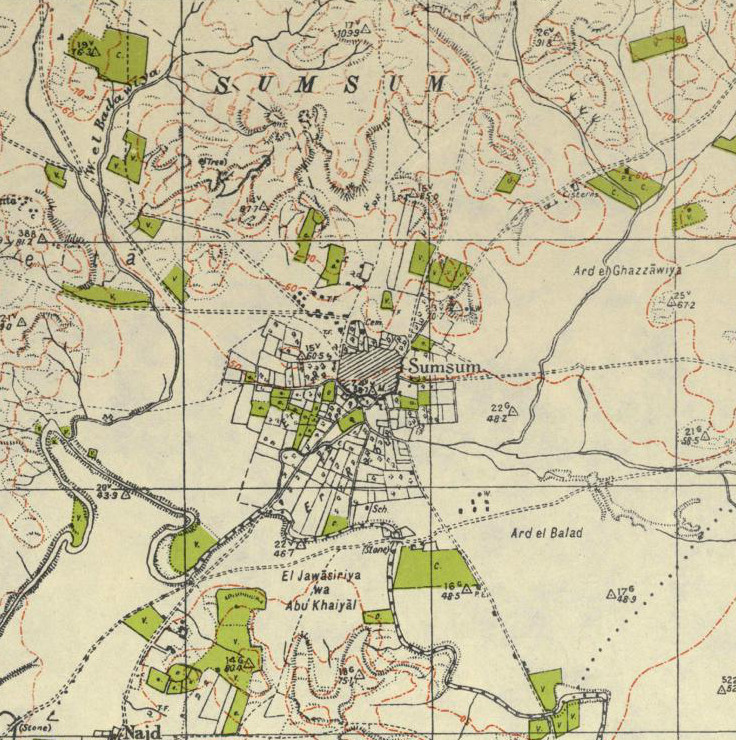
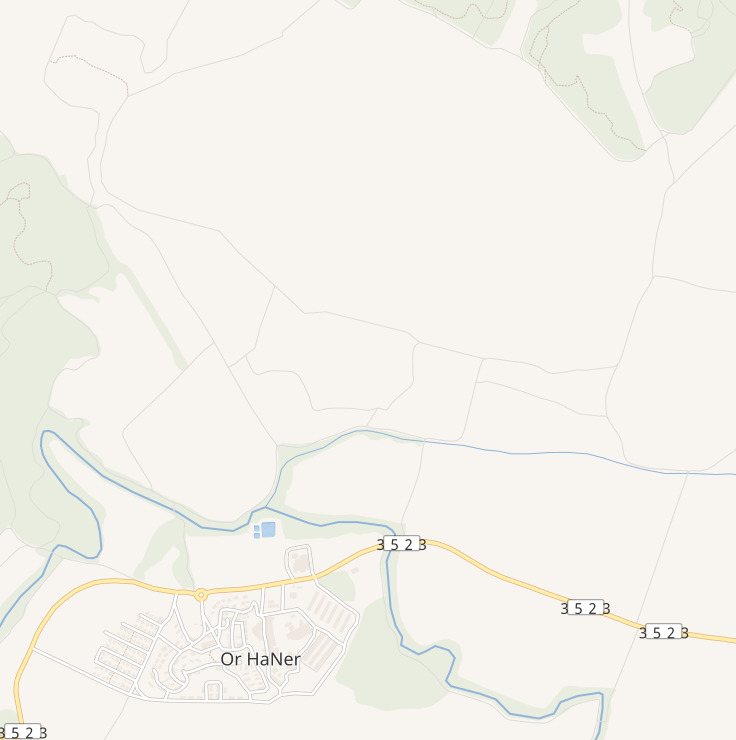
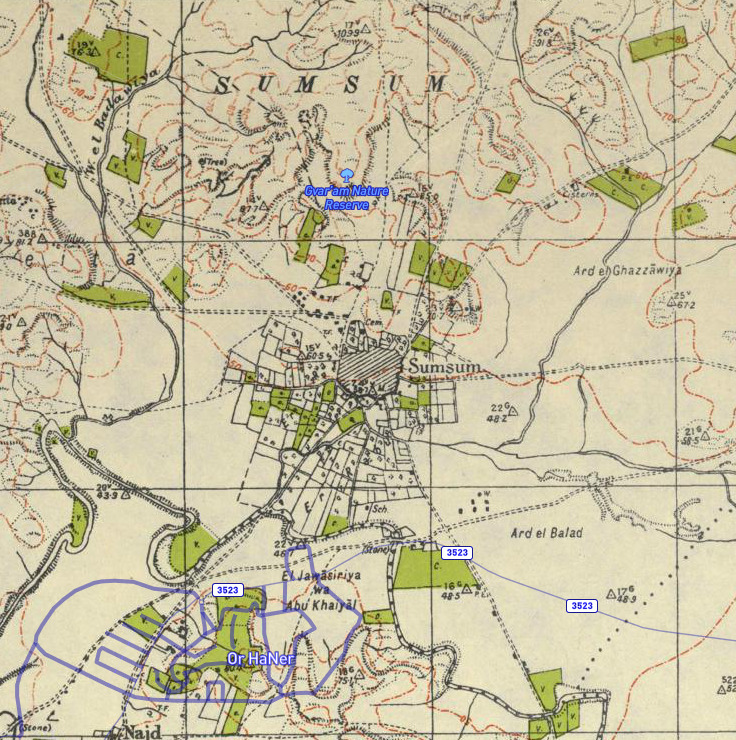
- 1870s map 1940s map modern map 1940s with modern overlay map A series of historical maps of the area around Simsim, Gaza (click the buttons)

- Location within Mandatory Palestine
- Coordinates: 31°34′02″N 34°36′26″E
- Palestine grid: 112/108
- Geopolitical entity: Mandatory Palestine
- Subdistrict: Gaza
- Date of depopulation: 12 May 1948

Area
  - Total: 16,797 dunams (16.797 km^{2}; 6.485 sq mi)

Population (1945)
  - Total: 1,290
- Cause(s) of depopulation: Expulsion by Yishuv forces
- Current Localities: Gvar'am

Simsim (Arabic: سمسم), also spelled Semsem or Sumsum, was a Palestinian village, located 15 kilometers (9.3 mi) northeast of Gaza. It was depopulated and destroyed during the 1948 Palestine war as part of the 1948 Palestinian expulsion and the Nakba.

== History ==
=== Roman to Crusader periods ===
Simsim contained two archaeological sites known locally as ar-Ras and Sha'fat al-Mughur (the latter of which contained a Roman cemetery). Byzantine ceramics have been found here. The village was known as Semsem to the Crusaders.

=== Ottoman period ===
Simsim was incorporated into the Ottoman Empire in 1517 with all of Palestine, and by 1596 it was part of the nahiya (subdistrict) of Gaza under the liwa' (district) of Sanjak of Gaza, and it had 20 Muslim households, an estimated population of 110. They paid a fixed tax rate of 33.3% on a number of crops, including wheat, barley and fruit trees, as well as on goats and beehives; a total of 6,800 Akçe. 14/24 of the revenue went to a Waqf.

During the 17th and 18th centuries, the area of Simsim experienced a significant process of settlement decline due to nomadic pressures on local communities. The residents of abandoned villages moved to surviving settlements, but the land continued to be cultivated by neighboring villages.

==== 19th century ====
In 1838, Simsim was noted as was a Muslim village in the Gaza District.

In A Handbook for Travellers in Syria and Palestine (1858), Josias Leslie Porter describes the village as standing "amidst a little grove of trees, about a 1/4 mile north of the road." In June 1863 Victor Guérin found the village to contains five hundred inhabitants. Surrounded by trees, the village had tobacco and sesame plantations. A oualy, dedicated to Neby Danyal, was internally decorated with two ancient columns. An Ottoman village list of about 1870 indicated 69 houses and a population of 119, though the population count included only men.

In 1883, the PEF's Survey of Western Palestine described Simsim as being surrounded by gardens. It had a well, a pool, and an olive grove that was planted to the north.

Karl Baedeker and his travelling companions writing in 1894 are more specific, noting that the village is located in an olive grove and that tobacco and sesame are the principal crops grown there.

=== British Mandate ===
In the 1922 census of Palestine conducted by the British Mandate authorities, Semsem had a population of 760 inhabitants, all Muslims, increasing in the 1931 census, when Sumsum had a population of 855 Muslims in 195 houses.

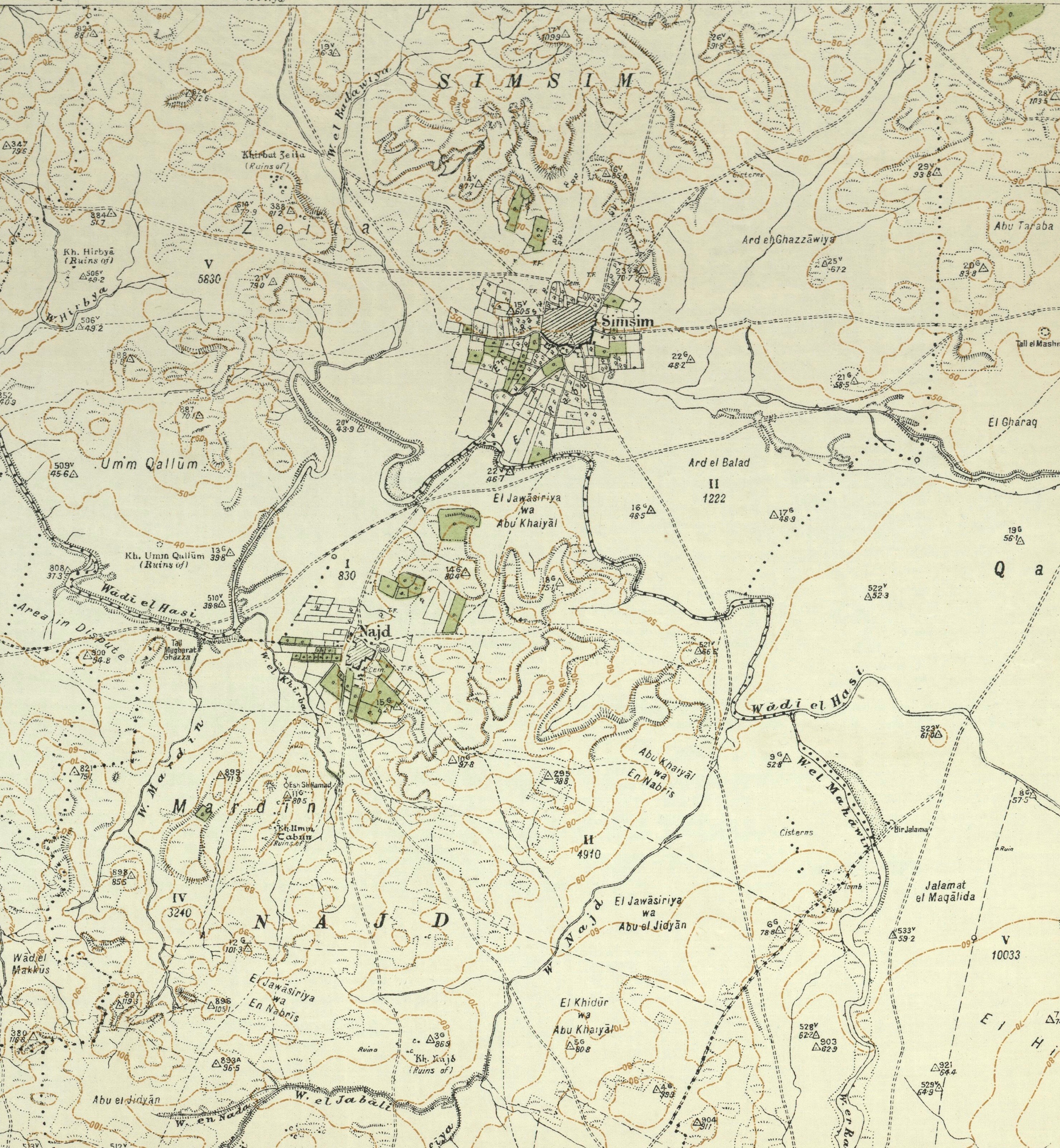
Simsim 1931 1:20,000

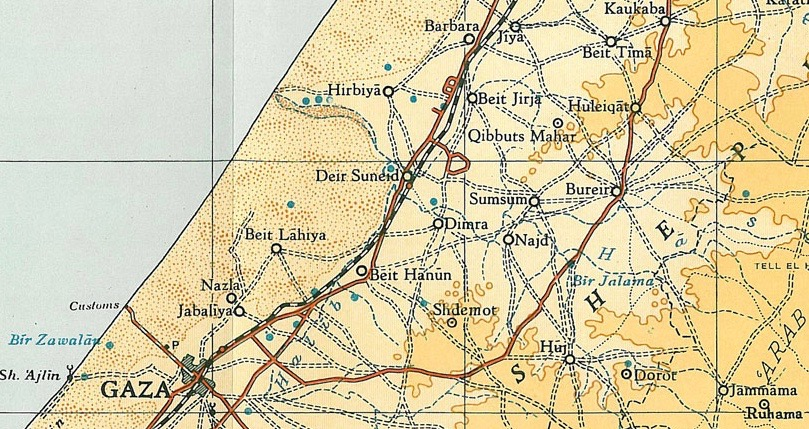
Simsim 1945 1:250,000

In 1942, the kibbutz of Gvar'am was established on land traditionally belonging to the village.

In the 1945 statistics, the population of Sumsum consisted of 1,290 Muslims and 70 Jews, while the total land area was 16,797 dunams, according to an official land and population survey. Of this, a total of 240 dunams were used citrus and bananas, 252 dunams were plantations and irrigable land, 15,582 for cereals, while 44 dunams were built-up areas.

=== 1948 war and destruction ===
During the 1948 Arab–Israeli War the villagers of Simsim, together with the surrounding villages, were driven out by soldiers from the Negev Brigade on 12–13 May 1948 as part of Operation Barak. In Simsim the occupying troops found only a handful of old people. They blew up five houses and warned that if the village's weapons were not handed over the following day, they would blow up the rest. But the inhabitants repeatedly returned to the village, either to resettle or to cultivate crops. At the end of May, a Negev Brigade unit, with orders to expel "the Arabs from Sumsum and Burayr and burn their granaries and fields", swept through the villages, encountering resistance in Sumsum, and killed "5" (or, according to another report, "20") and blew up granaries and a well. Historian Saleh Abdel Jawad writes that a massacre occurred in the village on 13 May. (Note: Saleh Abdel Jawad, 2007, Zionist Massacres: the Creation of the Palestinian Refugee Problem in the 1948 War. "13 May 1948: Sumsum: Indiscriminate killings occur. [...] The Negev Brigade is ordered to expel the remaining and returning villagers and to burn the fields and granaries. It kills five to 20 people (according to Haganah documents quoted in Morris), blows up granaries, and destroys a well. Morris uses the terms "resistance" and "skirmishes" to describe the behaviour of the Sumsum residents. The resistance was only a refusal to obey the expulsion orders and not the use of an armed force by the villagers.") The Israeli troops returned to Simsim yet again, on 9 or 10 June 1948, again burning houses and skirmishing with Arabs.

Or HaNer, established in 1957, lie less than one km south of the village site, on land formerly belonging to Najd, Gaza.

In 1992, the village's remains were described by Walid Khalidi: "The village has been obliterated and can only be recognised from the cypress and sycamore trees that still remain. A pile of stones that may be the debris of a village building is visible. The site is fenced in and serves as a pasture. The land in the vicinity are cultivated by Israeli farmers."

== People from Simsim ==
- Jamil Majdalawi

== Bibliography ==
- Baedeker, K., A. Socin and Immanuel Benzinger (1894). Palestine and Syria: Handbook for Travellers. Harvard University.
- Barron, J. B., ed. (1923). Palestine: Report and General Abstracts of the Census of 1922. Government of Palestine.
- Conder, C.R.; Kitchener, H. H. (1883). The Survey of Western Palestine: Memoirs of the Topography, Orography, Hydrography, and Archaeology. Vol. 3. London: Committee of the Palestine Exploration Fund.
- Dauphin, C. (1998). La Palestine byzantine, Peuplement et Populations. BAR International Series 726 (in French). Vol. III : Catalogue. Oxford: Archeopress. ISBN 0-860549-05-4.
- Department of Statistics (1945). Village Statistics, April, 1945. Government of Palestine.
- Guérin, V. (1869). Description Géographique Historique et Archéologique de la Palestine (in French). Vol. 1: Judee, pt. 2. Paris: L'Imprimerie Nationale.
- Hadawi, S. (1970). Village Statistics of 1945: A Classification of Land and Area ownership in Palestine. Palestine Liberation Organization Research Center.
- Hartmann, M. (1883). "Die Ortschaftenliste des Liwa Jerusalem in dem türkischen Staatskalender für Syrien auf das Jahr 1288 der Flucht (1871)". Zeitschrift des Deutschen Palästina-Vereins. 6: 102–149.
- Hütteroth, W.-D.; Abdulfattah, K. (1977). Historical Geography of Palestine, Transjordan and Southern Syria in the Late 16th Century. Erlanger Geographische Arbeiten, Sonderband 5. Erlangen, Germany: Vorstand der Fränkischen Geographischen Gesellschaft. ISBN 3-920405-41-2.
- Khalidi, W. (1992). All That Remains: The Palestinian Villages Occupied and Depopulated by Israel in 1948. Washington D.C.: Institute for Palestine Studies. ISBN 0-88728-224-5.
- Mills, E., ed. (1932). Census of Palestine 1931. Population of Villages, Towns and Administrative Areas. Jerusalem: Government of Palestine.
- Morris, B. (2004). The Birth of the Palestinian Refugee Problem Revisited. Cambridge University Press. ISBN 978-0-521-00967-6.
- Palmer, E. H. (1881). The Survey of Western Palestine: Arabic and English Name Lists Collected During the Survey by Lieutenants Conder and Kitchener, R. E. Transliterated and Explained by E.H. Palmer. Committee of the Palestine Exploration Fund.
- Porter, J.L., (1858). A Handbook for Travellers in Syria and Palestine. Harvard University.
- Robinson, E.; Smith, E. (1841). Biblical Researches in Palestine, Mount Sinai and Arabia Petraea: A Journal of Travels in the year 1838. Vol. 2. Boston: Crocker & Brewster.
- Robinson, E.; Smith, E. (1841). Biblical Researches in Palestine, Mount Sinai and Arabia Petraea: A Journal of Travels in the year 1838. Vol. 3. Boston: Crocker & Brewster.
- Socin, A. (1879). "Alphabetisches Verzeichniss von Ortschaften des Paschalik Jerusalem". Zeitschrift des Deutschen Palästina-Vereins. 2: 135–163.
