= Al-Batani al-Gharbi =

Arab village in Mandatory Palestine

Al-Batani al-Gharbi البطاني الغربي
- Etymology: The western Butani
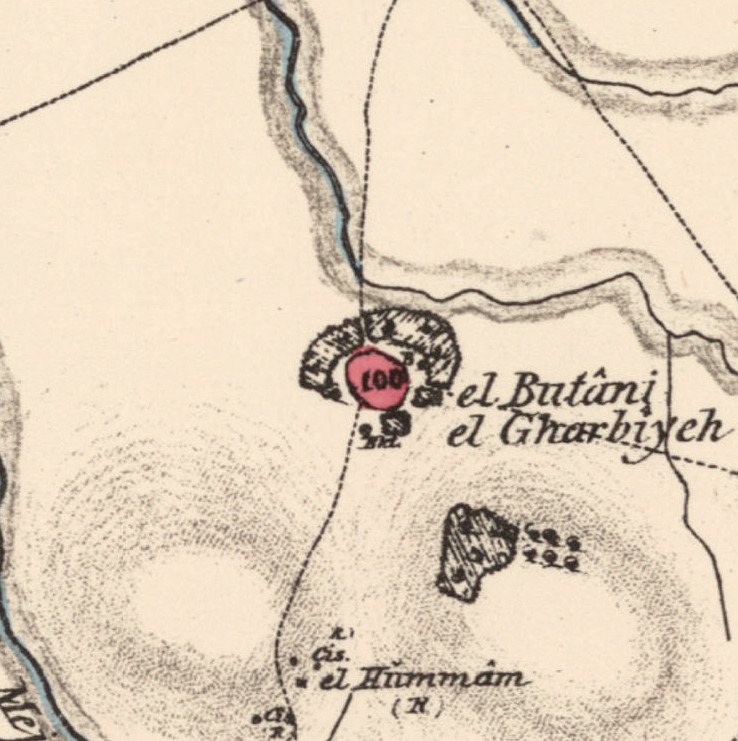
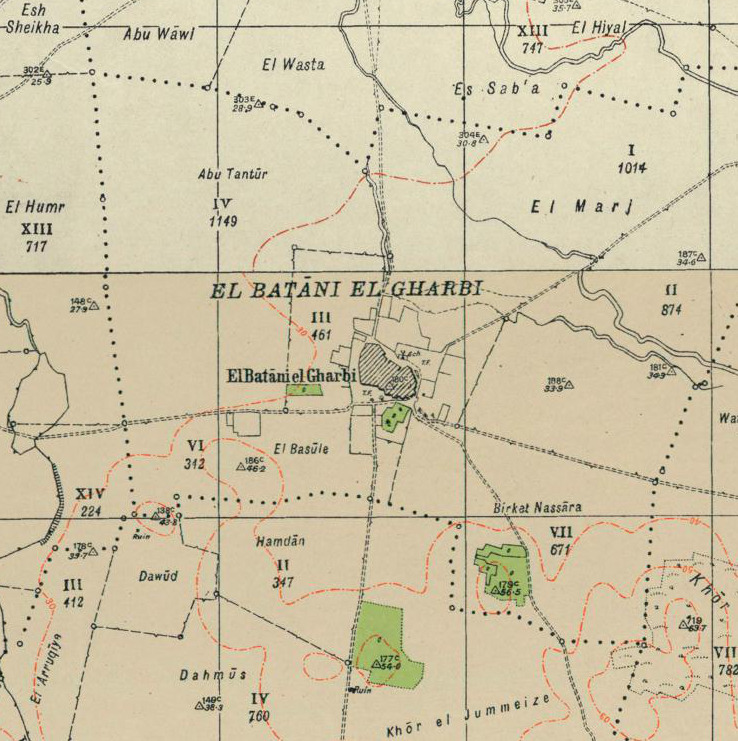
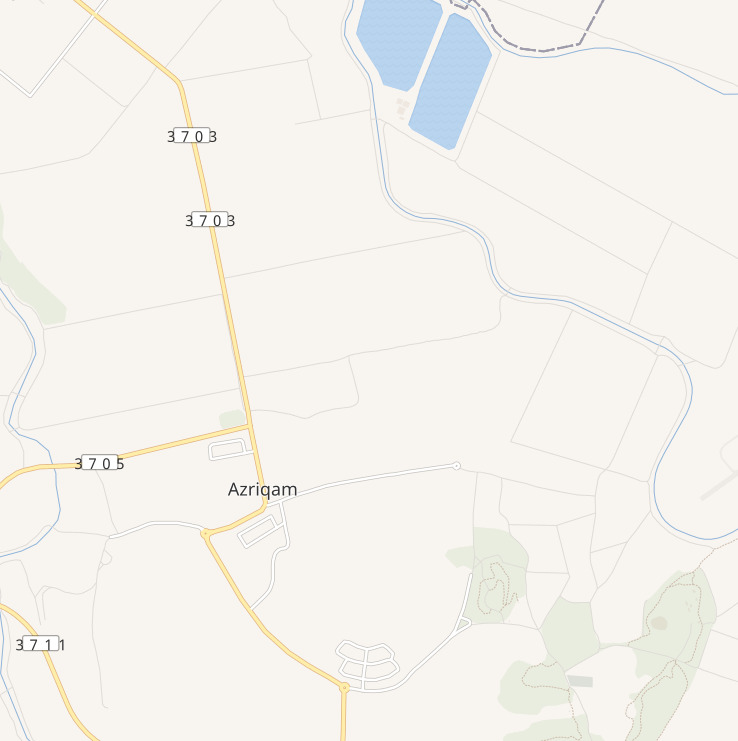
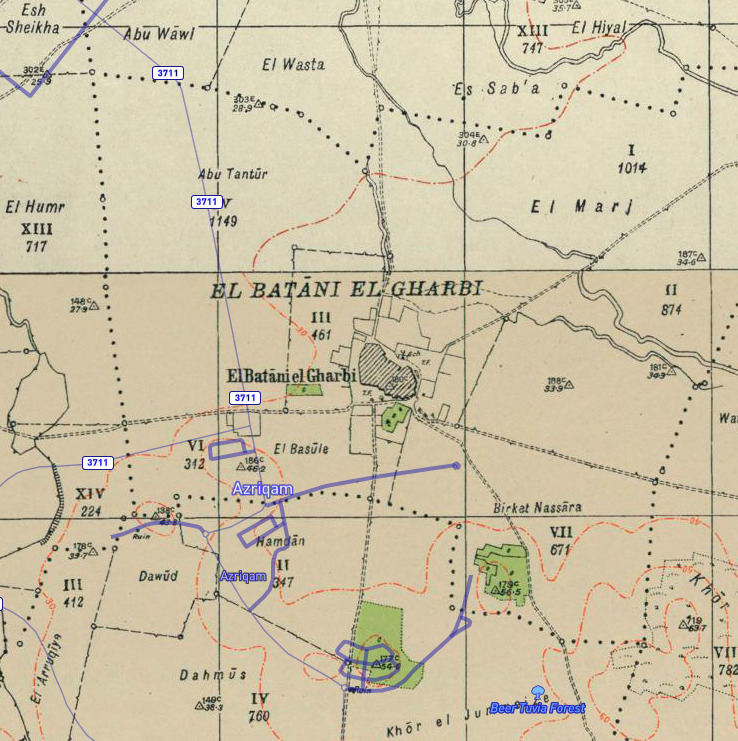
- 1870s map 1940s map modern map 1940s with modern overlay map A series of historical maps of the area around Al-Batani al-Gharbi (click the buttons)

- Location within Mandatory Palestine
- Coordinates: 31°45′29″N 34°41′58″E
- Palestine grid: 121/129
- Geopolitical entity: Mandatory Palestine
- Subdistrict: Gaza
- Date of depopulation: May 13, 1948

Area
  - Total: 4,574 dunams (4.574 km^{2}; 1.766 sq mi)

Population (1945)
  - Total: 980
- Cause(s) of depopulation: Military assault by Yishuv forces

Al-Batani al-Gharbi was a Palestinian village in the Gaza Subdistrict. It was depopulated during the 1947–48 Civil War in Mandatory Palestine on May 13, 1948, by the Giv'ati Brigade under Operation Barak. It was located 36 km (22 mi) northeast of Gaza.

== History ==
One mention of al-Batani indicates that it was founded as a ranch by the Umayyad caliph Mu'awiya I in the 8th century CE.

=== Ottoman era ===
The village appeared as an unnamed village on the map that Pierre Jacotin compiled of the area in 1799.

In 1838, Robinson noted el-Butaniyeh, the west, as Muslim village located in the Gaza district.

In 1863 the French explorer Victor Guérin found the village, which he called Bathanieh el-Gharbieh, to have 400 inhabitants. He further noted three grey white mutilated marble columns by the well. By the well, there were oxen which made the water rise in a huge bucket. Guérin noted that he had seen a similar system several other places in Palestine, as well as in Tunis.

An Ottoman village list of about 1870 indicated 91 houses and a population of 247, though the population count included men only.

In 1882, the PEF's Survey of Western Palestine described the two Butani villages as being made of adobe and "situated on low ground, with patches of garden and wells. The western one has also a pond."

=== British Mandate era ===
According to the 1922 census of Palestine conducted by the British Mandate authorities, Al-Batani al-Gharbi had a population of 556 inhabitants, all Muslims, which had increased in the 1931 census to 667, still all Muslim.

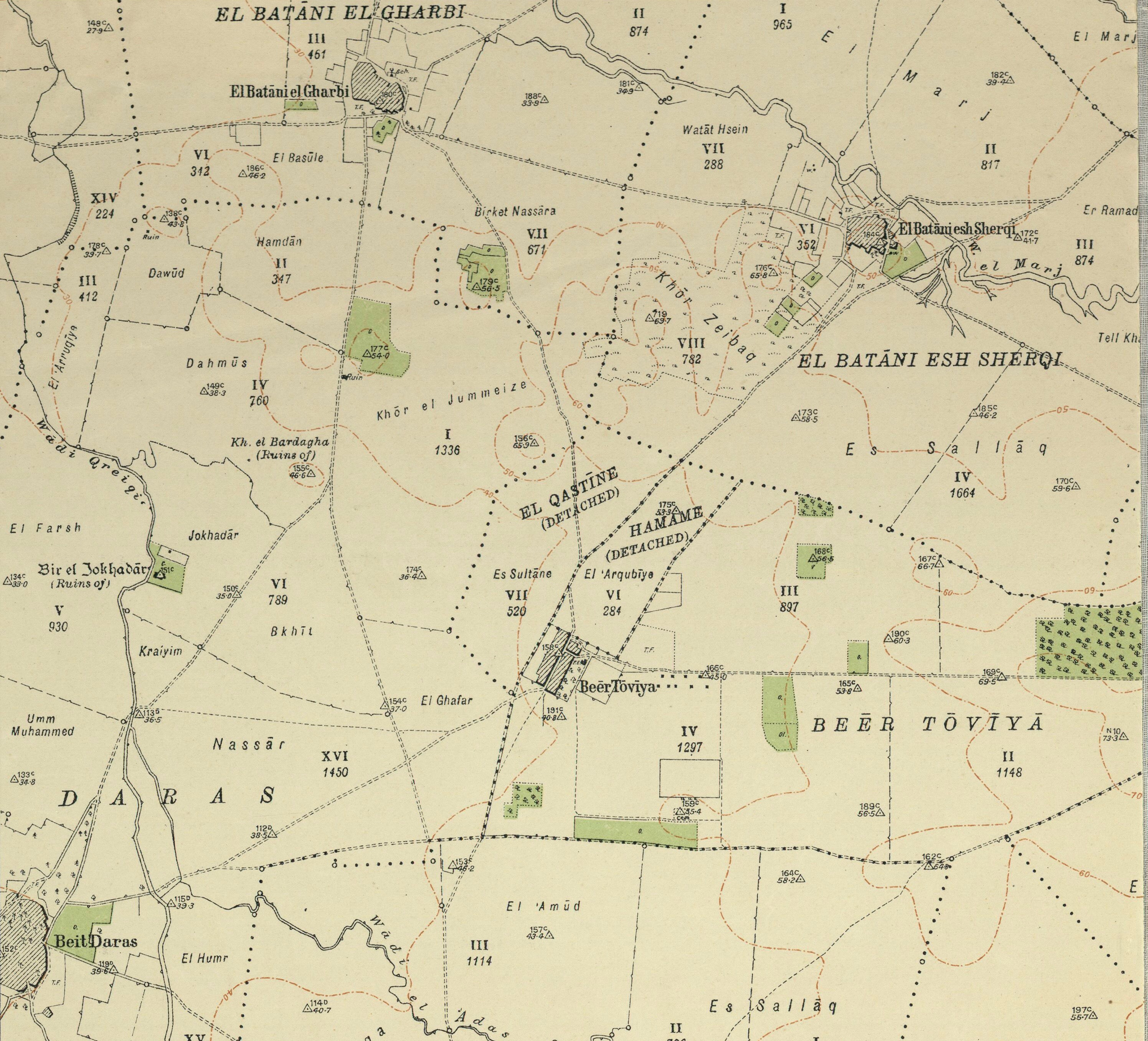
al-Batani al-Gharbi 1930 1:20,000

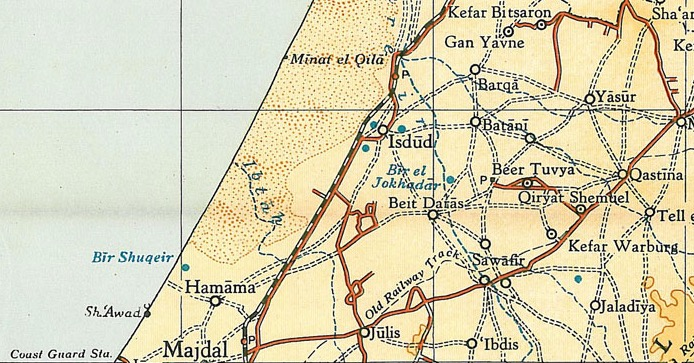
al-Batani 1945 1:250,000

The population in the 1945 statistics was 980 Muslims, with 4,574 dunams of land, according to an official land and population survey. Of this, 170 dunams were used for citrus and banana plants, 95 were for plantations and irrigable land, 4,152 used for cereals, while 34 dunams were classified as built-up land.

Al-Batani al-Gharbi had an elementary school for boys founded in 1947 and it had an initial enrollment of 119 students. The village had one mosque.

=== 1948, aftermath ===
In early May, 1948, the Al-Majdal Arab National Committee (NC), ordered the villagers of Al-Batani al-Gharbi, together with those of Al-Batani al-Sharqi, Yasur, Bayt Daras and the three Sawafir villages to stay put.

Al-Batani al-Gharbi became depopulated as part of Palmach's 'Operation Lightning' (Mivtza Barak). The objective was to compel the Arab inhabitants of the area to 'move' and by striking one or more population centres to cause an exodus, which was foreseen given the wave of panic that was sweeping Arab communities after the Deir Yassin massacre. After Haganah had hit Bayt Daras, the operational orders to them on the 10 May was to "subdue" Al-Batani al-Gharbi and Al-Batani al-Sharqi, "with the same means used vis-à-vis Aqir, Bashshit and Bayt Daras".

The village was depopulated around May 13, 1948. Following the war the area was incorporated into the State of Israel. In early 1949 American Quaker relief workers reported that many those living in tents in what became Maghazi refugee camp had come from Al-Batani al-Gharbi.

In 1992 the village site was described: "Cactuses and fig and sycamore trees grow on the site, and some of the village street are still clearly recognizable. The adjacent land is partially cultivated by the nearby kibbutz. A stone quarry is also located on village lands."

== Bibliography ==
- Barron, J. B., ed. (1923). Palestine: Report and General Abstracts of the Census of 1922. Government of Palestine.
- Conder, C.R.; Kitchener, H. H. (1882). The Survey of Western Palestine: Memoirs of the Topography, Orography, Hydrography, and Archaeology. Vol. 2. London: Committee of the Palestine Exploration Fund.
- Department of Statistics (1945). Village Statistics, April, 1945. Government of Palestine.
- Guérin, V. (1869). Description Géographique Historique et Archéologique de la Palestine. Vol. 1: Judee, pt. 2. Paris, L'Imprimerie Imp.
- Hadawi, S. (1970). Village Statistics of 1945: A Classification of Land and Area ownership in Palestine. Palestine Liberation Organization Research Centre. Archived from the original on 2018-12-08.
- Hartmann, M. (1883). "Die Ortschaftenliste des Liwa Jerusalem in dem türkischen Staatskalender für Syrien auf das Jahr 1288 der Flucht (1871)". Zeitschrift des Deutschen Palästina-Vereins. 6: 102–149.
- Karmon, Y. (1960). "An Analysis of Jacotin's Map of Palestine" (PDF). Israel Exploration Journal. 10 (3, 4): 155–173, 244–253. Archived from the original (PDF) on 2019-12-22.
- Khalidi, W. (1992). All That Remains: The Palestinian Villages Occupied and Depopulated by Israel in 1948. Washington D.C.: Institute for Palestine Studies. ISBN 0-88728-224-5.
- Mills, E., ed. (1932). Census of Palestine 1931. Population of Villages, Towns and Administrative Areas. Jerusalem: Government of Palestine.
- Morris, B. (2004). The Birth of the Palestinian Refugee Problem Revisited. Cambridge University Press. ISBN 978-0-521-00967-6.
- Palmer, E. H. (1881). The Survey of Western Palestine: Arabic and English Name Lists Collected During the Survey by Lieutenants Conder and Kitchener, R. E. Transliterated and Explained by E.H. Palmer. Committee of the Palestine Exploration Fund.
- Robinson, E.; Smith, E. (1841). Biblical Researches in Palestine, Mount Sinai and Arabia Petraea: A Journal of Travels in the year 1838. Vol. 3. Boston: Crocker & Brewster.
- Socin, A. (1879). "Alphabetisches Verzeichniss von Ortschaften des Paschalik Jerusalem". Zeitschrift des Deutschen Palästina-Vereins. 2: 135–163.
