= Bror Hayil =

Kibbutz in southern Israel

Bror Hayil: בְּרוֹר חַיִל (Hebrew)
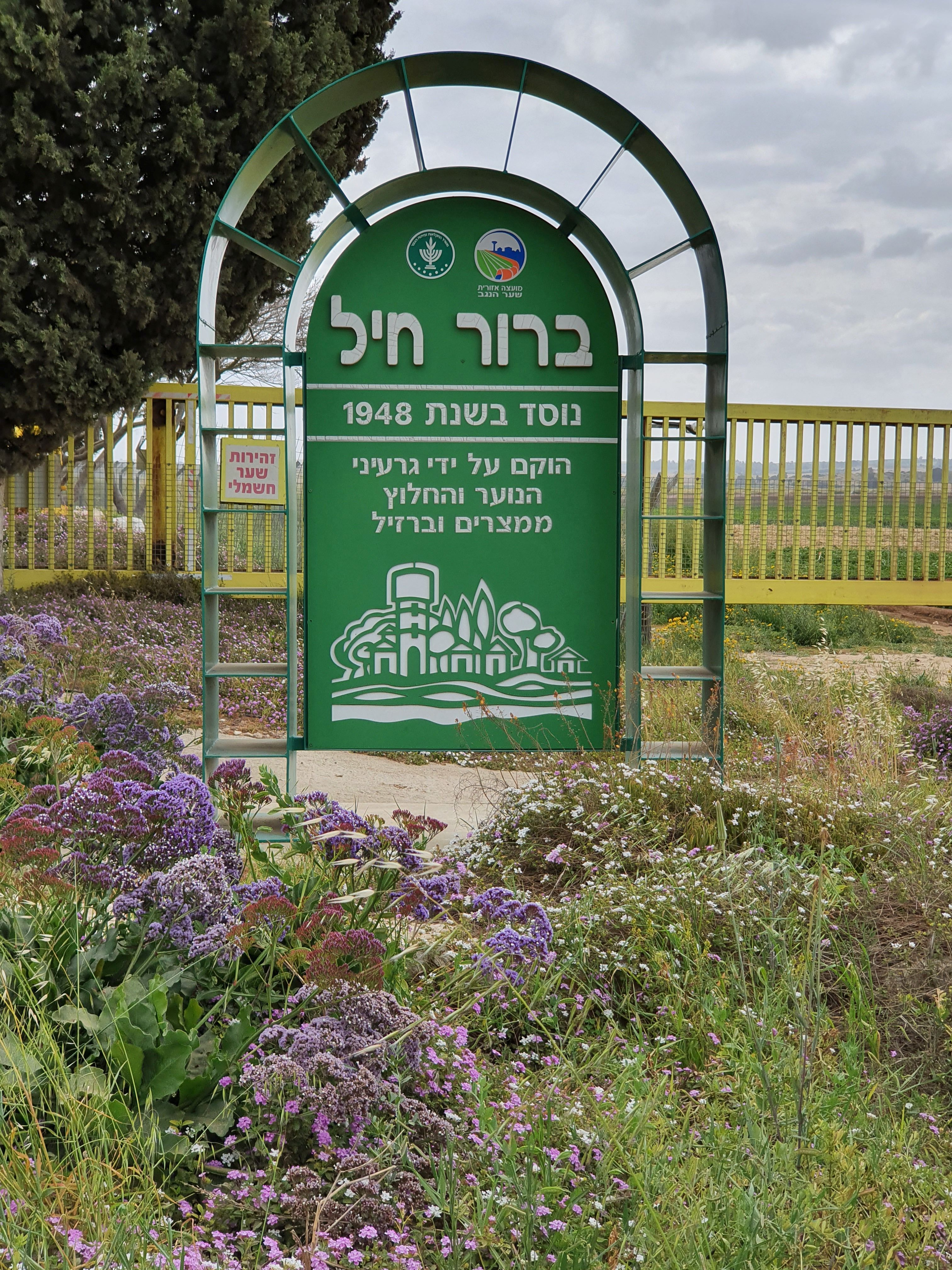
- Entrance sign

- Location within Ashkelon region of Israel
- Coordinates: 31°33′28″N 34°38′49″E
- Country: Israel
- District: Southern
- Subdistrict: Ashkelon
- Council: Sha'ar HaNegev
- Affiliation: Kibbutz Movement
- Founded: 2nd century (classic village); 10 April 1948 (kibbutz)
- Founder: Egyptian Jews
- Population (2024): 1,085

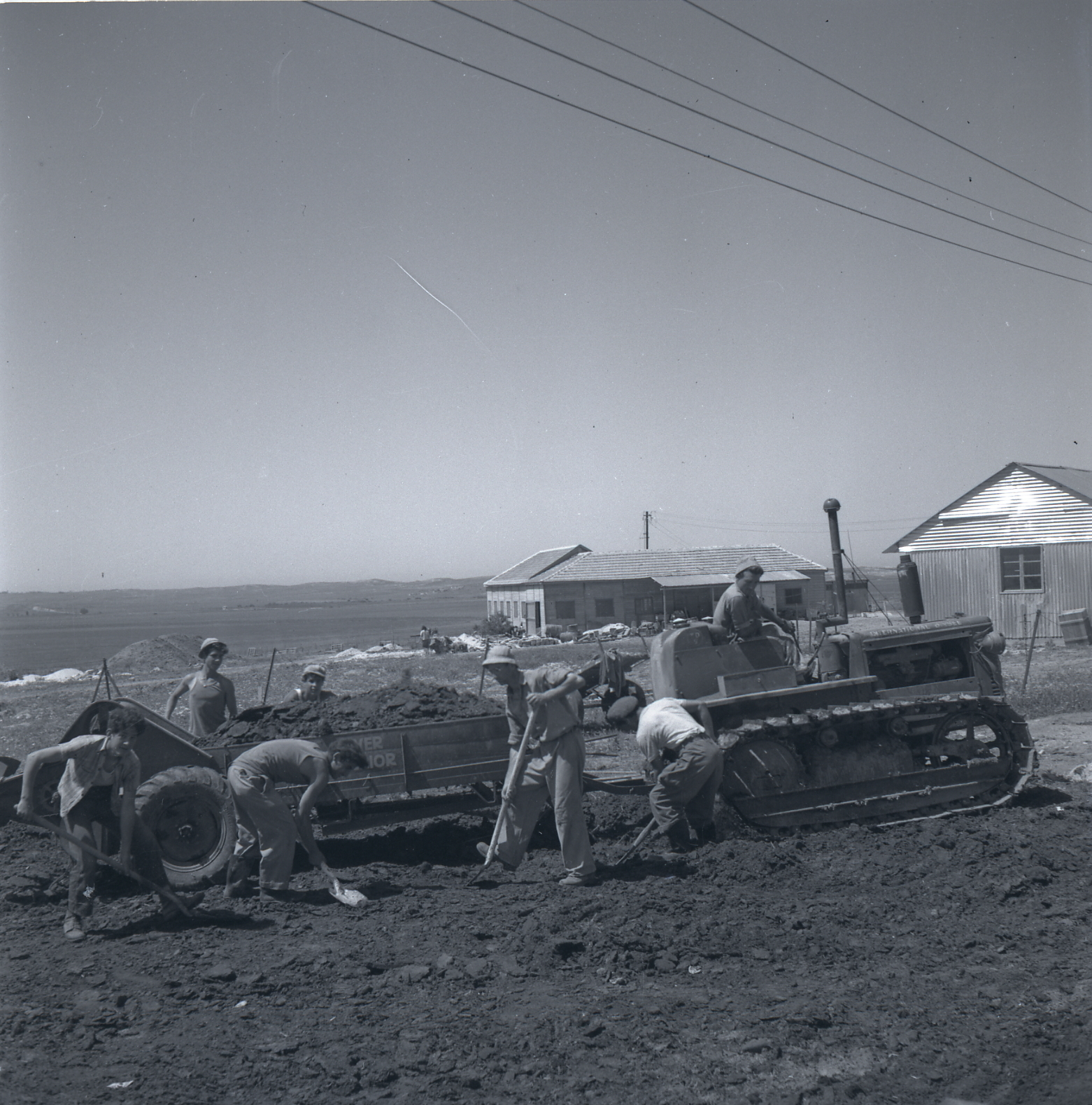
Members of the Kibbutz working in agriculture, 1951. Boris Carmi, Meitar collection, National Library of Israel

Bror Hayil (Hebrew: בְּרוֹר חַיִל) is a kibbutz in southern Israel. Located near Sderot, it falls under the jurisdiction of Sha'ar HaNegev Regional Council. In 2024 it had a population of 1,085.

== Etymology ==
The name Bror Hayil means "selection of soldiers". It may be associated with the Bar Kokhba Revolt against the Romans in the first half of the 2nd century CE.

A Jewish village called Bror Hayil existed during the Talmudic era, where is now the ruins of the Palestinian village of Burayr, and was the site of a yeshiva headed by rabbi Johanan ben Zakai. According to the Talmud (Sanhedrin 32b), candlelight at night in Bror Hayil was a sign that a male child had been born, and that the villagers were to prepare for the child's impending circumcision. The present kibbutz takes its name from the ancient village of the same name.

== History ==
Bror Hayil was the only Jewish village founded between the UN Partition Plan on 29 November 1947 and the Israeli Declaration of Independence on 14 May 1948. Its establishment required a number of stages; on 10 April 1948, a group of Jewish immigrants from Egypt set up a camp in the area on land purchased by the Jewish National Fund, with the procedure resembling the "Tower and stockade" settlement operation from the time of the 1936–1939 Arab revolt. A few days later, The New York Times reported,

The Jews yesterday [April 19] founded a new settlement called Brur Hayal at the edge of the Negeb desert, in that part of southern Palestine where Egyptian volunteers are reported to be preparing a “second front’’. The colonists are veterans who served with the British Army during World II. They drove a convoy of twenty-four armored trucks to a hilltop situated less than a mile from Palestinian village of Bureir during the night. When the Arabs awoke they found the Jews setting up prefabricated houses and building a defensive wall and watchtower. The Arabs promptly opened fire, but by noon the houses and the wall were in place.

The nearby Palestinian village of Burayr was depopulated during the war and the kibbutz subsequently expanded onto land nearby.

After many of the Egyptian Jewish founders left, it became the target kibbutz of the Brazilian branch of the Zionist youth movement Dror, and later Habonim Dror. Today, many residents are immigrants from Brazil. In 2012, Brazil's foreign minister Antonio Patriota visited Bror Hayil.

== Economy ==
In addition to its agricultural pursuits, the kibbutz runs a pizza factory in partnership with the Soglowek group. Many residents work outside the kibbutz, at factories and plants in Sderot, the Sha'ar HaNegev Educational Campus, Sapir College and Amdocs.

The Ben Shushan winery, established by agronomist Yuval Ben-Shoshan, released its first wine from the vintage of 1998. It uses grapes raised in the desert for its Cabernet Sauvignon and Merlot, as well as grapes from Kerem Ben Zimra in the Galilee. The winery produces 10,000 bottles annually in three series, Kfar Shamai, Har'el and Avdat.

The kibbutz is also home to a high tech company named AKOLogic, which specializes in cloud computing platforms for farmers.

== Culture ==
The kibbutz has a museum of Brazilian heritage and music. One exhibit is the gavel used by the president of the UN General Assembly in 1948, Osvaldo Aranha of Brazil, who supported the creation of the State of Israel.

== Notable people ==
- Yehonatan Yifrah
- Eliyahu Moyal
