= Yehonatan Yifrah =

Israeli politician (1929–2008)

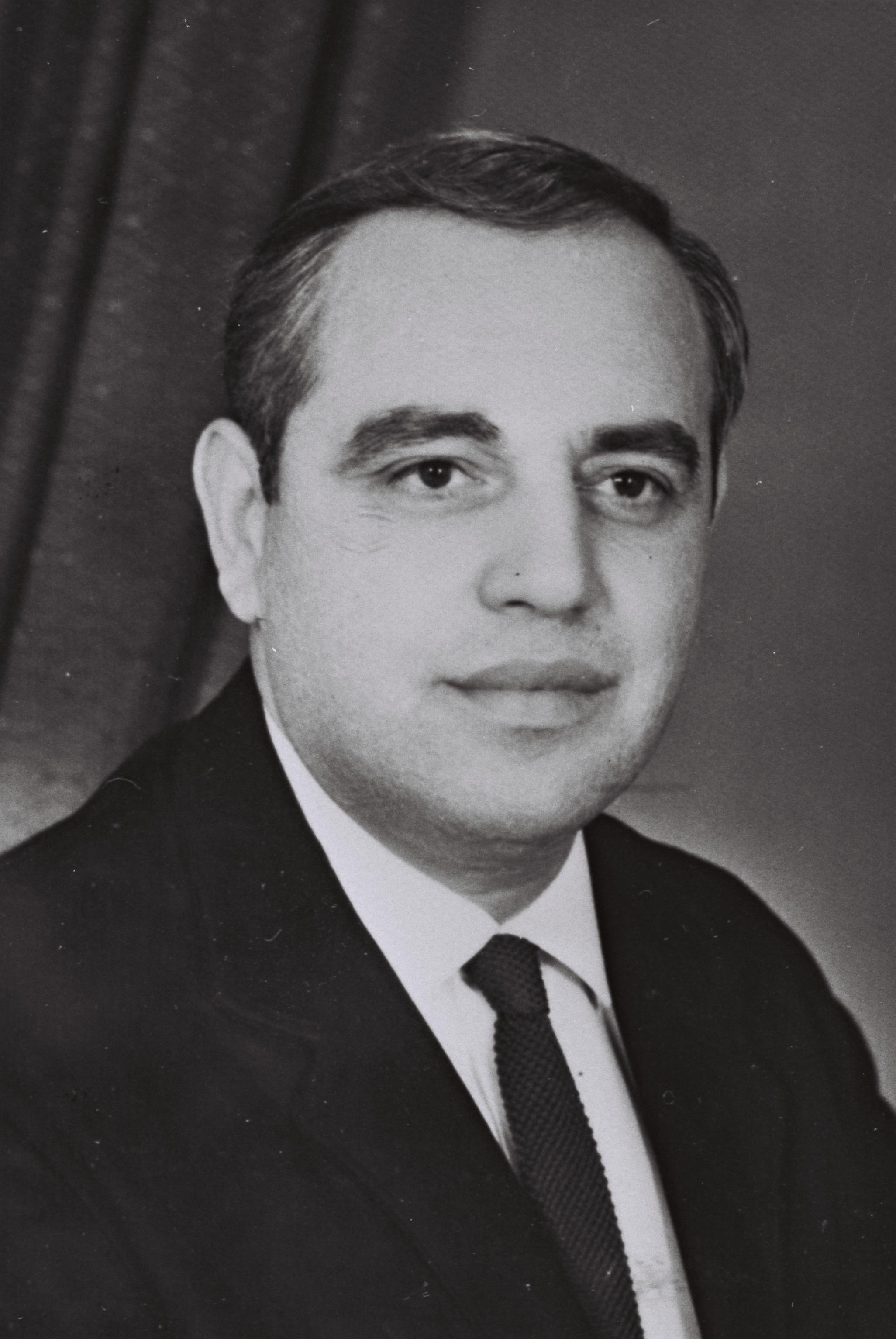
- Yifrah in 1969

Faction represented in the Knesset
- 1969–1974: Alignment

Personal details
- Born: 24 October 1929; Casablanca, Morocco
- Died: 19 April 2008 (aged 78)

Yehonatan Yifrah (Hebrew: יהונתן יפרח; 24 October 1929 – 19 April 2008) was an Israeli politician who served as a member of the Knesset for the Alignment between 1969 and 1974.

== Biography ==
Born in Casablanca in Morocco, Yifrah was a member of the Habonim youth movement, and became an instructor for the movement in Algeria.

He emigrated to Israel in 1951 and joined kibbutz Bror Hayil, before settling in Sderot in 1957. Between 1957 and 1959 he was secretary of Sderot Workers Council, before serving as head of the town's local council between 1962 and 1971.

In 1969 he was elected to the Knesset on the Alignment list, but lost his seat in the 1973 elections.

He died in 2008 at the age of 78 of multiple organ dysfunction syndrome.
