= Maghazi refugee camp =

Palestinian refugee camp in the Deir al-Balah Governorate in the central Gaza Strip

Maghazi
- Palestinian refugee camp

Arabic transcription(s)
  - Arabic: مخيم المغازي
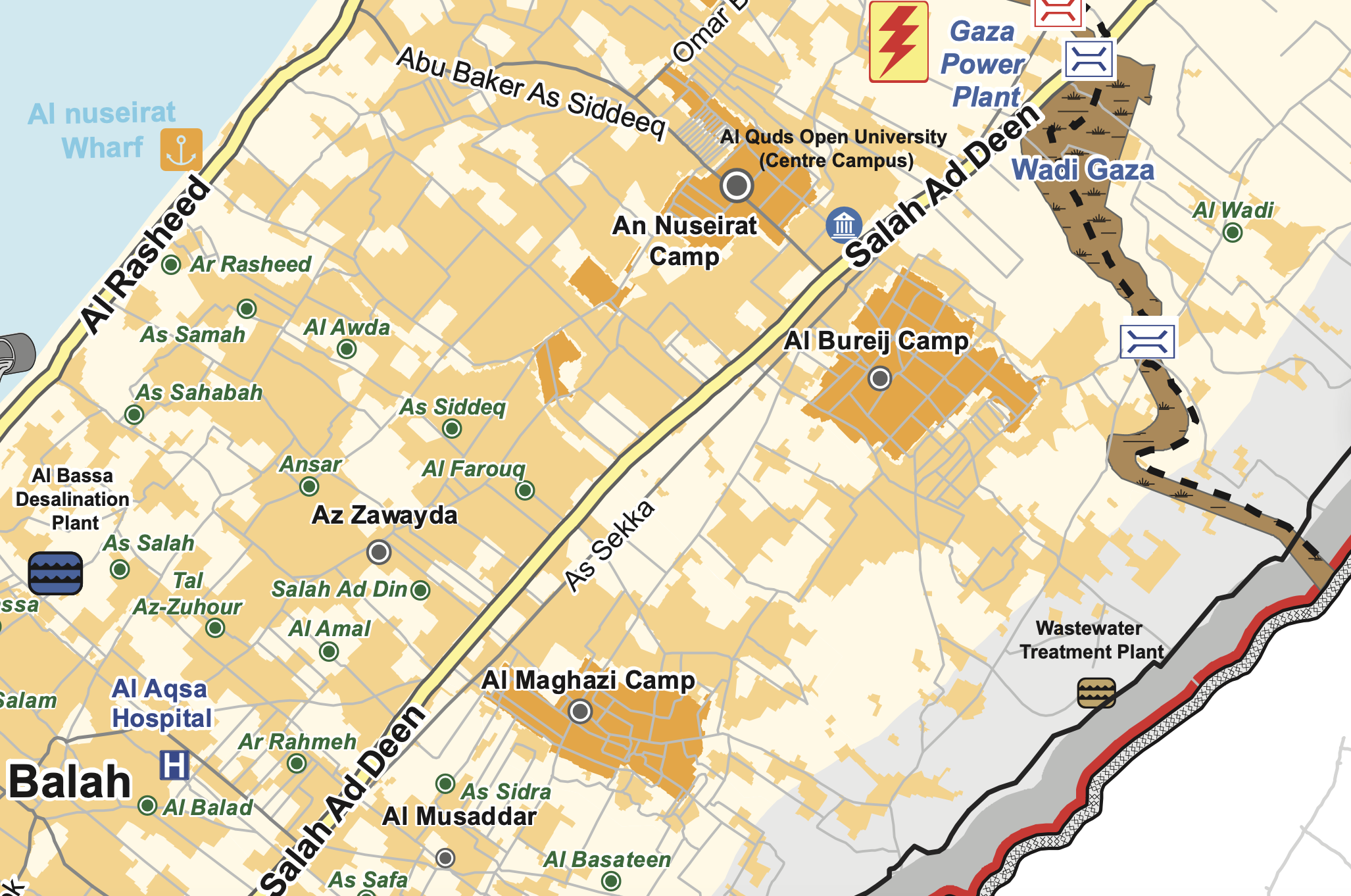
- Map of the camp, as well as the two other adjacent camps of Nuseirat and Bureij

- Location of Maghazi within Palestine
- Coordinates: 31°25′16.89″N 34°23′07.35″E
- State: State of Palestine
- Governorate: Deir al-Balah
- Founded: 1949

Government
  - Type: Refugee Camp

Area
  - Total: 0.559 km^{2} (0.216 sq mi)

Population (2023)
  - Total: 33,000
  - Density: 59,000/km^{2} (150,000/sq mi)
- Population total includes that of the refugee camp and the Maghazi municipality

Maghazi (Arabic: مخيم المغازي) is a Palestinian refugee camp located in the Deir al-Balah Governorate in the central Gaza Strip. It was established in 1949. The camp is built on 559 dunums (0.6 km^{2}). In July 2023, the UNRWA reported its population to be 33,000. During the first months of the Gaza war, its population tripled and faced repeated airstrikes by the Israel Defense Forces (IDF).

== History ==
In early 1949 Quaker aid workers visited Maghazi and reported that there were 2,500 refugees camped on privately owned land. They were living in Bedouin and Egyptian army tents as well the British army barracks. Most of the refugees had come from eight villages including Yasur, Qastina, Al-Batani al-Sharqi, Al-Batani al-Gharbi and Al-Maghar.

== Population ==
According to the Palestinian Central Bureau of Statistics, the camp had a population of 18,157 in 2017 and the surrounding Maghazi municipality had a population of 9,670. In July 2023, the United Nations agency UNRWA reported that its population was 33,000.

During the Gaza war, population surged to 100,000 as the Israel Defense Forces (IDF) ordered Gaza residents to flee to the south.

== Income ==
Before the Gaza Strip's closure to Israel in 2000 following the Al-Aqsa Intifada, most residents had taken a number of various jobs in Israel or worked as farmers at local tells and pastures. There is a weekly souk, or open-air market, on Sunday in which residents buy or sell goods from their workshops, bakeries, cafes, diners and grocery lots.

As of 2023 there were around 30 municipality workers.

== Education ==
Maghazi has three elementary schools and 2 junior high schools run by the UNRWA. 6,407 pupils had enrolled at these schools in the 2004-2005 year. In 1998, the UNRWA provided integrated educational services to 1,264 children with disabilities. There are a number of youth activities that involve in athletics, social and cultural programs.

One UNRWA school was bombed by the IDF in 2023. Another two were used to house around 25,000 displaced Palestinians during the Gaza war.

== Raids and warfare ==
On the evening of Monday 6 January 2003, the IDF raided the camp, killed three Palestinians and wounded dozens, saying they were targeting militants hiding there.

In 2023, the camp was struck by Israeli airstrikes on 17 October, 5 November, 6 December and 24 December. Bombing destroyed the only bakery in the camp. According to the Gaza Health Ministry, the 5 November airstrikes killed 50 people and the 24 December airstrikes killed 70 people. Refugees in the camp faced disease epidemics, blockades preventing the import of food, water and sanitary products, and blocked access to landfill sites. Two of its seven wells were bombed, while the others were inoperable as fuel could not be imported.

On August 7, 2024 an Israeli raid on the camp killed two people, and injured dozens.
