= Al-Batani al-Sharqi =

al-Batani al-Sharqi البطاني الشرقي
- Etymology: The eastern Butani
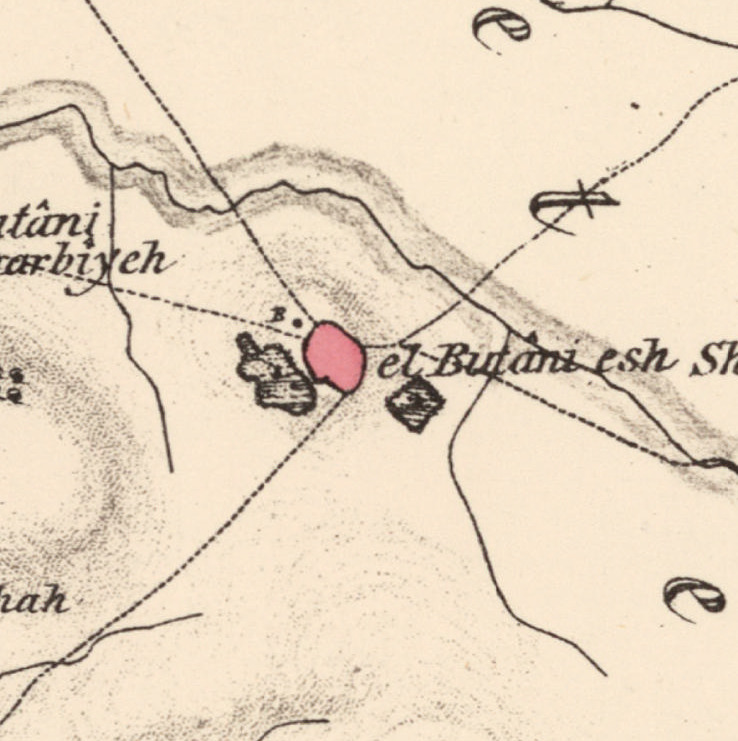
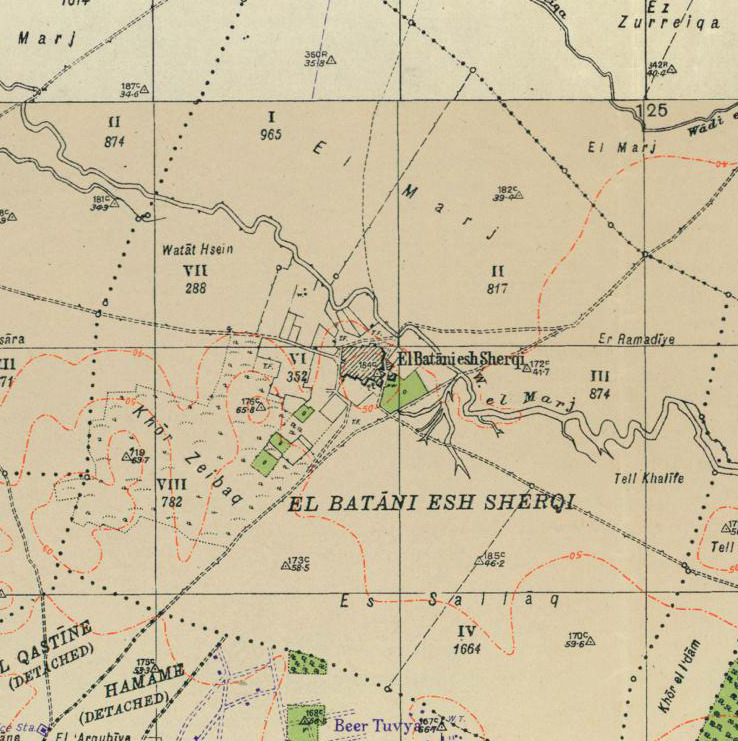
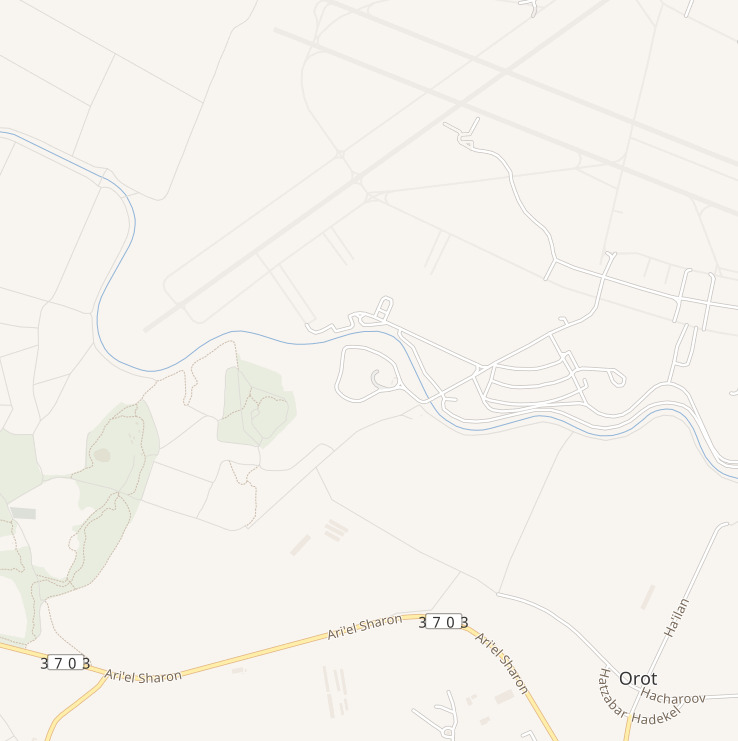
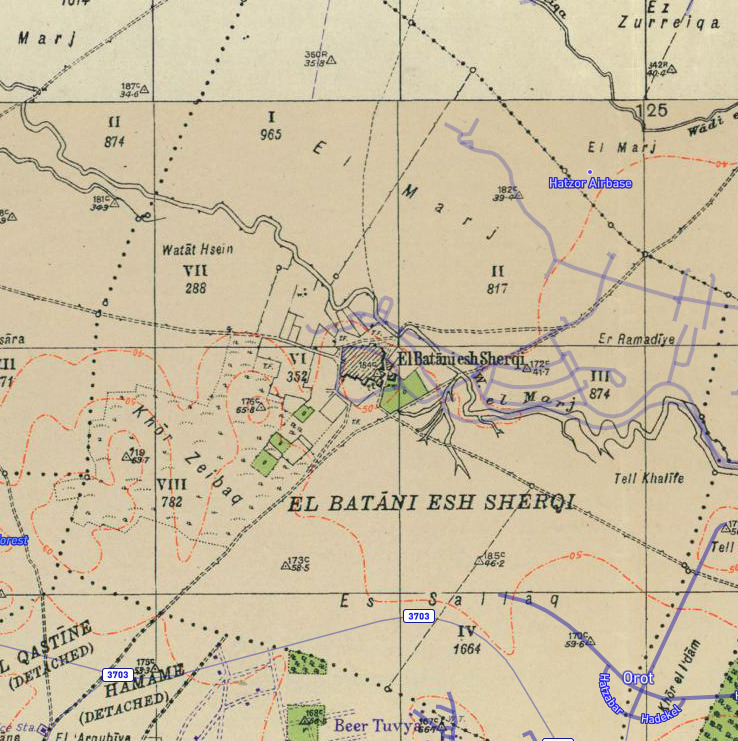
- 1870s map 1940s map modern map 1940s with modern overlay map A series of historical maps of the area around Al-Batani al-Sharqi (click the buttons)

- Location within Mandatory Palestine
- Coordinates: 31°45′07″N 34°43′24″E
- Palestine grid: 123/128
- Geopolitical entity: Mandatory Palestine
- Subdistrict: Gaza
- Date of depopulation: May 13, 1948

Area
  - Total: 5.8 km^{2} (2.2 sq mi)

Population (1945)
  - Total: 650
- Cause(s) of depopulation: Military assault by Yishuv forces
- Current Localities: None

Al-Batani al-Sharqi (Arabic: البطاني الشرقي) was a Palestinian Arab village in the Gaza Subdistrict, located 36.5 kilometers (22.7 mi) northeast of Gaza situated in the flat terrain on the southern coastal plain of Palestine. It had a population of 650 in 1945. Al-Batani al-Sharqi was depopulated during the 1948 Arab-Israeli War.

== History ==
Ceramics from the Byzantine era have been found here, together with coins from reigns of Phocas and Constantine IV.

One mention of al-Batani indicates that it was founded as a ranch by the Umayyad caliph Mu'awiya I in the 8th century CE.

=== Ottoman era ===
Al-Batani al-Sharqi, like the rest of Palestine, was incorporated into the Ottoman Empire in 1517, and in the tax registers of 1596, it was a village in the nahiya of Gaza, east of Isdud, north of Bayt Daras and part of the Sanjak of Gaza with a population of 39. Al-Batani paid taxes on wheat, barley, fruit, beehives, goats, and vineyards. The whole population was Muslim. The village appeared as an unnamed village on the map of Pierre Jacotin compiled in 1799.

In 1838, Robinson noted el-Butaniyeh, the east, as Muslim village located in the Gaza district.

In 1863 the French explorer Victor Guérin visited the village which he called Bathanieh Ech-Charkieh. He found about 100 adobe brick houses, and ancient stones lying on the ground near a well. Tobacco plantations grew in gardens surrounded by cactus hedges.

Socin, citing an official Ottoman village list compiled around 1870, noted that Al-Batani al-Sharqi had 89 houses and a population of 265, though the population count included men, only. Hartmann found that el-batanije esch-scharkije had 85 houses.

In 1882, the PEF's Survey of Western Palestine (SWP) described al-Batani al-Sharqi as being situated on low ground and extended from east to west in a rectangular shape. Patches of garden and a number of wells surrounded the village.

=== British Mandate era ===
In the 1922 census of Palestine, conducted by the British Mandate authorities, Batani Sharqi had a population of 304 inhabitants, all Muslims, increasing in the 1931 census to 404, still all Muslim, in 85 houses.

Construction expanded westward—the Wadi al-Mari's winter flooding impeded eastward expansion—along the road that linked to al-Batani al-Gharbi until the distance between the two villages was less than 2 kilometers (1.2 mi). Village houses, made of adobe, with wood-and-cane roofs, were built close together along narrow alleys. The two al-Batanis shared an elementary school that was opened in 1947; its initial enrollment was 119 students. The village had a mosque and a number of small shops. The entire population was Muslim.

In the 1945 statistics Al-Batani al-Sharqi had a population of 650, all Muslims, with 5,764 dunams of land, according to an official land and population survey. Of this, 319 dunams were allocated to citrus and banana plants, 474 plantations and irrigable land, 4,733 used for cereals, while 32 dunams were built-up land.

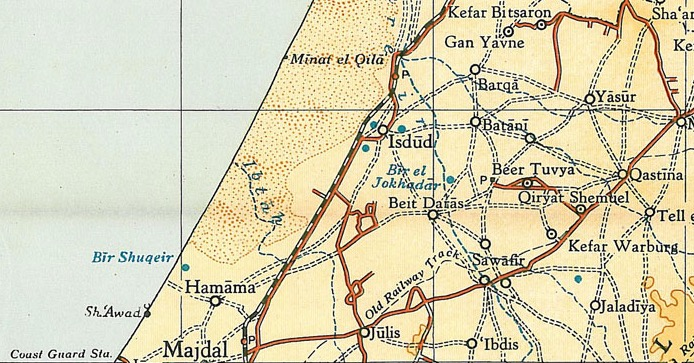
al-Batani 1945 1:250,000

=== 1948 war and aftermath ===
In early May, 1948, the Al-Majdal Arab National Committee (NC), ordered the villagers of Al-Batani al-Sharqi, together with those of Al-Batani al-Gharbi, Yasur, Bayt Daras and the three Sawafir villages to stay put.

It became depopulated shortly afterwards as part of Palmach's 'Operation Lightning' (Mivtza Barak). After they had hit Bayt Daras, the operational orders to Haganah on the 10 May was to "subdue" Al-Batani al-Gharbi and Al-Batani al-Sharqi, "with the same means used vis-à-vis Aqir, Bashshit and Bayt Daras".

Together with nearby Bashshit and Barqa, al-Batani al-Sharqi was captured by the Haganah's Givati Brigade, just before the end of the British Mandate period in Palestine. According to Israeli historian Benny Morris, it fell on May 13, 1948, as part of Operation Barak in which the Haganah moved southwards in anticipation of an engagement with Egyptian forces.

The History of the War of Independence, however, states that it was captured by Israeli Jewish forces under the Givati Brigade's Eighth Battalion on June 10–11. Palestinian historian Walid Khalidi said that this may have meant that the village briefly changed hands in the course of Israeli-Egyptian battles on the southern front before the first truce came into effect on June 11.

In early 1949 American Quaker relief workers reported that many those living in tents in what became Maghazi refugee camp had come from Al-Batani al-Sharqi.

Following the war the area was incorporated into the State of Israel, with the villages lands remaining undeveloped. In 1992 the village site was described: "Only a dilapidated police station from the Mandate period survives. It is a complex of three single-storey, concrete flat-roofed buildings. One of the buildings is higher than the other two; all three have rectangular doors and windows. A village street is clearly visible. Cactuses and fig, eucalyptus, and sycamore trees are scattered over the site. Israeli farmers cultivate citrus on the adjacent lands."

== See also ==
- Depopulated Palestinian locations in Israel

== Bibliography ==
- Barron, J. B., ed. (1923). Palestine: Report and General Abstracts of the Census of 1922. Government of Palestine.
- Conder, C.R.; Kitchener, H. H. (1882). The Survey of Western Palestine: Memoirs of the Topography, Orography, Hydrography, and Archaeology. Vol. 2. London: Committee of the Palestine Exploration Fund.
- Dauphin, C. (1998). La Palestine byzantine, Peuplement et Populations. BAR International Series 726 (in French). Vol. III : Catalogue. Oxford: Archeopress. ISBN 0-860549-05-4.
- Department of Statistics (1945). Village Statistics, April, 1945. Government of Palestine.
- Guérin, V. (1869). Description Géographique Historique et Archéologique de la Palestine (in French). Vol. 1: Judee, pt. 2. Paris: L'Imprimerie Nationale.
- Hadawi, S. (1970). Village Statistics of 1945: A Classification of Land and Area ownership in Palestine. Palestine Liberation Organization Research Center. Archived from the original on 2018-12-08.
- Hartmann, M. (1883). "Die Ortschaftenliste des Liwa Jerusalem in dem türkischen Staatskalender für Syrien auf das Jahr 1288 der Flucht (1871)". Zeitschrift des Deutschen Palästina-Vereins. 6: 102–149.
- Hütteroth, W.-D.; Abdulfattah, K. (1977). Historical Geography of Palestine, Transjordan and Southern Syria in the Late 16th Century. Erlanger Geographische Arbeiten, Sonderband 5. Erlangen, Germany: Vorstand der Fränkischen Geographischen Gesellschaft. ISBN 3-920405-41-2.
- Karmon, Y. (1960). "An Analysis of Jacotin's Map of Palestine" (PDF). Israel Exploration Journal. 10 (3, 4): 155–173, 244–253. Archived from the original (PDF) on 2019-12-22.
- Khalidi, W. (1992). All That Remains: The Palestinian Villages Occupied and Depopulated by Israel in 1948. Washington D.C.: Institute for Palestine Studies. ISBN 0-88728-224-5.
- Mills, E., ed. (1932). Census of Palestine 1931. Population of Villages, Towns and Administrative Areas. Jerusalem: Government of Palestine.
- Morris, B. (2004). The Birth of the Palestinian Refugee Problem Revisited. Cambridge University Press. ISBN 978-0-521-00967-6.
- Palmer, E. H. (1881). The Survey of Western Palestine: Arabic and English Name Lists Collected During the Survey by Lieutenants Conder and Kitchener, R. E. Transliterated and Explained by E.H. Palmer. Committee of the Palestine Exploration Fund.
- Robinson, E.; Smith, E. (1841). Biblical Researches in Palestine, Mount Sinai and Arabia Petraea: A Journal of Travels in the year 1838. Vol. 3. Boston: Crocker & Brewster.
- Socin, A. (1879). "Alphabetisches Verzeichniss von Ortschaften des Paschalik Jerusalem". Zeitschrift des Deutschen Palästina-Vereins. 2: 135–163.
