= Najd, Gaza =

Najd نجد
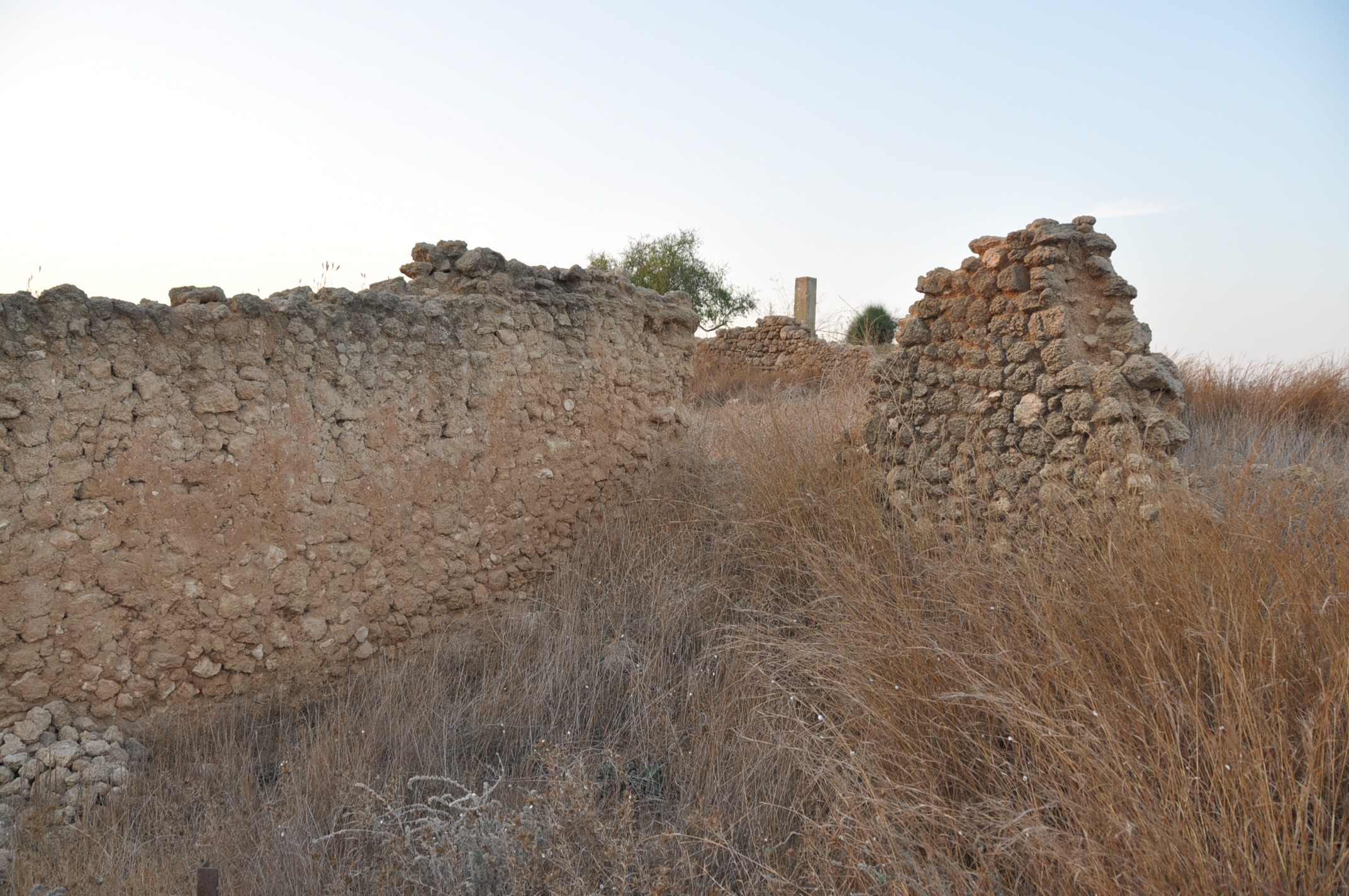
- Village ruins, 2010
- Etymology: Highland
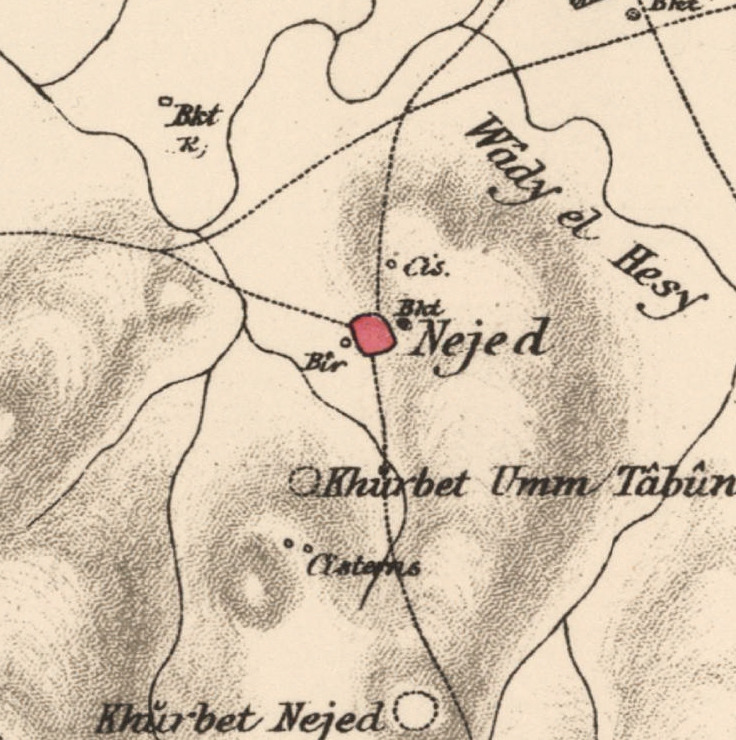
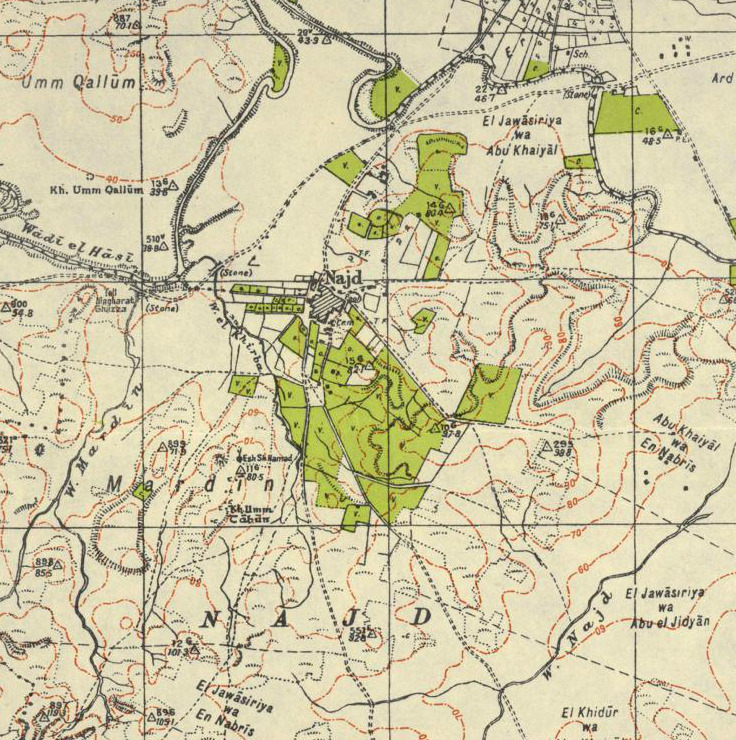
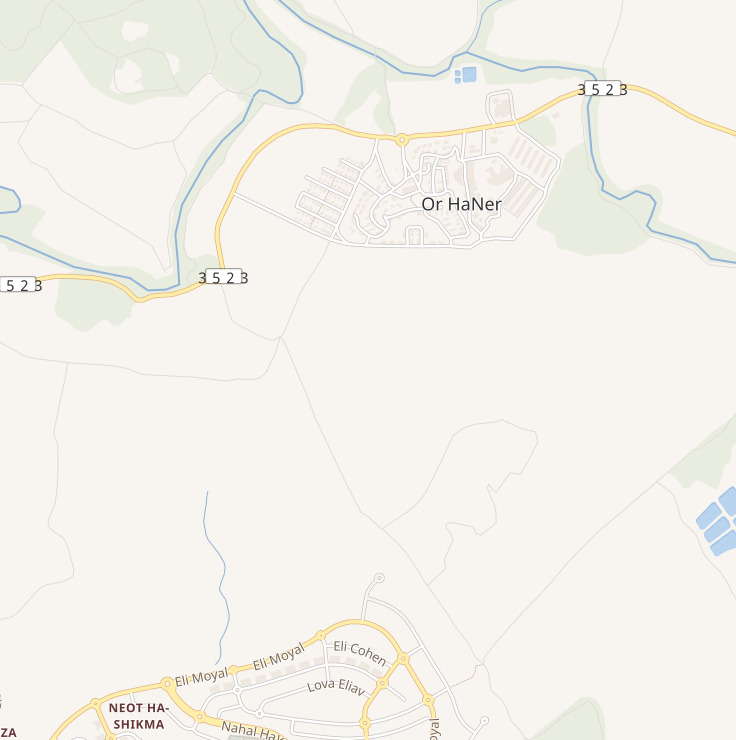
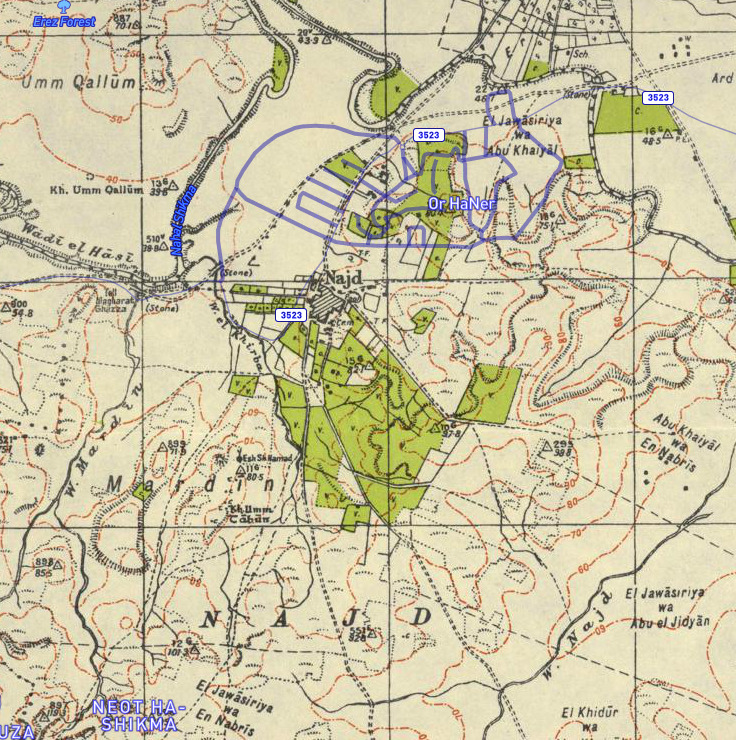
- 1870s map 1940s map modern map 1940s with modern overlay map A series of historical maps of the area around Najd, Gaza (click the buttons)

- Location within Mandatory Palestine
- Coordinates: 31°33′02″N 34°35′55″E
- Palestine grid: 111/106
- Geopolitical entity: Mandatory Palestine
- Subdistrict: Gaza
- Date of depopulation: 12 May 1948

Area
  - Total: 13,576 dunams (13.576 km^{2}; 5.242 sq mi)

Population (1945)
  - Total: 620
- Cause(s) of depopulation: Expulsion by Yishuv forces
- Current Localities: Sderot, Or HaNer

Najd (Arabic: نجد) was a Palestinian Arab village, located 14 kilometers (8.7 mi) northeast of Gaza City. During the British Mandate in Palestine, children from Najd attended school in the nearby village of Simsim. On 13 May 1948, Najd was occupied by the Negev Brigade as part of Operation Barak, and the villagers were expelled.

== Etymology ==
Palmer wrote that the name came of the village came from the word for "Highland", while Socin writes that the name comes from "Beautiful".

== History ==
Ceramics from the Byzantine period have been found here.

=== Ottoman era ===
Najd was incorporated into the Ottoman Empire in 1517 with the rest of Palestine, and in the 1596 tax registers, the village, called Najd al-Garbi, was located in the nahiya (subdistrict) of Gaza under the liwa' (district) of Gaza. It had a population of 39 Muslim household; an estimated 215 persons. The villagers paid a fixed tax-rate of 33.3% on a number of crops, including wheat, barley and fruit, as well as on goats, beehives and vineyards; a total of 4,000 akçe.

During the 17th and 18th centuries, the area of Najd experienced a significant process of settlement decline due to nomadic pressures on local communities. The residents of abandoned villages moved to surviving settlements, but the land continued to be cultivated by neighboring villages.

Edward Robinson, who travelled through Palestine in 1838, noted that Najd lay south of a wadi, and described how the villagers were winnowing barley by throwing it into the air against the wind with wooden forks. He also noted it as a Muslim village, located in the Gaza district.

In 1863 the French explorer Victor Guérin visited the village, describing it as being on a small height, and with three hundred inhabitants. An Ottoman village list of about 1870 showed that Najd had 24 houses and a population of 56, though the population count included only men.

In 1883 the PEF's Survey of Western Palestine described Najd as a small village with a well and a pond.

=== British mandate era ===
The Mukhtar of Najd, 1939

As the population grew during the Mandate period, the village expanded northwestward. The village population was Muslim, and the children attended school in Simsim, 2 kilometers (1.2 mi) to the northeast. The villagers worked primarily in agriculture and animal husbandry. Fields of grain and fruit trees surrounded Najd on all sides. The fruit trees were concentrated to the north and northeastern sides, where irrigation water was available from wells.

In the 1922 census of Palestine conducted by the British Mandate authorities, Nejd had a population of 305 inhabitants, all Muslims, while in the 1931 census, Najd had 82 occupied houses and a population of 422 Muslims.

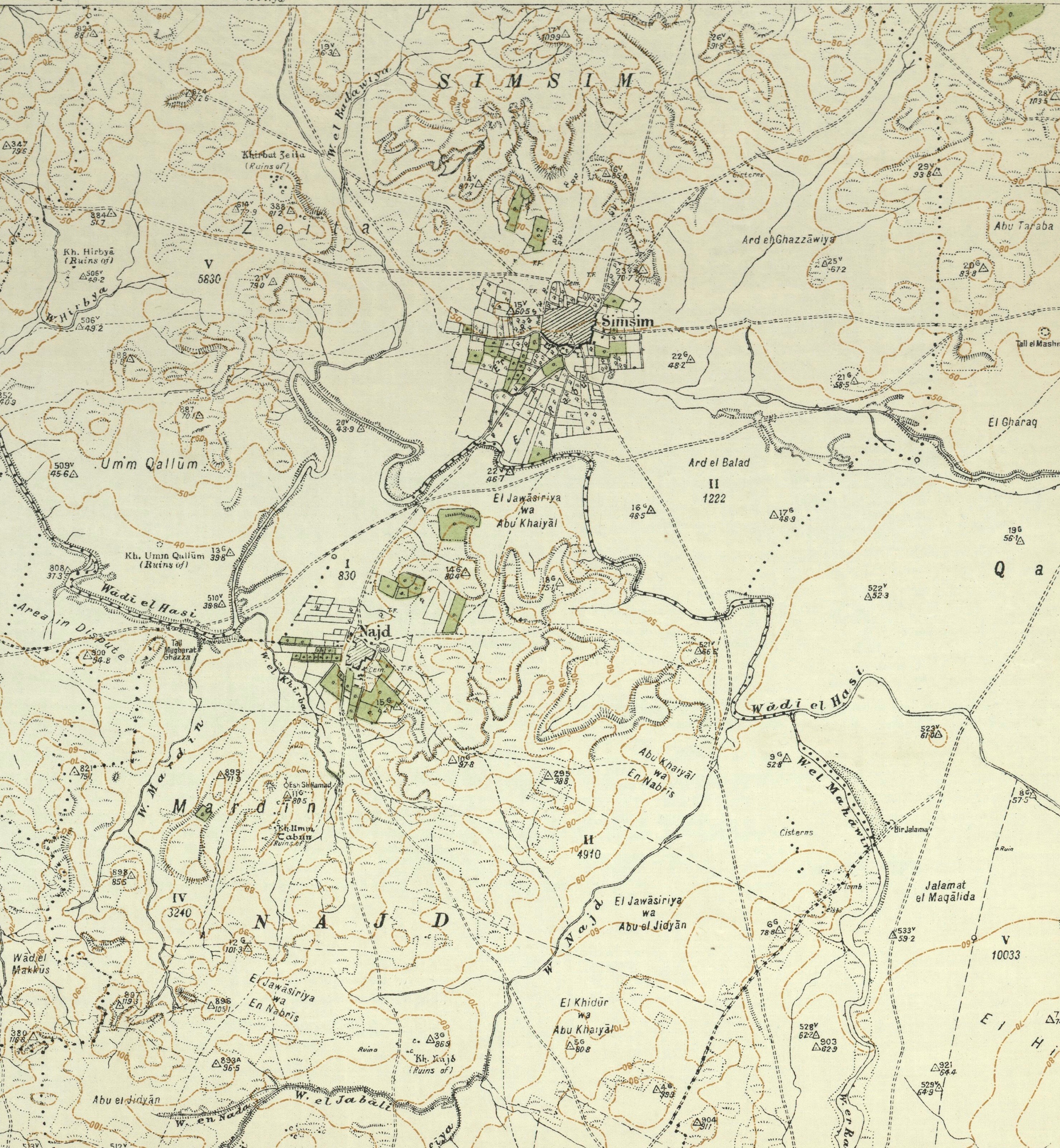
Najd 1931 1:20,000

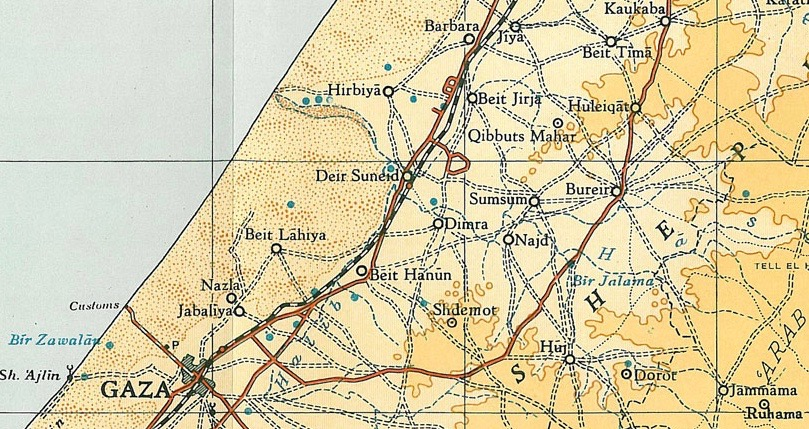
Najd 1945 1:250,000

By the 1945 statistics the population was estimated to be 620, all Muslims with a total of 13,576 dunams of land. Cultivated lands in the village in 1944–45 included a total of 10 dunums allocated for citrus and bananas and 11,916 dunums for cereals. An additional 511 dunums were irrigated or used for orchards, while 26 dunams were built-up, urban, land.

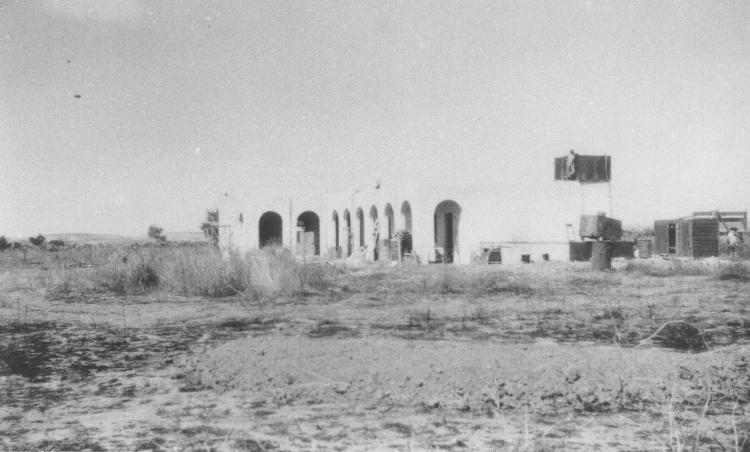
School building used by Yiftach Brigade as dining room, Najd, 1949

=== 1948 War and aftermath ===
According to Benny Morris, the villagers of Najd were expelled by soldiers from the Negev Brigade on 12–13 May, during the 1948 Arab–Israeli War.

Following the war the area was incorporated into the State of Israel and the city of Sderot was founded in 1951 on village land, a few miles to the south of the village site, while Or HaNer was founded in 1957 also on village land, to the northeast.

== See also ==
- Depopulated Palestinian locations in Israel

== Bibliography ==
- Barron, J. B., ed. (1923). Palestine: Report and General Abstracts of the Census of 1922. Government of Palestine.
- Conder, C.R.; Kitchener, H. H. (1883). The Survey of Western Palestine: Memoirs of the Topography, Orography, Hydrography, and Archaeology. Vol. 3. London: Committee of the Palestine Exploration Fund.
- Dauphin, C. (1998). La Palestine byzantine, Peuplement et Populations. BAR International Series 726 (in French). Vol. III : Catalogue. Oxford: Archeopress. ISBN 0-860549-05-4.
- Department of Statistics (1945). Village Statistics, April, 1945. Government of Palestine.
- Glass, C.: "The Ordeals of Gaza Archived 2009-04-28 at the Wayback Machine", Lecture at the School of Oriental and African Studies (SOAS), London 22 Jan 09
- Guérin, V. (1869). Description Géographique Historique et Archéologique de la Palestine (in French). Vol. 1: Judee, pt. 2. Paris: L'Imprimerie Nationale.
- Hadawi, S. (1970). Village Statistics of 1945: A Classification of Land and Area ownership in Palestine. Palestine Liberation Organization Research Center.
- Hartmann, M. (1883). "Die Ortschaftenliste des Liwa Jerusalem in dem türkischen Staatskalender für Syrien auf das Jahr 1288 der Flucht (1871)". Zeitschrift des Deutschen Palästina-Vereins. 6: 102–149.
- Hütteroth, W.-D.; Abdulfattah, K. (1977). Historical Geography of Palestine, Transjordan and Southern Syria in the Late 16th Century. Erlanger Geographische Arbeiten, Sonderband 5. Erlangen, Germany: Vorstand der Fränkischen Geographischen Gesellschaft. ISBN 3-920405-41-2.
- Khalidi, W. (1992). All That Remains: The Palestinian Villages Occupied and Depopulated by Israel in 1948. Washington D.C.: Institute for Palestine Studies. ISBN 0-88728-224-5.
- Mills, E., ed. (1932). Census of Palestine 1931. Population of Villages, Towns and Administrative Areas. Jerusalem: Government of Palestine.
- Morris, B. (2004). The Birth of the Palestinian Refugee Problem Revisited. Cambridge University Press. ISBN 978-0-521-00967-6.
- Palmer, E. H. (1881). The Survey of Western Palestine: Arabic and English Name Lists Collected During the Survey by Lieutenants Conder and Kitchener, R. E. Transliterated and Explained by E.H. Palmer. Committee of the Palestine Exploration Fund.
- Robinson, E.; Smith, E. (1841). Biblical Researches in Palestine, Mount Sinai and Arabia Petraea: A Journal of Travels in the year 1838. Vol. 2. Boston: Crocker & Brewster.
- Robinson, E.; Smith, E. (1841). Biblical Researches in Palestine, Mount Sinai and Arabia Petraea: A Journal of Travels in the year 1838. Vol. 3. Boston: Crocker & Brewster.
- Socin, A. (1879). "Alphabetisches Verzeichniss von Ortschaften des Paschalik Jerusalem". Zeitschrift des Deutschen Palästina-Vereins. 2: 135–163.
