= Burayr =

Burayr برير Bureir Ibreir
- Etymology: "The little wilderness"
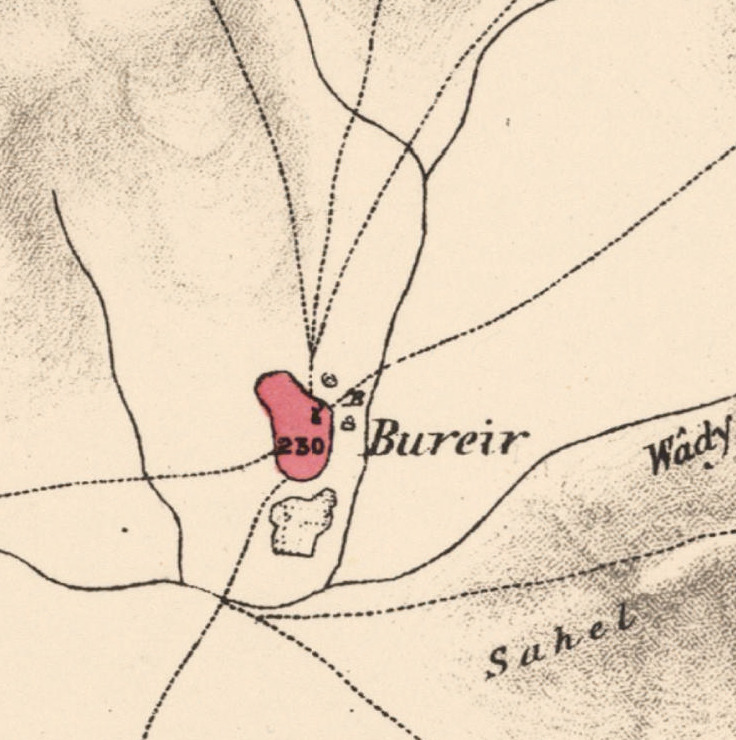
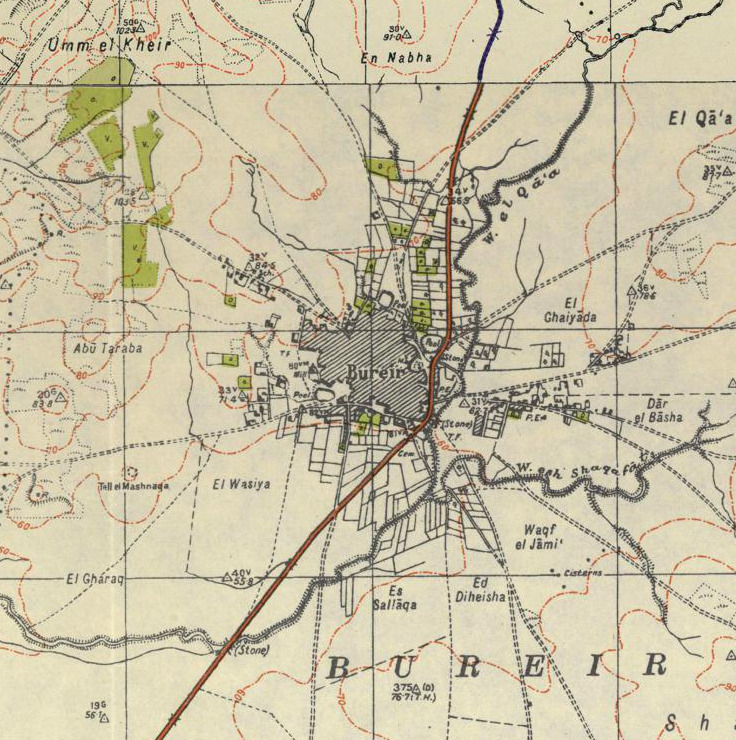
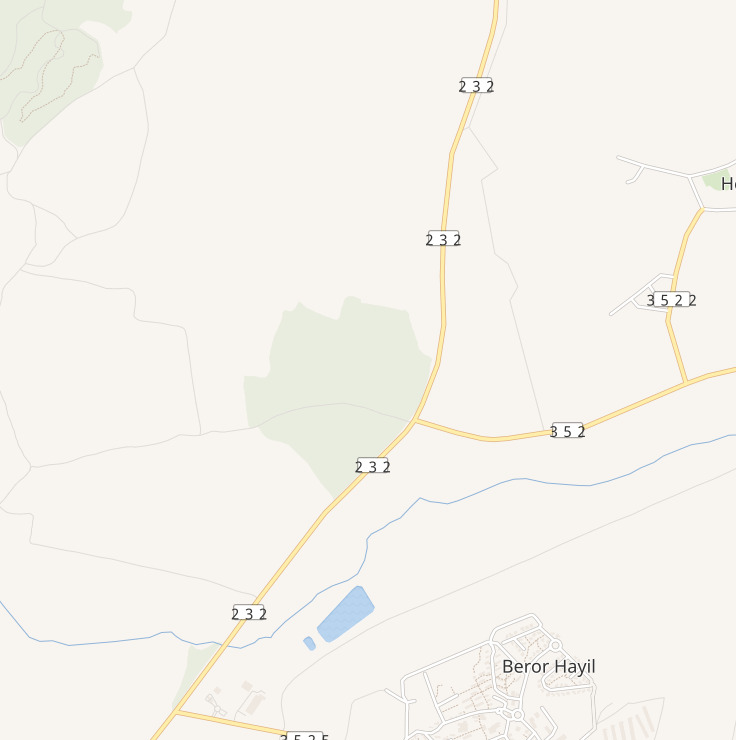
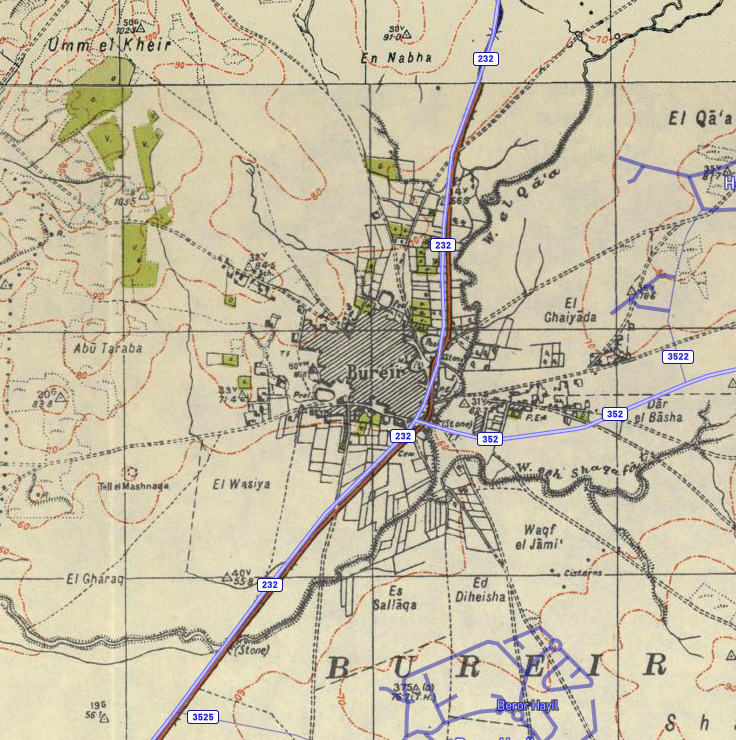
- 1870s map 1940s map modern map 1940s with modern overlay map A series of historical maps of the area around Burayr (click the buttons)

- Location within Mandatory Palestine
- Coordinates: 31°34′14″N 34°38′29″E
- Palestine grid: 116/108
- Geopolitical entity: Mandatory Palestine
- Subdistrict: Gaza
- Date of depopulation: May 12, 1948

Area
  - Total: 46.1 km^{2} (17.8 sq mi)

Population (1945)
  - Total: 2,740
- Cause(s) of depopulation: Military assault by Yishuv forces
- Current Localities: Bror Hayil, Tlamim, Zohar, Sde David, Heletz

Burayr (Arabic: برير) also spelled Bureir, was a Palestinian Arab village in the Gaza Subdistrict, 18 kilometers (11 mi) northeast of Gaza City. Its population in 1945 was 2,740. The village was the site of a massacre and it was depopulated and destroyed during the 1948 Palestine war as part of the 1948 Palestinian expulsion and flight. It had an average elevation of 100 meters (330 ft).

== Archaeology ==
In 2013, an archaeological survey was conducted on the site by Hardin W. James, Rachel Hallote, and Benjamin Adam Saidel, on behalf of Mississippi State University. On the basis of Philistine pottery from the 10th or 9th centuries BCE found in excavations of the tell, archaeologist Jeffrey Blakely of University of Wisconsin-Madison believes that Burayr may be the site of a Philistine village contemporary with the nearby Judaean hill forts.

== History ==
It has been suggested that the name Burayr reflects that of a Jewish town, Bror Hayil, mentioned in the Talmud as where rabbi Yohanan ben Zakkai lived in the Ist century CE and officiated over the rabbinic court. The present ruins lie some 400 m northeast of the eponymous kibbutz Bror Hayil.

In Byzantine sources it was named Buriron, and ceramics from the Byzantine era have been found here.

=== Middle Ages ===
The village's current name dates from the Arab conquest of Palestine in the 7th century.

In the ruins of the village was discovered Fatimid inscriptions dating from the 10th centuries.

During Mamluk rule, it was positioned on a main highway leading from Gaza to Bayt Jibrin, branching off the Via Maris at Beit Hanoun. Burayr had its own independent source for water, making it a desired rest place for travelers. In 1472–1473 CE, Sultan Qaitbay endowed Burayr for the benefit of his Jerusalem madrasa.

=== Ottoman period ===
Burayr was incorporated into the Ottoman Empire in 1517, and in the 1596 tax records, it was under the administration of the Nahiya of Gaza, part of the Sanjak of Gaza. It had a population of 210 household; an estimated population of 1,155. All the villagers were Muslims. The villagers paid a 40% tax rate on agricultural products, such as wheat, barley, fruits, beehives, and goats; a total of 32,000 akçe. 5/24 parts of the revenues went to a waqf.

During the 17th and 18th centuries, the area of Burayr experienced a significant process of settlement decline due to nomadic pressures on local communities. The residents of abandoned villages moved to surviving settlements, but the land continued to be cultivated by neighboring villages.

In 1838, Edward Robinson found that Burayr was "a flourishing village forming a sort of central point in the plain.. [It had] a large public well, at which camels were drawing water by means of a sakia, or water wheel with jars..." He further noted it as a Muslim village, located in the Gaza district.

In 1863, Burayr was described as a "large and prosperous village of 1,000" and all of its houses were made of mud, except for that of the village sheikh whose home was built of stone, and "round the well, which is broad and deep, ten ancient shafts in greyish white marble are built up in masonry, serving to make a trough."

An official Ottoman village list from about 1870 showed that Bureir had 167 houses and a population of 579, counting only the men. In 1883, the SWP described the village as large, with a water wheel to the east, a pool to the north and a garden to the south.

A flourmill was constructed at Bureir sometime around 1904 by a Jewish merchant from Gaza, al-Khudajah Hayyim, which was cooled by water drawn from a well dug nearby.

Burayr was strategically important in World War I and on November 9, 1917, was one of the first places captured by the Allied Forces from the Ottoman Empire, consolidating British hold on positions controlling the approaches to Jaffa and Jerusalem.

=== British Mandate of Palestine ===
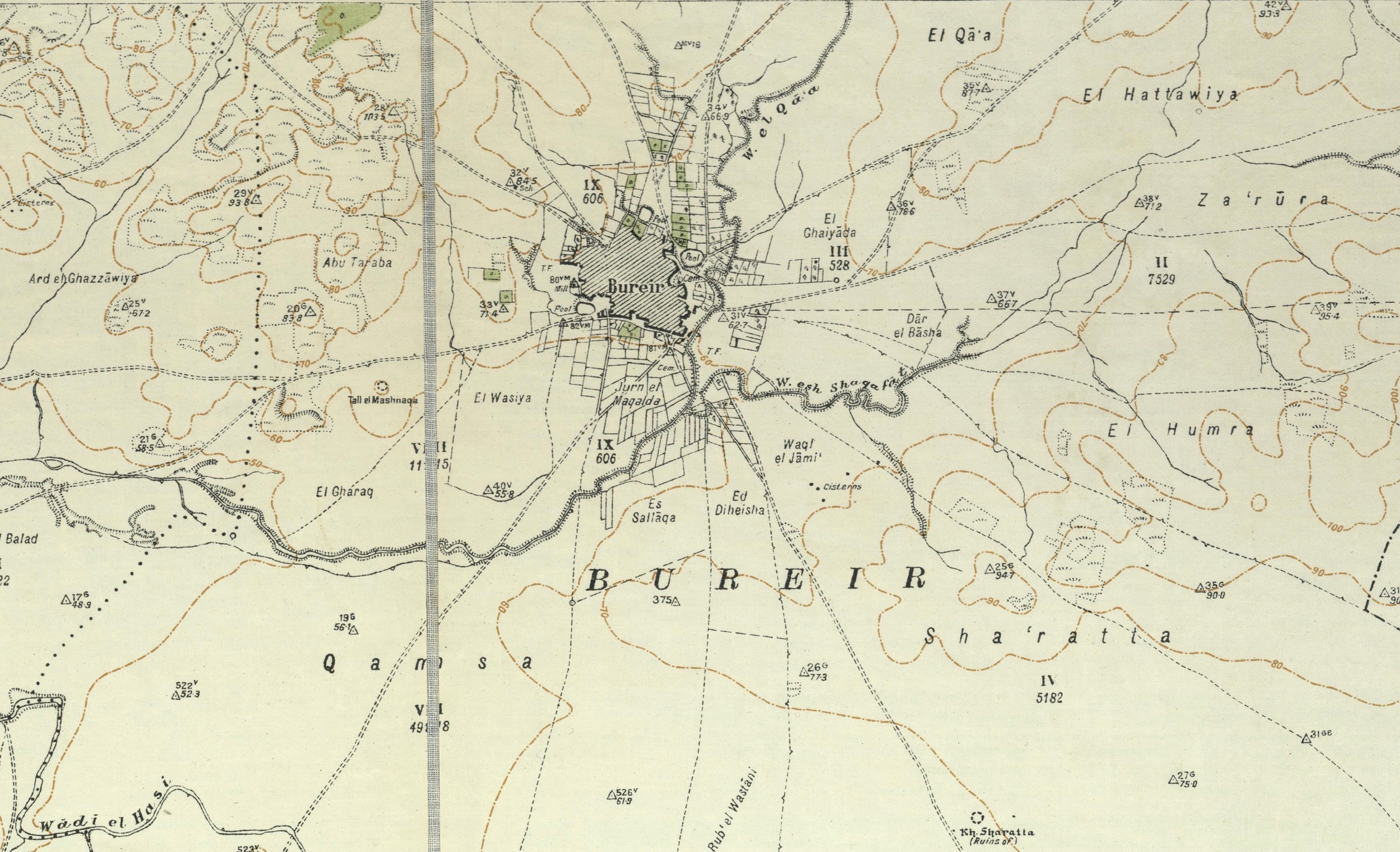
Burayr 1931 1:20,000

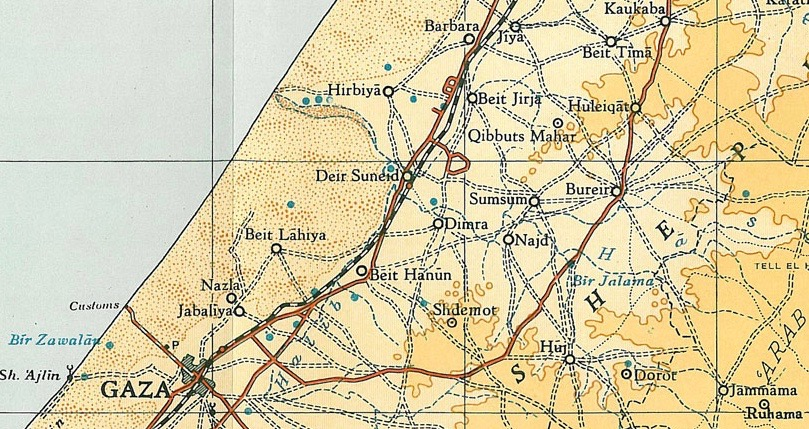
Burayr 1945 1:250,000

During the British Mandate period, Burayr expanded westward, a mosque was built in the center of the village along with a clinic and grain mill. There were two primary schools—one for girls and one for boys—founded in 1920. Water was supplied by three wells inside the village and toward the end of the Mandate, villagers had drilled artesian wells. The local economy boosted in the 1940s when the Iraqi Petroleum Company discovered oil in the vicinity of Burayr and drilled an oil well. The activities of the marketplace were supplemented by a weekly Wednesday market that attracted other villagers and Bedouin. Agriculture and animal husbandry employed most of the residents and the main crops were citrus, grapes, and figs.

In the 1922 census of Palestine, conducted by the British Mandate authorities, Bureir had a population of 1,591 inhabitants, all Muslims, increasing in the 1931 census to 1894, still all Muslim, in 414 houses.

In the 1945 statistics Bureir had a population of 2,740, all Muslims, with 44,220 dunams of land, according to an official land and population survey. Of this, 409 dunams were plantations and irrigable land, 43,319 used for cereals, while 130 dunams were built-up land.

==== 1948 war: depopulation and destruction ====
On January 29, 1948, Yishuv forces entered the village in five armored vehicles, but were repulsed without casualties. On February 14, an Israeli convoy exchanged fire with the local militia and withdrew. The villagers built a barricade at the entrance of Burayr which was dismantled by British troops the next day.

In May 1948 the village was captured by the Palmach's Negev Brigade and Givati Brigade as part of Operation Barak. Dozens of army-age villagers were apparently executed and a teenage girl was apparently raped and killed. The remaining inhabitants fled to Gaza. Historian Saleh Abd al-Jawad estimated that 50 civilians were killed in the massacre. (Note: Haaretz, 27 Feb 2026, Adam Raz, Terror Was Needed to Make Arabs Leave: What the Israeli Army Did in 1948, Revealed. Quotation: "Six massacres exacted between 50 and 100 victims: [...] in the village of Bureir north of Gaza.")

=== Aftermath ===
Following the war the area was incorporated into the State of Israel. The moshavim of Tlamim and Heletz were established on village land in 1950, with Sde David later established in 1955, and Zohar in 1956, both also on village land.

In 1992, the Arab village site was described: "Scattered cactuses as well as some lotus and sycamore trees grow on the site. One can see remnants of houses, including an insubstantial portion of a cement wall, among some eucalyptus trees at the entrance of one house. Some village streets are still visible. The lands around the site are cultivated."

== See also ==
- Depopulated Palestinian locations in Israel

== Bibliography ==
- Barron, J.B., ed. (1923). Palestine: Report and General Abstracts of the Census of 1922. Government of Palestine.
- Conder, C.R.; Kitchener, H.H. (1883). The Survey of Western Palestine: Memoirs of the Topography, Orography, Hydrography, and Archaeology. Vol. 3. London: Committee of the Palestine Exploration Fund.
- Dauphin, C. (1998). La Palestine byzantine, Peuplement et Populations. BAR International Series 726 (in French). Vol. III : Catalogue. Oxford: Archeopress. ISBN 0-860549-05-4.
- Department of Statistics (1945). Village Statistics, April, 1945. Government of Palestine.
- Guérin, V. (1869). Description Géographique Historique et Archéologique de la Palestine. Vol. 1:Judee, pt. 2. Paris, L'Imprimerie Imp.
- Hadawi, S. (1970). Village Statistics of 1945: A Classification of Land and Area ownership in Palestine. Palestine Liberation Organization Research Centre.
- Hartmann, M. (1883). "Die Ortschaftenliste des Liwa Jerusalem in dem türkischen Staatskalender für Syrien auf das Jahr 1288 der Flucht (1871)". Zeitschrift des Deutschen Palästina-Vereins. 6: 102–149.
- Hütteroth, W.-D.; Abdulfattah, K. (1977). Historical Geography of Palestine, Transjordan and Southern Syria in the Late 16th Century. Erlanger Geographische Arbeiten, Sonderband 5. Erlangen, Germany: Vorstand der Fränkischen Geographischen Gesellschaft. ISBN 3-920405-41-2.
- Khalidi, W. (1992). All That Remains: The Palestinian Villages Occupied and Depopulated by Israel in 1948. Washington D.C.: Institute for Palestine Studies. ISBN 0-88728-224-5.
- Mills, E., ed. (1932). Census of Palestine 1931. Population of Villages, Towns and Administrative Areas. Jerusalem: Government of Palestine.
- Morris, B. (2004). The Birth of the Palestinian Refugee Problem Revisited. Cambridge University Press. ISBN 978-0-521-00967-6.
- Morris, B. (April 2008). 1948 - A History of the First Arab-Israeli War. p. 307.
- Neubauer, A. (1868). La géographie du Talmud : mémoire couronné par l'Académie des inscriptions et belles-lettres (in French). Paris: Lévy.
- Palmer, E.H. (1881). The Survey of Western Palestine: Arabic and English Name Lists Collected During the Survey by Lieutenants Conder and Kitchener, R. E. Transliterated and Explained by E.H. Palmer. Committee of the Palestine Exploration Fund.
- Robinson, E.; Smith, E. (1841). Biblical Researches in Palestine, Mount Sinai and Arabia Petraea: A Journal of Travels in the year 1838. Vol. 2. Boston: Crocker & Brewster.
- Robinson, E.; Smith, E. (1841). Biblical Researches in Palestine, Mount Sinai and Arabia Petraea: A Journal of Travels in the year 1838. Vol. 3. Boston: Crocker & Brewster.
- Sharon, M. (2004). Corpus Inscriptionum Arabicarum Palaestinae, D-F. Vol. 3. BRILL. ISBN 90-04-13197-3.
- Socin, A. (1879). "Alphabetisches Verzeichniss von Ortschaften des Paschalik Jerusalem". Zeitschrift des Deutschen Palästina-Vereins. 2: 135–163.
- Tsafrir, Y.; Leah Di Segni; Judith Green (1994). (TIR): Tabula Imperii Romani: Judaea, Palaestina. Jerusalem: Israel Academy of Sciences and Humanities. ISBN 965-208-107-8.
- Saidel, Benjamin Adam; Hallote, Rachel; Erickson-Gini, Tali; Schecter, Bernard; Hardin, James W. (26 October 2021). "Excavations and Surveys in Israel:Preliminary report, Bureir". Hadashot Arkheologiyot. 133.
