= Operation Barak =

Zionist paramilitary operation in the 1948 Palestine war

Operation Barak (Hebrew: מבצע ברק, Mivtza Barak, lit. Operation Lightning) was a Haganah offensive launched just before the end of the British Mandate in Palestine. It was part of Plan Dalet. Its objective was to capture villages North of Gaza in anticipation of the arrival of the Egyptian army. It was undertaken by the newly formed Giv'ati brigade, commanded by Shimon Avidan.

== Background ==
Operational orders defined the Giv'ati brigades objectives as: "To deny the enemy a base ... creating general panic and breaking his morale ... cause the flight of the inhabitants of the smaller settlements in the area." Commander Avidan's instructions were: "You will determine alone, in consultation with your Arab affair advisers and Intelligence Service officer, the villages in your zone that should be occupied, cleaned up or destroyed." According to historian Benny Morris, Avidan preferred the latter option.
As a prelude, the Giv'ati brigade's first action took place on 4 May 1948 when the brigade occupied 'Aqir, south west of al-Ramle, population 2,480.

== Operation ==
The offensive was launched on 9 May with Bayt Daras being subjected to mortar bombardment prior to being occupied. Subsequently, village houses were blown up. A second round of attacks were launched on 15 May.

== Aftermath ==
Two months later the Giv'ati brigade carried out a further operation in this area capturing at least 16 villages and creating 'more than 20,000' refugees.

== Communities captured during Operation Barak ==
Name	Date	Defending forces	Brigade	Population
Aqir	4 May 1948	'hostages taken'	Giv'ati	2,480
Qatra	6 May 1948	villagers	Giv'ati	1,210
Bayt Darra	10 May 1948	n/a	Giv'ati	2,750
'Arab Suqrir	10 May 1948	n/a	Giv'ati	390
Barqa	10–13 May	n/a	Giv'ati	890
Burayr	12 May 1948	n/a	Negev	2,740
Al-Sawafir al-Shamaliyya	12 May 1948	n/a	n/a	680
Bashshit	12 May 1948	n/a	Giv'ati	1,620
Khubbayza	12–14 May 1948	n/a	IZL	290
Najd	13 May 1948	n/a	Negev	620
Al-Batani al-Sharqi	13 May 1948	n/a	Giv'ati	650
Abu Shusha	14 May 1948	n/a 'population fled'	Giv'ati	870
Al-Na'ani	14 May 1948	n/a	Giv'ati	2,060 inc. 590 Jews
Al-Qubab	15 May 1948	n/a	n/a	1,980
Simsim	15 May 1948	n/a	Negev	1,360 inc. 70 Jews
Al-Maghar	15 May 1948	n/a	Giv'ati	1,740

== See also ==
- Depopulated Palestinian locations in Israel

== Bibliography ==
- Walid Khalidi, All That Remains, ISBN 0-88728-224-5. Uses 1945 census for population figures.
- Benny Morris, The Birth of the Palestinian refugee problem, 1947–1949, ISBN 0-521-33028-9.
