= Or HaNer =

Kibbutz in southern Israel

Or HaNer: אוֹר הַנֵּר (Hebrew)
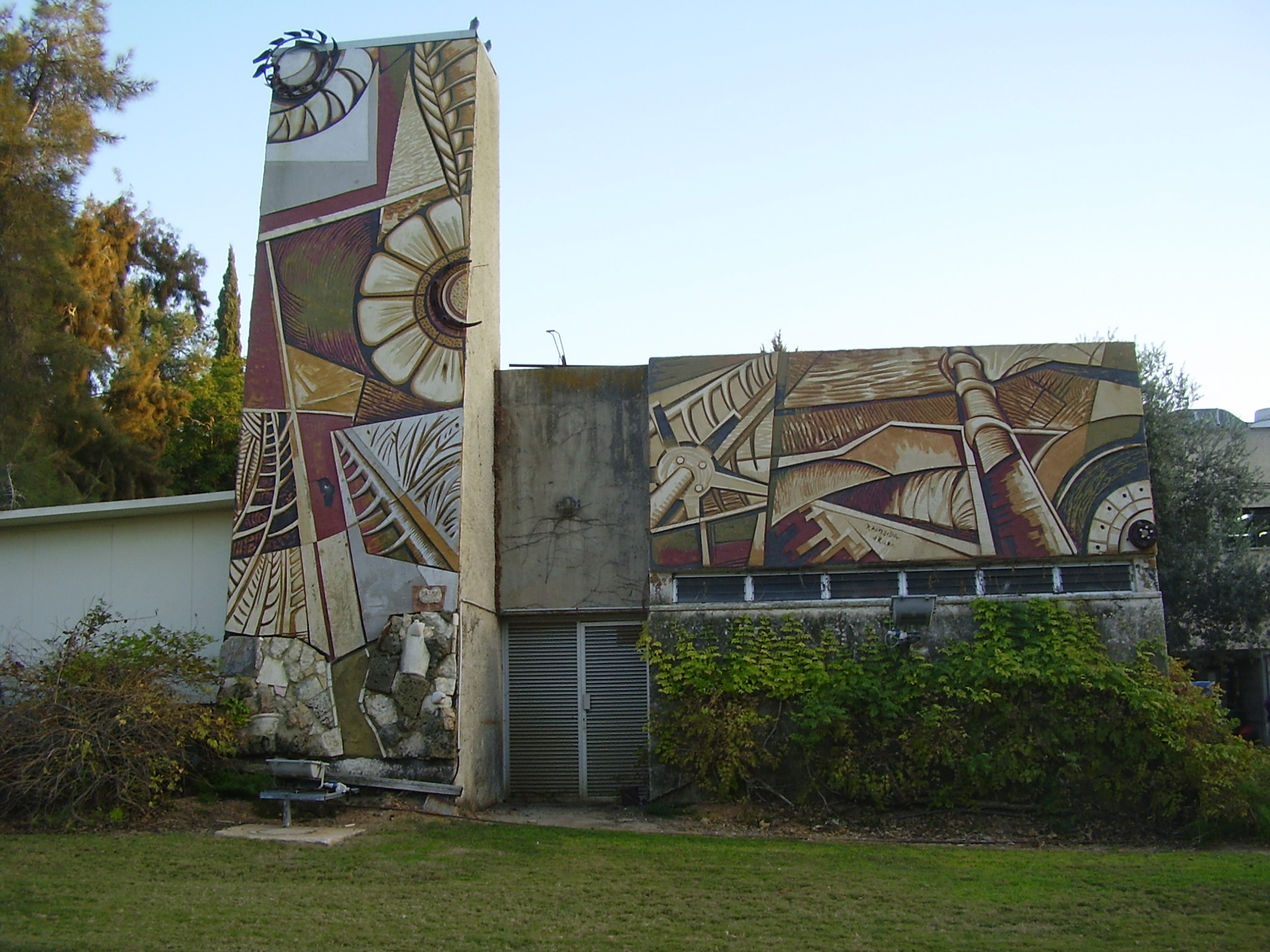
- Etymology: 'Light of the Candle'
- Location within Ashkelon region of Israel Location within Israel
- Coordinates: 31°33′27″N 34°36′7″E
- Country: Israel
- District: Southern
- Subdistrict: Ashkelon
- Council: Sha'ar HaNegev
- Affiliation: Kibbutz Movement
- Founded: 1957
- Founder: Former Giv'ot Zaid residents and Argentine Jews
- Population (2024): 1,047

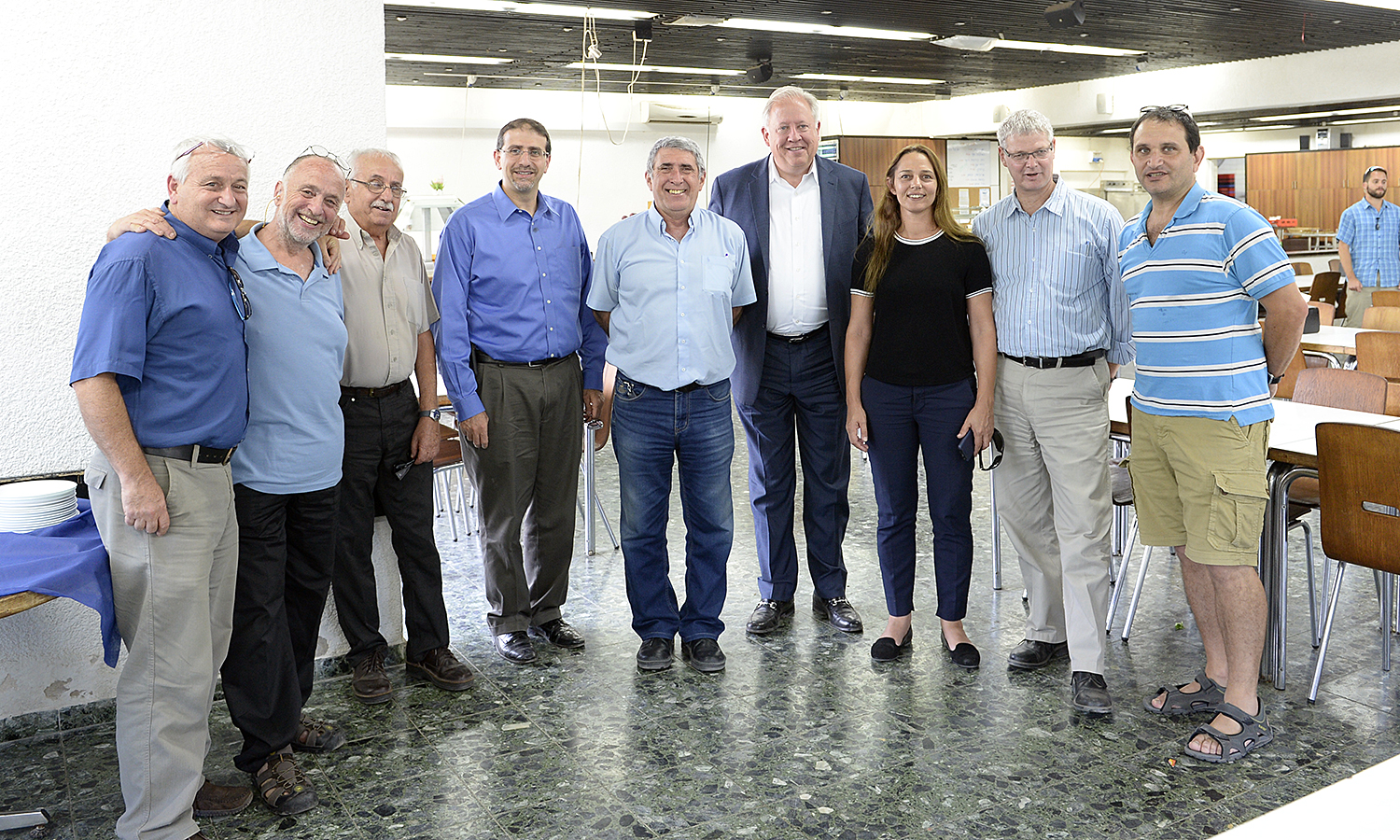
Thomas A. Shannon Jr. visits the kibbutz

Or HaNer (Hebrew: אוֹר הַנֵּר, lit. 'Light of the Candle') is a kibbutz in southern Israel. Located near Sderot, it falls under the jurisdiction of Sha'ar HaNegev Regional Council. In 2024 it had a population of 1,047.

== Etymology ==
Its name is taken from the Sanhedrin tractate of the Babylonian Talmud.

== History ==
Or HaNer was established between 1955 and 1957 as a farm run by the Yitzur u-Pitu'ah company. The founders were from the gar'in of the Gordoniya, Dror and HeHalutz movements, most of whom were immigrants from Argentina and Chile. Many of them originally came from the kibbutz Giv'ot Zaid. It was founded on parts of the land of the depopulated Palestinian village of Najd, northeast of the Najd village site.

A burial cave dating from the 4th century CE was found here along with a Greek funerary inscription.

In 2016 U.S. Under Secretary of State for Political Affairs Thomas A. Shannon Jr. visited the kibbutz and received a tour of the kibbutz's Ornit factory, which manufactures blind rivets.
