= Boris Carmi =

Israeli photojournalist

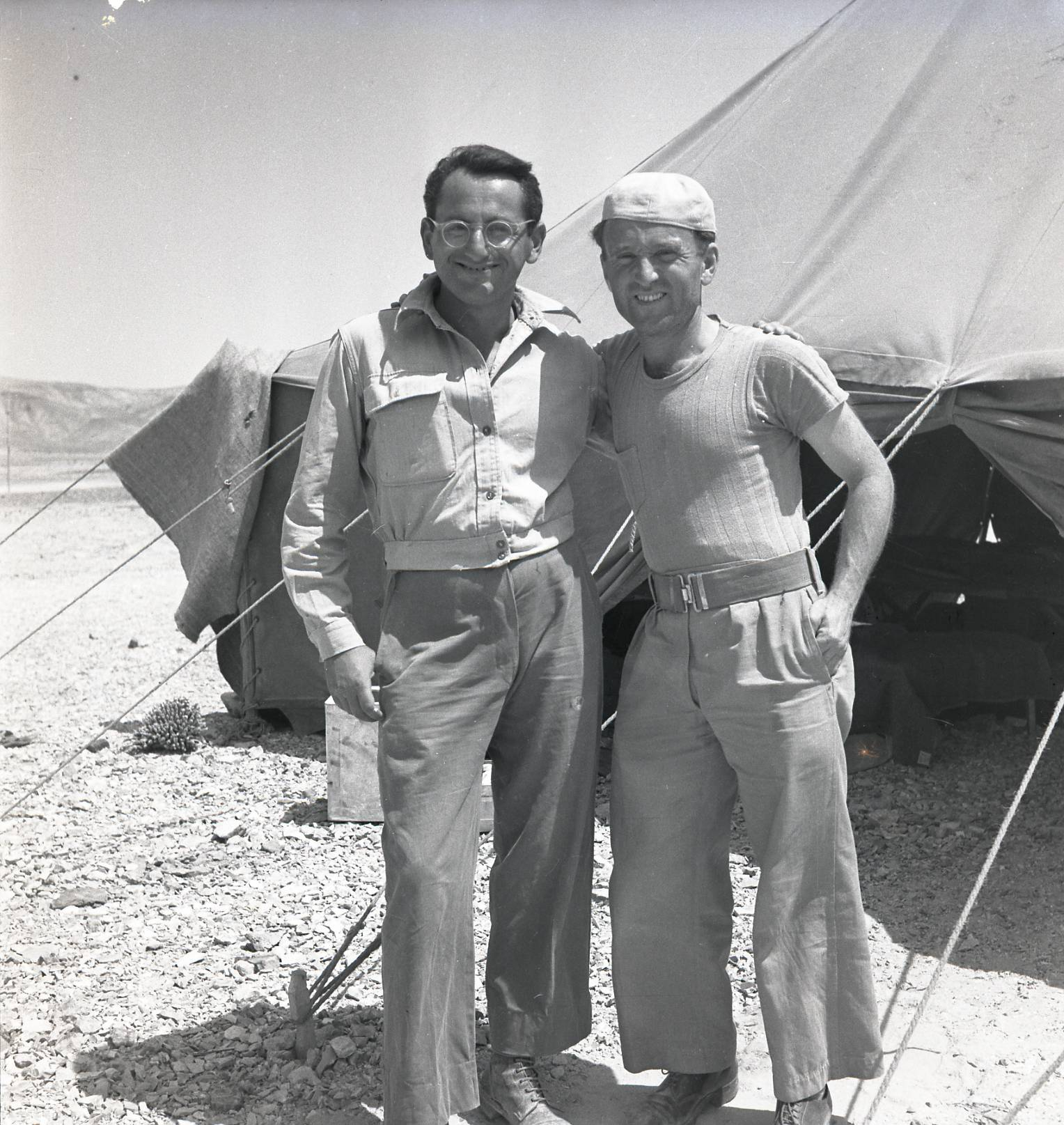
Carmi (on right) in 1948. Meitar collection, National Library of Israel.

Boris Carmi (Hebrew: בוריס קרמי; 1 January 1914 in Moscow, as Boris Winograd – 18 September 2002 in Tel Aviv) was a Russian-born Israeli photographer. He is considered as one of the pioneers of Israeli photojournalism and documented the very beginnings of the foundation of the state of Israel. His work totals around 60,000 negatives in all.

== Life ==
In 1930, aged 16, Carmi left Moscow for Paris, travelling via Poland, Germany and Italy. He then studied ethnology at the Sorbonne and at the same time began to take photographs. He travelled to Danzig in 1936, intending to emigrate to Palestine. He was granted permission to do so three years later and arrived there in 1939 aboard a freighter. He worked in a warehouse for several years until he could become a professional photographer.

During World War II Carmi served in the British Army, working on aerial photography and map-making in Italy and Egypt. A self-taught photographer, he was the first photographer of BeMahaneh, the newspaper of the Israeli Army, and documented the 1948 Palestine war and other contemporary Israeli history. He was one of few photographers active in Israel at this time and recorded historically important moments, construction projects, transit camps and waves of immigration as well as wartime scenes.

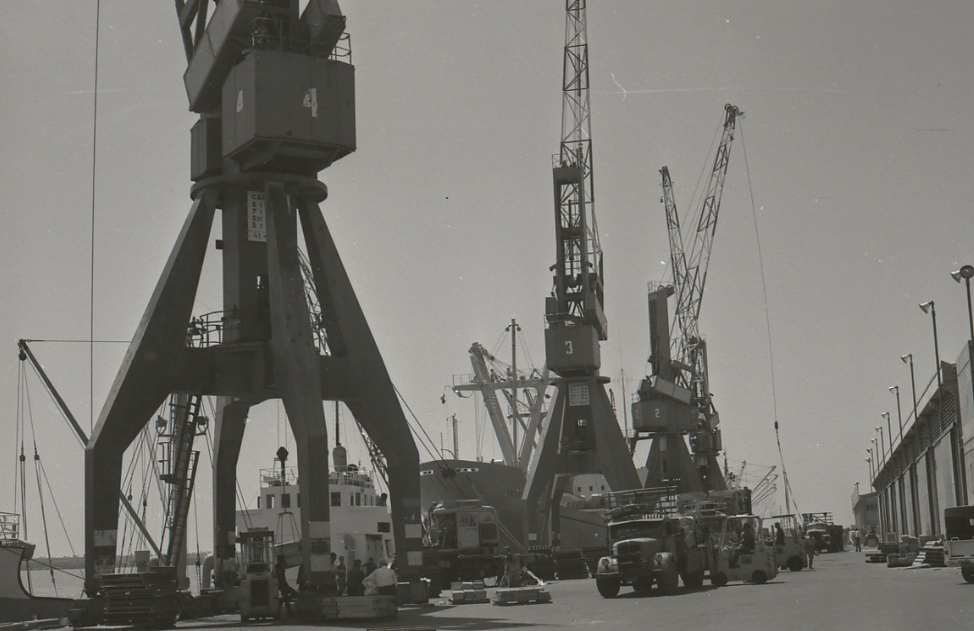
Ashdod, 1964, by Boris Carmi.

In 1949 he hebraized his surname to Carmi.

He worked for various newspapers and magazines producing reports on immigrants and their new beginnings and portraits of artists and politicians. From 1952 to 1976, he mainly worked as Chief Editor of a daily newspaper and a leading figure in the Israeli Press Association. During the 1956 war with Egypt he tended to photograph the deserted landscape of the Sinai Peninsula with Egyptian soldiers' bootprints rather than casualties or scenes of destruction.

In 1959 Carmi held his first solo exhibition in Tel Aviv. In the following decades he produced several further exhibitions and publications, including volumes of portrait and landscape photography and a children's book entitled The wonderful adventures of the flamingos. From 1960 he also started to photograph international subjects.

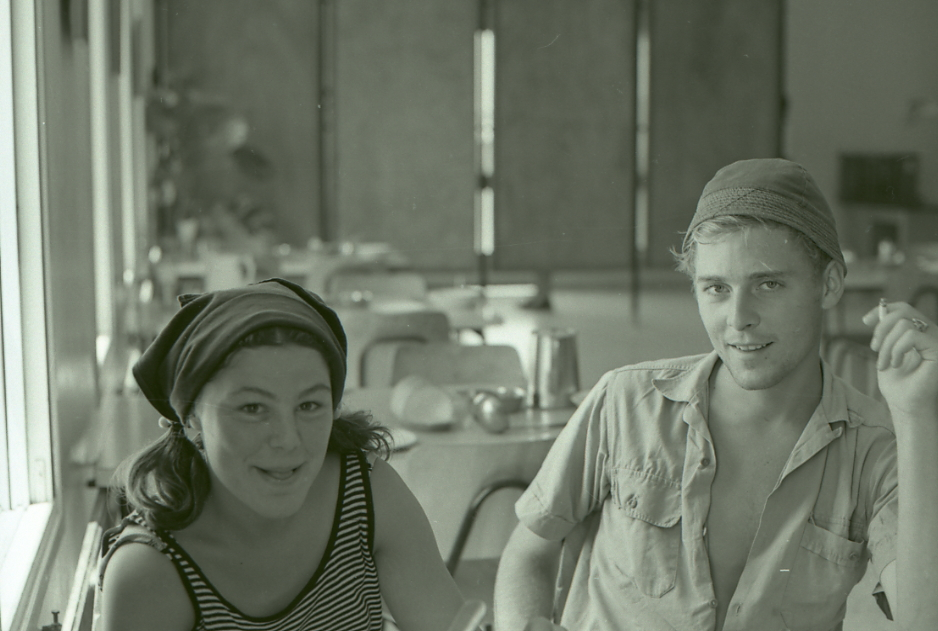
Neve Ur kibbutz, 1968. By Boris Carmi

He was given lifetime achievement awards from the Tel Aviv Museum of Art and the Israel Museum in Jerusalem. He continued producing photographs until shortly before his death. However, his first solo exhibition in Europe was held posthumously, at the Berlin Academy of Arts in 2004 and at the Jewish Museum Frankfurt in 2005. This showed over 100 images, under the patronage of Johannes Rau and Moshe Katzav.

== Bibliography ==
- Alexandra Nocke (ed.): Boris Carmi - Photographs from Israel, München, New York 2004, ISBN 3-7913-2933-2
