= List of Palestinian rocket attacks on Israel in 2012 =

The following is a detailed list of Palestinian rocket and mortar attacks on Israel in 2012. All of the attacks originated in the Gaza Strip, unless stated otherwise.

In total, an estimated sum of 2,257 rockets had been launched at Israel from Gaza in 2012.

== Summary ==
This strictly summarises the content of the article below.

Month	Missiles launched		Effect of missiles		Retaliation by Israel	
	Rockets	Mortars	Killed	Injured	Killed	Injured
January	9	7				
February	36	1			1	1
March	173	19		14	26	
April	10					
May	3					
June	83	11		1		
July	18	9		1		
August	21	3		1		
September	17	8		7		
October	116	55			8	2
November	1734	83	6	45	6	51
December	1					
Total	2,221	196	6	69	41	54

== January ==
In January, according to the Israel Security Agency's monthly summary, Palestinians fired 9 rockets and 7 mortar shells at Israel in 14 separate attacks.

January 1

Palestinians fired two mortar shells containing phosphorus into Eshkol Regional Council. The shells landed in open fields, causing no injuries or damage. The Eshkol Regional Council filed a formal complaint with the United Nations, noting that the Geneva Conventions prohibit the use of phosphorus against civilians.

January 19

After nightfall, Palestinians fired a Qassam rocket into the Sha'ar Hanegev Regional Council, causing no injuries or damage.

January 21

Overnight, Palestinians fired three mortar shells into the Eshkol Regional Council, causing no injuries or damage. In response to the attack, an Israeli Air Force helicopter immediately struck a group of terrorists in the Rafah area.

January 22

Palestinians fired a rocket into the Eshkol Regional Council, causing no injuries or damage. In response to this attack and previous ones, Israel carried out air strikes on a weapons factory in the central Gaza Strip, two tunnels in the northern Strip and one tunnel in southern Gaza, causing no injuries.

January 24

In the afternoon, Palestinians fired two Qassam rockets into the Eshkol Regional Council, causing no injuries or damage.

== February ==
In February, according to the Israel Security Agency's monthly summary, Palestinians launched 36 rockets and 1 mortar shell at Israel in 28 separate attacks.

February 1

Between about 6:30 and 9:16 pm, Palestinians fired 8 rockets into the Shaar Hanegev and Ashkelon Coast regional councils, causing no injuries or damage. Local residents were instructed to stay within 15 seconds of bomb shelters in case of additional attacks. Israeli security officials estimated that the attacks were so timed because of the stormy weather, which limits the effectiveness of rocket detection systems. Next day, Israeli warplanes struck six targets in Gaza in response to previous rocket attacks, hitting two weapons storage facilities, three tunnels used for terror activities and a weapons manufacturing facility.

February 6

Palestinians fired a Qassam rocket into the Sha'ar Hanegev Regional Council, causing no injuries or damage. The Color Red alarm sounded near in the area prior to the explosion.

February 10

After nightfall, Palestinian terrorists fired a rocket into a community in the Ashkelon Coast Regional Council. The rocket exploded between two homes, sending shrapnel that penetrated one of the homes while civilians were sitting in the living room. The rocket also damaged an electrical pole, cutting off power. No injuries were reported.

February 11

Palestinians fired a rocket into the Eshkol Regional Council, causing no injuries or damage. Israel responded to the attack and to the previous one with air strikes on three tunnels used for terror activity – in the south, center and north of the Gaza Strip – and a weapons manufacturing facility in the north. Officials in the Hamas-ruled territory said that one civilian man was killed and another was wounded.

February 15

Palestinians fired five rockets at Israel. Two rockets exploded in the Sdot Negev Regional Council, two more fell in the Ashkelon Coast Regional Council, and a fifth fell in the Eshkol Regional Council. No injuries or damage were reported. In response, the Israeli Air Force struck two targets in the Gaza Strip: a Hamas militant site in Gaza City, and a Palestinian Islamic Jihad militant site in Nuseirat. France condemned both the Palestinian attacks and the Israeli response.

February 17

Palestinians took advantage of the stormy weather, which hinders Israeli rocket warning systems, and fired two rockets into Israel. One landed in the Eshkol Regional Council, and the other hit the Ashkelon Coast Regional Council, south of Ashkelon. Later, Palestinians fired an additional rocket into the Eshkol Regional Council. No injuries or damage were reported in any of the attacks.

February 18

With the stormy weather continuing, at about 11:30 am Palestinian terrorists fired a Grad rocket at Beersheba; the projectile landed outside the city. Sirens sounded in Beersheba and the Bnei Shimon Regional Council, and residents entered shelters.

Palestinian terrorists later fired a rocket toward Israel, but it exploded instead on a Palestinian home in the Gaza Strip, causing no injuries.

Israel responded to recent attacks with an air strike on a weapons manufacturing site in the Gaza Strip.

February 19

After nightfall, Palestinians fired two Qassam rockets into the Sdot Negev Regional Council, causing no injuries or damage.

February 21

After nightfall, Palestinians fired a mortar shell into the Eshkol Regional Council, causing no injuries or damage.

February 23

Palestinians fired two Qassam rockets into the Sha'ar Hanegev and Eshkol regional councils, causing no injuries or damage. Residents of the former said that the Color Red alarm sounded only seconds before the rocket exploded, and some did not manage to reach rocket shelters in time.

February 24

At about 1 am, a Palestinian terrorist cell attempting to fire rockets at Israel was thwarted when an IAF jet fired at it. Palestinian sources said that two people were injured. At about 2:30 am, Palestinians terrorists fired two rockets into the Eshkol Regional Council, causing no injuries or damage. Israel responded with air strikes on two terror targets in the northern Gaza Strip.

February 25

In the evening, Palestinian terrorists fired two Qassam rockets at Ashkelon. One landed in an open area within the city, and the other landed in the Ashkelon Coast Regional Council. After nightfall, a third Qassam rocket landed in the southern Eshkol Regional Council. No injuries or damage were reported in any of the attacks. In response, IAF aircraft targeted a weapons-manufacturing site and a smuggling tunnel in southern Gaza Strip, causing no injuries.

February 26

In the morning, Palestinians fired a Qassam rocket into the Eshkol Regional Council, causing no injuries or damage.

February 28

Palestinians fired a rocket into the Ashkelon Coast Regional Council, near Ashkelon, causing no injuries or damage. The Color Red alarm sounded in the region.

Israel sent a demonstratively terse letter of protest to the United Nations, saying: "Ten days, ten rockets and not one condemnation".

== March ==
In mid-March there was a significant escalation of Palestinian rocket attacks on Israel. Throughout the month, according to the Israel Security Agency's routine monthly summary, Palestinians fired 173 rockets and 19 mortar shells at Israel in 156 separate attacks. However, according to a different report by the agency, during the escalation alone Palestinians fired 281 rockets at Israel, of which 86 were long-range.

=== March 1–8 ===
March 1

Palestinians fired three rockets toward Ashkelon. The projectiles landed in the Ashkelon Coast Regional Council, causing no injuries or damage.

March 2

Palestinians fired a Qassam rocket into the Eshkol Regional Council, causing no injuries or damage.

March 3

After nightfall, Palestinians fired a Qassam rocket into the Eshkol Regional Council, causing no injuries or damage.

March 8

On the morning of the Jewish holiday of Purim, Palestinians fired a mortar shell into the Eshkol Regional Council, causing no injuries or damage.

=== March 9–15 ===
Palestinians fired over 300 Grad missiles, rockets and mortars deep into Israel. Three civilians were wounded directly by the fire, one of them seriously. Additionally, 21 people suffered from shock and 11 were injured while fleeing for cover. A total of 23 Israeli civilians were injured. Israel's Iron Dome missile defense system intercepted many of the Palestinian-launched projectiles aimed at large cities, shooting down 56 rockets in 71 attempts.

Most of the attacks followed an Israeli air strike on Zuhair al-Qaissi, commander of the armed wing of the Popular Resistance Committees, a terrorist group with close ties to Hamas, and Mahmoud Hanini, a top field commander in the group. Al-Qaissi had overseen the 2011 southern Israel cross-border attacks, which killed eight Israelis including six civilians. Israeli officials said that he was preparing the final stages of a new mega-attack that could have claimed multiple lives.

To protect students from the rockets, Israeli officials cancelled classes in all schools in the cities of Ashdod, Ashkelon, Beersheba, Netivot, Kiryat Malakhi, Kiryat Gat, Gedera, Yavne, Lakya and other southern communities, as well as in Ben Gurion University of the Negev, Ashkelon Academic College and Sami Shamoon College of Engineering. The Home Front Command barred all mass gatherings in southern Israeli communities. The Israel Police raised the level of alert around the country.

Israel responded with air strikes on weapons storage facilities, rocket launching sites, weapon manufacturing facilities, training bases, posts, tunnels and terror operatives, killing 22 militants, mostly from Palestinian Islamic Jihad and the others from the Popular Resistance Committees. Four civilians were killed as well.

The United States, France, and an official from the United Nations condemned the Palestinian attacks, and the US stressed that Israel has the right to defend itself. The Organization of the Islamic Conference, the Arab League, Syria, Egypt and Iran condemned Israel's responsive air strikes on militants.

Details of individual attacks follow:

March 9

- Palestinians fired two mortar shells into the Eshkol Regional Council.
- In the early evening, at least four Grad missiles fired at Ashdod, Gan Yavne and Kiryat Malachi were intercepted by Iron Dome.
- Late in the evening, several rockets were fired at Beersheba. Some landed on the outskirts of the city, and at least one was intercepted by Iron Dome.
- Six Qassam rockets were fired on the Shaar Hanegev, Sdot Negev and Eshkol regional councils.

March 10

- During the night, a rocket fired at Beersheba damaged a building and activated air raid sirens. Residents fled to shelters. A second rocket fired at the city was intercepted by Iron Dome.
- Two rockets fired at Ashdod were intercepted by Iron Dome.
- A rocket fired at Beersheba from the northern Gaza Strip landed in an open area.
- Two rockets exploded in the Eshkol Regional Council.
- A rocket exploded near Sderot. The Color Red alarm sounded in the area.
- A Qassam rocket exploded in the Sha'ar Hanegev Regional Council.
- Two rockets fired at Ashkelon were intercepted by Iron Dome.
- Two rockets exploded in the Eshkol Regional Council.
- A rocket exploded near Netivot, while another landed near Sderot.
- Shortly before 2 pm, a Qassam rocket exploded in a farm in the Eshkol Regional Council.
- Two rockets hit the Sha'ar Hanegev Regional Council within the space of an hour.
- Two rockets hit the Eshkol Regional Council.
- Two rockets fired at Ashdod were intercepted by Iron Dome. The Color Red alarm sounded in the city.
- After nightfall, shrapnel from a rocket intercepted over Ashkelon by Iron Dome fell on a home in the city.
- A rocket landed near a farming facility in the Be'er Tuvia Regional Council.
- A Qassam rocket hit a stable near Kiryat Malachi, killing a horse.
- Two Grad rockets were fired at Ashkelon.
- Five rockets exploded in open areas in the Eshkol Regional Council.

March 11

Palestinians fired at least 39 rockets into Israel.

- In the morning, two rockets were fired into Israel, one into the Eshkol Regional Council and one at Ashkelon.
- Later in the morning, several rockets were fired at Ashdod, at least one of which was intercepted by Iron Dome.
- Shrapnel from a rocket fired at Beersheba and intercepted by Iron Dome fell on the city. A vehicle and a sewer pipe were damaged and several residents suffered from shock.
- A rocket hit a school in Beersheba, exploding in its courtyard and damaging its outer walls and disconnecting parts of the neighborhood from landlines. A second rocket landed in the middle of a residential neighborhood in the city; fifteen homes were damaged and several residents suffered from shock.
- Two rockets were launched at Ofakim.
- Three Qassam rockets exploded in the Eshkol Regional Council.
- Two rockets fired at Ashkelon were intercepted by Iron Dome.
- Two Qassam rockets landed in the Eshkol Regional Council.
- Late at night, four Grad rockets were fired at Ashkelon. Some were intercepted by Iron Dome.

March 12

Palestinians fired 42 rockets into Israel.

- During the night, seven Qassam rockets were fired into the Eshkol Regional Council. One landed in a village and damaged several homes and vehicles.
- In the morning, three rockets were fired at Beersheba. One was intercepted by Iron Dome and the two others landed outside the city. A warning siren sounded in the city.
- In the morning, five rockets fired at Ashdod were intercepted by Iron Dome. At least one additional rocket landed near the city. The Color Red alarm sounded in the city and surrounding areas.
- Two trucks that were transporting goods from Israel into the Gaza Strip were damaged by mortar shells on the Gazan side of the Kerem Shalom border crossing.
- A Qassam rocket landed in the Eshkol Regional Council.
- Two Qassam rockets landed in the Shaar Hanegev Regional Council.
- Around 1 pm, two Grad rockets exploded near Beersheba. Air raid sirens sounded in the city.
- Around 1:30 pm, a Qassam rocket fired from the northern Gaza Strip exploded in the Eshkol Regional Council.
- Around 1:30 pm, one or two rockets landed near Gedera. Two vehicles were damaged, and several people suffered from shock.
- Around 2:30 pm, three rockets exploded in the Eshkol Regional Council.
- Around 2:30 pm, a rocket exploded in Ashdod. Two people were injured by shrapnel, and several other people suffered from shock. Damage was caused to stores and a vehicle. Two other rockets fired at the city were intercepted by Iron Dome.
- Around 4:30 pm, a rocket exploded near Ofakim.
- Around 5 pm, a rocket fired at Ashdod was intercepted by Iron Dome.
- Around 6:30 pm, two rockets exploded in the Eshkol Regional Council.
- Around 8 pm, two rockets fired at Ashkelon were intercepted by Iron Dome. A third rocket landed in an open area. Air raid sirens sounded in the city.
- Around 9 pm, two mortar shells were fired into Israel.
- Around 10 pm, a Qassam rocket exploded in the Eshkol Regional Council.

March 13

Despite an informal ceasefire, Palestinians fired at least 7 rockets and 10 mortars at Israel.

- Before morning, a rocket exploded in the Shaar Hanegev Regional Council.
- In the morning, a mortar shell landed in the Ashkelon Coast Regional Council.
- In the morning, a Qassam rocket exploded in the Eshkol Regional Council.
- Around 10:30 am, a mortar shell fired at the Ashkelon Coast Regional Council set off the Color Red alarm in the area, but it apparently landed within the Gaza Strip.
- Around noon, six mortar shells were fired into the Eshkol Regional Council.
- Around 7 pm, a Qassam rocket was fired into the Ashkelon Coast Regional Council.
- Around 8 pm, a mortar shell was fired into the Eshkol Regional Council.
- Around 11 pm, a rocket exploded in a parking lot in Netivot. A 40-year-old man was injured by shrapnel, and 20 people were treated for shock. Several vehicles were damaged.

March 14

Around 7 pm, a Grad rocket fired at Beersheba was intercepted by Iron Dome. A second rocket landed in an empty field. Neither projectile caused injuries or damage. Following the attack, local authorities announced that schools in Ashdod, Ashkelon, Beersheba, Kiryat Gat, Kiryat Malachi, Gan Yavne and the Bnei Shimon Regional Council would be closed for March 15. Some schools had been open on March 14 after the recent escalation was perceived as having ended. Israel responded to the attack with air strikes on an infiltration tunnel and a rocket launching site.

March 15

Palestinians fired a barrage of rockets into Israel. The attacks were praised by Hezbollah Secretary General Hassan Nasrallah, who, in a Hezbollah graduation ceremony, lauded the fact that "the resistance was able to force a million and half a million of Israelis to stay in shelters". Details of individual attacks:

- In the morning, Palestinians fired a Qassam rocket into the Sdot Negev Regional Council near Netivot.
- Several hours later, a Grad rocket fired at Beersheba was intercepted by Iron Dome. Air raid sirens sounded in the area.
- After nightfall, a Grad rocket fired at Ashdod was intercepted by Iron Dome, and air raid sirens sounded in the area.
- Around 9 pm, a rocket was fired into the Eshkol Regional Council.
- Around 9:30 pm, a rocket exploded in the Ashkelon Coast Regional Council.

=== March 16–31 ===
March 16

Before morning, Palestinians fired a rocket into the Eshkol Regional Council.

March 19

In the morning, Palestinians fired a rocket into the Eshkol Regional Council, causing no injuries or damage.

March 20

In the morning, Palestinians fired a rocket into the Eshkol Regional Council, causing no injuries or damage.

March 21

In the evening, Palestinians fired a rocket into the Eshkol Regional Council. Later, a mortar shell was fired into the Sha'ar Hanegev Regional Council. This was followed moments later by a second mortar shell fired at Israel Defense Forces soldiers near the border fence. No injuries or damage were reported in any of the attacks.

March 29

In the evening, Palestinians fired three mortar shells into the Eshkol Regional Council, causing no injuries or damage.

== April ==
In April, according to the Israel Security Agency's monthly summary, Palestinians launched 10 rockets at Israel in 9 separate attacks. Two of these rockets were launched from the Sinai in Egypt.

April 4

After nightfall, unidentified terrorists in the Egyptian Sinai Peninsula fired 3 Grad missiles at the resort town of Eilat on Israel's Red Sea coast. No physical injuries or damage were reported, but some residents suffered from shock.

April 7

Israel aircraft attacked Gaza militants just as they were about to launch rockets into Israel, injuring two.

April 8

In the morning, Palestinians fired two Qassam rockets into the Sdot Negev Regional Council, near Netivot, causing no injuries or damage.

In the evening, a Palestinians rocket fired at Sderot landed in an open area, causing no injuries or damage. The Color Red alarm sounded in the city.

April 14

The Ayman Judah Brigades, a division of Fatah, the party that controls the Palestinian Authority, said they fired a rocket into Israel after nightfall. However, the Israel Defense Forces said that no rocket landed in Israel at that time. The Gaza NGO Safety Office, a project of CARE International, reported that a rocket fired at that time from east of Jabalia exploded prematurely.

April 15

Palestinians fired Qassam rockets into the Sha'ar Hanegev Regional Council and the Ashkelon Coast Regional Council. No injuries or damage were reported in either attack.

April 22

Palestinians fired a Qassam rocket into the Sha'ar Hanegev Regional Council, causing no injuries or damage.

April 23

In the morning, Palestinians fired a Qassam rocket into the Sha'ar Hanegev Regional Council. For unknown reasons, the Color Red alarm failed to sound. A second rocket was fired into the Ashkelon Coast Regional Council. Neither attack caused injuries or damage.

April 30

After nightfall, Palestinians fired a Qassam rocket into the Sha'ar Hanegev Regional Council, causing no injuries or damage. The Color Red alarm sounded in nearby towns.

== May ==
May 1

Palestinians fired a Qassam rocket into the Ashkelon Coast Regional Council, causing no injuries or damage. Israel retaliated by attacking a tunnel in northern Gaza.

May 9

Palestinians launched a Qassam rocket into the Sdot Negev Regional Council, causing no injuries or damage.

May 15

In the morning, Palestinians fired a Qassam rocket into the Sha'ar Hanegev Regional Council, causing no injuries or damage.

== June ==
In June, according to the Israel Security Agency's monthly summary, Palestinians launched 83 rockets and 11 mortar shells, 3 shooting at Israel in 99 separate attacks. Also had been reported that Two were killed and seven were injured,

June 1

Palestinians fired two rockets into Israel, causing no injuries or damage. The attack followed a separate incident in which Palestinian fighter Ahmed Nassir infiltrated Israel and opened fire on soldiers, leading to his own death and that of Golani Brigade St.-Sgt. Netanel Moshiashvili (21). Israel responded with air strikes on terror facilities associated with Hamas and Palestinian Islamic Jihad, killing one militant and wounding two others.

June 3

Palestinians fired a Qassam rocket into the Eshkol Regional Council, causing no injuries or damage.

June 5

Palestinians fired a mortar shell into the Eshkol Regional Council, causing no injuries or damage.

June 16

A 122 mm Grad missile launched from Egypt's Sinai Peninsula or Jordan exploded near Ovda in the southern Arava region.

June 17

Palestinians fired rockets into Israel. Israel responded the following day with air strikes on a weapons manufacturing facility in the southern Gaza Strip and a terror activity site in the central Gaza Strip. Also Israeli aircraft attacked a motorbike in the northern Gaza Strip, killing two Islamic Jihad operatives who were behind a series of recent sniper attacks along the Gaza border. An Israeli civilian, Said Fashapshe, 35, of Haifa, had been killed in by terrorists in the clashes. Additional Israeli airstrikes killed other two Palestinians.

June 19

Ten Grad rockets and over 30 Qassam rockets were fired into Israel, some by Hamas. Four people were injured by shrapnel during one of the attacks.

June 20

An estimated 65 rockets were fired into southern Israel. One of the rockets directly hit a home in the Sdot Negev Regional Council.

June 21

Seven rockets were launched into the Eshkol Regional Council And Ashkelon.

June 22

Two Qassam rockets fired from the northern Gaza Strip exploded in the Eshkol Regional Council. No injuries or damage were reported.

June 23

More than 20 rockets were fired into Israel. A 50-year-old resident of Netivot was wounded when a Qassam rocket directly hit a factory in the Sderot industrial zone. He received shrapnel wounds in his neck and was transported to Barzilai Hospital in Ashkelon.

June 25

Despite a truce, two mortar shells were launched from Gaza into Israel. landing in the Eshkol Regional Council.

June 26

Palestinians fired four rockets into Israel, of which two were intercepted by the Iron Dome system. A chicken coop was damaged.

== July ==
In July, according to the Israel Security Agency's monthly summary, Palestinians launched 18 rockets and 9 mortar shells at Israel in 28 separate attacks.

July 5

In the morning, Palestinian militants in Gaza fired a Qassam rocket toward Israel's Eshkol Regional Council.

July 6

In the morning, Palestinian terrorists fired a Qassam rocket into the Sha'ar Hanegev Regional Council, causing no injuries or damage.

July 9

In the afternoon, a Qassam rocket launched from Gaza landed in the Eshkol Regional Council.

July 16

In the morning, a Qassam rocket fired from Gaza landed in an open field in the Sha'ar Hanegev Regional Council.

July 24

In the evening, Palestinian militants in the Gaza Strip fired two rockets at Israel. One was intercepted over Ashkelon by the Iron Dome missile defense system. The second rocket hit open territory in the Ashkelon Coast Regional Council. There were no reports of injuries or damage.

July 25

A rocket was fired into the Ashkelon Coast Regional Council, with no reported damage or casualties.

July 27

Palestinians fired two projectiles into agricultural fields in the Eshkol Regional Council.

July 28

Two rockets fired from the Gaza Strip exploded in an open area in the Eshkol Regional Council. A woman was lightly injured while running to a shelter. No other injuries or damage were reported.

== August ==
In August, according to the Israel Security Agency's monthly summary, Palestinians fired 21 rockets and 3 mortar shells at Israel in 16 separate attacks.

August 5

A Qassam rocket hit Sderot, with no injuries reported.

August 6

A Qassam rocket hit the Ashkelon Coast Regional Council, with no injuries reported

August 7

At 7 am, a rocket launched from Gaza hit the Sha'ar HaNegev Regional Council.

August 8

A Qassam rocket hit the Eshkol Regional Council, with no injuries reported.

August 12

A Qassam rocket hit the Eshkol Regional Council, with no injuries reported

August 16

A rocket was launched from Gaza into the Ashkelon Coast Regional Council, with no injuries reported.

August 23

A rocket launched from Gaza fell in the outskirts of a kibbutz in the Eshkol Regional Council

August 26

Two rockets hit Sderot, and one hit the Sha'ar HaNegev Regional Council. Two people suffered from shock, and two factories sustained structural damage. Another rocket fell in open areas. An al-Qaeda-affiliated Salafi group, Jamiat ul-Mujahedin Bayt al-Maqdis, claimed responsibility for the attack.

August 27

As the school year was beginning, a Qassam rocket exploded outside Sderot in an open area. No harm was caused. An additional rocket landed in Sderot, and a third rocket hit the Sha'ar Hanegev Regional Council.

August 28

Two rockets and one mortar shell were fired from Gaza into the Eshkol Regional Council, landing in open areas. The attack marked the third continuous day of rocket fire from Gaza. Israel responded by carrying out airstrikes on two weapons production sites and a weapons warehouse in northern Gaza. The "Mujahideen Shura Council of Jerusalem" group claimed responsibility for an attack on Ashkelon with five Grad missiles. Two other mortars were launched during the evening, with no casualties or damage reported.

August 31

A rocket exploded in Sderot and directly hit a home. A woman developed acute stress reaction symptoms and received treatment. The house sustained damage. Another rocket exploded in an open area in the Sha'ar Hanegev Regional Council.

== September ==
In September, according to the Israel Security Agency's monthly summary, Palestinians fired 17 rockets and 8 mortar shells at Israel in 25 separate attacks.

September 1

- In the evening, Palestinians fired several rockets into Israel, hitting open fields in Ashkelon Coast Regional Council.

September 2

- Two Grad missiles were launched from northern Gaza. One missile exploded in a closed field in the Sha'ar Hanegev Regional Council after passing over Netivot.

September 4

- Two Grad missiles were launched from northern Gaza. One missile exploded in a closed field in the Sha'ar Hanegev Regional Council after passing Netivot.
- 21:35 a rocket fell near Eshkol

September 6

- At 5:40 A.M. two rockets fell near Netivot and the Sdot Negev Regional Council.
- At 17:47 a rocket fell near Eshkol.

September 7

- At 6:20 A.M. two rockets fell near Netivot.

September 9

- A Grad rocket was fired at Beersheba a little past 2 A.M., exploding in an open area.
- A Grad rocket was fired soon after the previous attack and hit two homes in Netivot, causing serious damage to both buildings. The rocket directly hit one of the homes, although the building was empty, and the second home was damaged by shrapnel. Its inhabitant managed to survive by finding shelter in the bathroom. Seven civilians were injured, and four people were treated for shock. Authorities in Beersheba and Ashdod announced that school would be cancelled the following day.

September 11

- 17:07 A Qassam rocket hit the Ashkelon Coast Regional Council.
- 18:56 A Qassam rocket hit the Ashkelon Coast Regional Council.
- 21:48 Two Qassam rockets hit the Sha'ar Hanegev Regional Council.

September 14

Two Qassam rockets hit the Ashkelon Coast Regional Council.

September 28

21:50 A mortar hit the Eshkol Regional Council.

== October ==
In October, according to the Israel Security Agency's monthly summary, Palestinians fired 116 rockets and 55 mortar shells at Israel in 92 separate attacks.

In late October, Sderot Mayor David Buskila began a hunger strike outside of Israeli Prime Minister Benjamin Netanyahu's office, protesting what he perceived as the lack of attention by the government to Israeli towns that suffer from rocket attacks and demanding that the government intervene in the issue. Five days into Buskila's hunger strike, the Israeli government approved a NIS 270 million plan to increase fortifications for all Israeli towns between 4.5–7 km of the Gaza Strip. Prime Minister Benjamin Netanyahu explained that "this will bring security to the southern residents. This is something which southern residents have been requesting for a long time."

October 1

According to the Israel Police, Palestinians fired a rocket into Israel. No injuries or damage were reported.

October 4

In the evening, according to an Israel Defense Forces spokesperson, Palestinians fired a Qassam rocket into the Ashkelon area.

October 8

On the morning of the Jewish holiday of Shemini Atzeret, Hamas, Palestinian Islamic Jihad and other terrorist groups fired more than 50 rockets and mortars into Israel. One of the rockets landed in a petting zoo in the Eshkol Regional Council, killing two goats and wounding nine other goats. A worker stated that the zoo was usually "packed with children" but was empty at the time because of the holiday. A residential building was also damaged, but no human injuries were reported. Israelis in the Eshkol Regional Council were instructed to remain in shelters for several hours. This marked the first time since June that Hamas, which controls the Gaza Strip, claimed responsibility for rocket attacks on Israel. The group's stated aim was vengeance against "Zionist crimes"; this was an allusion to an Israeli air strike the previous day against Muhammad Jerbi, a jihadist militant from Rafah, and Abdullah Mohamed Hassan Maqawi, a member of the Mujahideen Shura Council of Jerusalem, a Gazan militant group, killing Maqawi and injuring 11.

October 9

Palestinians fired 6 rockets into Israel. No injuries or damage were reported in any of the attacks.

- Around 6 am, a rocket was launched into the Eshkol Regional Council.
- In the afternoon, a Qassam rocket was fired into the Sha'ar Hanegev Regional Council.
- After nightfall, two Qassam rockets landed outside Sderot, and three Grad missiles landed outside Netivot.

Israel responded with an air strike on an infiltration tunnel in the northern Gaza Strip.

October 10

In the morning, Palestinians fired a rocket into the Eshkol Regional Council. Another rocket exploded in an open area in the city of Netivot. In the evening, a Grad missile was fired toward Netivot. No injuries or damage were reported in any of the attacks. Israel responded with an air strike on a Hamas training camp, causing no injuries.

October 12

Around 19:30, Palestinians from the Mujahideen Shura Council in the Environs of Jerusalem fired a Grad missile into Netivot, which exploded in the backyard of a family home. Shrapnel pierced the walls of the home and penetrated a child's bedroom. Though there were no physical injuries, two people were hospitalized for acute stress reaction. Israel responded with an air strike on two Mujahideen Shura Council terrorists riding a motorcycle in the northern Gaza Strip. One was killed and the other was injured.

October 14

Palestinians fired two rockets into the Eshkol Regional Council, causing no injuries or damage. In a separate incident, Israeli forces targeted Palestinians as they were preparing to fire rockets into Israel, killing one and injuring another.

October 16

Palestinians fired a rocket that landed near a home in the Ashkelon Coast Regional Council. The building was damaged and two people were treated for acute stress reaction. A second rocket landed in an open area in the Lachish Regional Council. Local residents were urged to stay close to bomb shelters. The attacks followed a threat against Israel by Sinai-based Salafist group Ansar Bayt al-Maqdes. Israel responded with an air strike on a base of Hamas' armed wing in the northern Gaza Strip, causing no injuries.

October 17

Palestinian terrorists fired at least seven rockets into southern Israel, one of which struck a kindergarten. The building was damaged, but no one was in it at the time and no injuries were caused. The other rockets landed in open areas. Israel returned fire at the source of the rockets and hit some of the terrorists, according to Palestinian media.

October 18

Palestinians fired a rocket into the Eshkol Regional Council, causing no injuries or damage.

October 22

Palestinians fired 7 rockets into the Shaar Hanegev and Ashkelon Coast regional councils. No injuries or damage were reported. In two separate incidents, Israel launched air strikes on Palestinians preparing to fire projectiles into Israel, killing two members of the Popular Resistance Committees.

October 23

Palestinians fired 3 rockets into the Eshkol Regional Council. No injuries or damage were reported.

October 24

Palestinian military personnel fired at least 80 rockets and mortars into Israel; most landed in the Eshkol, Lachish and Ashkelon Coast regional councils. Five people were injured; two of the victims were critically wounded and were evacuated by helicopter to Soroka Medical Center in Beersheba. A house was also reportedly damaged. At least 8 rockets were intercepted by the Iron Dome defense system. Municipalities in southern Israel cancelled school. Hamas, which controls the Gaza Strip, claimed responsibility for the attacks. Israeli air strikes on rocket launching squads killed four Hamas militants throughout the day.

October 25

Despite an informal ceasefire, Palestinians launched a mortar shell into the Eshkol Regional Council. No injuries or damage were reported.

October 28

Overnight, Palestinians fired two Qassam rockets into the Eshkol Regional Council. In the morning, a third Qassam rocket and two Grad missiles exploded near Beersheba. The Popular Resistance Committees claimed responsibility for one of the Grad missiles. The Beersheba municipality cancelled school; Mayor Rubik Danilovich explained that the decision resulted from experience, saying, "We've had four direct hits on schools, and each of those times was when we were told to resume normalcy." In the afternoon, another rocket landed near Ashkelon.

October 29

Throughout the night and morning, Palestinians fired 20 rockets and mortars at Sderot and the Ashkelon Coast Regional Council. Residents of these towns were cautioned to stay within 15 seconds of reinforced "secure rooms" for protection in case a rocket fell.

October 30

in 7:44 in the morning a rocket hit the outskirts of Dimona, no injuries or damage reported. That was the first time 45 km rocket had been used.

October 31

In the morning, Palestinians fired two Qassam rockets into the Eshkol Regional Council. One rocket exploded in an open area within a town, but caused no injuries or damage.

== November ==
In November, according to the Israel Security Agency's monthly summary, Palestinians fired 1734 rockets and 83 mortar shells at Israel in 633 separate attacks.

November 4

Palestinians fired a Qassam rocket into Israel, causing no injuries or damage.

November 6

Following the shooting and subsequent death on the previous day of a Gazan civilian approaching the border with Israel, at 10:20am Palestinians fired a rocket into the Eshkol Regional Council, causing no injuries or damage.

November 9

Following an Israeli incursion on the previous day into 'Abassan village and the killing of a 13-year-old Palestinian boy by Israeli gunfire, Palestinians fired two Qassam rockets into the Eshkol Regional Council, causing no injuries or damage.

November 10

Palestinian militants fired an anti-tank missile at an IDF jeep patrolling the border, wounding 4 soldiers. IDF forces responded with tank fire, killing 4 Palestinians on a football playground (aged 16,17,18 and 19) and wounding 38. Further airstrikes killed 2 Palestinian militants. Palestinians then fired 25 rockets at Ashkelon, Ashdod, Gan Yavne and other communities. The Iron Dome anti-rocket system intercepted at least one rocket aimed at Ashdod. IDF airstrikes destroyed several Palestinian targets which the IDF alleged were being used for military purposes, including a water tank, an electricity company office, a brick factory, a metal workshop, a concrete factory, a poultry farm, and an agricultural store, damaging several houses, and wounding 13 Palestinian civilians.

November 11

Gazan groups fired over 100 rockets and mortars at Israeli cities and towns. A barrage against Sderot, timed to coincide with the morning commute to work, injured 3 people. One victim, physical education teacher Moshik Levy, was moderately wounded by shrapnel and glass from his car windshield which exploded in his face. A fourth person was injured while fleeing for cover, and five more people were treated for acute stress reaction. Two homes, one in Sderot and one in the Eshkol Regional Council, were damaged by direct rocket hits. United States Ambassador Dan Shapiro declared that his country "supports Israel's right to defend itself and its citizens from these attacks."

November 12

After a relatively calm night, Gaza gunmen fired nine rockets at southern Israel. Seven rockets were fired at the Negev region and two towards Ashkelon.

November 14–21

Following the Israeli targeted killing of Hamas military chief Ahmed Jabari, Palestinians fired over 20 rockets at Israeli cities. For the first time, a Grad missile was fired toward Dimona, home to Israel's Negev Nuclear Research Center. Seventeen Grad missiles were fired at Beersheba. One rocket directly hit a store in the city, lightly injuring one woman. Another exploded into a car, setting it on fire. Several other buildings were reportedly damaged. Additional rockets were launched at Ashkelon and the Eshkol Regional Council. The Iron Dome defense system intercepted some 15 rockets. Israeli authorities asked residents within range of rocket fire to remain within 15 seconds of a bomb shelter at all times. Municipalities in the region, including those of Beersheba, Ashdod and Ashkelon, cancelled school for the following day.

On 15 November, all schools within 40 kilometers of the Gaza Strip were closed down, and 13 Israelis were injured during the night. One rocket struck an apartment in Kiryat Malachi, killing 3 civilians, including a pregnant woman. The victims were Mirah Scharf (25), Itzik Amsalem (24), and Aharon Smadja (49). 5 were injured in the same attack, including children and infants. A house in Ashdod and a school in Ofakim were also struck by rockets.

Over 1,456 rockets were fired at Israel between November 14 and 21. Rockets were fired at Jerusalem for the first time and at Tel Aviv for the first time since the first Gulf War.

As of November 19, over 252 Israelis have been injured in rocket attacks since the start of the operation, as reported by Magen David Adom, Israel's emergency medical services.

On November 20, two Israelis were killed by rockets, one soldier and one civilian. The victims were Corporal Yosef Partuk (18) and Elian Salam Id Alanbary (29).

On November 21, another soldier, Boris Yarmilnik (28), was killed and a bus was bombed in Tel Aviv. The bus bombing, which injured 28 Israeli civilians, was condemned by the UN, the United States, and several European countries, and was praised by Hamas.

A ceasefire was declared later that same day. Even after the ceasefire, in the next hour, 12 more rockets were sent into Israel from Gaza. Rocket fire continue till 23:00 with a minimum of 13 rockets fired after the ceasefire started.

November 22

Ynet reported that in 10:06 a rocket that caused air-raid sirens to go off in Hof Ashkelon landed inside the Gaza Strip.

== December ==
December 23

In the evening, Palestinians launched a rocket that apparently landed within the Gaza Strip.

== See also ==
- Civilian casualty ratio
- List of armed conflicts and attacks, January – June 2012
