= March 2012 Gaza–Israel clashes =

Israel Defense Forces military operation in the Gaza Strip

Operation Returning Echo
- Part of the Gaza–Israel conflict
- Map of Gaza Strip and Israel border
Date	March 9–14, 2012 (5 days)
Location	Gaza Strip and Southern Israel

Belligerents
Israel	Popular Resistance Committees; Palestinian Islamic Jihad

Casualties and losses
23 civilians wounded	18 militants and 5 civilians killed; 74 wounded (mostly civilians)

Operation Returning Echo (מבצע הד חוזר) was an Israel Defense Forces (IDF) military operation in the Gaza Strip from March 9 until March 14, 2012. It was the worst outbreak of violence covered by the media in the region since the 2008–2009 Gaza War (Operation Cast Lead).

On March 9, Israel carried out a targeted air strike in the Gaza Strip killing Zohair al-Qaisi, the secretary general of the Popular Resistance Committees (PRC). Another militant was also killed in the strike, as well as seriously injuring a man nearby. According to the IDF, though the PRC denies this, Al-Qaisi had overseen the 2011 southern Israel cross-border attacks, which killed eight Israelis including six civilians. Israeli officials said that he was preparing the final stages of a new mega-attack that could have claimed multiple lives. Palestinian militant groups retaliated by launching rocket attacks on Israel, with over 300 Grad missiles, Qassam rockets and mortar shells launched, of which 177 hit Israeli territory striking the major urban centers of Ashdod, Ashkelon and Beersheba, as well as smaller communities. Twenty-three Israelis were injured, all of them civilians, and schools throughout southern Israel were kept closed for most of the week to protect students from rocket fire. Israel's Iron Dome missile defense system intercepted many of the Palestinian-launched projectiles aimed at large cities, shooting down 56 rockets in 71 attempts.

Israel attacked with 37 air strikes on Gazan weapons storage facilities, rocket launching sites, weapon manufacturing facilities, training bases, posts, tunnels and militants, killing 22, mostly from Palestinian Islamic Jihad and the others from the Popular Resistance Committees. Four civilians were killed as well. Another 74 Palestinians were reportedly injured during the conflict, mostly civilians. Some deaths and injuries among Palestinian civilians during the escalation, which were reported as casualties of the clashes, were later shown to be unrelated to Israeli actions.

The United States, France, and an official from the United Nations condemned the Palestinian attacks, and the US stressed that Israel has the right to defend itself. The Organization of the Islamic Conference, the Arab League, Syria, Egypt and Iran condemned Israel's responsive air strikes on militants. On March 13, Egypt brokered a ceasefire between Israel and Palestinian militant groups. Hamas did not participate in the fighting directly, and insisted that all-out war would "be devastating to the Palestinian people."

== Background ==
On August 18, 2011, a series of cross-border parallel attacks and mutual cover was carried out in southern Israel on Highway 12 near the Egyptian border by a squad of presumably 12 militants in four groups. The militants first opened fire at an Egged No. 392 bus as it was traveling on Highway 12 in the Negev near Eilat. Several minutes later, a bomb was detonated next to an Israeli army patrol along Israel's border with Egypt. In a third attack, an anti-tank missile hit a private vehicle, killing four civilians. Eight Israelis – six civilians, one Yamam special Unit police officer and one Golani Brigade soldier—were killed in the multiple-stage attack. The Israeli security forces reported eight attackers killed, and Egyptian security forces reported killing another two.

== Chronology of events ==
=== March 9 ===
In the afternoon, a strike on a car in Gaza City killed Zohair al-Qaisi, the secretary-general of the Popular Resistance Committees, and his collaborator, Mahmoud Hanani. According to Israel, al-Qaisi was killed because he was in the process of organizing a large terrorist attack to be carried out on Israel's border with Gaza. Al-Qaisi was one of the masterminds of the 2011 southern Israel cross-border attacks, which killed eight Israelis. Hanani was one of the Palestinians freed from Israel as part of the deal to free Gilad Shalit in 2011.

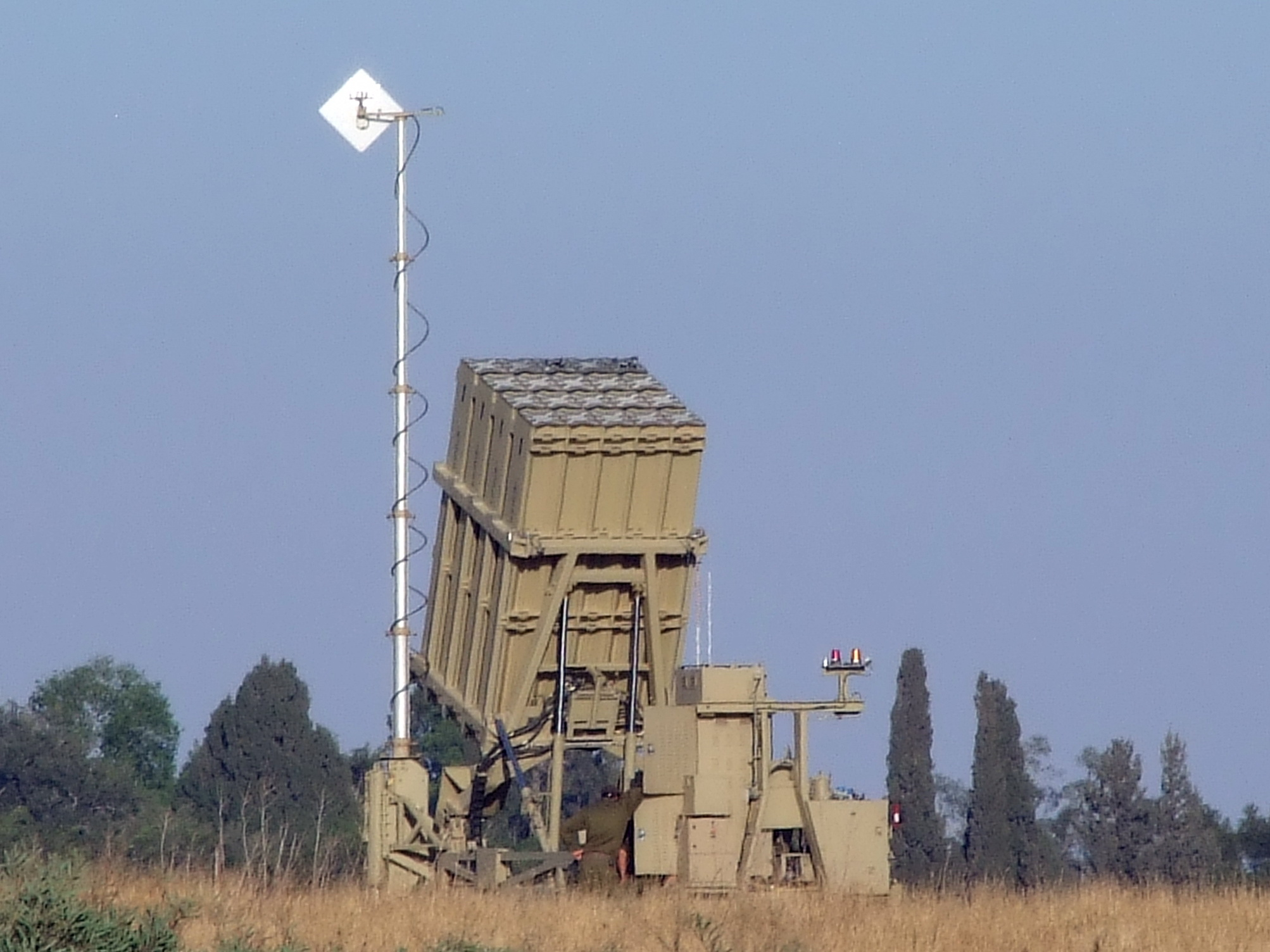
The "Iron Dome" anti-missile system. As of March 11, over a hundred rockets were fired on Israel in three days. More than thirty rockets were intercepted as of March 11, only those that were heading towards population centres.

On the same day, Palestinians increased the daily rocket barrage on Israel injuring three persons and causing a traffic accident in which two were wounded. The Israeli Air Force killed 15 more militants and a civilian in retaliatory attacks. The Iron Dome successfully intercepted 90% of the rockets targeted. On March 10, attacks on Israel continued, without causing damage. Several Palestinians were killed while preparing to fire rockets. Militants fired guns in the air and crowds chanted "Revenge, revenge!" during funeral processions in Gaza City. Particulars of individual Palestinian rocket attacks on March 9:

- Two mortar shells were fired into the Eshkol Regional Council.
- In the early evening, at least four Grad missiles fired at Ashdod, Gan Yavne and Kiryat Malachi were intercepted by Iron Dome.
- Late in the evening, several rockets were fired at Beersheba. Some landed on the outskirts of the city, and at least one was intercepted by Iron Dome.
- Six Qassam rockets were fired on the Shaar Hanegev, Sdot Negev and Eshkol regional councils.

=== March 10 ===
Particulars of Palestinian rocket attacks:

- During the night, a rocket fired at Beersheba damaged a building and activated air raid sirens. Residents fled to shelters. A second rocket fired at the city was intercepted by Iron Dome.
- Two rockets fired at Ashdod were intercepted by Iron Dome.
- A rocket fired at Beersheba from the northern Gaza Strip landed in an open area.
- Two rockets exploded in the Eshkol Regional Council.
- A rocket exploded near Sderot. The Color Red alarm sounded in the area.
- A Qassam rocket exploded in the Sha'ar Hanegev Regional Council.
- Two rockets fired at Ashkelon were intercepted by Iron Dome.
- Two rockets exploded in the Eshkol Regional Council.
- A rocket exploded near Netivot, while another landed near Sderot.
- Shortly before 2 pm, a Qassam rocket exploded in a farm in the Eshkol Regional Council.
- Two rockets hit the Sha'ar Hanegev Regional Council within the space of an hour.
- Two rockets hit the Eshkol Regional Council.
- Two rockets fired at Ashdod were intercepted by Iron Dome. The Color Red alarm sounded in the city.
- After nightfall, shrapnel from a rocket intercepted over Ashkelon by Iron Dome fell on a home in the city.
- A rocket landed near a farming facility in the Be'er Tuvia Regional Council.
- A Qassam rocket hit a stable near Kiryat Malachi, killing a horse.
- Two Grad rockets were fired at Ashkelon.
- Five rockets exploded in open areas in the Eshkol Regional Council.

=== March 11 ===
As of March 11, over a hundred rockets were fired on Israel in three days. More than thirty rockets were intercepted as of March 11, only those that were heading towards population centres. Overnight, IAF struck new targets in Gaza, killing two Palestinians.

Palestinians fired at least 39 rockets into Israel on March 11. Particulars of individual attacks:

- In the morning, two rockets were fired into Israel, one into the Eshkol Regional Council and one at Ashkelon.
- Later in the morning, several rockets were fired at Ashdod, at least one of which was intercepted by Iron Dome.
- Shrapnel from a rocket fired at Beersheba and intercepted by Iron Dome fell on the city. A vehicle and a sewer pipe were damaged and several residents suffered from shock.
- A rocket hit a school in Beersheba, exploding in its courtyard and damaging its outer walls and disconnecting parts of the neighborhood from landlines. A second rocket landed in the middle of a residential neighborhood in the city; fifteen homes were damaged and several residents suffered from shock.
- Two rockets were launched at Ofakim.
- Three Qassam rockets exploded in the Eshkol Regional Council.
- Two rockets fired at Ashkelon were intercepted by Iron Dome.
- Two Qassam rockets landed in the Eshkol Regional Council.
- Late at night, four Grad rockets were fired at Ashkelon. Some were intercepted by Iron Dome.

=== March 12 ===
On March 12, Israel carried out nine raids against military targets.

Islamic Jihad confirmed two of its members were killed. In another attack, five civilians were struck. A 16-year-old school boy was killed on March 12, though his death was later shown to be unrelated to Israeli actions. 24 people, including children, were wounded in a pre-dawn strike on Gaza city.

Schools in southern Israel remained closed.

Palestinians fired 42 rockets into Israel. Particulars of individual attacks:

- During the night, seven Qassam rockets were fired into the Eshkol Regional Council. One landed in a village and damaged several homes and vehicles.
- In the morning, three rockets were fired at Beersheba. One was intercepted by Iron Dome and the two others landed outside the city. A warning siren sounded in the city.
- In the morning, five rockets fired at Ashdod were intercepted by Iron Dome. At least one additional rocket landed near the city. The Color Red alarm sounded in the city and surrounding areas.
- Two trucks that were transporting goods from Israel into the Gaza Strip were damaged by mortar shells on the Gazan side of the Kerem Shalom border crossing.
- A Qassam rocket landed in the Eshkol Regional Council.
- Two Qassam rockets landed in the Shaar Hanegev Regional Council.
- Around 1 pm, two Grad rockets exploded near Beersheba. Air raid sirens sounded in the city.
- Around 1:30 pm, a Qassam rocket fired from the northern Gaza Strip exploded in the Eshkol Regional Council.
- Around 1:30 pm, one or two rockets landed near Gedera. Two vehicles were damaged, and several people suffered from shock. It is the most northern target to be hit by the Palestinians, located 28 kilometres (17 mi) south-east of Tel Aviv and 12 kilometres (7.5 mi) east of Ashdod.
- Around 2:30 pm, three rockets exploded in the Eshkol Regional Council.
- Around 2:30 pm, a rocket exploded in Ashdod. Two people were injured by shrapnel, and several other people suffered from shock. Damage was caused to stores and a vehicle. Two other rockets fired at the city were intercepted by Iron Dome.
- Around 4:30 pm, a rocket exploded near Ofakim.
- Around 5 pm, a rocket fired at Ashdod was intercepted by Iron Dome.
- Around 6:30 pm, two rockets exploded in the Eshkol Regional Council.
- Around 8 pm, two rockets fired at Ashkelon were intercepted by Iron Dome. A third rocket landed in an open area. Air raid sirens sounded in the city.
- Around 9 pm, two mortar shells were fired into Israel.
- Around 10 pm, a Qassam rocket exploded in the Eshkol Regional Council.

=== March 13 ===
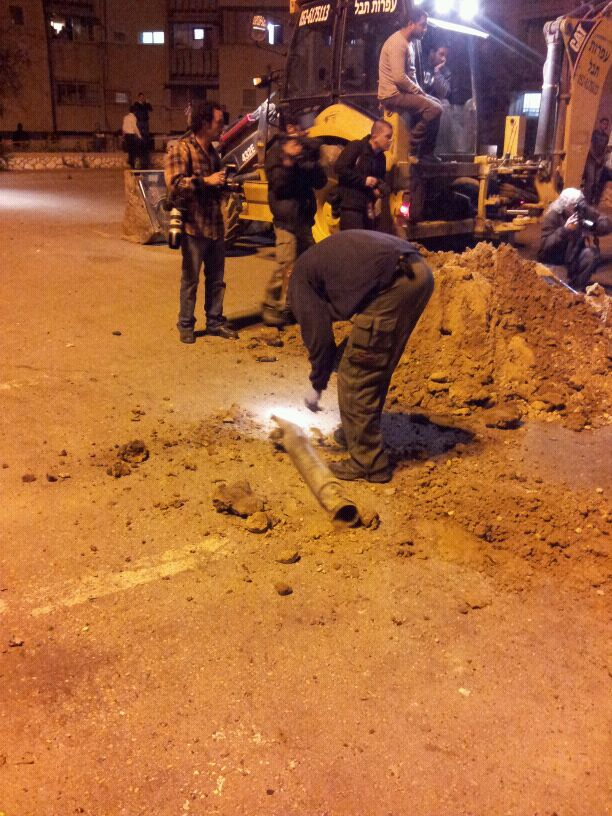
A rocket fired from Gaza hit the city of Netivot

An informal ceasefire was reached early on March 13. Palestinians fired at least 7 rockets and 10 mortars at Israel throughout the day. Particulars of individual attacks:

- Before morning, a rocket exploded in the Shaar Hanegev Regional Council.
- In the morning, a mortar shell landed in the Ashkelon Coast Regional Council.
- In the morning, a Qassam rocket exploded in the Eshkol Regional Council.
- Around 10:30 am, a mortar shell fired at the Ashkelon Coast Regional Council set off the Color Red alarm in the area, but it apparently landed within the Gaza Strip.
- Around noon, six mortar shells were fired into the Eshkol Regional Council.
- Around 7 pm, a Qassam rocket was fired into the Ashkelon Coast Regional Council.
- Around 8 pm, a mortar shell was fired into the Eshkol Regional Council.
- Around 11 pm, a rocket exploded in a parking lot in Netivot. A 40-year-old man was injured by shrapnel, and 20 people were treated for shock. Several vehicles were damaged. IAF aircraft struck targets in Gaza in retaliation during early morning of March 14.

=== March 14 ===
Palestinians continued to launch missiles into Israel. Around 7 pm, a Grad rocket fired at Beersheba was intercepted by Iron Dome. A second rocket landed in an empty field. Neither projectile caused injuries or damage. Following the attack, local authorities announced that schools in Ashdod, Ashkelon, Beersheba, Kiryat Gat, Kiryat Malachi, Gan Yavne and the Bnei Shimon Regional Council would be closed for March 15. Some schools had been open on March 14 after the recent escalation was perceived as having ended. Israel responded to the attack with air strikes on an infiltration tunnel and a rocket launching site.

=== March 15 ===
Palestinians fired a barrage of rockets into Israel. The attacks were praised by Hezbollah Secretary General Hassan Nasrallah, who, in a Hezbollah graduation ceremony, lauded the fact that "the resistance was able to force a million and half a million of Israelis to stay in shelters". Details of individual attacks:

- In the morning, Palestinians fired a Qassam rocket into the Sdot Negev Regional Council near Netivot.
- Several hours later, a Grad rocket fired at Beersheba was intercepted by Iron Dome. Air raid sirens sounded in the area.
- After nightfall, a Grad rocket fired at Ashdod was intercepted by Iron Dome, and air raid sirens sounded in the area.
- Around 9 pm, a rocket was fired into the Eshkol Regional Council.
- Around 9:30 pm, a rocket exploded in the Ashkelon Coast Regional Council.

=== March 16 ===
Palestinians fired a rocket into the Eshkol Regional Council.

=== March 19 ===
Palestinians fired a rocket into the Eshkol Regional Council, causing no injuries or damage.

=== March 20 ===
Palestinians fired a rocket into the Eshkol Regional Council, causing no injuries or damage.

=== March 21 ===
Palestinians fired a rocket into the Eshkol Regional Council. Later, a mortar shell was fired into the Sha'ar Hanegev Regional Council. This was followed moments later by a second mortar shell fired at Israel Defense Forces soldiers near the border fence. No injuries or damage were reported in any of the attacks.

=== March 29 ===
Palestinians fired three mortar shells into the Eshkol Regional Council, causing no injuries or damage.

== Disputed incidents ==
On 12 March, 16-year-old Nayef Qarmut was killed and six other teenagers were injured in an apparent explosion near Beit Lahiya in the Gaza Strip. Adham Abu Selmiya, a spokesman for medical services in the Hamas-ruled territory, said that Qarmut was killed by an Israeli air strike. The Israel Defense Forces, however, denied that any air strikes had taken place in that time and location. An Agence France-Presse correspondent at the scene said there were no signs of any impact consistent with an air strike, and that the most likely cause of the teen's death was an explosive device he was carrying.

On 14 March, Adham Abu Selmiya said that 8-year-old Barka al-Mugrahbi died of wounds sustained in the same purported air strike which he had said killed Nayef Qarmut. However, on the same day, witnesses and relatives said that the boy was killed by being struck in the head by an errant bullet when gunmen were firing in the air during a Gazan funeral procession for a militant. Abu Selmiya corrected his account, blaming his original account on "wrong information" from the hospital.

== Iron Dome ==
About 300 rockets being fired by militants from Gaza. On 10 March 2012, The Jerusalem Post reported an Iron Dome success rate of shooting down 90% of rockets launched from Gaza the system engaged (rockets which will land in unpopulated areas are ignored) and there were no Israeli casualties, whether civilian or military. The success of the Iron Dome system was widely acclaimed on the Israeli side.

== Reactions ==
The United Nations, the United States and France condemned the Palestinian attacks, and the US stressed that Israel has the right to defend itself. The Organization of the Islamic Conference, the Arab League and Egypt condemned Israel's air strikes on militants.

The result, according to Leor Sapir, brought five strategic benefits to Israel: (1) it enabled a new weapon system to be tested in an authentic operational setting: (2) it provided crucial data to check if Iron Dome's technology met its original expectations. (3) It inspired both confidence in the system's capabilities and set realistic expectations: (4) It enabled, in a controlled conflict to get the Gaza terrorist infrastructure to waste a significant number of rockets: (5) Above all, activating Iron Dome has a deterrent effect by sending with its 76% hit-rate a powerful message to Iran and Hezbollah.

== Twitter incidents ==
Some images of children in the conflict were outdated and caused controversy. During the March 2012 Gaza-Israel clashes, Ofir Gendelman, a spokesman for Israeli Prime Minister Benjamin Netanyahu, tweeted a photo of an Israeli woman and her two children ducking a Gaza rocket describing it as "when a rocket fired by terrorists from Gaza is about to hit their home." When it was proved the photo was from 2009 he said "I never stated that the photo was current." During that period Khulood Badawi, an Information and Media Coordinator for the United Nations Office for the Coordination of Humanitarian Affairs, tweeted a picture of a Palestinian child covered in blood. She was criticized because the child was killed in 2006, allegedly in an accident. She later tweeted that she mistakenly had tweeted an old photo. Ma'an News Agency reported a week later that the hospital medical report on the dead girl read that she died “due to falling from a high area during the Israeli strike on Gaza”. There are differing accounts of how the Israeli air strike, reported to be as little as 100 meters away, may have caused the accident. Israel has denied having any involvement in the girl's death.

== List of Palestinian militants killed ==
1. Zohair al-Qaisi, commander of the Popular Resistance Committees (PRC), killed in initial air strike on 9 March.
2. Ahmad Hanini, senior PRC member, killed in same air strike.
3. Hussein Barham Al-Breim (51), of the PRC, killed while on his motorcycle east of Khan Yunis on 10 March.
4. Mansour Kamal Abu Nuseira (20), of the PRC, killed in same air strike.
5. Mahdi Abu Shawish (24), of the PRC, killed in Rafah later on 10 March.
6. Ahmad Hajjaj, of Palestinian Islamic Jihad (PIJ), killed in his car in Gaza City on 10 March.
7. Fayiq Saad, of PIJ, killed in same air strike.
8. Muatasim Hajjaj, of PIJ, killed in same air strike.
9. Shadi Sayqali, of PIJ .
10. Hazim Qureiqi, of PIJ.
11. Ubeid Gharably, of PIJ.
12. Muhammad Hararah, of PIJ.
13. Muhammad Maghari, of PIJ, killed in Beit Lahiya on 10 March, according to PIJ.
14. Mahmoud Najim, of PIJ, killed in same air strike, according to PIJ.
15. Muhammad al-Ghamry (26), of PIJ, killed on 10 March.
16. Ahmed Deeb Salem (24), of the PRC, killed in Gaza City on 11 March, according to the PRC.
17. Raafat Abu Eid (24), of PIJ, killed in his vehicle in Khan Yunis on 12 March.
18. Hamadah Salman Abu Mutlaq (24), killed east of Khan Yunis on 12 March.
19. Bassam al-Ajla, of PIJ, killed east of Gaza City later on 12 March, while preparing to fire a rocket at Israel.
20. Muhammad Thaher, of PIJ, killed in same air strike.

== See also ==
- Palestinian Islamic Jihad (PIJ)
- List of Palestinian rocket attacks on Israel, 2012
- Operation Pillar of Defense
