= Zuhir al-Qaisi =

Palestinian politician (1963–2012)

- زهير القيسي

Secretary General of the Popular Resistance Committees
- In office August 2011 – 9 March 2012
- Preceded by: Kamal al-Nirab

Personal details
- Born: 1 January 1963
- Died: 9 March 2012 (aged 49) Tel al-Hawa, Gaza
- Party: Popular Resistance Committees
- Nickname: Abu Ibrahim

Military service
- Unit: Al-Nasser Salah al-Deen Brigades

Zuhair al-Qaisi (Arabic: زهير القيسي; 1963 – 9 March 2012), also known by his nom de guerre Abu Ibrahim, was a Palestinian politician who was the secretary general of the Popular Resistance Committees in Gaza. He was killed by the Israel Defense Forces (IDF).

al-Qaisi was a member of the Popular Resistance Committees since their establishment in 2000. The Popular Resistance Committees were one of three organizations responsible for the capture of Gilad Shalit. Interviewed regarding Shalit's capture and imprisonment, al-Qaisi is said to have stated that "Israel has tried to pressure us by killing a large number of activists following the abduction, but the resistance and the Palestinians have held their ground".

According to the IDF, though the claim is denied by the PRC, al-Qaisi was one of the masterminds of the 2011 southern Israel cross-border attacks in August 2011, in which eight Israelis were killed. Following this attack, the IDF killed the secretary general of the Popular Resistance Committees, Kamal al-Nirab, and al-Qaisi was appointed his successor. On 14 January 2012 an explosion at al-Qaisi's home, in Rafah killed one member of his family, Khalid al-Qaisi, and wounded five others. Zuhir al-Qaisi himself was not at home at the time.

On 9 March 2012, al-Qaisi was killed in a missile strike by IDF aircraft, while driving his Opel car in the Tel al-Hawa neighborhood west of Gaza. His son-in-law, Mohammed Ahmed al-Hanani, a resident of Beit Furik near Nablus, was also killed in the attack, and a third man was seriously injured. The killing of Hanini was, according to the Egyptian ambassador to Ramallah Yasser Osman and a Hamas spokesman, in violation of the terms of agreement in the Shalit prisoner swap. The government and the Israeli security establishment justified the targeted assassination by explaining at the time that al-Qaisi had been planning a terrorist attack against Israel that was in the final stages of preparation. Sources among the Popular Resistance Committees in Gaza say that they had been tipped off a month earlier that Israel was planning to kill him.

Zvi Bar'el, writing for Haaretz, argued that the escalation was seen as good for Israel and that the events in Gaza were part of a plan to 'sell' an Israeli attack on Iran. Al-Hayat, surveying several possible reasons for the attack, argued that 'marketing the Iron Dome' project and testing Hamas's military capabilities played some role in Israeli defence calculations for the killing. Neve Gordon, surveying the opinions of several analysts in the Israeli press, cites, among others, Maariv's Ofer Shelah for the view that statements by the Minister of Defense, Ehud Barak gave the impression that Qaisi's assassination was not directly preemptive, since Barak explicitly said that what al-Qaisi was planning, and where the attack was to be launched, and whether an imminent attack had been foiled, was not clear, and that the attack was more about deterrence. Gordon also reports that several commentators argued that the assassination had been planned well in advance, the ambush itself being prepared a week beforehand, and that its execution had been delayed until Prime Minister Benjamin Netanyahu returned from his diplomatic visit to Washington, Purim festivities had passed, and the weather had cleared up.

As a response to the targeted assassination, a barrage of rockets was launched from Gaza, resulting in the March 2012 Gaza–Israel clashes. Yossi Klein, writing in Haaretz, argued that people in Tel Aviv were sceptical of the stories given out by government spokesmen and concluded that:-

The death of Zahid al-Kaisi met the criteria of cost-benefit analysis well. A few days of fear in Sderot are a small investment that will bring a big profit in terms of punishment and deterrence.
