= Jewish Federation of San Diego County =

Philanthropic organization

- Founded: February 3, 1939; 87 years ago
- Tax ID no.: 95-1319015
- Legal status: 501(c)(3) nonprofit organization
- Location(s): 4950 Murphy Canyon Road San Diego, CA 92123
- Coordinates: 32.8285657°N 117.1200579°W
- Board Chair: Jack Maizel
- President and Chief Executive Officer: Heidi Gantwerk
- Affiliations: UJF Holdings Corp
- Revenue: $6,038,512 (2020)
- Expenses: $6,263,510 (2020)
- Endowment: $2,431,997
- Employees: 24 (2020)
- Volunteers: 300 (2020)
- Website: jewishinsandiego.org

The Jewish Federation of San Diego County (officially United Jewish Federation of San Diego) is a 501(c)(3) nonprofit organization whose primary function is to broker fundraising and volunteer work in support of Jewish causes within the San Diego Jewish community. It also works in partnership with various affiliated organizations, who share a similar mission in supporting Jewish causes nationally and internationally, including the Jewish Federations of North America. The organization was incorporated on February 3, 1939.

In addition to brokering funds, the Jewish Federation of San Diego County facilitates access to social services; local synagogues, day schools, and camps; and other charitable and advocacy groups within the Jewish community. Its in-house programs provide chaplaincy services, grants for trips to Israel, camp scholarships, activities and opportunities for young adults, emergency disaster relief, refugee aid, and public events.

== History ==
The Jewish Federation of San Diego County was founded in 1936. Its mission is "to build a vibrant, caring, connected, and enduring Jewish community."

It currently employs approximately 24 full-time staff members who are supported by a corps of volunteers and a board of trustees, currently led by Board Chair Jack Maizel and President and CEO Heidi Gantwerk. According to its most recently published financial statement, the organization raised over $5 million in fiscal year 2020-2021

In 1999, the Jewish Federation of San Diego County adopted Sha’ar HaNegev as its partner community in Israel. This relationship resulted in the building of the Sha'ar HaNegev Educational Village Arts Center, as part of a fortified educational campus, in 2012. As of 2022, the Jewish Federation of San Diego County has provided over $13 million in funding to the region.

== Programs ==
- Jewish Chaplaincy Services
- Jewish Community Relations Council
- Community Planning and Innovation
- Overnight Camp for Kids
- Young Adult Division

== Partners ==
- American Jewish Joint Distribution Committee
- Chesed Home, Hope Village San Diego
- Foundation for Jewish Camp
- Hillel of San Diego
- Jewish Family Service
- Jewish Agency for Israel
- Ken Jewish Community
- Lawrence Family Jewish Community Center
- Moishe House
- Seacrest Village Retirement Communities
- World ORT
- Sha'ar HaNegev Partnership Community
