= Gevim =

Kibbutz in southern Israel

Gevim: גבים (Hebrew); جيفيم (Arabic)
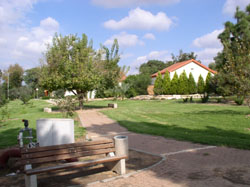

- Location within Ashkelon region of Israel
- Coordinates: 31°30′27″N 34°35′55″E
- Country: Israel
- District: Southern
- Subdistrict: Ashkelon
- Council: Sha'ar HaNegev
- Affiliation: Kibbutz Movement
- Founded: 1947
- Founder: Palmach members
- Population (2024): 704

Gevim (Hebrew: גֵּבִים, lit. Cisterns) is a kibbutz in southern Israel. Located in the northwestern Negev desert near Sderot, it falls under the jurisdiction of Sha'ar HaNegev Regional Council. In 2024 it had a population of 704.

== History ==
The kibbutz was established in 1947 under the name Sde Akiva. The founding members were from the Palmach and had previously been members of HaNoar HaOved VeHaLomed. It served as a headquarters for the Israel Defense Forces during the 1948 Arab-Israeli War, and was later renamed Gevim.

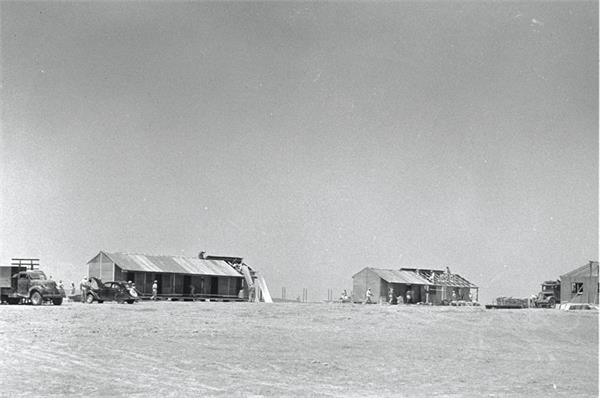
Gevim. 28 August 1947

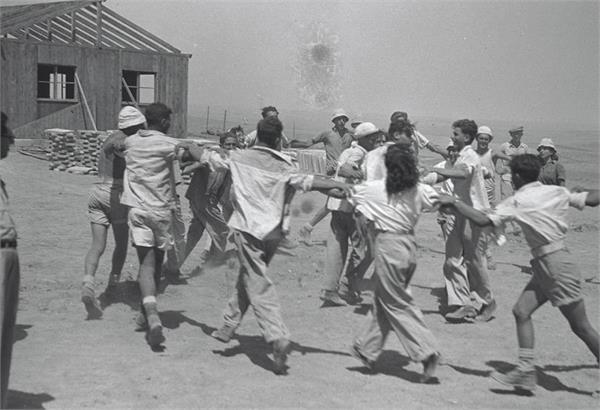
Sde Akiva Aliyah 28 August 1947

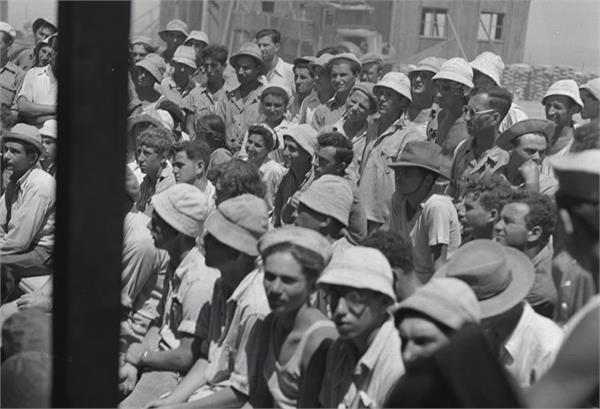
Sde Akiva founders 1947

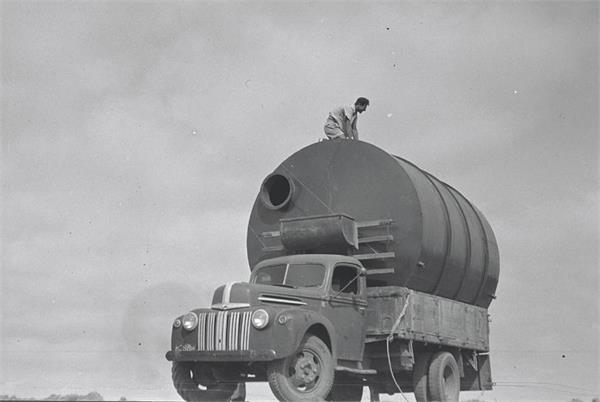
Sde Akiva water tank August 1947

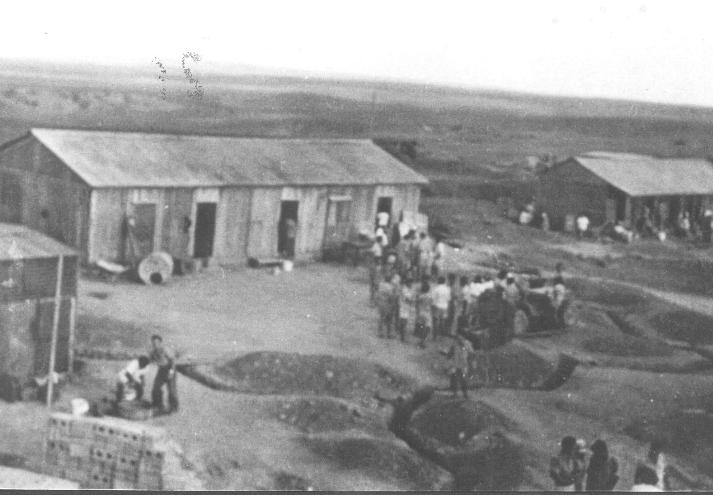
Kibbutz Gevim. 1948

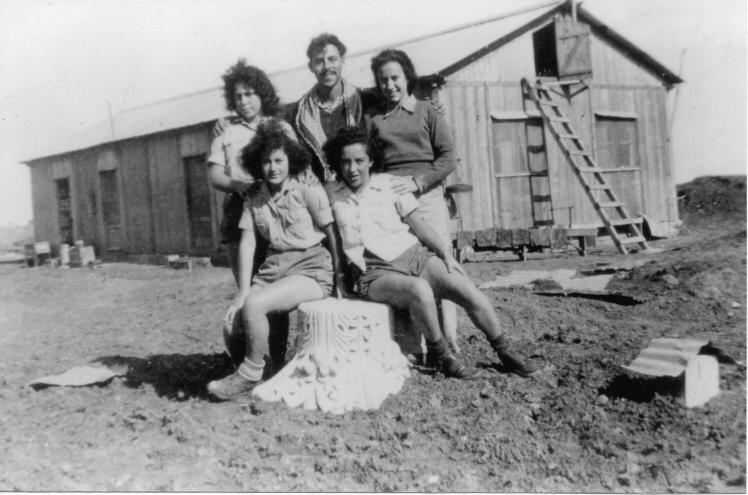
Members of Yiftach Brigade at Gevim. 1948

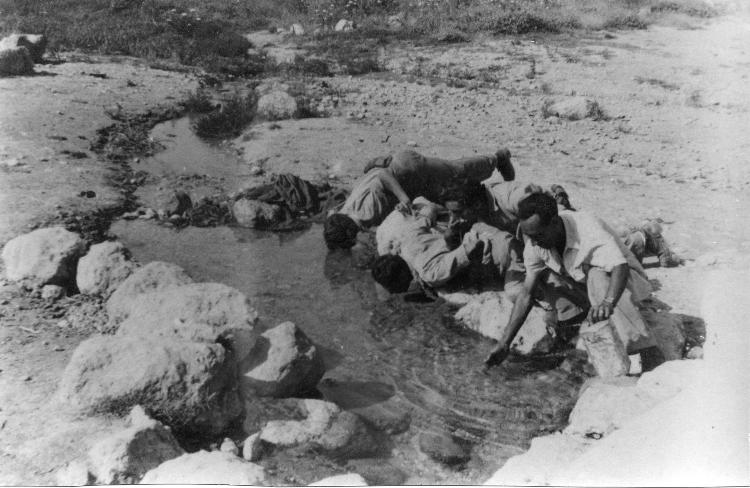
Water supply, Gevim 1948

During the 2000s, the kibbutz suffered from the repeating Qassam rocket attacks, with damage to buildings and minor injuries to residents. Based on an interview with the community manager of the kibbutz, the Goldstone Report on the Gaza conflict stated that sixty percent of the kibbutz children received psychological counselling.

At 7:22 on the morning of 7th October 2023, a squad of Islamist nationalist terrorists, that had broken through the barriers surrounding the Gaza Strip enclave, arrived at the fuel station opposite the kibbutz. Three minutes later, the squad approached the gate of the kibbutz. Shortly afterwards, armed kibbutz residents and IDF reservists engage in a firefight with the militia from Gaza. The two opposing military forces both sustain casualties, and some are killed. The battle ends as abruptly as it started. The next day, kibbutzniks of Gevim are ordered to evacuate their homes.

== Economy ==
In addition to agriculture, the kibbutz has a plastics factory. Poleg Plastic Industries operates two plants, one on the kibbutz and the other in Leipzig, Germany. The company is jointly owned by Kibbutz Gevim and Poli-Film Group, a private German company.

The kibbutz is located near Sha'ar HaNegev school and Sapir Academic College.
