= Al-Muharraqa =

al-Muharraqa المحرّقة al-Muharrqah
- Etymology: Kh. Muntaret el Baghl: "the ruin of the watch tower of the mule"
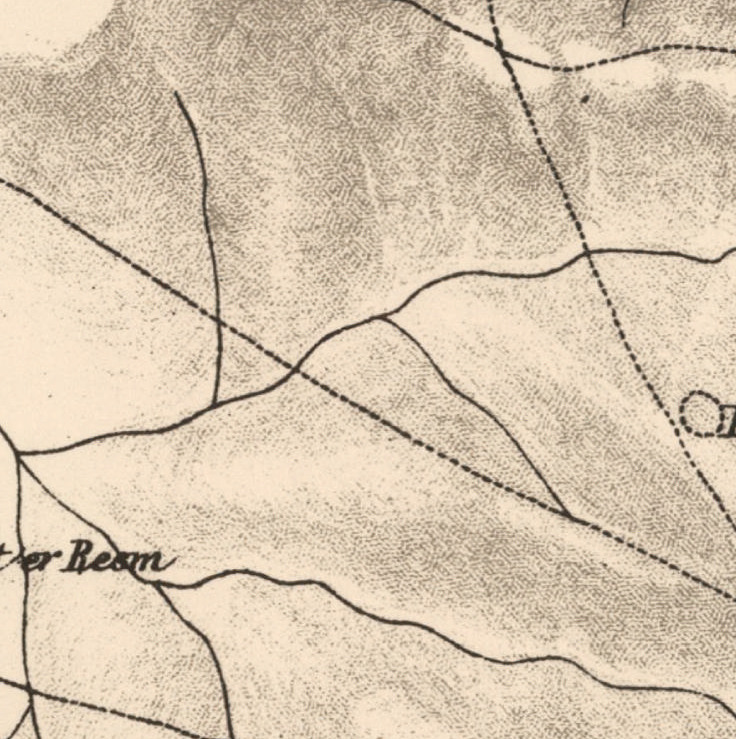
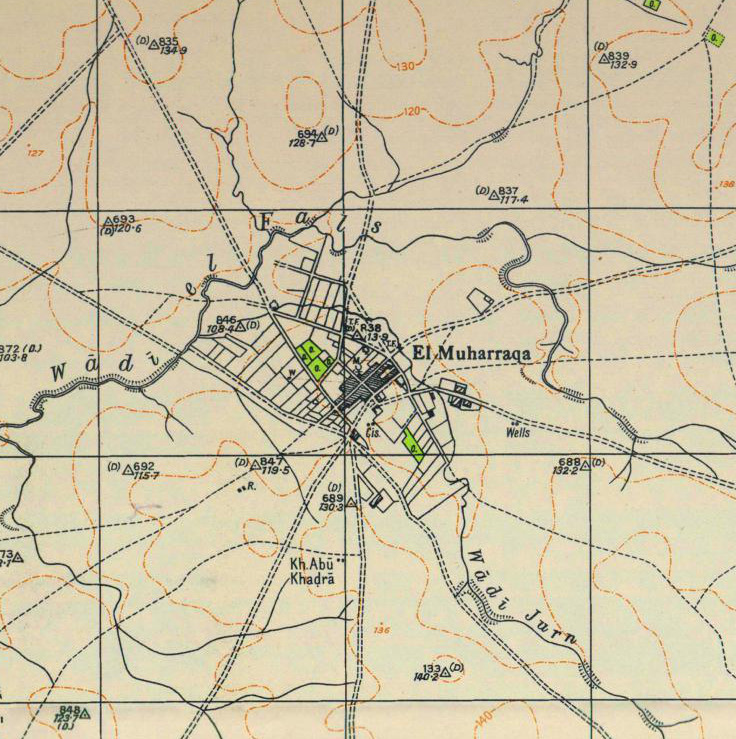
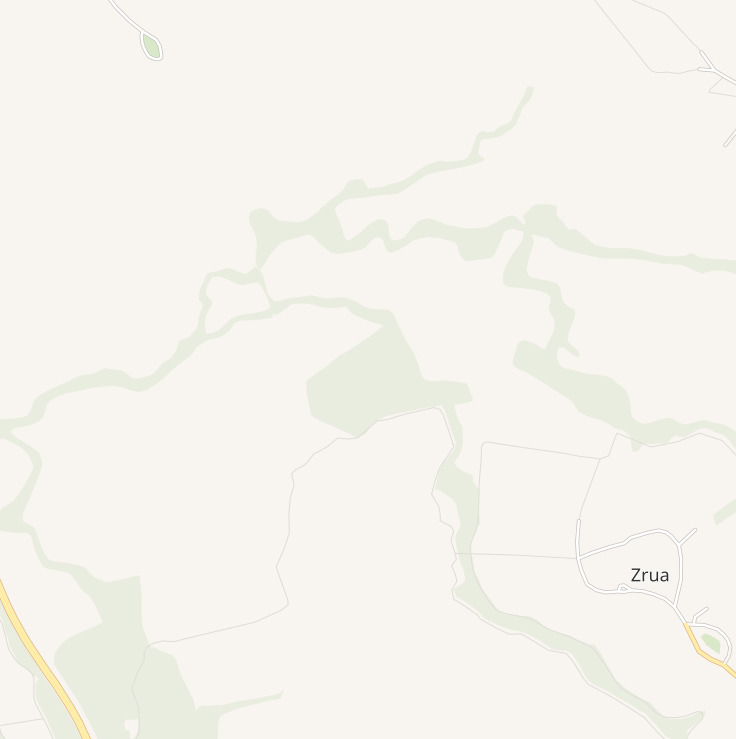
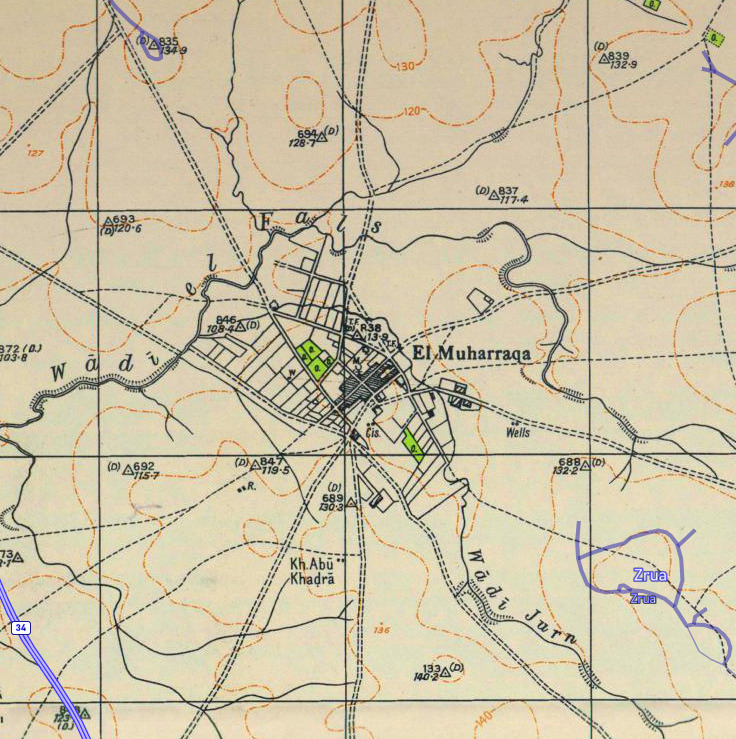
- 1870s map 1940s map modern map 1940s with modern overlay map A series of historical maps of the area around Al-Muharraqa (click the buttons)

- Location within Mandatory Palestine
- Coordinates: 31°28′01″N 34°36′41″E
- Palestine grid: 113/097
- Geopolitical entity: Mandatory Palestine
- Subdistrict: Gaza
- Date of depopulation: May 25, 1948

Area
  - Total: 4,855 dunams (4.855 km^{2}; 1.875 sq mi)

Population (1945)
  - Total: 580
- Cause(s) of depopulation: Military assault by Yishuv forces
- Current Localities: Yakhini

Al-Muharraqa (Arabic: المحرّقة) was a Palestinian Arab village in the Gaza Subdistrict, located 14.5 kilometers (9.0 mi) east of Gaza city. The village laid on rolling terrain on the southern coastal plain of Palestine, on a bend in the wadi. It had an elevation of 125 meters (410 ft) and a total land area of 4,855 dunams, most of which was public property, while its built-up area of 29 dunams was Arab-owned. Al-Muharraqa was depopulated during the 1948 Arab-Israeli War.

== History ==
Although not mentioned in Byzantine sources, al-Muharraqa was inhabited during this period, according to archaeological evidence. Byzantine ceramics, together with fragments of marble columns and a fragmentary mosaic pavement with geometric patterns have been found.

During the Mamluk period from the 13th to 15th centuries, the lands and surplus agricultural produce of al-Muharraqa were dedicated as a waqf for the maintenance of the Dome of the Rock in Jerusalem and the Great Mosque of Gaza.

=== Ottoman era ===
It was incorporated into the Ottoman Empire in 1517, and in a sijill (royal order) from 941/1535 all of the revenue from Al-Muharraqa went to Ribat al-Mansuri; a hospital in Jerusalem started by Al-Mansur Qalawun in 1282. In the 1596 tax records, it was under the administration of the nahiya of Gaza, part of the Sanjak of Gaza, with a population of 83 Muslim households, an estimated 457 persons. The villagers paid a fixed tax rate of 25% on a number of crops, including wheat, barley, beehives, and goats; a total of 26,600 akçe. All of the revenue went to a Waqf.

Al-Muharraqa was likely abandoned in either the 17th or 18th century, since it lacked mention by travellers, but was repopulated in the late 1870s.

In 1838 Edward Robinson noted it as el Muhurrakah, in the Gaza district, being "in ruins or deserted".

In 1883 the PEF's Survey of Western Palestine found of archaeological remains at the place, called Khürbet Muntaret el Baghl, "a few scattered stones and ruined rubble cisterns on a slope."

=== British mandate era ===
During the British Mandate period, the overall layout of the village was rectangular, and continued to expand in a rectangular pattern along the roads leading to the highway and the village of Kawfakha. In the 1922 census of Palestine, Muharraqa had a population of 204 Muslims, increasing in the 1931 census when Muharraqa had a population of 354 Muslims in 86 houses.

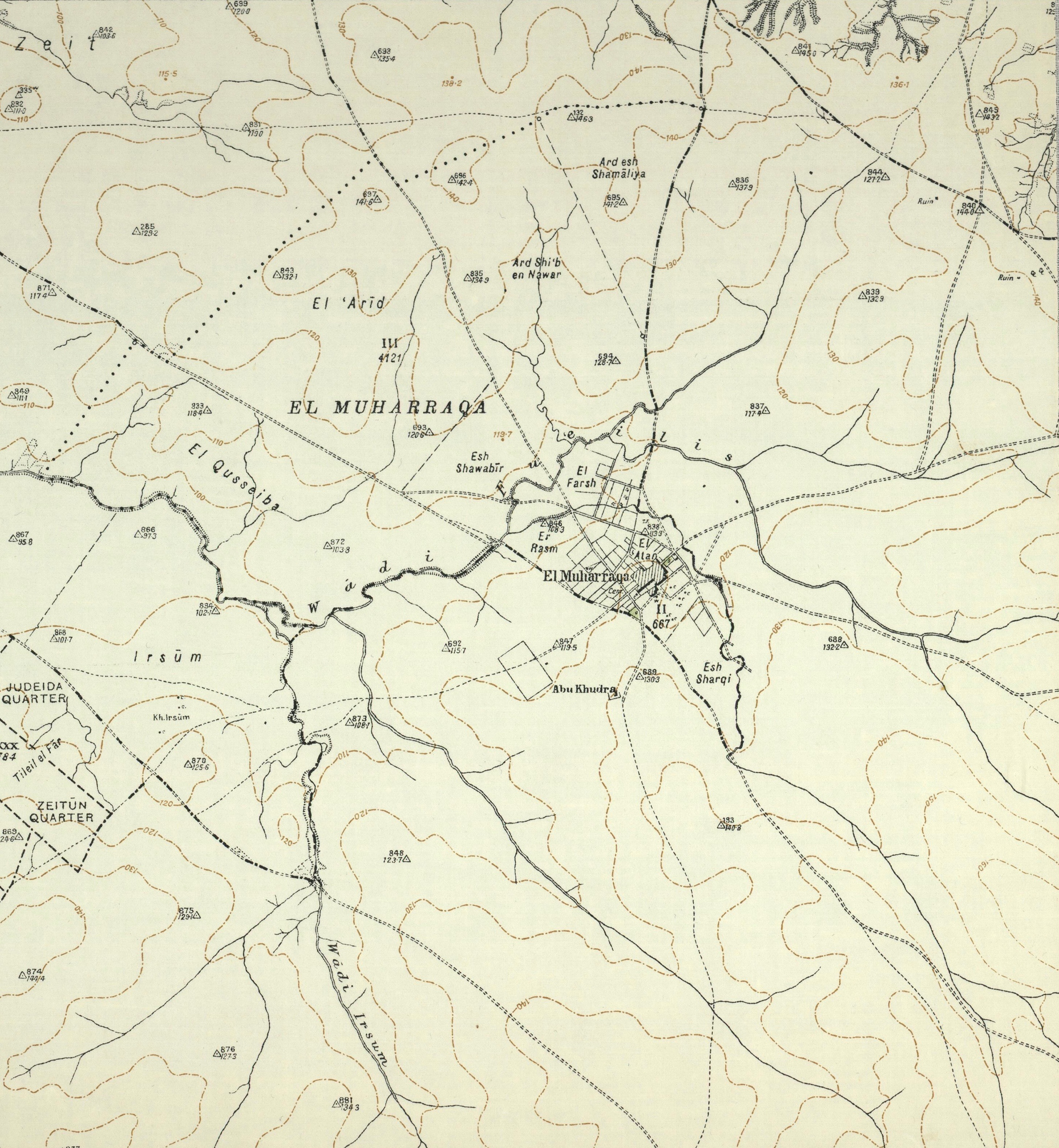
al-Muharraqa 1931 1:250,000

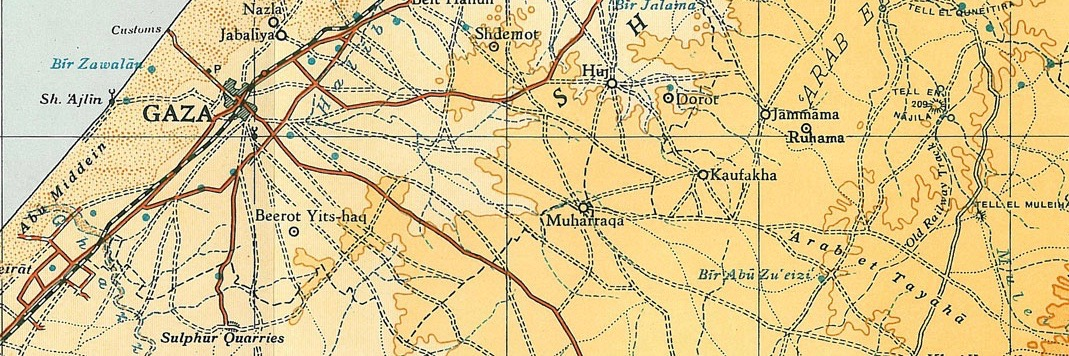
al-Muharraqa 1945 1:250,000

In the 1945 statistics Al-Muharraqa had a population of 580 Muslims, with a total of 4,855 dunams of land, according to an official land and population survey. Of this, 12 dunams were used for plantations and irrigable land, 4,622 for cereals, while 39 dunams were public built-up land.

The houses of the village were constructed of mud bricks, and there was a mosque and a school; the latter opened in 1945 with an enrollment of 60 students. The mosque, school, and a number of small shops constituted al-Muharraqa's nucleus. Water for household use was primarily obtained from a slightly salty 90 meters (300 ft) well, but was supplemented with rainwater which collected in some shallow domestic wells. Agriculture was the main source of income, especially the village's chief crop, barley. Figs, grapes, and almonds were also cultivated.

=== 1948 War, and aftermath ===
During the 1948 Arab-Israeli War, the village with Kawfakha was raided by the Palmach's Negev Brigade on May 27–28, and a correspondent for The New York Times reported it was officially captured on May 29. Israeli historian Benny Morris claims most of al-Muharraqa's inhabitants were driven out at that time, but it was not thoroughly destroyed and depopulated until August 16; Israeli forces were officially observing the second truce, however, Morris writes that they proceeded to mine and destroy the village for "military reasons".

Following the war the area was incorporated into the State of Israel and the moshav of Yakhini was built north of the village site in 1950 on village land. T'kuma, established in 1949, although the latter was built on lands belonging to the city of Gaza, but just 2 kilometers (1.2 mi) west of al-Muharraqa's village site.

Palestinian historian Walid Khalidi described the village remains in 1992:

The site is overgrown with thorny plants and short grasses and surrounded by eucalyptus trees. It is marked by piles of rubble from buildings, including the village diwan (a meeting and guest house). There are also the remnants of a mill and a well. The cemetery, overgrown with wild vegetation, still exists, in a dilapidated condition, and the fallen superstructure of one of the tombs is visible. The lands in the vicinity are cultivated by farmers.

== See also ==
- Depopulated Palestinian locations in Israel

== Bibliography ==
- Barron, J.B., ed. (1923). Palestine: Report and General Abstracts of the Census of 1922. Government of Palestine.
- Burgoyne, Michael Hamilton (1987). Mamluk Jerusalem. British School of Archaeology in Jerusalem by the World of Islam Festival Trust. ISBN 090503533X.
- Conder, C.R.; Kitchener, H.H. (1883). The Survey of Western Palestine: Memoirs of the Topography, Orography, Hydrography, and Archaeology. Vol. 3. London: Committee of the Palestine Exploration Fund.
- Dauphin, C. (1998). La Palestine byzantine, Peuplement et Populations. BAR International Series 726 (in French). Vol. III : Catalogue. Oxford: Archeopress. ISBN 0-860549-05-4.
- Government of Palestine, Department of Statistics (1945). Village Statistics, April, 1945.
- Hadawi, S. (1970). Village Statistics of 1945: A Classification of Land and Area ownership in Palestine. Palestine Liberation Organization Research Center. Archived from the original on 2018-12-08.
- Hütteroth, W.-D.; Abdulfattah, K. (1977). Historical Geography of Palestine, Transjordan and Southern Syria in the Late 16th Century. Erlanger Geographische Arbeiten, Sonderband 5. Erlangen, Germany: Vorstand der Fränkischen Geographischen Gesellschaft. ISBN 3-920405-41-2.
- Khalidi, W. (1992). All That Remains: The Palestinian Villages Occupied and Depopulated by Israel in 1948. Washington D.C.: Institute for Palestine Studies. ISBN 0-88728-224-5.
- Mills, E., ed. (1932). Census of Palestine 1931. Population of Villages, Towns and Administrative Areas. Jerusalem: Government of Palestine.
- Morris, B. (2004). The Birth of the Palestinian Refugee Problem Revisited. Cambridge University Press. ISBN 978-0-521-00967-6.
- Palmer, E.H. (1881). The Survey of Western Palestine: Arabic and English Name Lists Collected During the Survey by Lieutenants Conder and Kitchener, R. E. Transliterated and Explained by E.H. Palmer. Committee of the Palestine Exploration Fund.
- Robinson, E.; Smith, E. (1841). Biblical Researches in Palestine, Mount Sinai and Arabia Petraea: A Journal of Travels in the year 1838. Vol. 3. Boston: Crocker & Brewster.
