= Karni border crossing attack =

Palestinian terror attack on Israelis, 13 January 2005

- Part of the Second Intifada militancy campaign
- The attack site
- Native name: הפיגוע במחסום קרני (2005)
- Location: 31°28′31″N 34°28′41″E; Karni Crossing, Southern District, Israel
- Date: 13 January 2005; 21 years ago c. 22:45 pm (UTC+2)
- Attack type: Mass shooting
- Weapons: 90 kilograms (200 lb) explosive device, hand grenades, AK-47 rifles
- Deaths: 6 Israeli civilians (+3 attackers)
- Injuries: 5 Israeli civilians
- Perpetrators: Hamas, al-Aqsa Martyrs' Brigades and the Popular Resistance Committees claimed joint responsibility

The Karni border crossing attack was a Palestinian suicide bombing on 13 January 2005, at the pedestrian/cargo terminal Karni Crossing located on the Israeli Gaza Strip barrier. Six Israeli civilians were killed in the attack and five Israelis were injured in the attack.

Hamas, the Al Aqsa Martyrs Brigades and the Popular Resistance Committees claimed joint responsibility for the attack.

== Attack ==
On Thursday, January 13, 2005, at around 22:45 pm, a squad of three Palestinians militants armed with AK-47s and hand grenades, parked a truck loaded with a 200-pound explosive device, on the Palestinian side of the fence near an iron door that separates the Israeli and Palestinian sides at the Karni Crossing checkpoint. At 22:45 pm the squad detonated the explosives which created a hole through the iron door. Immediately afterwards the militants penetrated into the Israeli side of the Karni crossing through the hole in the iron door. The militant squad threw grenades and fired their assault weapons at the Israeli civilians on the site.

During the attack the Palestinian militant squad managed to kill six Israeli civilians (truck drivers and workers of the Port Authority) and in addition managed to injure five Israeli civilians.

The following exchange of fire between the Israeli soldiers stationed at the site and the Palestinian militants resulted in the killing of all three attackers.

== Perpetrators ==
Three Palestinian militant groups claimed joint responsibility for the attack, including Hamas, the Al Aqsa Martyrs Brigades and the Popular Resistance Committees.

After the attack, Abu Abir, a spokesman for the Popular Resistance Committees, stated to the press, "the attack is a continuation of the resistance."

== Official reactions ==
Israeli officials stated, "The prime minister has ordered suspension of all contacts with Palestinian Authority representatives and the closure of all Gaza terminals until real steps are taken against terrorist acts."

Newly elected President of the Palestinian National Authority Mahmoud Abbas condemned the attack.

== See also ==
- Erez Crossing bombing (January 14, 2004)
