= Karni crossing =

Former border crossing between Israel and the Gaza Strip, closed in 2011

Karni Crossing
- Gaza Strip border crossings
- Coordinates: 31°28′29″N 34°28′25″E
- Carries: Containers
- Crosses: Israel-Gaza Strip barrier
- Locale: Israel (Palestine) Gaza Strip
- Official name: Karni Crossing מעבר קרני معبر كارني
- Maintained by: Israel Airports Authority; Palestinian Authority

History
- Opened: 1994
- Closed: 2011

Statistics
- Daily traffic: 344 trucks (2007)

Location
- Interactive map of Karni Crossing

The Karni Crossing (Arabic: معبر كارني or معبر المنطار; Hebrew: מעבר קרני) was a cargo terminal on the Israel-Gaza Strip barrier located in the north-eastern end of the Gaza Strip was used for the export and import of goods to and from Gaza from 1994 to 2011. This was done as a 'back-to-back' transfer, meaning that Palestinian products meant for export were removed from a Palestinian truck and placed in an Israeli truck, and vice versa for incoming goods. The Karni Crossing was also used by the residents of Netzarim, since the Karni road was the only route to that isolated Israeli settlement on which Jewish travel was allowed after the 1994 implementation of the Oslo Accords. The crossing has been affected by the Israeli Blockade of the Gaza Strip.

In March 2011, Israel permanently closed the Karni Crossing. In December 2022, the last remaining structures of the crossing were demolished by the Israeli military in order to complete the Gaza–Israel barrier.

According to the management, the crossing was named after Joseph Karni, an Israeli who had set up a modern packing warehouse in the Gaza Strip near the present-day cargo terminal shortly after Israel captured the strip in 1967. The Palestinians called it Al-Montar, after the nearby Tell Ali Muntar.

== History ==
The Karni Crossing was opened in 1994 after the signing of the Oslo Accords to allow Palestinian merchants to export and import goods.

The Karni Crossing has been attacked several times by Palestinian militants since the beginning of the Second Intifada in 2000, in either mortar attacks or frontal infantry assaults, forcing temporary shut-downs for repairs and enhancement of security procedures. Both Palestinians and Israelis have been killed in these attacks. As a crossing between Israel and the Gaza Strip, the Karni Crossing has been used for hostile activities by armed forces from the Palestinian side. Militant Palestinian factions have used the Karni Crossing to smuggle suicide bombers and explosive belts into Israel. The deadliest suicide attack to come through Karni was the Port of Ashdod bombing in 2004.

In 2006, the Israeli authorities closed the crossing for over 100 days due to terror alerts and rocket fire. By then, the Karni Crossing was managed by the Israel Airports Authority, unlike the Erez Crossing, which is managed by the Israel Defense Forces. The Palestinian Centre for Human Rights released a statement calling for the crossing to be reopened, and saying that the closing of Karni was a violation of the Fourth Geneva Convention, which bans collective punishment.

Between September 2006 and June 2007, the crossing was open daily except for several brief closures due to Palestinian labour strikes. When Hamas took over the Gaza Strip in June 2007, Israel closed the terminal. The previous operators, who were affiliated with Fatah, had fled to the West Bank. Hamas offered to bring Fatah back to Karni or hire a Turkish company to operate the Palestinian side, but Israel has refused to deal with Hamas, the de facto authority in the Gaza Strip. In June 2007, the UNRWA coordinator commended the IDF on moving humanitarian shipments to the secondary Kerem Shalom and Sufa crossings, and hoped that Karni could be reopened as part of a longer-term solution.

At the end of March 2011, Israel permanently shut the Karni Crossing. All of its cargo operations were moved to Kerem Shalom border crossing, and pedestrian traffic was redirected to the Erez Crossing.

In December 2022, over a decade after the crossing was closed, the Israeli military demolished the last remaining structures at the site to enable the completion of the Gaza–Israel barrier.

== See also ==
- Israeli checkpoint
- Karni border crossing attack
- Rafah Border Crossing
