= Ort Itzhak Rabin =

Coordinates: 31°47′32.27″N 34°43′18″E

Ort Itzhak Rabin Gan Yavne
- אורט רבין גן יבנה
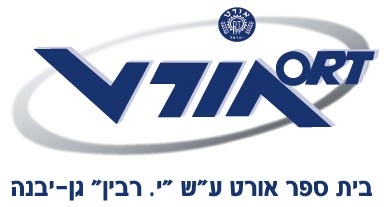
- Gan Yavne; Israel

Information
- Type: Public
- Established: 1995
- Grades: 7-12
- Website: c3.ort.org.il/ganyavne

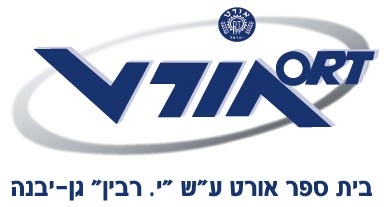
Ort Rabin Gan Yavne

Ort Itzhak Rabin Gan Yavne (Hebrew: אורט רבין גן יבנה, formerly referred to as Ort Gan Yavne, and as Kiryat Hinuch Rabin) is a pluralistic secular Jewish high school and junior high school in Gan Yavne, Israel.

== History ==
Ort Rabin was founded in 1995 as the first high school in the town of Gan Yavne. It was named after the late Prime Minister of Israel, Yitzhak Rabin. In addition to residents of Gan Yavne, it also accepts students from the nearby moshav of Bitzaron.

It offers Computer Programming (including Cyber security), Biology, Jewish thought, Arts, Geography, Theater & Journalism), Biotechnology and Humanities (Psychology). Besides Hebrew language classes, the school also offers Arabic which is studied as a foreign language alongside the mandatory English language (the school is one of the few that teaches 7 units level Bagrut in English).

The school has a robotics team that won prizes in the FIRST Robotics Competition.

Another ORT Israel high school in Gan Yavne is named "Ort Naomi Shemer" after the Israeli poet Naomi Shemer.

== Notable alumni ==
- Itay Turgeman (class of 2001) - Israeli actor and television host and an Ophir Award winner in 2002
- Iman Al-Abud (class of 2003) - Israeli-Bedouin reality contestant girl at Project Y second season in 2004
- Matan Ohayon (class of 2005) - Israeli Premier League footballer
- Inna Bakelman (class of 2007) - Israeli actress, model and reality contestant girl at Survivor Israel third season in 2009
- Lior Ohayon (class of 2008) - Israeli chef, fashion designer and reality contestant girl at MasterChef Israel eighth season in 2019 as well as at The Next Restaurant of Israel first season in 2022
- Dana Zalah (class of 2008) - Israeli singer and reality final stages girl at The Voice Israel second season in 2012
- Matan Jaboc (class of 2008) - Israel's Channel 12 News (formerly known as Channel 2 News) weather presenter
- Shoval Elgrabli (class of 2011) - Israeli model and a Miss Israel 2012 beauty pageant contestant
- Sahar Calizo (class of 2011) - Israeli YouTuber starring in HOT's docu-reality Project Calizo in 2018
- Bar Cohen (class of 2012) - Israeli singer and reality winner girl at Eyal Golan Kore Lach fourth season in 2016
- Roni Brachel (class of 2018) - Israeli model, singer and reality contestant girl at Rising Star (Israel) to the Eurovision fifth season; a Miss Israel 2020 beauty pageant contestant

== See also ==
- World ORT
