= Yakhini =

Moshav in southern Israel

Yakhini: יכיני (Hebrew)
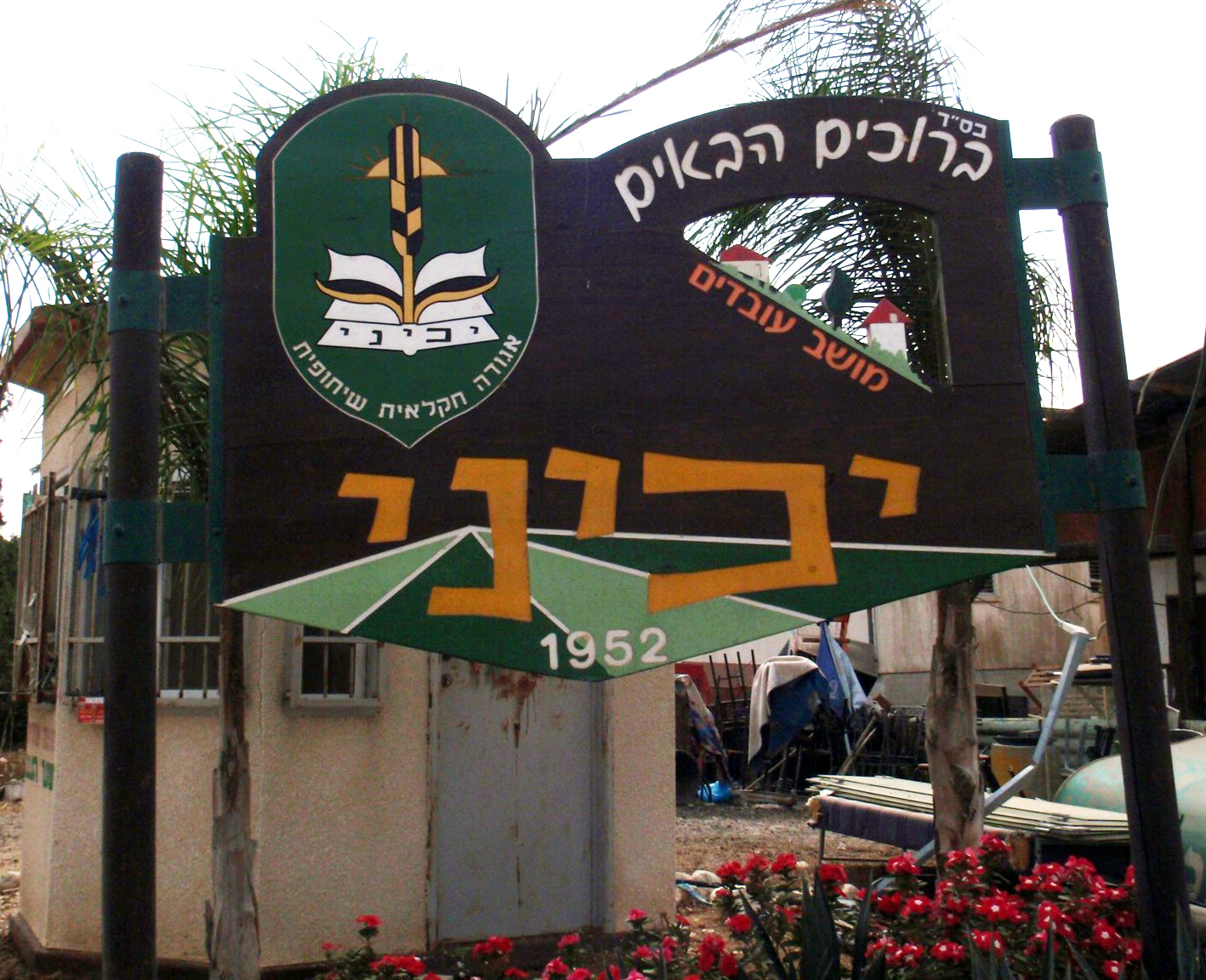

- Location within Northwest Negev region of Israel Location within Israel
- Coordinates: 31°29′00″N 34°35′58″E
- Country: Israel
- District: Southern
- Subdistrict: Ashkelon
- Council: Sha'ar HaNegev
- Affiliation: Moshavim Movement
- Founded: 1950
- Founder: Yemenite immigrants
- Population (2024): 814

Yakhini (Hebrew: יכיני) is a moshav in southern Israel. Located in the northern Negev desert near the city of Sderot, it falls under the jurisdiction of Sha'ar HaNegev Regional Council. In 2024 it had a population of 814.

== History ==
The moshav was founded in 1950 by Jewish immigrants from Yemen, who were brought to Israel during Operation Magic Carpet, when most Yemenite Jews arrived in the country. The moshav is named for one of the sons of Simeon, son of the patriarch Jacob, as it is located in territory that belonged to the Tribe of Simeon in biblical times (Numbers 26:12).

Yakhini was founded on the lands of Palestinian village of Al-Muharraqa that was depopulated in the 1948 war. Yakhini is a member of the purchasing agency of the Negev moshavim. The student village in Yakhini houses students from nearby Sapir College.

On 7 October 2023, it was the site of the Yakhini massacre.
