= Al-Nasser Salah al-Deen Brigades =

Palestinian armed organization

Al-Nasser Salah al-Deen Brigades ألوية الناصر صلاح الدين
- Emblem of the Al-Nasser Salah al-Deen Brigades
- Leader: Abu Sayyaf (since 2015)
- Spokesperson: Abu Ataya
- Founded: 2000
- Dates active: 2001–present
- Headquarters: Gaza City
- Active regions: Gaza Strip, West Bank, Israel
- Ideology: Palestinian nationalism Anti-Zionism
- Status: Active
- Size: 5,000
- Part of: Popular Resistance Committees; Palestinian Joint Operations Room

The al-Nasser Salah al-Deen Brigades (Arabic: ألوية الناصر صلاح الدين, lit. 'Brigades of Saladin the Victorious') is the military wing of the Popular Resistance Committees, a set of various Palestinian militant organizations that operate in the Gaza Strip.

== History ==
The Brigades participated in Operation Dispersive Illusion (Arabic: الوهم المتبدد), which resulted in the capture of the Israeli soldier Gilad Shalit. The group is also known for blowing up a Merkava tank, the main battle tank of the Israel Defense Forces.

The Brigades fought during the Gaza War from December 2008 to January 2009.

The group also took part in the 2014 Gaza War, and the death of one of its members in an Israeli raid was one of the reasons for the outbreak of the Gaza–Israel clashes in November 2018.

The Brigades have been fighting alongside the al-Qassam Brigades of Hamas and other allied Palestinian factions in the ongoing Gaza war (2023–present).

== See also ==
- List of military units named after people
