= Gan Yavne =

Town in central Israel

Gan Yavne גן יבנה
- Local council

Hebrew transcription(s)
  - ISO 259: Gann Yabne
  - Translit.: Gan Yavneh
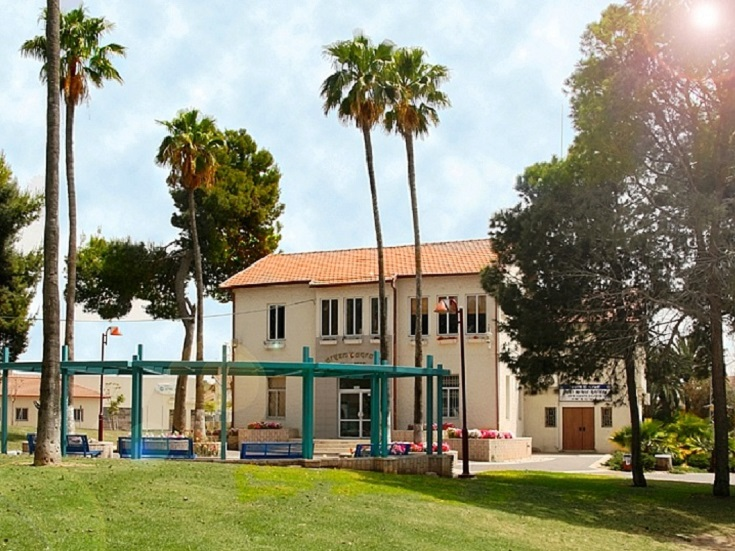
- Gan Yavne town hall

- Location within Ashkelon region of Israel
- Coordinates: 31°46′56″N 34°42′19″E
- Country: Israel
- District: Central
- Subdistrict: Rehovot
- Natural Region: Rehovot
- Founded: 1931

Government
  - Head of Municipality: Aharon Dror (since 2003)

Area
  - Total: 10,600 dunams (10.6 km^{2}; 4.1 sq mi)

Population (2024)
  - Total: 25,144
  - Density: 2,370/km^{2} (6,140/sq mi)
- Name meaning: Yavne Garden

Gan Yavne (Hebrew: גן יבנה) is a town in central Israel, located adjacent to the city of Ashdod. Gan Yavne was founded in 1931 and achieved local council status in 1950.

It lies east of the Tel Aviv–Ashkelon highway, and is bordered to the west by Ashdod, to the north by Gederot Regional Council, and to the east and south by Be'er Tuvia Regional Council. In 2024 it had a population of 25,144. The population in Gan Yavne is nearly entirely Jewish.

== History ==
Gan Yavne was established in 1931 by the "Achuza Aleph" Company founded by several Jewish families from Russia and Poland, who had immigrated to the United States. The inspiration for its name "Gan Yavne", comes from its proximity to the historical city of Yavne. In 1930 land was purchased and plans were drawn up to plant 400 dunams of orange groves. After negotiations with the Mandatory government between 1936 and 1938, a road was paved to Gan Yavne. The village was designed as a garden city.

As of 2017, the town has over 23,000 residents, who are almost exclusively Jewish.

Gan Yavne was the site of the Gan Yavne stabbing attack on 31 March 2024 in which 1 person was killed.

== Urban development ==
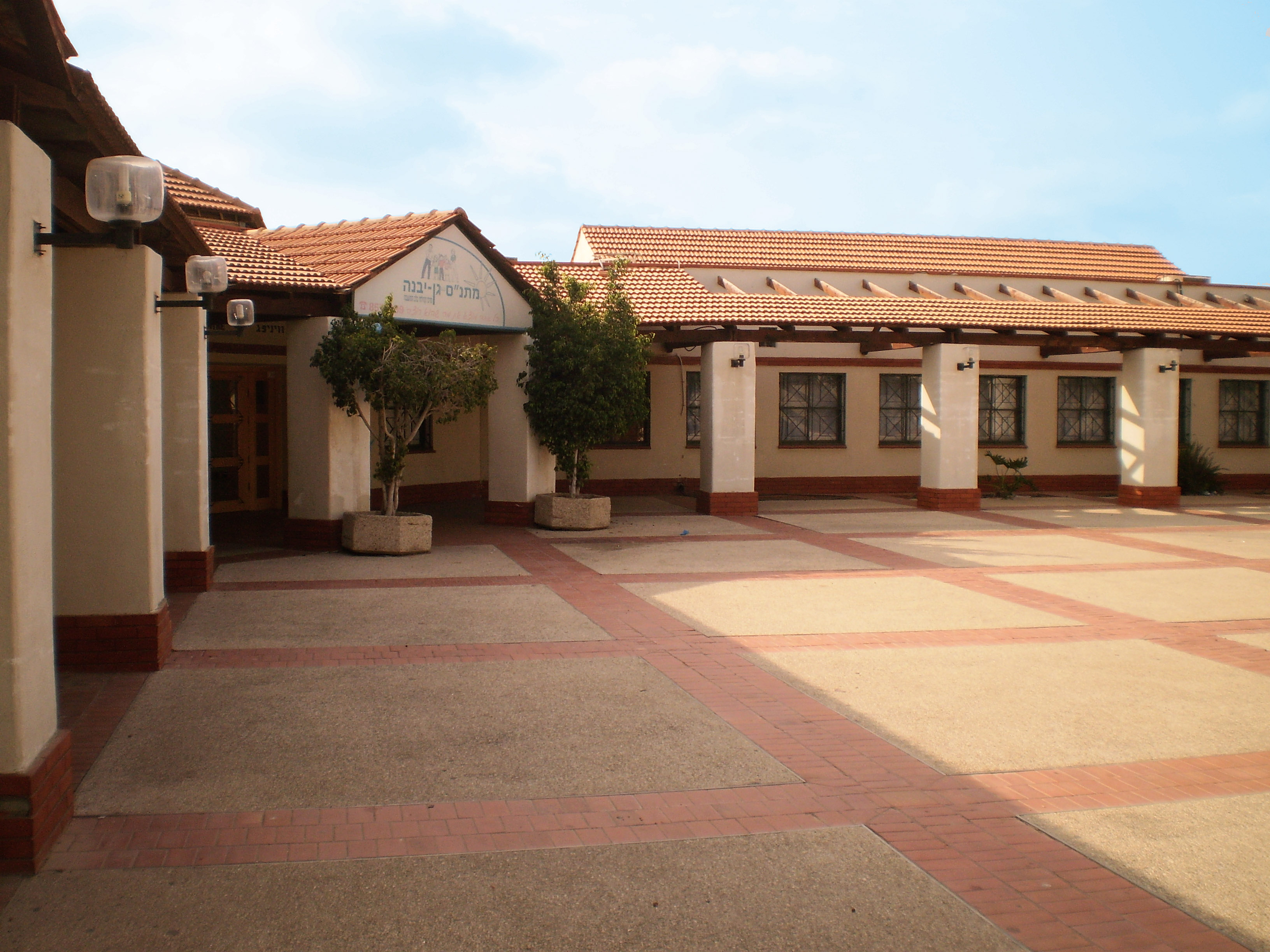
Gan Yavne community center

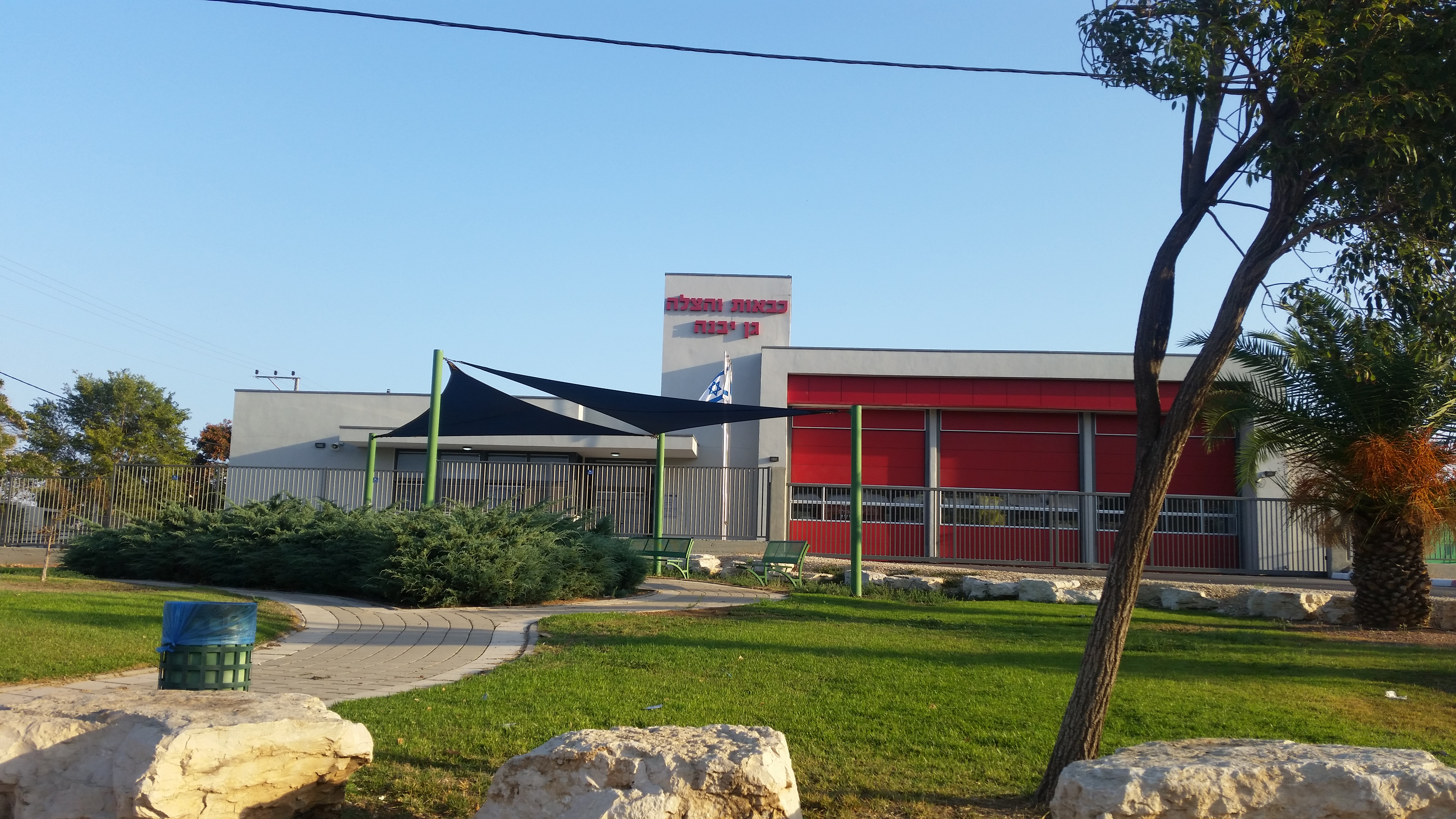
Gan Yavne fire and rescue station

In the 1990s and 2000s Gan Yavne more than doubled its population, becoming a commuter town. The development of Highway 4, which is a freeway between Tel Aviv and Gan Yavne junction, and also the introduction of frequent rail service to the nearby Ashdod railway station, allows commuters to travel to Tel Aviv in 30–45 minutes.

== Education and culture ==
Gan Yavne has 38 kindergartens, 5 state elementary schools (Ben-Gurion, Maccabim, Ilan Ramon, Ehud Manor, and Nofey Moledet), a state religious elementary school (Sinai), and 2 junior highs/high schools (Ort Itzhak Rabin and Ort Naomi Shemer). Beit Apple youth village is also located in Gan Yavne.

The town has a community center and library, a community center for the elderly, gyms and sports fields, and a country club.

It also has had a number of youth movements (Hebrew Scouts, HaNoar HaOved VeHaLomed, Bnei Akiva, Rotary Interact, HaNoar HaLeumi, and several others).

== Demographics ==
| Year | Population |
|---|---|
| 1972 | 2,800 |
| 1983 | 2,800 |
| 1995 | 6,600 |
| 2008 | 17,300 |
| 2022 | 23,688 |
| 2024 | 25,144 |

== Voting patterns ==
In the 2022 election, 57 percent of voters in Gan Yavne voted for the parties of the right-wing coalition led by Benjamin Netanyahu, while 40 percent voted for the parties of the center-left coalition led by Yair Lapid.

In the 2026 election, 50 percent of voters in Gan Yavne voted for the parties of the right-wing coalition led by Benjamin Netanyahu, while 42 percent voted for the parties of the center-left coalition led by Gadi Eisenkot and 0.2 percent voted for the Arab parties. An additional 5.3 percent voted for the Reservists, and 2.3 percent voted for Amcha Yisrael. Voter turnout increased 22 percent from the 2022 election.

== Twin towns – sister cities ==
Gan Yavne is twinned with:

- Puteaux, France (since 1973)
- Winnipeg, Manitoba, Canada (since 1984)

== Notable residents ==
- Matan Ohayon (born 1986) - former Israeli Premier League footballer

== See also ==
- Ort Itzhak Rabin
