= Sha'ar HaNegev Regional Council =

Coordinates: 31°29′N 34°36′E

Sha'ar HaNegev Regional Council מועצה אזורית שער הנגב مجلس إقليمي شاعر النقب
- Regional council (from 1950)
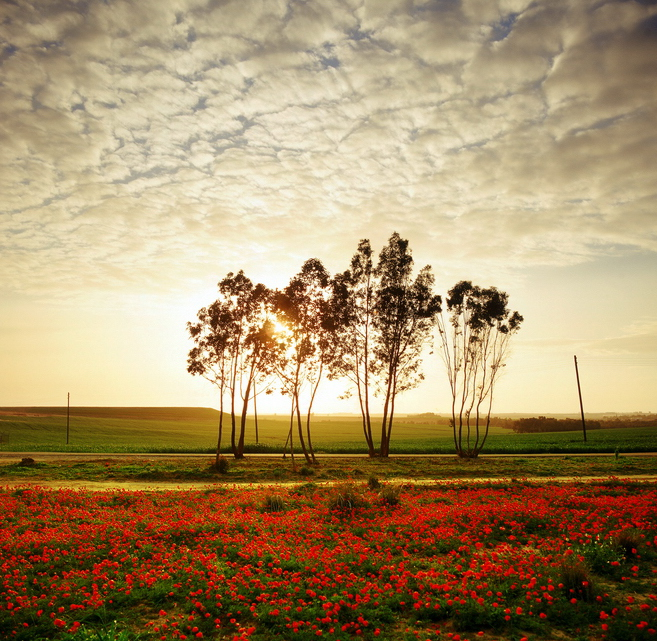
- View on Highway 25 in 1998

- Interactive map of Sha'ar HaNegev Regional Council
- Country: Israel
- District: Southern
- Subdistrict: Ashkelon
- Natural region: Ashkelon

Government
  - Head of Municipality: Yossi Keren (acting)

Area
  - Total: 180,780 dunams (180.78 km^{2}; 69.80 sq mi)

Population (2024)
  - Total: 9,806
  - Density: 54.24/km^{2} (140.5/sq mi)
- Website: www.sng.org.il

The Sha'ar HaNegev Regional Council (Hebrew: מועצה אזורית שער הנגב, Mo'atza Azorit Sha'ar HaNegev, lit. Gate of the Negev Regional Council), is a regional council in the north-western Negev, in Israel's Southern District. The Regional Council's territory lies midway between Beersheba and Ashkelon, bounded on the west by the Gaza Strip. The eastern border abuts Bnei Shimon. The city of Sderot forms an enclave within Sha'ar HaNegev.

The region's population is almost 10,000, and covers an area of over 45,000 acres (approx. 180 km^{2} or 70 sq. mi.). The average elevation is approximately 180 m (495 ft.) above sea level.

Sha'ar HaNegev Regional Council is in a sister city relationship with San Diego, California, in the United States of America, and has a close working relationship with the Jewish Federation of San Diego County.

== Settlements ==
There are 11 communities, including 10 kibbutzim and one moshav.

Kibbutzim

- Bror Hayil
- Dorot
- Erez
- Gevim
- Kfar Aza
- Mefalsim
- Nahal Oz
- Nir Am
- Or HaNer
- Ruhama

Moshav

- Yakhini

Educational institutions

- Ibim

Historical sites

- Shikmim

== Demographics ==
Historical population
Year	Pop.	±%
1972	3,700	—
1983	4,800	+29.7%
1995	4,300	−10.4%
2008	5,810	+35.1%
2022	8,917	+53.5%
2024	9,806	+10.0%

== Voting Patterns ==
In the 2022 election, 79 percent of voters in the regional council voted for the parties of the center-left coalition led by Yair Lapid, while 21 percent voted for the parties of the right-wing coalition led by Benjamin Netanyahu and 0.4 percent voted for the Arab parties.

In the 2026 election, 75 percent of voters in the regional council voted for the parties of the center-left coalition led by Gadi Eisenkot, while 18 percent voted for the parties of the right-wing coalition led by Benjamin Netanyahu and 0.4 percent voted for the Arab parties. An additional 4 percent voted for the Reservists, and 1.9 percent voted for Amcha Yisrael. Voter turnout increased 7 percent from the 2022 election.
