= Popular Resistance Committees =

Coalition of Palestinian groups

Popular Resistance Committees لجان المقاومة الشعبية
- Emblem of the Popular Resistance Committees
- Leaders: Jamal Abu Samhadana (2000–2006) 'Amir Qarmoot Abu As-Sa'id (2006–2008); Kamal al-Nirab (2008–2011); Zuhir al-Qaisi (2011–2012); Ayman al-Shashniya (2012–present)
- Dates active: 2000–present
- Split from: Fatah
- Group: Al-Nasser Salah al-Deen Brigades
- Active regions: Gaza Strip
- Ideology: Palestinian nationalism Anti-Zionism; Islamism; One-state solution

The Popular Resistance Committees (PRC; Arabic: لجان المقاومة الشعبية, Lijān al-Muqāwama al-Shaʿbiyya) is a coalition of a number of armed Palestinian groups opposed to what they regard as the conciliatory approach of the Palestinian Authority and Fatah towards Israel.

The PRC is especially active in the Gaza Strip, through its military wing, the Al-Nasser Salah al-Deen Brigades. The PRC has planned and executed a number of varied operations, but specializes in planting roadside bombs and vehicle explosive charges - directed against military and civilian convoys.

Formed in late 2000 by former Fatah and Tanzim member Jamal Abu Samhadana, the PRC is composed primarily of ex-Fatah fighters and Al-Aqsa Martyrs' Brigades members and is alleged by Israel to be inspired and financed by Hezbollah. The present leader of PRC is Ayman al-Shashniya.

The PRC was believed to be the third strongest faction active in the Gaza Strip, after Hamas and Islamic Jihad in 2012. It is currently fighting alongside Hamas and other allied Palestinian factions in the ongoing Gaza war (2023–present). It has been designated a terrorist organization by Israel and the United States.

== History ==
=== Founding ===
During the Second Intifada the PRC came together out of Fatah members in the Southern Gaza Strip. In April 2001 Yasser Arafat ordered the PRC to dissolve for its members to return to their previous positions within Fatah but the group refused. The PRC also attracted defectors from the PFLP

=== Later History ===
On 15 October 2003, explosives destroyed a US diplomatic convoy at Beit Hanoun, killing three security guards and severely wounding a diplomat. The PRC initially claimed responsibility for the attack, but later denied carrying out the attack, saying it was against Palestinian interests. The US demanded that the Palestinian National Authority find those responsible and bring them to justice. Palestinian officials said that because of lack of progress in the attack investigation, the US halted financial support for the PA and placed unofficial sanctions on its accounts. After heavy US pressure, the Palestinian Authority arrested several PRC members, accusing them of being responsible. The PRC confirmed the men were PRC members. The PA tried the four "suspects" in a Palestinian military court, but intelligence agencies dismissed the tribunal as a "mock trial" and said while the suspects were PRC activists, they were not those responsible for the attack. The men were released in March 2004.

The Jenin Martyr's Brigade was formed in March 2003 as a part of the PRC. Besides other activities, the JMB claimed responsibility for the March 2003 bombing of an Israeli bus in Haifa. The bus was blown to pieces when a suicide bomber, seated in the rear of the vehicle, detonated 10-15 kilograms of shrapnel-laced explosives that were attached to his body. 16 people died in the blast, and another 30-40 were injured. On 17 July 2004, the group kidnapped Palestinian Civil Police Forces Chief Ghazi al-Jabali at gunpoint in an ambush of his convoy which wounded two bodyguards. Al-Jabali was only released after Palestinian President Yasser Arafat agreed to PRC demands that he be fired.

The PRC are also involved in Rafah's smuggling tunnels which have been used to smuggle weapons, explosives, fugitives and civilian supplies etc.

The PRC claimed responsibility for the assassination of Moussa Arafat on 7 September 2005.

On 8 June 2006, PRC leader Jamal Abu Samhadana was killed by IDF forces, along with at least three other PRC members. As the man considered responsible for a number of attacks, including the bombing of a children's school bus near Kfar Darom in November 2000 and for the 2003 infiltration into an IDF outpost in Rafah that left several soldiers dead, he was considered one of the most wanted Palestinians on the IDF's hit-list.

On Sunday, 25 June 2006, the PRC, together with Hamas and Jaish al-Islam ("the Army of Islam"), launched a major attack via a tunnel near the Kerem Shalom outpost. Eight Palestinian fighters used a nearly one kilometre tunnel that they had dug over the past several months to cross under the border between Gaza and Israel. The surprise attack ended with two Israeli soldiers dead and four wounded and the capture of Corporal Gilad Shalit. Two of the Palestinian attackers were killed while the other six made it back to the Gaza Strip with Shalit. Shalit was released five years later in a prisoner exchange.

The same day of the tunnel attack, Eliyahu Asheri, an 18-year-old Israeli student, went missing near the West Bank. The PRC shortly claimed responsibility for kidnapping and murdering him. Spokesman for the group, Abu Abir, also announced that the PRC had formed special units in the West Bank whose sole purpose is to kidnap soldiers and settlers, in accordance with the continued Operation "Cavaliers' Wrath."

On 8 August 2007, the PRC announced that it would form a political party to run in future Palestinian elections. It vowed, however, to keep its armed wing intact. In February 2008 then PRC leader 'Amir Qarmoot Abu As-Sa'id was killed in an Israeli airstrike.

On 25 August 2007, militants from the PRC and Democratic Front for the Liberation of Palestine attempted to enter the Israeli border town of Netiv HaAsara from Gaza. The militants used a ladder to scale the Israel-Gaza border, and two militants were killed by the Israel Defense Forces.

On 18 August 2011, Israel accused the PRC of committing the 2011 southern Israel attacks in which 8 Israelis were killed in firing and suicide bombing on two buses and a car near the Israeli-Egyptian border north to Eilat. On the evening of the same day, the Israeli Air Force, working with Shin Bet, bombed the homes of PRC members in Rafah. Among the dead, as identified by the group, were their commander, Kamal al-Nairab and Immad Hammad, chief of its military wing Al-Nasser Salah al-Deen Brigades, and at least two more top members of the group and another member. The PRC responded to the raids in saying that it vows "double" revenge for the attack.

On 9 March 2012, an Israeli airstrike in Gaza killed PRC secretary-general Zuhir al-Qaisi (Zuhair al-Qaissi) as well as Mahmoud Hanani.

In July 2013, Hamas cracked down on PRC activities in Gaza, arresting a number of PRC members.

In October 2023, during the ongoing Gaza war, Israel claimed to have killed the head of PRC's armed wing, Rafat Abu Hilal, in an airstrike in Rafah.

== Ideology ==
The Popular Resistance Committees support the creation of a Palestinian state encompassing all of modern day Israel and Palestine, the group has an Islamist ideology.

== Activities ==
The PRC have been involved in a number of bombing attacks against Israel targeting both military and civilian targets, including:

- The 8 October 2000 shooting attack on a bus carrying airport workers near the Rafah terminal, wounding eight civilians, and a similar attack on a car on the road from Kerem Shalom to the Rafah terminal, killing the woman driver.
- The 20 November 2000: A mortar shell attack against scholar bus children as it passed near Kfar Darom, killing two adult workers, wounding ten young children more (one of them lose his leg).
- The 28 April 2001 mortar attacks on the Netzer Hazani agricultural Israeli settlement in the Gaza Strip (wounding five, one seriously), and similar attacks on Kfar Darom on 29 April and on Atzmona on 7 May of the same year.
- The February 14, 2002 killing of three Israeli soldiers using large explosive charges designed for tanks, and similar killings of three more soldiers on March 14 and one more on September 5 of that same year.
- The May 2, 2004 killing of the unarmed and pregnant Tali Hatuel, and her four daughters aged 2 to 11, on Kissufim road. The PRC and Islamic Jihad jointly claimed responsibility, also claiming that the attack was in retaliation for earlier Israel Defense Forces (IDF) killings of Sheikh Ahmed Yassin and Abdel Aziz al-Rantissi.
- The January 13, 2005 killing of six Israeli civilians at the Karni Passage near Gaza, carried out together with Hamas and the al-Aqsa Martyrs' Brigades.
- On February 4, 2008, the Israeli Air Force assassinated the PRC's top military leader, Amer Qarmut (Abu Said) in response to a joint suicide bombing by the al-Aqsa Martyrs Brigades and the Popular Front for the Liberation of Palestine in Dimona, which killed one Israeli.
- On March 6, 2008, the PRC detonated a roadside charge near the Kissufim crossing, killing an Israeli officer and wounding three others, one critically.
- Gaza war (2023–present): The PRC participated in the October 7 attacks, which started the war, and has since fought alongside Hamas and other allied Palestinian factions against the IDF throughout the Gaza Strip.

== Hezbollah connection ==
According to Israel, the relation between the PRC and Hezbollah is more than coincidental. Israel alleges the organization enjoys financing and technical support from Hezbollah since its founding, and is a sort of proxy of Hezbollah's influence in the Gaza Strip. The organization outwardly projects this relation through its mimicry of the Hezbollah flag which also bears a fist clenching a Kalashnikov rifle and stylized writing.

However, in recent times since the start of the Syrian Civil War the group has distanced itself from Hezbollah and Iran even condemning Iran's involvement and Hezbollah's involvement in the war. The group released a video in June 2016 called "One Nation" where they showed signs labelled with various cities including Aleppo, Gaza, Jerusalem, Fallujah, and Sanaa covered in blood referencing confrontations involving Iranian backed militias such as the Battle of Aleppo and Battle of Fallujah (2016), while a speaker from the group discussed the group's solidarity with Sunnis affected by the conflicts in Iraq, Syria, and Yemen.
