= 2008 Gaza Strip bombings =

2008 Gaza Strip bombings may refer to:

- Operation Hot Winter, a military campaign between February 28, 2008, and March 3, 2008
- Operation Cast Lead, a military campaign that began on December 27, 2008, as part of the 2008–2009 Israel–Gaza conflict
