= Palestinian rocket attacks on Israel =

Since 2001, Palestinian militants have launched tens of thousands of rocket and mortar attacks on Israel from the Gaza Strip as part of the continuing Israeli–Palestinian conflict. The attacks, widely condemned for targeting civilians, have been described as terrorism by the United Nations, the European Union, and Israeli officials, and are defined as war crimes by human rights groups Amnesty International and Human Rights Watch. The international community considers indiscriminate attacks on civilian targets to be illegal under international law. Palestinian militants say rocket attacks are a response to Israel's blockade of Gaza, but the Palestinian Authority has condemned them and says rocket attacks undermine peace.

From 2004 to 2014, these attacks have killed 27 Israeli civilians, 5 foreign nationals, 5 IDF soldiers, and at least 11 Palestinians and injured more than 1,900 people. Medical studies in Sderot, the Israeli city closest to the Gaza Strip, have documented a post-traumatic stress disorder incidence among young children of almost 50%, as well as high rates of depression and miscarriage. A public opinion poll conducted in March 2013 found that a majority of Palestinians do not support firing rockets at Israel from the Gaza Strip, with only 38% favoring their use. Another poll conducted in September 2014 found that 80% of Palestinians support firing rockets against Israel, if it does not allow unfettered access to Gaza. The rocket attacks have caused flight cancellations at Ben Gurion Airport.

The weapons, often generically referred to as Qassams, were initially crude and short-range, mainly affecting Sderot and other communities bordering the Gaza Strip. In 2006, more sophisticated rockets began to be deployed, reaching the larger coastal city of Ashkelon, and by early 2009 major cities Ashdod and Beersheba had been hit by Katyusha, WS-1B and Grad rockets. In 2012, Jerusalem and Israel's commercial center Tel Aviv were targeted with locally made "M-75" and Iranian Fajr-5 rockets, respectively, and in July 2014, the northern city of Haifa was targeted for the first time. Several projectiles have contained white phosphorus. According to a Hamas militant, these shells are recycled from unexploded munitions used by Israel in bombing Gaza.

Attacks have been carried out by all Palestinian armed groups, and, prior to the 2008–2009 Gaza War, were consistently supported by most Palestinians, although the stated goals have been mixed.

Israeli defenses constructed specifically to deal with the weapons include fortifications for schools and bus stops as well as an alarm system named Red Color. Iron Dome, a system to intercept short-range rockets, was developed by Israel and first deployed in the spring of 2011 to protect Beersheba and Ashkelon, but officials and experts warned that it would not be completely effective. Shortly thereafter, it intercepted a Palestinian Grad rocket for the first time.

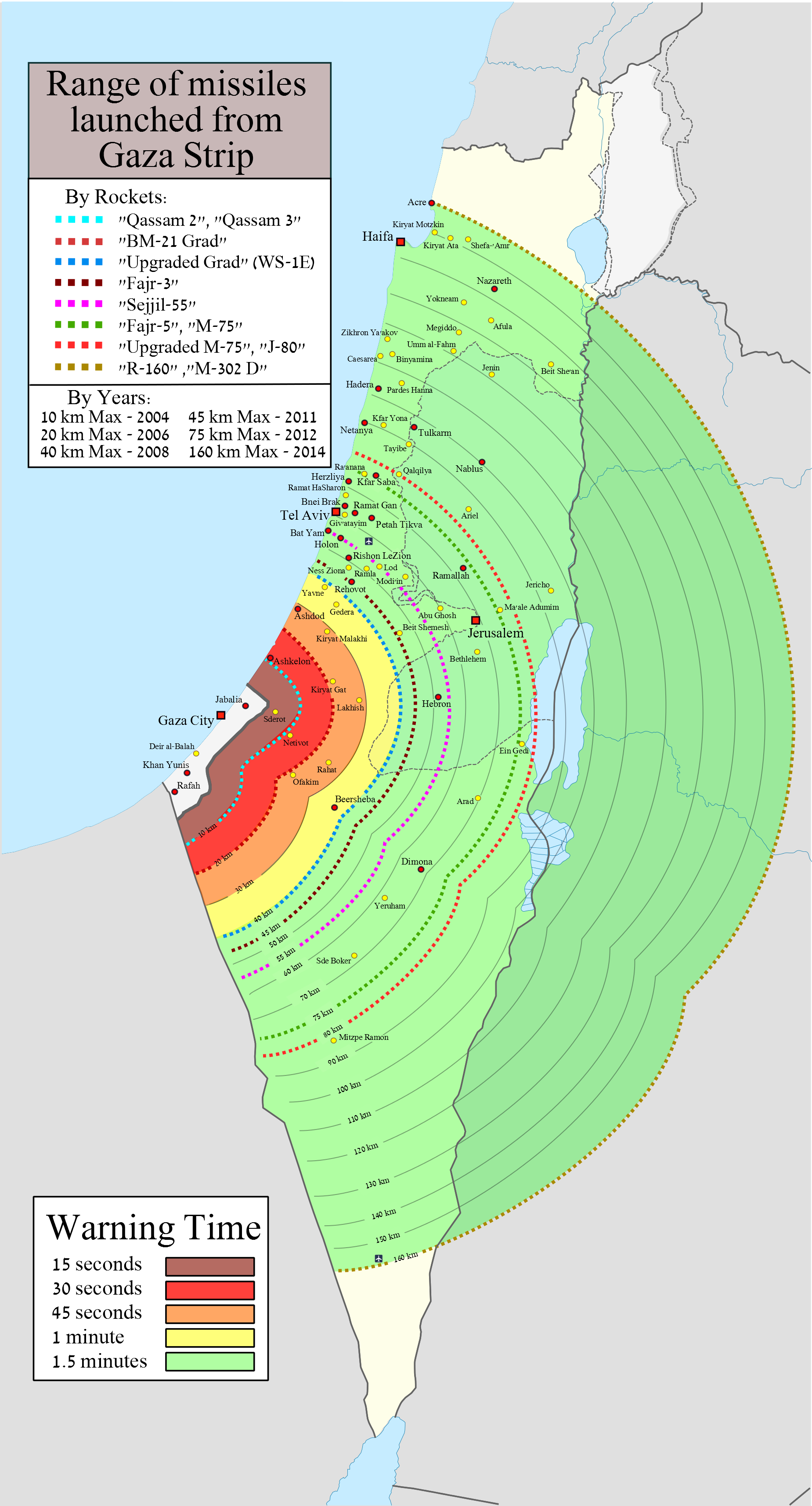
Range of missiles launched from Gaza Strip (10-160 km).

In the cycle of violence, rocket attacks alternate with Israeli military actions. From the outbreak of the Second Intifada (30 September 2000) through March 2013, 8,749 rockets and 5,047 mortar shells were fired on Israel, while Israel has conducted several military operations in the Gaza Strip, among them Operation Rainbow (2004), Operation Days of Penitence (2004), Operation Summer Rains (2006), Operation Autumn Clouds (2006), Operation Hot Winter (2008), Operation Cast Lead (2009), Operation Pillar of Defense (2012), Operation Protective Edge (2014), Operation Guardian of the Walls (2021) and Operation Swords of Iron (2023).

== Overview ==
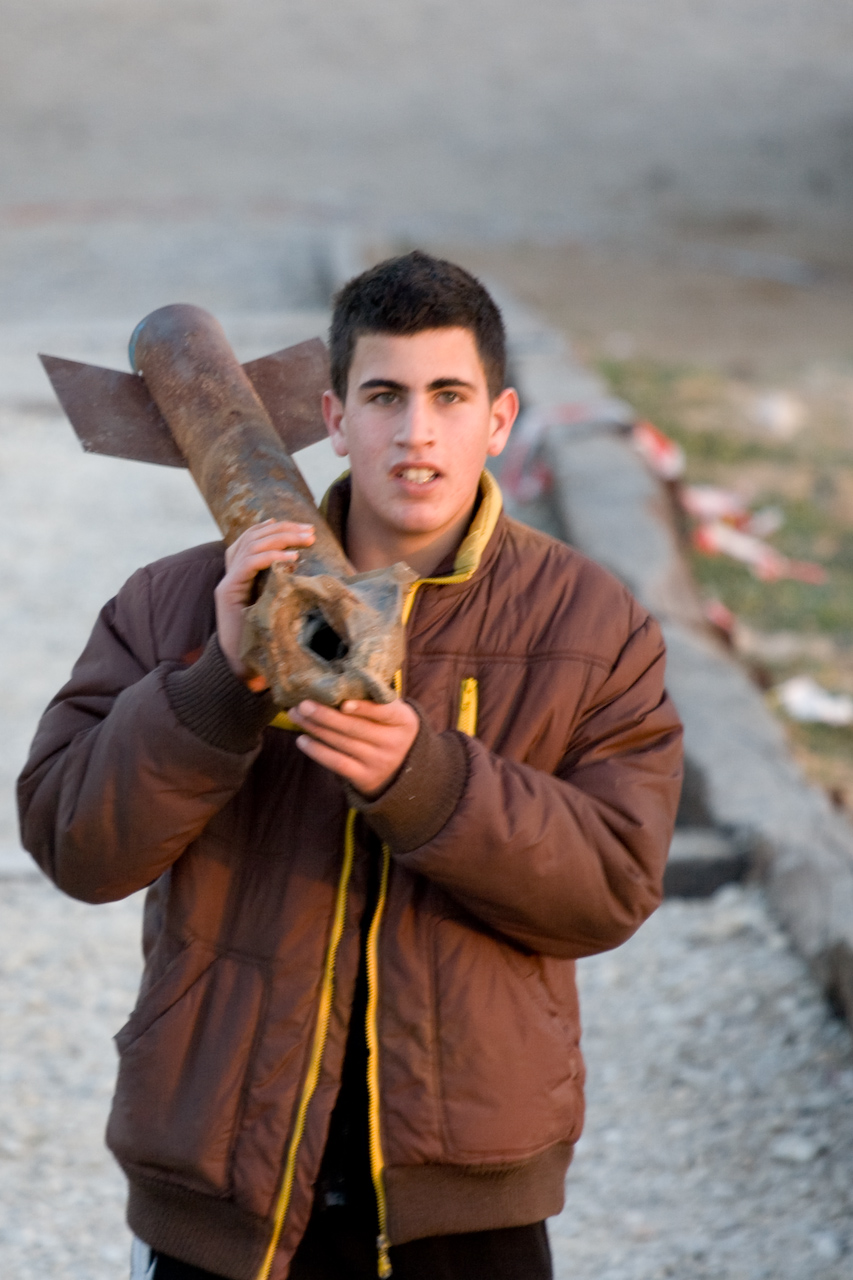
A boy carries a spent Qassam rocket in Sderot

Attacks began in 2001. Since then (August 2014 data), almost 20,000 rockets have hit southern Israel, all but a few thousand of them since Israel withdrew from the Gaza Strip in August 2005. Hamas justified these as counter-attacks to the Israeli blockade of Gaza. The rockets have killed 28 people and injured hundreds more. The range of the rockets has increased over time. The original Qassam rocket has a range of about 10 km (6.2 mi) but more advanced rockets, including versions of the old Soviet Grad or Katyusha have hit Israeli targets 40 km (25 mi) from Gaza.

Some analysts see the attacks as a shift away from reliance on suicide bombing, which was previously Hamas's main method of attacking Israel, as an adoption of the rocket tactics used by the Lebanese group Hezbollah.

=== Participating groups ===
All the Palestinian armed groups carry out rocket and mortar attacks, with varying frequency. The main groups are Hamas, Islamic Jihad, the Popular Front for the Liberation of Palestine, the Popular Resistance Committees, Fatah, and the Democratic Front for the Liberation of Palestine. In June 2007, Hamas took over from Fatah as the de facto governing authority in the Gaza Strip, while Fatah holds the presidency of the Palestinian National Authority.

Islamic Jihad has involved other Palestinians in the activities, running summer camps where children were taught how to hold a Qassam rocket launcher. One Islamic Jihad rocket maker, Awad al-Qiq, was a science teacher and headmaster at a United Nations school. Christopher Gunness, a UNRWA spokesman, said the UN had "zero-tolerance policy towards politics and militant activities in our schools", but that they "cannot police people's minds."

A 2007 report by Human Rights Watch found "little evidence that Palestinian security forces were making efforts to prevent rocket attacks or to hold responsible the militants who launch them." In some cases, "Palestinian security officials themselves acknowledged they were not acting to stop the attacks."

The Israeli Intelligence and Terrorism Information Center estimated that in 2007 the proportions of rockets fired from the Gaza Strip were:

34% – Palestinian Islamic Jihad (Al Quds)
22% – Hamas (Qassam)
8% – Fatah (Kafah)
6% – Popular Resistance Committees (al Nasser)
30% – unknown

== History ==
Rocket attacks fired at Israel from the Gaza Strip, 2001-2021

=== 1975 ===
On 3 May 1975 at 4:15 am, two 107mm rockets struck Jerusalem's central area, not far from the Jerusalem Botanical Gardens.

=== 2001–06 ===
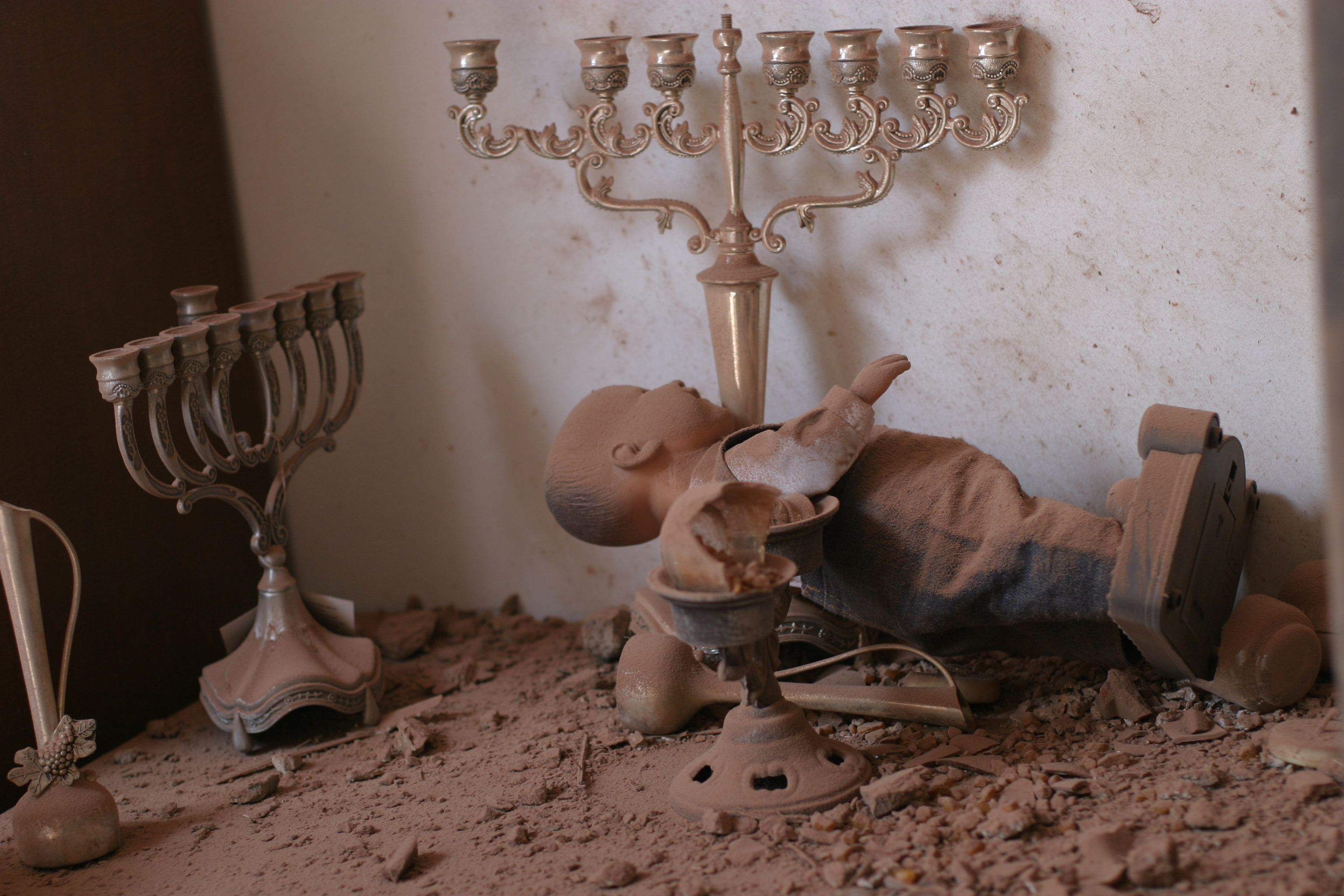
A house in Sderot hit by a Qassam rocket

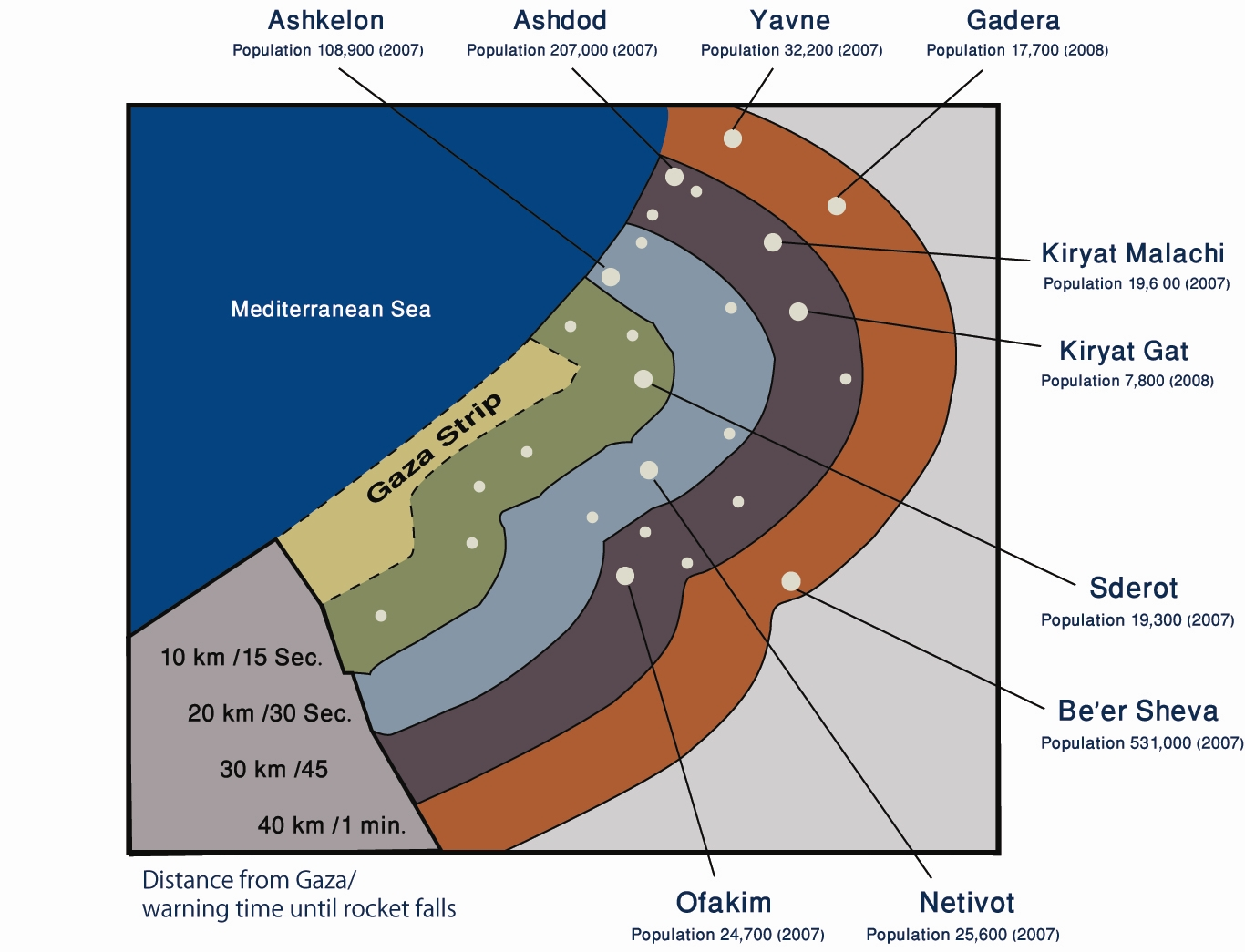
This map shows the rocket ranges as they relate to the population of southern Israel, and how much time people have to take cover given the distance the rocket travels.

Rockets were originally fired mainly on Sderot, an Israeli city on the border of the Gaza Strip. Sderot's population density is slightly greater than that of the Gaza Strip. Due to this, and despite the imperfect aim of these homemade projectiles, they have caused deaths and injuries, as well as significant damage to homes and property, psychological distress and emigration from the city. Ninety percent of the city's residents have had a rocket exploding in their street or an adjacent one.

On 28 March 2006, while Israelis went to general elections, the first Katyusha rocket from Gaza was fired at Israel. The rocket fell near the Itfah kibbutz on the outskirts of Ashkelon and caused no damage or casualties. Islamic Jihad claimed responsibility. Several months later, On 5 July 2006, a rocket hit the center of Ashkelon for the first time, striking an empty high school. Israeli Prime Minister Ehud Olmert called the attack, which was claimed by Hamas, an "escalation of unprecedented gravity", but the event was quickly overshadowed by the 2006 Lebanon War.

On 25 May 2006 the al-Aqsa Martyrs' Brigades group that published in April 2006 that they had been launching long-range missile on Israeli cities, sent a letter to Ramattan that they had developed chemical and biological weapons and threaten with chemical warfare. later that month report of use of chemical weapons by that group had been published in the media.

On 8 June, an event occurred that formed part of a 'chronology of crisis' leading to the most intense barrage of rocket attacks during 2006. Although Israel acknowledged that Hamas was largely sticking to the February 2005 cease-fire (in Fatah-controlled Gaza), it recommenced assassinations of Hamas leaders with the killing of Jamal Abu Samhadana. The Israeli military said Samhadana and the other targeted militants were planning an attack on Israel. The next day, in response to the assassination and calls for revenge, Islamic Jihad fired rockets at Israel, and a few hours later the IDF retaliated in turn with a bombardment of launch sites on a Gaza beach near Beit Lahia. During the time span of the IDF bombardment, a civilian Gaza family, the Ghalias, was all but wiped out in an explosion. In response to the assassination of its Ministry official and the civilian 'beach' deaths, Hamas announced that it was going to recommence rocket attacks. This was followed by a series of mutual attacks and reprisals between the IDF and Gaza factions, culminating in the abduction of two suspected Hamas members, and, on the following day, of IDF Corporal Gilad Shalit. The latter event gave rise to Operation Summer Rains, as a result of which Gaza's electricity network was damaged, and 402 Palestinians and 7 Israelis were killed.

=== 2007 ===
On 5 January 2007 Palestinian militants fired a Katyusha rocket at Ashkelon. The Katyusha has a range of 18–20 kilometers, and the rocket was fired from the Al-Atatra region in the northern Gaza Strip, traveling about 17 kilometers before reaching its target. No one was hurt in the Katyusha attack. On 7 October 2007 the Popular Resistance Committees claimed responsibility for a Grad-type Katyusha that hit Netivot. During this period, Katyusha attacks from Gaza were rare.

=== 2008–09 ===
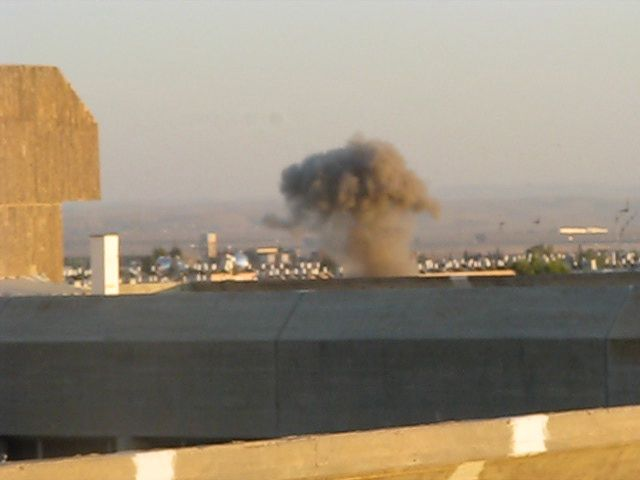
A Grad missile hits Beersheba, 2009.

In January 2008 the border between Gaza and Egypt was breached by Hamas. It allowed them to bring in Russian and Iranian-made rockets with a larger range.

In the first half of 2008, the number of attacks rose sharply, consistently totaling several hundred per month. In addition, Ashkelon was hit many times during this period by Grad rockets.

On 26 February 2008, a Grad rocket hit the hospital grounds of the Barzilai Medical Center, approximately 200 meters away from the neonatal intensive-care unit. As it is only 6 miles away from the Gaza border, it is the frequently the target of rocket attacks, with 140 rockets fired at it over the course of one weekend.

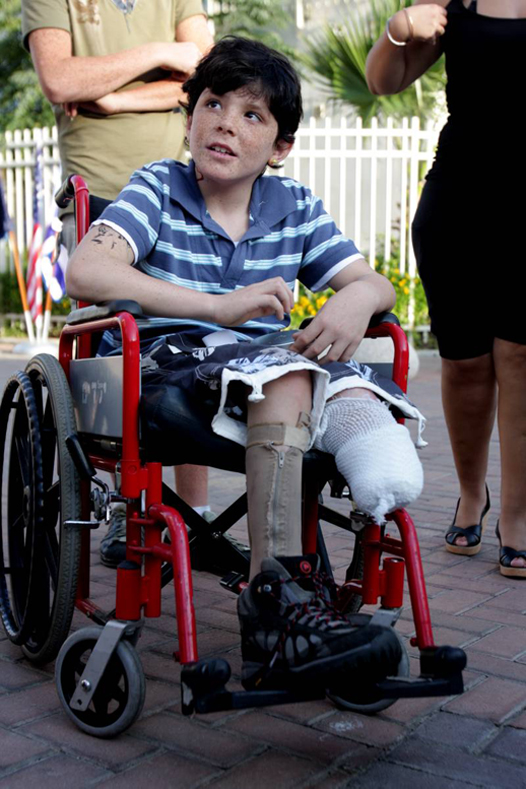
Osher Twito, an Israeli boy disabled by Palestinian rocket fire.

After reports of shells with white phosphorus launched against southern parts of Israel on 14 January 2009, Israeli medical emergency forces are now taught how to treat white phosphorus victims and are ordered to have equipment to handle white phosphorus.

From 19 June to 19 December 2008, an Egyptian-mediated ceasefire between Israel and Hamas was in effect. During this time, only several dozen rockets were fired at Israel, a marked decrease from the pre-ceasefire period. Hamas imprisoned some of those firing rockets.

During the Gaza War, Palestinian militants began to deploy improved Qassam and factory-made rockets with a range of 40 kilometers. Rockets reached major Israeli cities Ashdod, Beersheba and Gedera for the first time, putting one-eighth of Israel's population in rocket range and raising concerns about the safety of the Tel Aviv metropolitan area, Israel's largest population center, as well as the Negev Nuclear Research Center. According to Israeli authorities, 571 rockets and 205 mortar shells landed in Israel during the 22 days of the conflict.

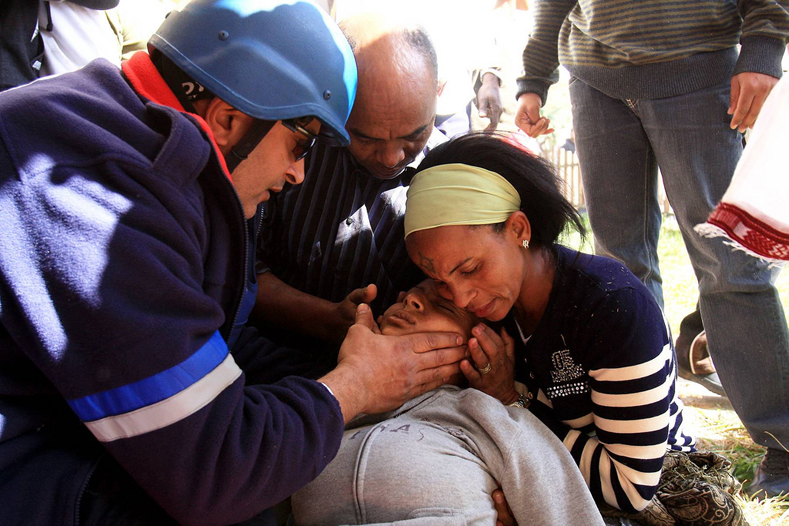
An Israeli woman injured by a Hamas Grad rocket fired at Beer Sheva from Gaza.

On 18 January 2009, following a unilateral ceasefire declaration by Israel, Hamas and Islamic Jihad announced that they would cease rocket attacks for one week. After that, rockets and mortar attacks continued almost daily through February.

=== 2010 ===
According to the Israel Security Agency's annual report, Palestinians carried out 150 rocket launches and 215 mortar launches at Israel during the year. This represented a decrease in both types of attacks compared to 2009, in which there were 569 rocket launches and 289 mortar launches.

The report said Iran succeeded in smuggling 1,000 mortar shells and hundreds of short-range rockets into the Gaza Strip over the course of the year. The security agency also warned that the Sinai Desert was turning into Hamas's "backyard" for operations and storage of arms. 2010 saw two unique instances of Hamas firing rockets from the Sinai at the southern Israeli port city of Eilat.

On 18 March, Thai national Manee Singmueangphon was killed by a Palestinian Qassam rocket launched at a greenhouse in Netiv Haasara. Both Ansar al Sunna, an Islamist group thought to have links with al-Qaeda in Iraq, and al Aqsa Martyrs' Brigades, the military wing of Palestinian President Mahmoud Abbas's Fatah party, claimed responsibility for the attack.

On 30 July, a Hamas Grad missile hit a residential neighborhood in the heart of the Israeli coastal city of Ashkelon. No one was physically injured, but eight people suffered from shock and surrounding apartment buildings sustained damage.

On 2 August, Hamas militants in Egypt fired seven Iranian-made Grad missiles at the resort city of Eilat in the extreme south of Israel. Overshot missiles hit the Jordanian city of Aqaba, killing one person and wounding several.

On 20 October, an accidental explosion occurred at a Hamas Qassam rocket training site in the densely crowded Tel As-Sultan neighborhood of Rafah in the southern Gaza Strip. Thirteen people were injured by flying shrapnel, including five children and three women.

=== 2011 ===
Over the course of 2011, 680 rockets, mortars and Grad missiles were fired from the Gaza Strip into Israel. At the end of 2010, Palestinian Islamic Jihad said it and other Palestinians militant groups in the Gaza Strip would temporarily halt rocket attacks against Israel. On 7 January, it claimed responsibility for a mortar attack that injured three agricultural workers, and the group was responsible for most of the attacks on Israel in the first two weeks of the year. On 12 January, the group declared again that it would cease firing rockets. Multiple, unclaimed rocket and mortar attacks occurred on 16, 17 and 18 January.

On 2 January, it was revealed that two East Jerusalem Arabs, employees of the British Consulate General in Jerusalem, were arrested for suspected involvement in an aborted Hamas plot to fire a missile at Teddy Stadium during a soccer match. The two were charged the following day with weapons trafficking.

On 15 March, Israel seized the Victoria, a ship containing concealed Iranian missiles destined for the Gaza Strip.

On 27 March, Israel first deployed the new Iron Dome missile defense system to protect Beersheba. The city, one of Israel's largest, had recently been targeted again by Palestinian missiles after being safe since the 2008–2009 Gaza War. A week later, a second battery was deployed to protect Ashkelon. On 7 April, the Ashkelon battery successfully intercepted a Palestinian Grad missile fired at the city, marking the first successful interception of a short-range rocket in history. On 31 August, Israel deployed a third battery outside Ashdod before the new school year. As of that date, Iron Dome had intercepted several dozen Gazan rockets at an estimated cost of $100,000 per interception, not including the price of the system itself.

On 4 April, Israel indicted alleged Hamas "rocket godfather" Dirar Abu Sisi in the Beersheba District Court. Abu Sisi had reportedly been captured by Israel in Ukraine a month prior. He denied any wrongdoing.

On 7 April, Hamas militants fired a Kornet anti-tank missile at an Israel school bus. The sole passenger on board, 16-year-old boy Daniel Viflic, was killed.

On 18 August, a series of cross-border attacks were carried out in southern Israel near the Egyptian border. The initial attacks sparked several days of clashes between Israel and Palestinian militant groups that resulted in substantial casualties to both sides.

=== 2012 ===
The Jerusalem Post and Ynet news reported that in January 2012, two mortars were fired from Gaza into the area governed by the Eshkol Regional Council which were determined by the Israeli military to have contained white phosphorus; the shells were reported to have landed in open fields, causing no injuries or damage. The newspaper said the Eshkol Regional Council filed a formal complaint with the United Nations, noting that the Geneva Conventions prohibit the use of phosphorus against civilians.

Until April 2012 more than 360 rocket and mortar attacks had been launched (~300 during the March 2012 Gaza–Israel clashes).

The Ynet newsreported that In May 2012 the Islamic Jihad published video footage of a multi-barrel rocket launcher mounted on vehicle

On 24 October 2012, "[m]ore than 65 rockets were fired into southern Israel from the Gaza Strip." A woman in Ashkelon, three foreign workers, and a policeman received injuries. "Several people were treated for shock," according to JNS.org.

=== 2013 ===
On 21 March, during US President Barack Obama's official visit to Israel, Palestinians in Beit Hanoun fired four rockets at the Israeli city of Sderot, triggering alarms in local communities and forcing residents on their way to work or school to run to bomb shelters. One rocket hit the backyard of a home in the city, spraying shrapnel into the walls and shattering windows. A second projectile landed in an open area within the surrounding Sha'ar Hanegev Regional Council. The two remaining rockets were believed to have landed within the Gaza Strip. The Mujahedeen Shura Council, a Palestinian Salafi group, claimed responsibility for the attack

On 2 April, Palestinians attempted to fire two mortar shells into Israel; both landed within the Gaza Strip. Later, in the evening, a third projectile was fired into the Eshkol Regional Council. The Mujahedeen Shura Council claimed responsibility for the attacks. Israel responded to the attacks with air strikes on two targets in the Gaza Strip that night, causing no injuries. This was the first such strike since Operation Pillar of Defense. Israeli Defense Minister Moshe Yaalon said: "[W]e see Hamas as being responsible for everything that is fired from the Strip at Israel. We won't allow any routine involving a drizzle of rockets at our civilians and forces."

On 3 April, Palestinians from Gaza fired two rockets at the Israeli city of Sderot. The rockets struck during the morning as children were arriving to school, triggering the alert siren and sending families into bomb shelters for cover. The United Nations special envoy to the Middle East Robert Serry condemned the "indiscriminate firing of rockets into civilian areas" and also called on Israel to exercise restraint. France said it "harshly condemns" the rocket fire on the "civilian population in south Israel". Israeli Prime Minister Benjamin Netanyahu said: "If the quiet is violated, we will respond strongly".

On 4 April, Palestinians again fired a rocket and three mortar shells at Israel. A rocket landed in an open area in the Eshkol Regional Council at around 2 am, triggering alarms in nearby communities, while two of the mortars fell within the Gaza Strip.

On 29 April, a rocket was fired from the Gaza Strip which impacted southern Israel, causing no casualties or damage.

On 19 June, three Grad rockets were fired from the Gaza Strip, hitting the Israeli town of Ashkelon. The attacks caused no injuries, marking the first time that rockets had been fired from Gaza since 29 April.

=== 2014 ===
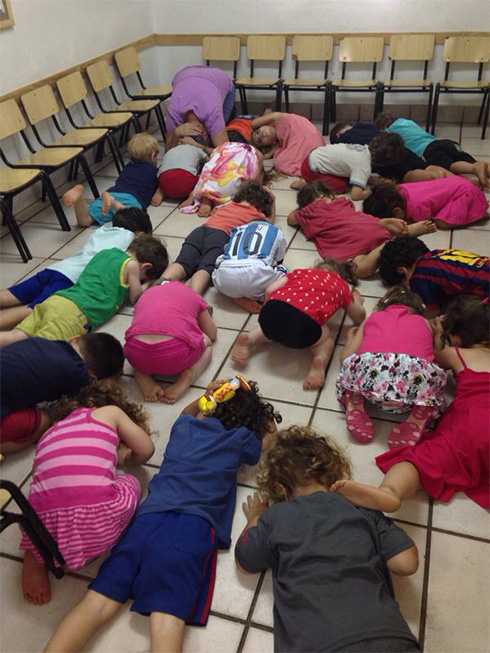
Operation Protective Edge: A kindergarten in central Israel during a rocket alarm

On 5 March, the Israeli Navy intercepted a ship containing dozens of long-range rockets being smuggled from Iran to the Gaza Strip.

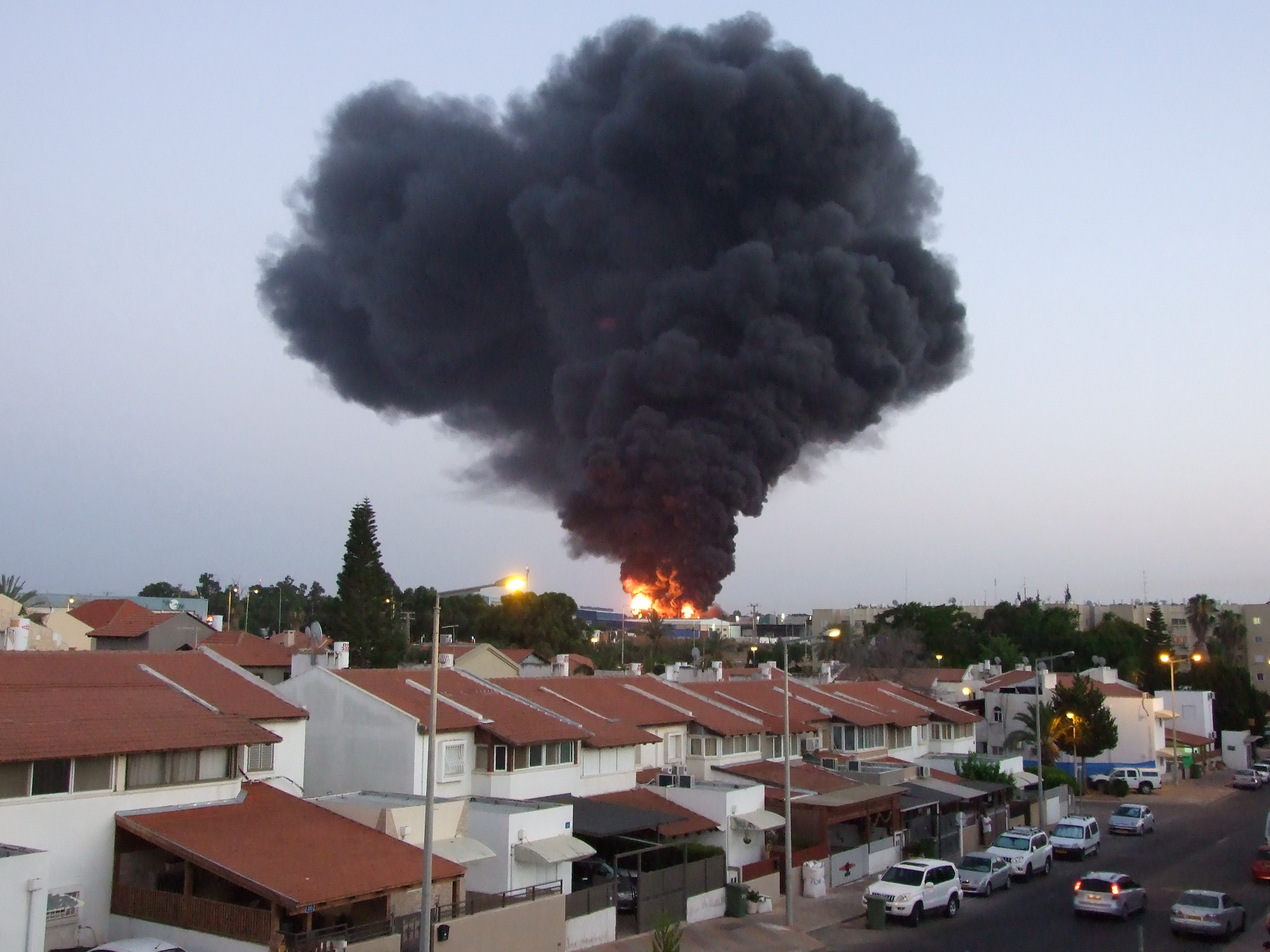
Factory bursts in flames after rocket attack in Sderot, Israel, 28 June 2014

On 10 March, Hamas, the Palestinian Islamist group that controls the Gaza Strip, unveiled a monument to its rocket attacks on Israeli cities and towns, a life-sized model of an M-75 rocket in Gaza City. The group declared that the attacks "managed to take the battle to the heart of the Zionist entity (Israel)".

On 8 July, Operation Protective Edge commenced in response to rocket fire from the Gaza Strip, ending on 26 August. In this time period, between 2500 and 3000 rockets were launched.

Throughout July and August 2014, Hamas and other Palestinian armed groups launched thousands of unguided rockets and mortars toward Israel.

=== 2015 ===
In 2015, there were 23 Palestinian rocket attacks on Israel, according to the IDF.

On 23 April, Israel's 67th independence day, a rocket was fired from the Gaza Strip at Israel. The rocket hit an open field in the Sha'ar HaNegev region near Sderot, causing no injuries or damage.

On 27 May, an M-75 or Grad missile impacted in Gan Yavne, a city east of Ashdod. No reports of injuries or damage were noted initially.

=== 2016 ===
In 2016, there were 15 Palestinian rocket attacks on Israel.

=== 2017 ===
The Israeli military reported that 35 rockets and mortars were launched from the Gaza Strip in 2017, the vast majority of them in December. This wave of rocket attacks came amid Palestinian outrage over the United States government decision to move its embassy in Israel to Jerusalem. The rockets did not cause any fatalities or serious injuries. The Israeli military attributed the attacks to Palestinian Islamic Jihad and other Salafi groups. Israel retaliated to the attacks by striking Hamas positions, causing two deaths. Hamas conducted a series of arrests of Salafi militants it said were responsible for rocket attacks.

=== 2018 ===
Hundreds of rockets were fired at Israel during the Gaza-Israel clashes of November 2018. As of 13 November 2018 at least one civilian fatality has been reported in Ashkelon, with 70 reported as wounded. The man who was killed was a Palestinian who had moved to Israel from occupied Hebron.

The Iron dome has successfully intercepted around 100 of the 370 rockets that have been fired. After the attacks, the IDF announced that it had struck over 100 targets in the Gaza Strip including a weapons factory, munitions warehouse and Hamas' Public Security offices. Hamas responded to the air strikes by making additional threats against Be'er Sheva and Ashdod. The attacks had a significant effect on businesses in southern Israel as restaurant patrons cancelled their reservations. The finance minister announced that Israeli businesses in certain regions would be compensated for losses. All schools within 40 km of Gaza were closed; the Israel Tax Authority has promised compensation to parents who were unable to go to work because they had to stay home with their children.

=== 2021 ===
On the evening between 23 and 24 April 2021 36 rockets were fired towards Israel from Gaza, six of which were intercepted by the Israel Defense Forces' Iron Dome defense system. Although there were no injuries, property was damaged in several communities in Israel. The Israeli military responded with military strikes in Gaza.

On 10 May 2021 Hamas took credit for firing 7 rockets at Jerusalem and Beit Shemesh from Gaza, in what Hamas said was a response to injuries of over 300 Arabs in clashes with Israeli police outside al Aqsa mosque. One of the missiles was intercepted by the Iron Dome missile defense system, and at least one of the other rockets landed in a village west of Jerusalem. Some homes were damaged, but no casualties were reported. In a separate incident, an Israeli driver was wounded when an anti-tank missile fired from Gaza hit the vehicle. Islamic Jihad took credit for that attack.

=== 2023 ===
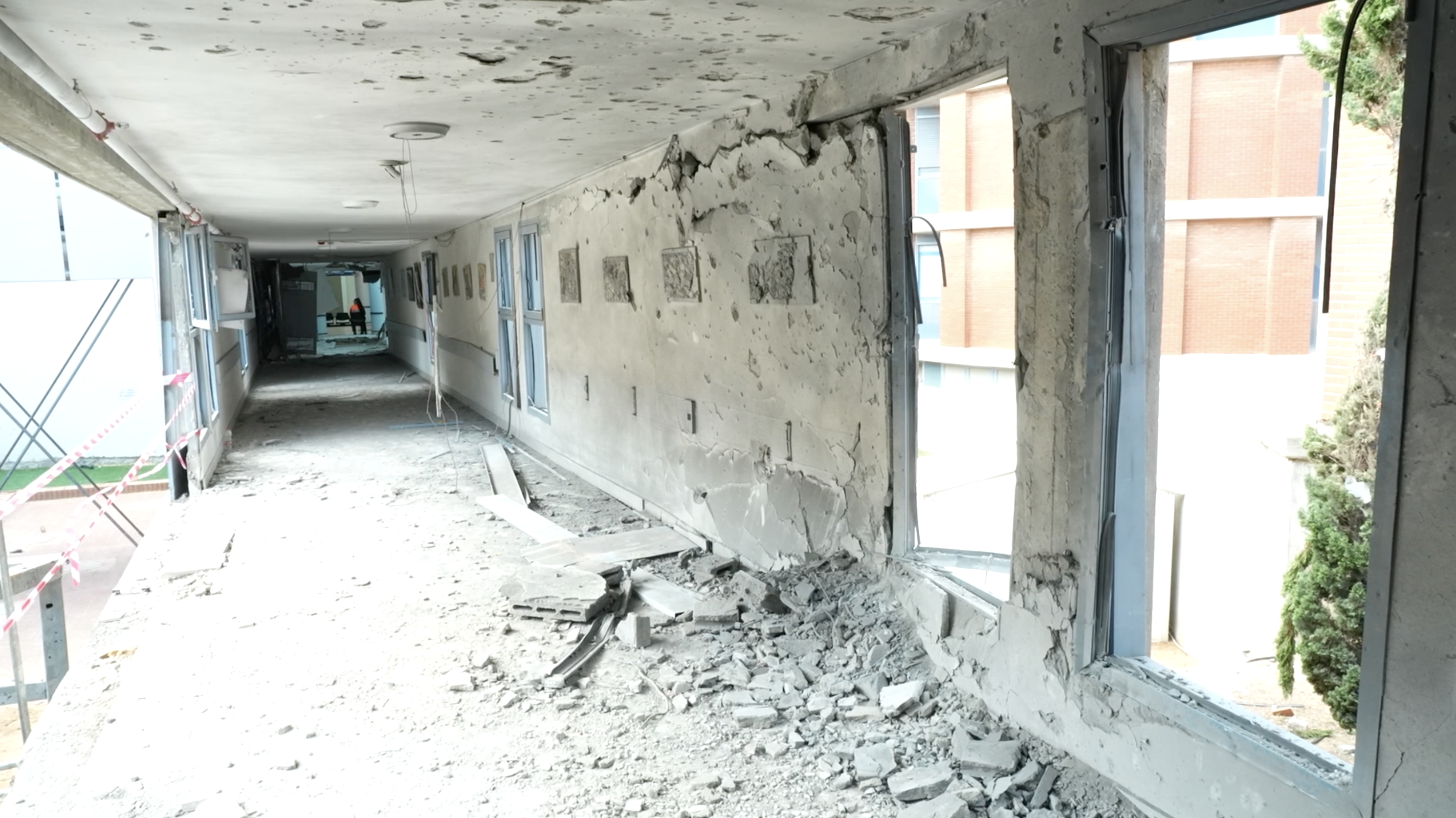
Aftermath of a Hamas rocket hit on the maternity ward of Barzilai Medical Center, a hospital in southern Israel, on October 8, 2023

Throughout April 2023, Hamas launched multiple rocket salvoes targeting Israel, first from Lebanon and then from Syria, with the latter attack targeted at the then Israeli-occupied Golan Heights.

On 7 October 2023, Hamas launched an incursion into Israel starting with a rocket barrage of over 5,000 missiles against Israeli targets, one of the fascets of the attacks that initiated the Gaza war. It was later discovered that the 7 October rocket attacks included a strike on Sdot Micha Airbase, a base believed to house nuclear-capable missiles.

Between October 2023 and January 2024 more than 10,600 rockets and mortar shells were launched at Israel, with 10% of them failing.

== Tactics ==
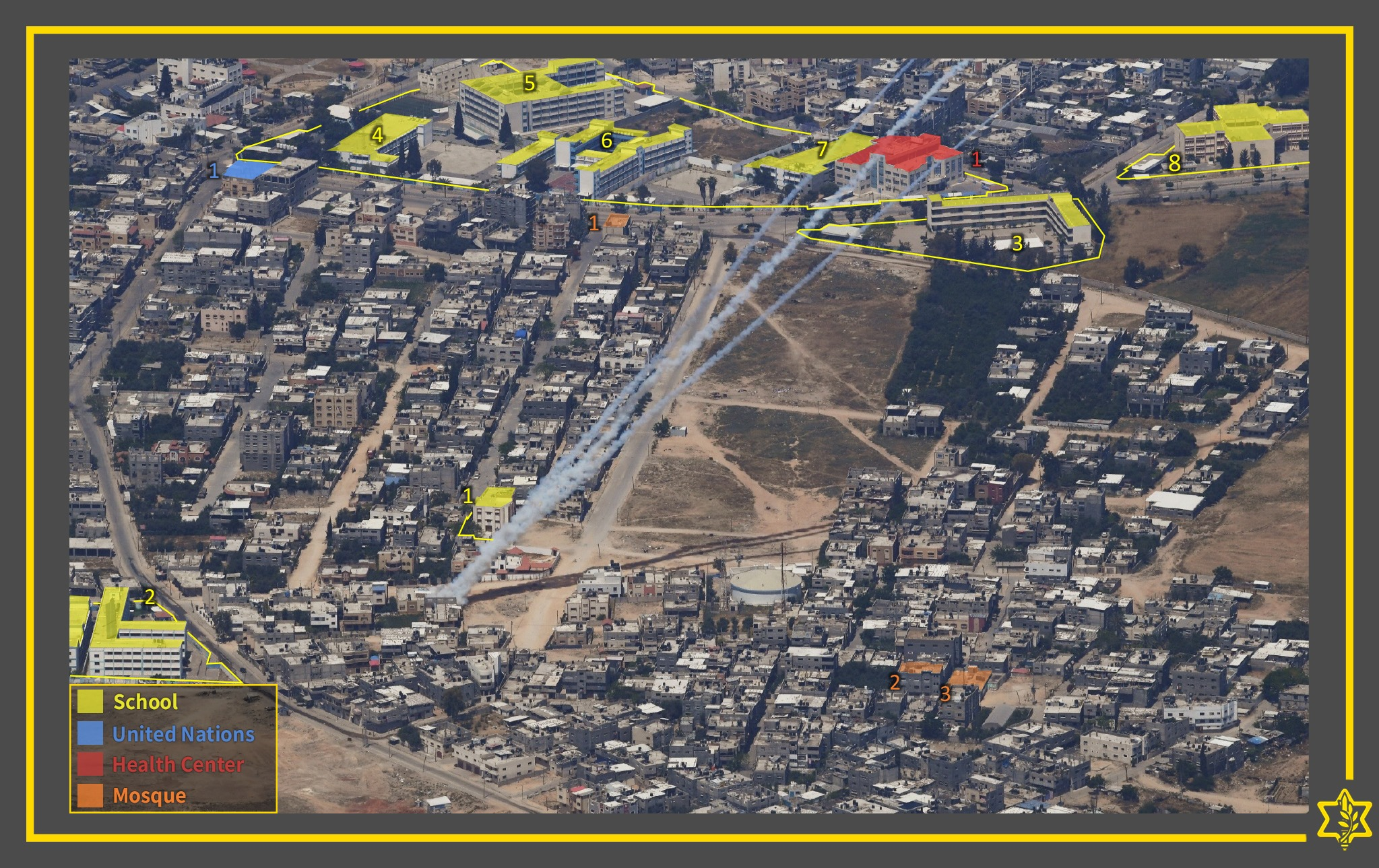
IDF image of a Hamas rocket barrage launched from a densely populated area during the 2021 Israel–Palestine crisis.

Khaled Jaabari, Gaza commander of the al-Aqsa Martyr's Brigades, said that the group uses Google Earth to determine targets. Rocket fire occasionally occurs in the early morning when children head to school.

A source close to Hamas described the movement's tactic of launching projectiles from between homes during the 2008-2009 Israel-Gaza conflict: "They fired rockets in between the houses and covered the alleys with sheets so they could set the rockets up in five minutes without the planes seeing them. The moment they fired, they escaped, and they are very quick." Videos released by Hamas in 2011 show Qassam rockets being fired from residential areas and mosques. According to Yedioth Aharonoth journalist Elior Levy, "Gaza terror cells choose to fire from urban areas knowing that the Israel Defense Forces refrain from intercepting them for fear of hurting civilians. The killing of civilians in Gaza also serves the terrorists' purposes who claim Israel is committing war crimes in Gaza".

It has been documented, that Arab terrorist groups and Hamas placed weapons and missile launchers in densely populated areas. Human Rights Watch issued a report condemning the firing of Kassam rockets as "war crimes", stating "None of these rockets can be reliably aimed... Such weapons are inherently indiscriminate when directed towards densely populated areas. The absence of Israeli military forces in the areas struck by the rockets, as well as statements from the leaders of Hamas and other armed groups, indicate that many of these attacks are deliberately intended to strike Israeli civilians and civilian structures... Hamas and other Palestinian armed groups have frequently violated the laws of war by firing rockets from within populated areas..." Indiscriminate attacks on civilians and civilian structures that do not discriminate between civilians and military targets are illegal under international law.

=== Denial of service attacks on emergency services ===
There have been reports in the Israeli press about denial of service attacks by Palestinians on the Magen David Adom and other emergency call lines after rocket and mortar attacks, that resulted in a development of a filtering system that had been installed in MDA and other emergency call systems.

== Israeli defensive measures ==
=== Fortifications and bomb shelters ===
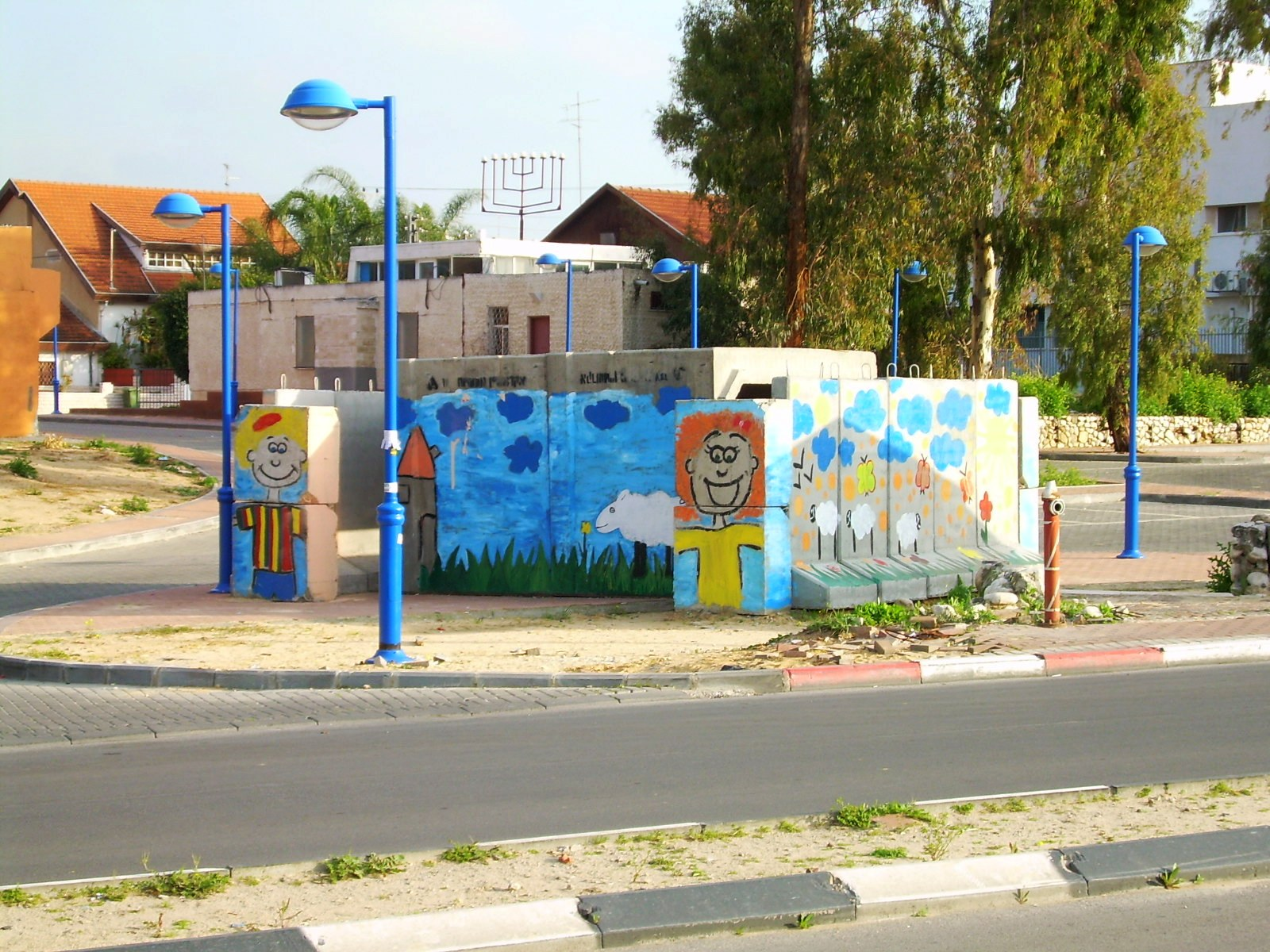
Bomb shelter in Sderot

A guidance paper by the Israeli home front command, that is given for each household in Israel, include sections for basic treatment of chemical warfare victims. The Home Front Command performs periodic training for citizens for chemical and biological attacks. As of 2006 all public educational facilities in confrontation areas are ordered to be built bomb proof (can sustain a direct hit from a katusha missile) and must have an option to be connected to chemical and biological purifying systems, with an exception for kindergartens and special care education systems that must have a central air purifying system. All medical or treatment facilities must have a shelter that can be gas proof (can be sealed in a form that the only source of air would be via the purifying ventilation systems) with connection to purifying systems. All long-term treatments facilities must be built as a bomb shelter and must be built to sustain 4 hours of isolation.

Residential buildings and homes in Israel built after 1990 are generally equipped with Merkhav Mugan. Single- or two-story buildings built between 1982 and 1990 in the northern parts are equipped with a fortified route (sometimes below ground level) into a public bomb shelter. Older buildings generally lack these fortifications. (All buildings built between 1951 - 1982 are designed with access for neighborhood public bomb shelters). As of February 2009, approximately 5,000 residents of southern Israel, mostly elderly immigrants from the former Soviet Union, lacked proper reinforced rooms or reasonable access to public shelters. Many Sderot families sleep together in a single fortified room in their homes.

In March 2008 the Israeli Government placed 120 fortified bus stops in Sderot, following a Defense Ministry assessment that most Qassam-related injuries and fatalities were caused by shrapnel wounds in victims on the street. As of January 2009, all schools in Sderot have been fortified against rockets; fortifications consist of arched canopies over roofs. On 3 January 2009 a Grad rocket penetrated the fortification of a school in Ashkelon.

In March 2009, Sderot inaugurated a reinforced children's recreation center built by the Jewish National Fund. The purpose of the center, which has "$1.5 million worth of reinforced steel", is to provide a rocket-proof place for children to play. Sderot also has a "missile-protected playground", with concrete tunnels painted to look like caterpillars.

Video of Israelis running to bomb shelters during a rocket attack.

As of 18 February 2010 all public safe places (Merkah mugan/bomb shelter) must be built with gas and liquid filtering systems (can defend from a chemical and biological missile attack for several hours), And as of 18 May 2010 any new household without that will not be approved with form No. 4 (the ability to connect a house to electricity and water)

=== Red Color ===
The Israeli government has installed an alarm system called "Red Color" (צבע אדום) to warn citizens of impending rocket attacks, although its effectiveness has been questioned. The system currently operates in a number of southern Israeli cities within rocket range. When the signature of a rocket launch is detected originating in Gaza, the system automatically activates the public broadcast warning system in nearby Israeli communities and military bases. A two-tone electronic audio alert (with a pattern of high, 2 second pause, high-low) is broadcast twice, followed by a recorded female voice intoning the Hebrew words for Red Color ("Tzeva Adom"). The entire program is repeated until all rockets have impacted and no further launches are detected. In Sderot, it gives residents approximately 15 seconds warning of an incoming rocket. The system was installed in Ashkelon between July 2005 and April 2006.

=== Iron Dome ===
Iron Dome (Hebrew: כיפת ברזל) is a mobile system developed by Rafael Advanced Defense Systems designed to intercept short-range rockets with a range less than 70 km. In February 2007, the system was selected by Israeli Defense Minister Ehud Barak as the Israeli Defense Force's defense system against short-range rockets. On 7 July 2008, the first test of the system was completed successfully, and the first operational test was expected to take place at the end of 2009. The system was scheduled to be operational in 2010, but was temporarily delayed. In March, the system was deployed in several strategic sites near major Israeli southern cities. On 7 April 2011, the system successfully intercepted a Grad rocket launched from Gaza for the first time.

The system is composed of a radar, a control center, and interceptor missiles. Very limited information has been made available about the system in the Israeli media, but from this information it is known that the interceptor missile (named Tamir) is equipped with electro-optic sensors and several steering fins, providing it with high maneuverability. The system's radar identifies the rocket launch, extrapolates its flight path and transfers this information to the control center, which then uses this information to determine the projected impact location. If the projected target justifies an interception, then an interceptor missile is fired.

== Effects ==
=== Casualties, fatalities and rockets fired ===
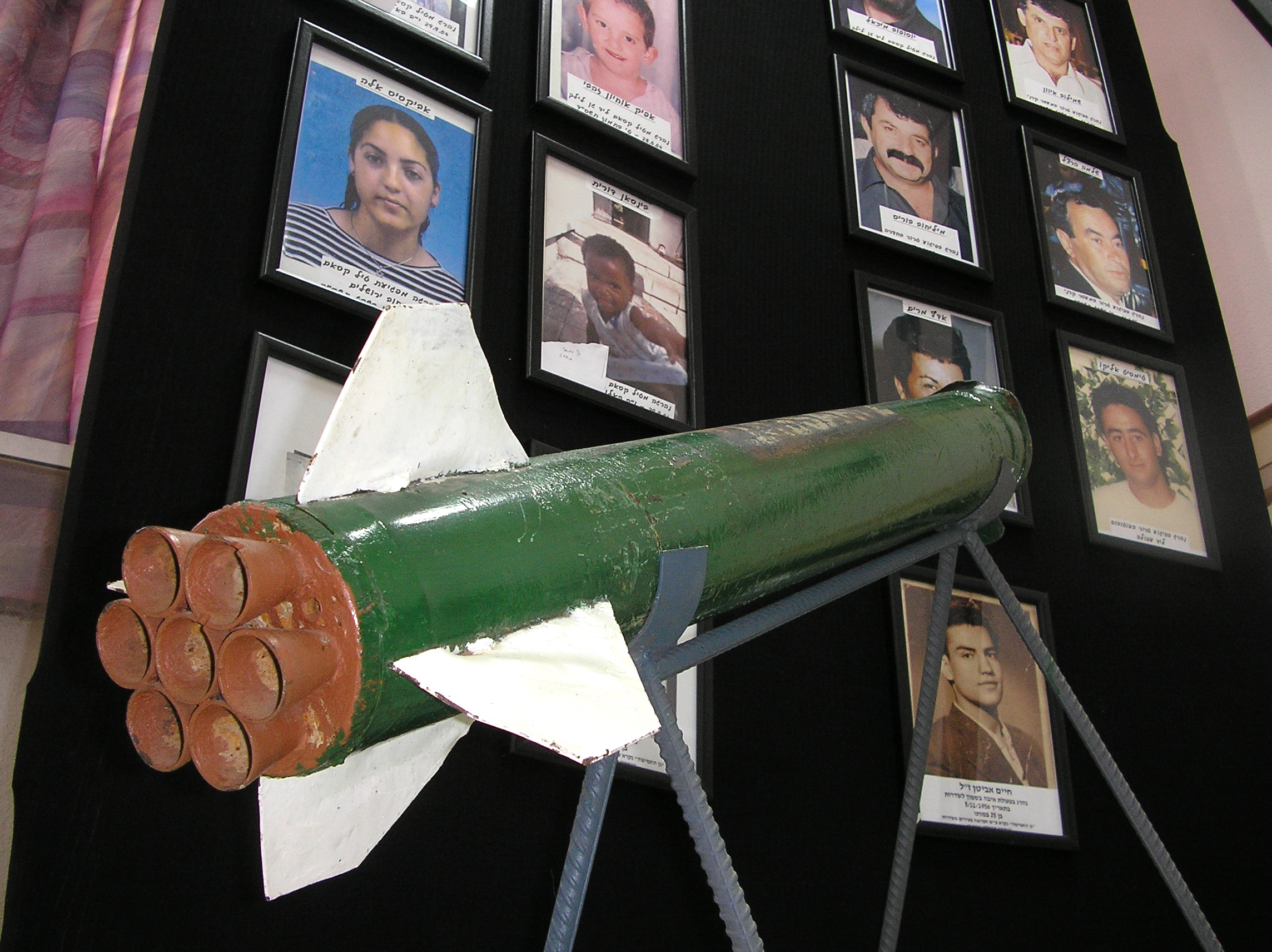
A Qassam rocket is displayed in Sderot town hall against a background of pictures of residents killed in rocket attacks

According to B'Tselem "from June 2004 to 23 July 2014, 26 Israeli civilians (four of them minors) and two foreign nationals were killed in Israel by Palestinian rocket and mortar fire. In addition, five soldiers were killed, three in Israel and two in the Gaza Strip. Another Israeli civilian and three foreign nationals were killed by rocket fire at settlements in the Gaza Strip, before they were evacuated." There were 3 more civilian casualties during the 2014 Israel-Gaza conflict. Most of those killed were civilians, including children. The first casualties from the rocket fire were a 4-year-old boy and his grandfather, who were killed in June 2004. Other victims include two small children, aged 2 and 4, who were killed while playing in the street later that same year, and a teenage girl, Ayala-Haya (Ella) Abukasis, who was struck and killed while shielding her younger brother. As of 2008, such rockets have demonstrated a kill ratio of 0.4 percent. In addition, more than 1,700 have been injured. Injuries have also occurred mainly among civilians, several of whom were injured very seriously.

=== Misfired rockets ===
Misfired rockets have also killed and injured Palestinians within the Gaza Strip. Due to restrictions on information politics and a lack of free press in the Gaza Strip, precisely reporting the number of Palestinian victims is difficult. As far as it became known, the missiles, rockets and mortars have killed six Palestinians and injured dozens more. On 8 June 2005, rockets fired at the Israeli settlement of Ganei Tal killed two Palestinian workers and one Chinese worker in a packing plant. On 2 August 2005, a rocket apparently launched by Islamic Jihad killed a 6-year-old boy and his father in Beit Hanoun. On 26 December 2008 a mortar aimed at Israel killed two Palestinian girls in the Gaza Strip, aged 5 and 12. In November 2012 three relatives, including infant son, of a BBC journalist Jehad Mashhrawi was killed by what was initially attributed to IDF strike, with photo of Jehad holding his dead son becoming viral in world media, but a few months later UN attributed the strike to a rocket fired from Gaza. On 25 June 2014 a child was killed by a misfired rocket. On 28 July 2014 Hamas rockets exploded inside Gaza killing seven and damaging Al-Shati refugee camp and Al-Shifa Hospital. On 8 May 2019 in a rare admission, Islamic Jihad confirmed that a Palestinian child was killed by their own misfired rocket. In 2022 overall 16 people estimated were killed by rockets falling short in Gaza. In 2021 HRW investigation revealed that Hamas rockets fired towards Israel also killed "undetermined" number of civilians in Gaza when they fell short. On 11 May 2023 a failed rocket killed four civilians in Beit Hanoun as out of 507 fired rockets 110 fell short in Gaza. In October 2023, the Al-Ahli Arab Hospital explosion was initially attributed to Israeli airstrike, until after independent evidence became available it was attributed to a misfired Islamic Jihad rocket.

=== Statistics ===
Precisely counting the number of rockets fired is impossible, and differing estimates have been given. The injury figures and attack counts below are attributed to the Israeli Ministry of Foreign Affairs. Prior to 4 September 2005, the majority of attacks were against Israeli targets within the Gaza Strip.

Annual number of attacks and casualties
| Year | Dead | Injured | Rocket attacks | Mortar attacks | Total attacks | Total attacks % change |
|---|---|---|---|---|---|---|
| 2001 | 0 | | 4 | | 4+ | |
| 2002 | 0 | | 35 | | 35+ | ▲775% |
| 2003 | 0 | | 155 | | 155+ | ▲343% |
| 2004 | 4 | | 281 | | 281+ | ▲81% |
| 2005 | 2 | | 401 | 854 | 1,255 | ▲346% |
| 2006 | 2 | 371 | 1,722 | 55 | 1,777 | ▲42% |
| 2007 | 2 | 578 | 1,276 | 1,531 | 2,807 | ▲58% |
| 2008 | 8 | 611 | 2,048 | 1,668 | 3,716 | ▲32% |
Israeli and Egyptian blockade of Gaza after Operation Cast Lead to stop missile fire into Israel and arms import into Gaza.
| 2009 | 0 | 11 | 569 | 289 | 858 | ▼77% |
| 2010 | 1 | 35 | 150 | 215 | 365 | ▼57% |
| 2011 | 2 | 81 | 419 | 261 | 680 | ▲86% |
| 2012 | 6 | 284+ | 2,256 | 17 | 2,273+ | ▲234% |
| 2013 | 0 | | 32 | 12 | 44 | ▼98% |
| 2014 | 6 | 80 | 2,800 | 1,700 | 4,500 | ▲9,000% |
| 2015* | 0 | 0 | 3 | 0 | 0 | ▼100% |
| Total* | 33 | 1971+ | 12,338 | 6,500 | 18,928 | |

*as of 6 June 2015

=== Displacement ===
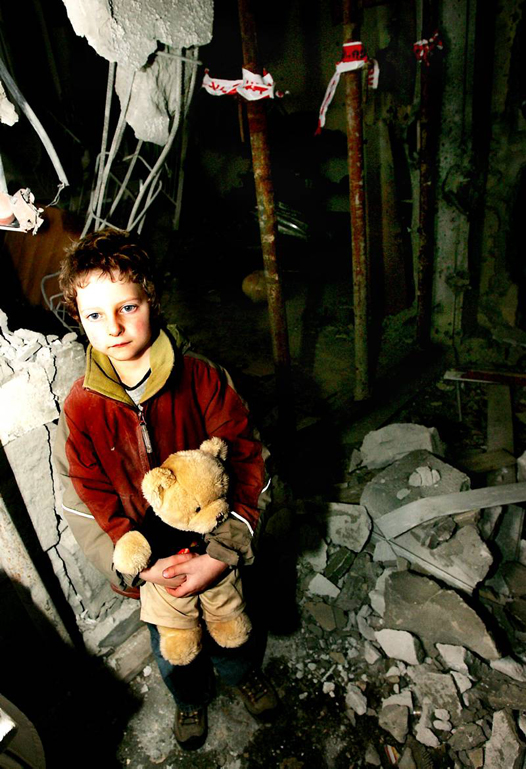
Israeli boy standing in the remains of his home after it was destroyed by a Qassam rocket

In May 2007, a significant increase in rocket attacks from Gaza prompted the temporary evacuation of thousands of residents from Sderot. According to the United Nations, 40 percent of the city's residents left in the last two weeks of May. During the summer of 2007, 3,000 of the city's 22,000 residents (comprising mostly the city's key upper and middle class residents) left for other areas, out of rocket range.

During the 2008–2009 conflict, a large section of the residents of Ashkelon, a southern coastal city put in range of Grad-type rockets since the beginning of the conflict, fled the city for the relative safety of central and northern Israel. On 10–11 January, according to Israeli media, 40 percent of the residents fled the city, despite calls by the Mayor to stay.

In February 2009, the BBC reported that 3,000 of Sderot's 24,000 residents had "upped and left".

=== Education ===
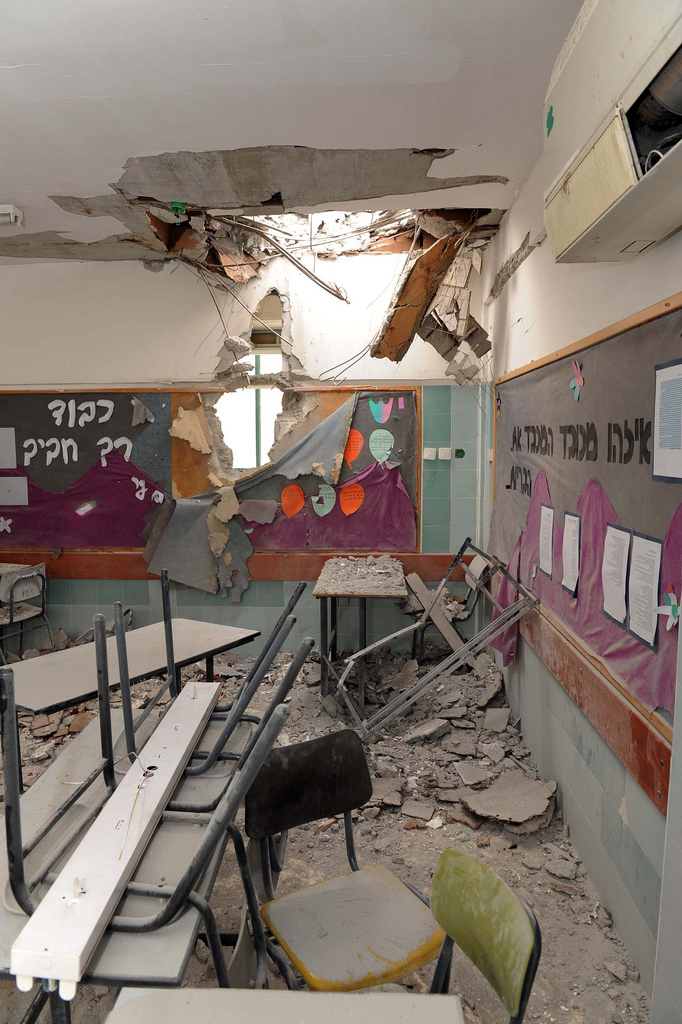
Kindergarten classroom in Beersheba struck by a Grad rocket

Israeli media reported on 28 May 2007 that only 800 out of a total of 3000 pupils in Sderot had turned up to schools.

During the 2008–2009 conflict, schools and universities in southern Israel closed due to rocket threats. Hamas rockets landed on Israeli educational facilities several times (such as empty schools in Beersheba) from 2008 to 2009, with no casualties as of 15 January, except for cases of shock. Studies resumed starting 11 January, with IDF Home Front Command representatives stationed at schools. Only schools with fortified classrooms and bomb shelters were allowed to bring in children. Israeli Education Minister Yuli Tamir said she hoped a return to school would provide a little structure and routine in a time of great stress and uncertainty for the children. Students were reluctant to return, with Sapir College in Sderot reporting less than 25 percent attendance after a student was killed by a rocket.

In March 2009, the Ashkelon urban parent committee decided to keep children out of schools following a surge in the number of rocket attacks on southern Israel and a Qassam hit on an empty school in the city. As a result, only 40 percent of school students and 60 percent of kindergarten children attended, though the municipality had decided to keep schools open.

=== Psychological ===
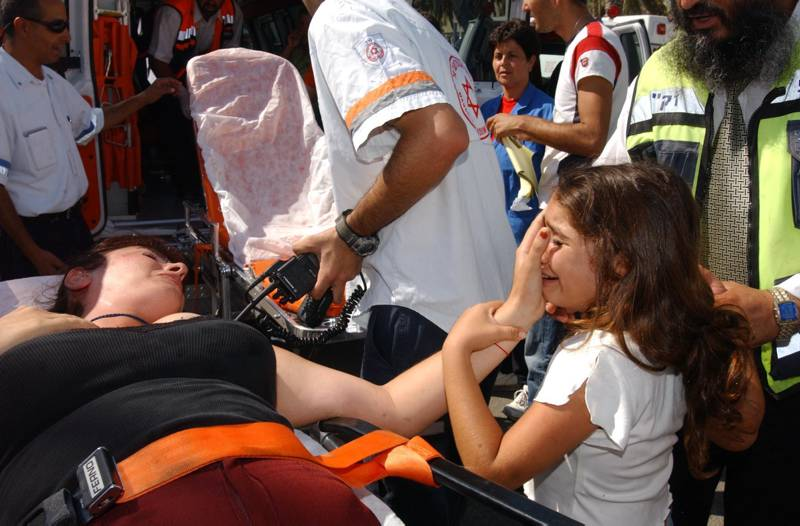
An injured woman in Sderot consoles her daughter as she is led away by an emergency medical team

In 2008, Natal, the Israel Center for Victims of Terror and War, conducted a study on the city of Sderot based on representative sampling. The study found that between 75 percent and 94 percent of Sderot children aged 4–18 exhibited symptoms of post-traumatic stress. 28 percent of adults and 30 percent of children had post-traumatic stress disorder (PTSD). The co-director of the study emphasized the distinction between post-traumatic stress symptoms, such as problems sleeping and concentrating, and PTSD itself, which can interfere seriously with daily life.

An American Psychiatric Association study published in 2010, headed by Professor Yair Bar-Haim of Tel Aviv University, found that incidence rate for post-traumatic symptoms among Israeli civilians was correlated with proximity to the Gaza Strip. Civilians who lived in areas where rockets frequently exploded, and where there was less warning time in advance of strikes, had a higher chance of developing post-traumatic symptoms than those living far enough from Gaza to have one minute or more in which to seek shelter after rockets were launched. The study also found that life under rocket fire sometimes led to cognitive disengagement from threat. Cognitive disengagement was positively correlated with the likelihood of developing pathologies such as post-traumatic stress disorder and depression.

During the Gaza War, when rockets were falling on the city of Ashdod, the municipality opened a treatment centre for those with shell shock.

According to a 2009 Amnesty International report,

Scores [of rockets] have struck homes, businesses, schools, other public buildings and vehicles in and around towns and villages in southern Israel. It is purely by chance that in most cases such strikes have not caused death or injury, and the lethal potential of such projectiles should not be underestimated. Above all, the constant threat of impending rocket attacks has caused fear and disrupted the lives of the growing number of Israelis who live within range of such attacks, reaching up to a million.

Also in 2009, a spokeswoman for the Sderot Hosen Center, which provides psychological support and rehabilitation for the community, reported that attacks had taken a high toll on the mental health of children and adults in and around Sderot.

Children are afraid to sleep on their own, to be on their own, even to go to the toilet alone. They feel that their parents cannot protect them. Bed wetting is a common manifestation of their anxiety and insecurity. Their parents are similarly anxious and frustrated. It is even difficult to speak of PTSD, for as long as the rockets fall the trauma is renewed daily; we are not even in a post-trauma stage.

=== Political ===
On 12 December 2007, after more than 20 rockets landed in the Sderot area in a single day, including a direct hit to one of the main avenues, Sderot mayor Eli Moyal announced his resignation, citing the government's failure to halt the rocket attacks. Moyal was persuaded to retract his resignation.

On 9 February 2009, Palestinian Authority foreign minister Riad Malki accused Hamas of trying to influence the outcome of the 2009 Israeli general election by keeping up the rocket fire on southern Israel.

== Motives ==
Rationales given by the Palestinian groups responsible for the attacks vary. They include the arguments that the rockets are effective at drawing attention to Palestinian issues, and that they avenge perceived Israeli aggression.

=== Hamas ===
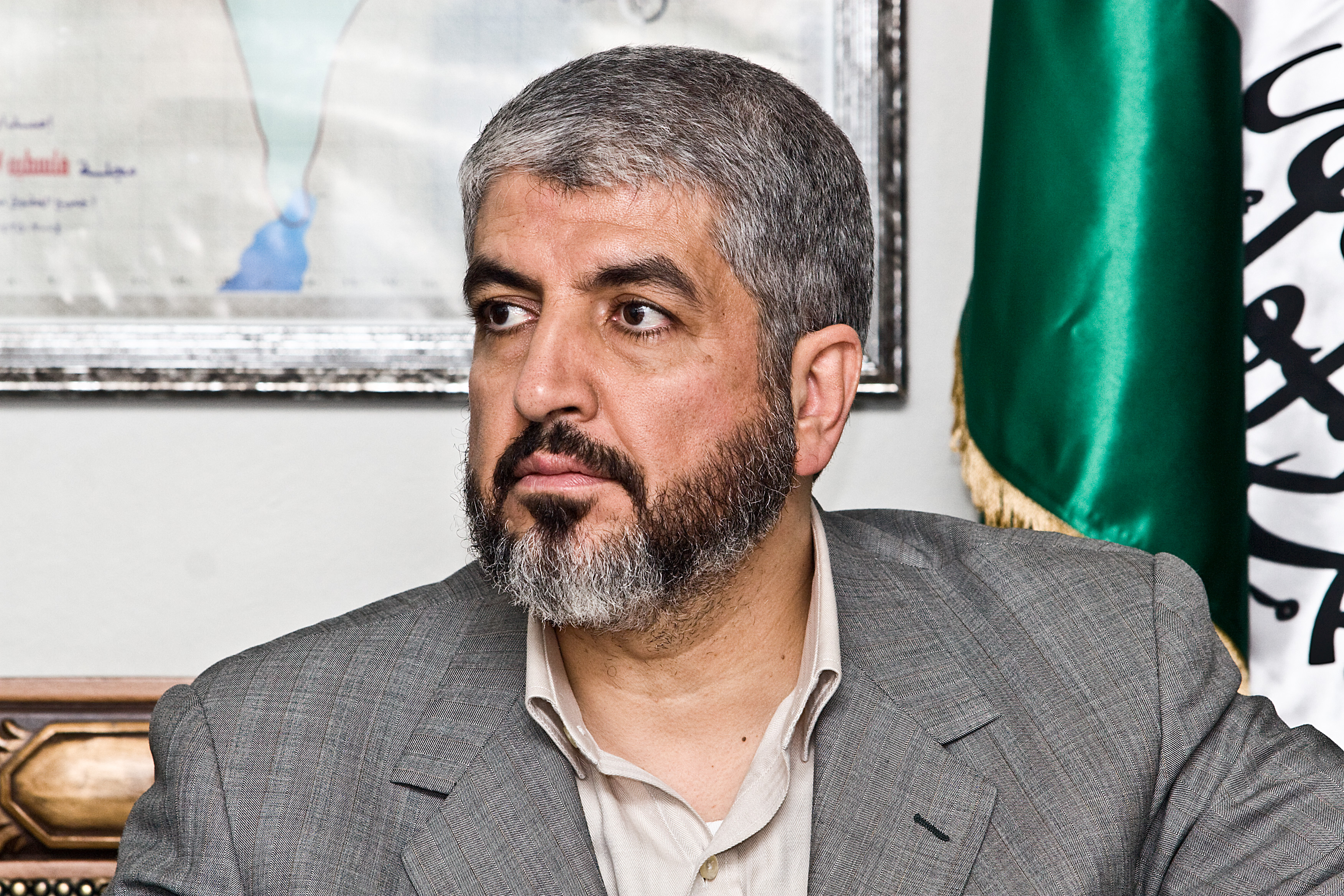
Khaled Mashal, political leader of Hamas

Hamas argues that Israel's blockade of Gaza justified a counter-attack by any means possible.

In January 2009, Khaled Mashal stated his justification for rocket attacks: "Our modest, homemade rockets are our cry of protest to the world."

Two months after the 2014 Gaza war, Mashal elaborated in an interview,

When did we fire those rockets? We fired them when Israel began its aggression and its war on Gaza. That means we did that under the right of self-defense. One last point: when Hamas possesses smart and highly accurate rockets, you'll see that it will only strike military targets.

Hamas co-founder Mahmoud Zahar has said that the goal of the attacks is to force mass migration in Israel and disrupt the daily life of its citizens. Explaining why his group had moved from suicide bombing to rocket attacks, he further argued that rocket attacks are more effective and limit Palestinian losses.

Hamas has given other explanations concerning various attacks. Salah Bardawil, a Palestinian legislator who serves as spokesman for the Hamas faction in parliament, has said "We know we can't achieve military equality, but when a person suffers huge pain he has to respond somehow. This is how we defend ourselves. This is how we tell the world we are here." Regarding specific strikes in 2007, Hamas political chief Khaled Mashal called the attacks self-defense and retaliation against Israeli killings of Hamas supporters. In early November 2008, Hamas spokesman Fawzi Barhoum described the launching of 35 rockets into Israel's southern civilian communities as a "response to Israel's massive breach of the truce", referencing Israel's cross-border raid demolishing the opening of a tunnel and killing six of its fighters, and that "[t]he Israelis began this tension and they must pay an expensive price. They cannot leave us drowning in blood while they sleep soundly in their beds." By mid-November, an attack was said by Hamas officials to be in revenge for the recent deaths of its militants and increased Israeli closing of Gaza crossings. A barrage in December 2008 was described by the group as retaliation for the deaths of three of its fighters in combat with Israeli troops.

=== PFLP ===
A spokesperson from the Popular Front for the Liberation of Palestine (PFLP), on 17 January 2009, called the rockets a "representation of our resistance", stressing that as long as rockets were launched, "our cause is alive".

The rockets are both a practical and a symbolic representation of our resistance to the occupier [Israel]. They are a constant reminder that the occupier is in fact an occupier, and that no matter how they may engage in sieges, massacres, fence us in, deny us the basic human needs of life, we will continue to resist and we will continue to hold fast to our fundamental rights, and we will not allow them to be destroyed. So long as one rocket is launched at the occupier, our people, our resistance and our cause is alive.

This is why they targeted the rockets – the rockets do make the occupier insecure, because every one is a symbol and a physical act of our rejection to their occupation, to their massacres, to their crimes, and to their continuing assaults on our people. Each rocket says that we will not allow their so-called "solutions" that are based on the abrogation and denial of our rights.

The PFLP claimed responsibility for a 3 April 2010 mortar attack on Israel's Shaar Hanegev region, saying that it was carried out "in response to Zionist crimes". The group did not elaborate further.

=== Other groups ===
On 19 January 2009, the al-Aqsa Martyrs Brigades, the military wing of Palestinian President Mahmoud Abbas's Fatah party, published a statement listing its claimed attacks on Israel, including claimed rocket and mortar attacks on Sderot and Ashkelon. The group said the attacks were carried out "to defend our people in the Gaza Strip" and "to defend the Gaza Strip in the face of Zionist arrogance", but did not elaborate further.

The Popular Resistance Committees claimed that a 7 January 2010 mortar barrage was in "revenge" for an Israeli air strike several days earlier that killed two of the group's fighters.

Ansar al-Sunna, a small, al-Qaida-inspired Salafist militant group, claimed responsibility for an 18 March 2010 Qassam rocket attack on Netiv Haasara that killed 33-year-old Thai national Manee Singmueangphon, calling it a response to Israel's "Judaization" of Islamic holy places. The group did not clarify which acts or which Islamic holy places it was referring to. Further obscuring the motivation for the attack, the Aqsa Martyrs Brigades, independently claimed responsibility later.

Majlis Shura al-Mujahidin, a Salafi group in the Gaza Strip, emphasized in explaining its rocket attacks on Sderot in 2012 that "Jihad for the sake of Allah against the criminal Jews is an obligation that we draw closer to Allah whenever we find a way to that, in any place, by what Allah facilitates to us from the reasons of power and repelling".

== Views ==
=== Palestinians ===
==== Public opinion polls ====
Prior to the 2008–2009 Gaza War, polls conducted by the Palestinian Center for Policy and Survey Research (PCPSR) showed consistently high levels of support for the rocket attacks among the Palestinian public.

- September 2004: 75% of Palestinians support "the firing of rockets from Beit Hanoun", though 59% of the residents of Beit Hanoun reject the practice.
- July 2006 Jerusalem Media & Communication Centre poll: 60.4% of Palestinians "support the continuation of firing rockets against Israeli targets as a suitable response within the current political conditions", whereas 36% "reject them and find them harmful to the Palestinian national interests".
- September 2006: 63% of Palestinians agree "that Palestinians should emulate Hizbullah's methods by launching rockets at Israeli cities", and 35% disagree.
- March 2008: 64% of Palestinians support "launching rockets from the Gaza Strip against Israeli towns and cities such as Sderot and Ashkelon", and 33% oppose.

Conversely, polls conducted after the Gaza War indicated weaker support for the attacks and relatively broad support for attempts to prevent them.

- January 2010 Palestinian Center for Public Opinion (PCPO) poll: 62.2% of Palestinians oppose "the re-firing of Al-Qassam rockets from Gaza at Israel" while 29.1% are in favor.
- July 2010 PCPSR poll: 57% of Palestinians support Hamas attempts to prevent rocket launching against Israeli towns and 38% oppose.
- July 2010 Arab World for Research and Development (AWRAD) poll: 68% of Palestinians do not want Hamas to resume its rocket attacks on Israel, while 25.5% believe the attacks should be resumed.
- October 2010 PCPO poll: 49.4% of Palestinians oppose "the re-firing of al-Qassam rockets from Gaza at Israel" while 46.2% are in favor.
- April 2011 JMCC poll: 38.6% of Palestinians say that "the locally-made rockets fired from Gaza Strip towards Israeli regions" "harm... Palestinian goals" and 25.4% say that the rockets "help... Palestinian goals".
- May 2011 PCPO poll: 69.6% of Palestinians oppose the resumption "of launching Al-Qassam missiles from Gaza into Israel" and 29.8% support it.
- November 2011 JMCC poll: 40.8% of Palestinians say that the rockets harm Palestinian goals and 27% say that they help Palestinian goals.
- December 2012 JMCC poll: 9.7% say that "locally-made rockets fired from Gaza strip towards Israeli regions" harm Palestinian goals and 74% say they help them.
- March 2013 JMCC poll: 38% support firing rockets at Israel from the Gaza Strip.

==== Other ====
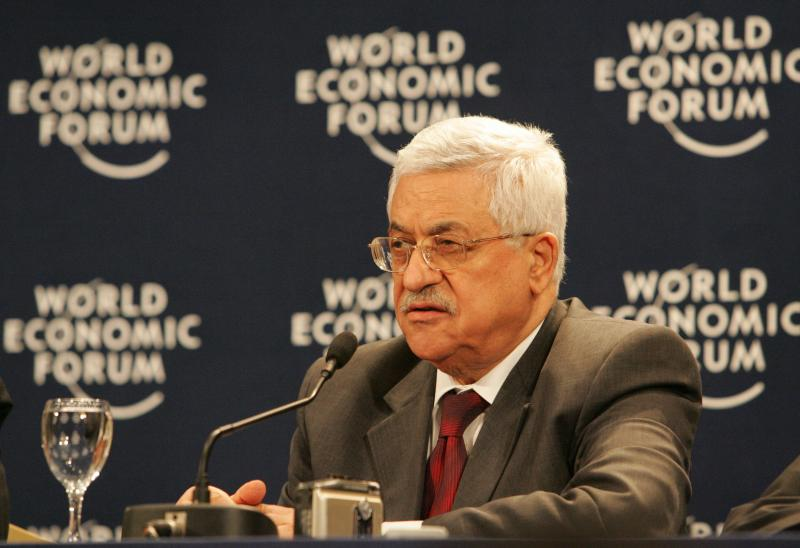
Palestinian President Mahmoud Abbas, of the Fatah party, has condemned the attacks

Palestinian National Authority President Mahmoud Abbas (of Fatah) has condemned the attacks several times, "regardless of who is responsible for them", on one occasion calling them "absurd", and on another saying that "they do not go in the direction of peace". On at least one occasion in 2009, Hamas itself criticized rocket attacks by an unknown group, apparently out of fears that new rocket fire could disrupt reconciliation talks between Hamas and Fatah which were then underway.

The firing of rockets from the Gaza Strip into Israel has been opposed by those living closest to the firing location due to Israeli military responses. On 23 July 2004 a family attempted to physically prevent the Al-Aqsa Martyrs' Brigades from setting up a rocket launcher outside their house. Members of the brigade shot and killed one boy and wounded 3 others.

=== Israel ===
On 27 December 2008, upon the commencement of Operation Cast Lead, Israeli Prime Minister Ehud Olmert said in an address to the nation: "for approximately seven years, hundreds of thousands of Israeli citizens in the south have been suffering from rockets being fired at them. Life in the south under rocket barrages had become unbearable. Israel did everything in its power to fulfill the conditions of the calm in the south and enable normal life for its citizens in the communities adjacent to the Gaza Strip. The quiet that we offered was met with shelling."

In October 2012, Yosef Kuperwasser, the director of Israel's Ministry of Strategic Affairs, said that over 800 rockets had been launched at Israel from Gaza since January 2012, and that organizations such as Islamic Jihad had been taking the lead from Hamas as being the primary perpetrators. Kuperwasser explained that in a worst-case-scenario, Israel could launch a wide operation in Gaza, but said that this would not fully solve the issue, since "there is a wide and deep problem of hate indoctrination that produces more and more terrorists all the time".

Former Brigadier General Gal Hirsch argued that Israel's control over the West Bank prevents the development of rocket threats in that area, in contrast to what happened after Israeli forces withdrew from Gaza and southern Lebanon.

Two Israelis, Aaron Friedman and Yehonatan Tsirolnik, have created an online clock timer, that automatically resets when Palestinian rocket attacks on Israel occur. The time counter on their website uses information from the IDF Home Front Command system and counts time up from the last Palestinian rocket attack on Israel. It displays how long Israel has been rocket free and shows the summed up total numbers of Palestinian rocket attacks on Israel. "Israel has been under non stop rocket attacks for years ... Whenever a rocket is fired, it restarts. Sadly, this counter never really gets above an hour", Friedman said on 18 July 2014 during the 2014 Israel–Gaza conflict.

=== Egypt ===
The 2 August 2010 Rocket attacks on Eilat and Aqaba sparked rage in Egypt at Hamas and Iran. The Egyptian press said the firing of the rockets from Egyptian territory by Hamas or by organizations cooperating with it constituted the crossing of a red line. The Egyptian position is that Iran is employing local proxies, such as Hamas, to escalate violence in the Middle East and to sabotage the Palestinian reconciliation efforts, as well as efforts to renew Palestinian-Israeli peace negotiations.

Later that year, the Egyptian government daily Al-Gumhouriyya slammed Hamas's firing of "primitive" rockets at Israel that, according to the writer, serve only to prompt a deadly response from Israel. He blamed Hamas for turning the Gaza Strip into a big prison isolated from the world, where the residents suffer poverty while the leaders live in luxury.

=== United Nations ===
On 18 January 2009, United Nations Secretary-General Ban Ki-moon said "for the sake of the people of Gaza, I urge in the strongest possible terms Hamas to stop firing rockets." On 20 January, while visiting Sderot, the Secretary General called the rocket attacks "appalling and unacceptable". He added that the projectiles are indiscriminate weapons, and that Hamas attacks are violations of basic humanitarian law. Earlier, in November 2007, Ban had condemned a rocket attack launched from a UN-run Gaza school.

On 17 February 2008, John Holmes, United Nations Under-Secretary-General for Humanitarian Affairs and Emergency Relief Coordinator said while visiting Sderot, "The people of Sderot and the surrounding area have had to live with these unacceptable and indiscriminate rocket attacks for seven years now. There is no doubt about the physical and psychological suffering these attacks are causing. I condemn them utterly and call on those responsible to stop them now without conditions".

Following a 30 July 2010, Palestinian Grad missile attack on the heart of Ashkelon, United Nations Middle East envoy Robert Serry said that indiscriminate rocket fire against civilians was completely unacceptable, and constituted a terrorist attack.

=== United States ===
In July 2008 Democratic presidential candidate Barack Obama said: "If somebody was sending rockets into my house, where my two daughters sleep at night, I'm going to do everything in my power to stop that, and I would expect Israelis to do the same thing." On 28 December 2008, Secretary of State Condoleezza Rice said in a statement: "the United States strongly condemns the repeated rocket and mortar attacks against Israel". On 2 March 2009 Secretary of State Hillary Clinton condemned the attacks.

=== European Union ===
On 7 June 2005, The European Union presidency, held by Luxembourg, condemned the firing of rockets by Palestinians at Gush Katif in the Gaza Strip and against Sderot. In January 2009, European Union Aid Commissioner Louis Michel said that "[l]aunching rockets at civilians is a terrorist action, which has to be strongly denounced."

=== Human rights groups ===
The attacks have been condemned as war crimes, both because they usually target civilians and because the weapons' inaccuracy would disproportionately endanger civilians even if military targets were chosen. Human Rights Watch has also condemned the attackers for firing from near residential structures, thus putting Gazan civilians at unnecessary risk. According to Israeli human rights group B'Tselem,

Palestinian organizations that fire Qassam rockets openly declare that they intend to strike, among other targets, Israeli civilians. Attacks aimed at civilians are immoral and illegal, and the intentional killing of civilians is a grave breach under the Fourth Geneva Convention, a war crime, and cannot be justified, whatever the circumstances. Furthermore, Qassam rockets are themselves illegal, even when aimed at military objects, because the rockets are so imprecise and endanger civilians in the area from which the rockets are fired as well as where they land, thus violating two fundamental principles of the laws of war: distinction and proportionality.

== Attacks from outside the Gaza Strip ==
=== West Bank ===
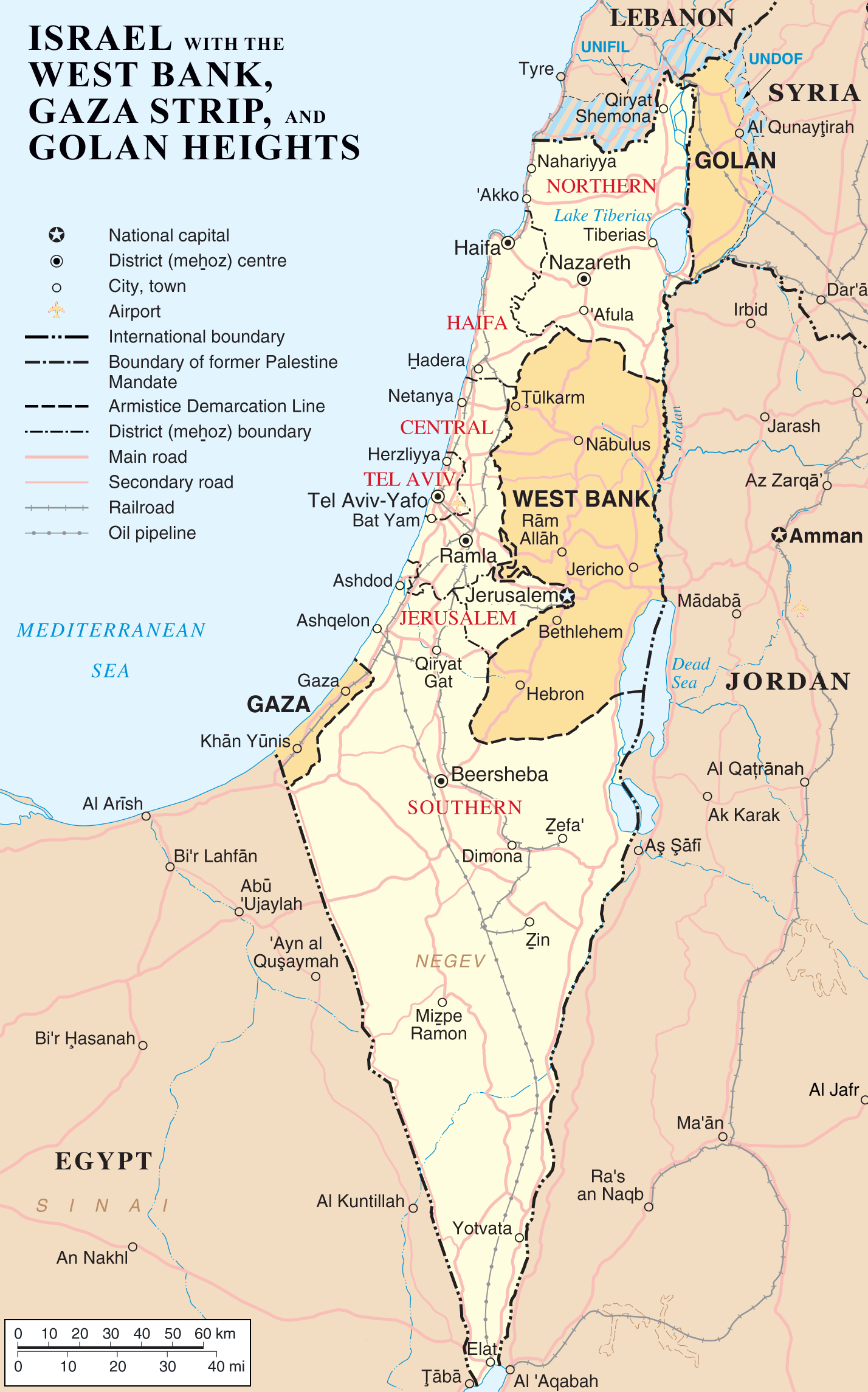
The West Bank abuts Jerusalem and lies within several kilometers of the Tel Aviv metropolitan area and Ben Gurion International Airport.

There have been several attempts by Palestinian groups to fire rockets at Israel from the West Bank, though none of these have been successful. Such an attack could easily strike one of Israel's most densely populated areas.

In December 2005, Palestinian Islamic Jihad and Fatah's al-Aqsa Martyrs' Brigades fired a Qassam rocket at Israel from the West Bank city of Jenin. The rocket landed within the West Bank, in proximity to the Israeli border village of Ram-On. The attack marked the first time a Qassam was fired at Israel from the West Bank and came close to hitting a Jewish community.

In July 2006, a ranking member of Fatah's al-Aqsa Martyrs Brigades in the West Bank said his group had the ability to produce rockets in the northern West Bank and that major Israeli cities as well as Ben Gurion International Airport would eventually become Palestinian rocket targets. "Every day our rockets in Gaza become more accurate and do more killing and this is exactly what will happen in the West Bank", he said.

In November 2006, A West Bank Fatah cell named Jondallah (God's soldiers) threatened to fire rockets at Israeli targets. At a news conference in Nablus, a group of 20 masked militants of the cell brandished four rockets. One of the projectiles, which was 1.5 metres (five feet) in length, was claimed by the group to have "a range of five kilometres (two miles) and a three kilogram payload". "We have a certain number of these rockets and we are going to use them when the time is right," said one of the armed militants.

In February 2010, Palestinian Authority security forces in the West Bank arrested a Hamas cell preparing to test-fire a Qassam rocket near Ramallah and handed the rocket over to Israel. Hamas later said "Having a Qassam rocket in the West Bank is a demand that must be achieved".

On 20 June 2010, senior Hamas official Mahmoud a-Zahar called on Palestinian residents of the West Bank to fire rockets into Israel.

In November 2026, Israel arrested six West Bank Palestinians for trying to build rockets which they intended to launch at Israel.

=== Egypt ===
In 2010, Hamas carried out two rocket attacks on Israel from the Sinai Peninsula in Egypt. On 22 April, three 122 mm Grad rockets were fired from the Sinai Peninsula at the Red Sea resort town of Eilat in the extreme south of Israel. The projectiles landed in the Red Sea and the neighboring town of Aqaba in Jordan, causing some property damage. Again on 2 August, six or seven Iranian-made 122 mm Grad rockets were fired from the Sinai Peninsula at Eilat. The rockets fell in Eilat, Aqaba, Egypt and the Red Sea. A rocket that landed in Aqaba killed a Jordanian civilian and wounded several. The investigation into the attacks involved cooperation between Israel, Egypt, Jordan and the Palestinian Authority. The attacks severely damaged relations between Hamas and Egypt, which viewed them as a challenge to its sovereignty.

=== Lebanon ===
Palestinian militants in Lebanon have launched fatal rocket attacks on towns in northern Israel at least since the 1970s, but these incidents lie outside the scope of this article, as the topic of Palestinian rocket attacks on Israel typically refers to attacks on southern Israel since 2001 and the Second Intifada. Rocket attacks on Israel from Lebanese territory are discussed in the article List of Lebanese rocket attacks on Israel.

== Other ==
Israeli blacksmith Yaron Bob, from the village of Yated, collects Palestinian rockets fired on his area and turns them into roses. These roses have been given by the Sderot Municipality to visiting dignitaries, including United Nations Secretary-General Ban Ki-moon and United States Senator John Kerry. Israel Police spokesman Micky Rosenfeld said, "those rockets are in fact rockets that kill, and it's a nice idea to turn them into flowers."

== See also ==
- Israeli–Palestinian conflict
- Israeli casualties of war
- List of Palestinian suicide attacks
- Palestinian political violence
