= Red Holocaust =

Red Holocaust may refer to:

- Red Holocaust, a 1986 novel that is part of the Deathlands series by Laurence James
- Red Holocaust, a 2009 book by Steven Rosefielde
- a term coined by the Institute of Contemporary History; see Holocaust trivialization § Red Holocaust
  - Der Rote Holocaust und die Deutschen (The Red Holocaust and the Germans), a 1999 book by Horst Möller

== See also ==
- Mass killings under communist regimes
- Communist holocaust (disambiguation)
- Holocaust (disambiguation)
