= Holocaust (disambiguation) =

The Holocaust was the genocide of Jews during World War II.

Holocaust may also refer to:

- Holocaust (sacrifice), a burnt offering
- Romani Holocaust, the genocide of Roma and Sinti people during World War II
- Holocaust (band), a Scottish heavy metal band
- Holocaust (DC Comics), DC Comics character and member of the Blood Syndicate
- Holocaust (Marvel Comics), Marvel Comics character
- Holocaust (miniseries), a 1978 American television miniseries
- "Holocaust", a song by Big Star from the 1978 album Third/Sister Lovers
- "Holocaust", a song by Bathory from the 1988 album Blood Fire Death
- The Holocaust (album), a 2006 album by Blue Sky Black Death and Warcloud

== See also ==
- Red Holocaust (disambiguation)
- Holocausto (disambiguation)
- Names of the Holocaust
- Shoah (disambiguation)
