= Gabi Ashkenazi =

Israeli politician and former military leader

- גבי אשכנזי
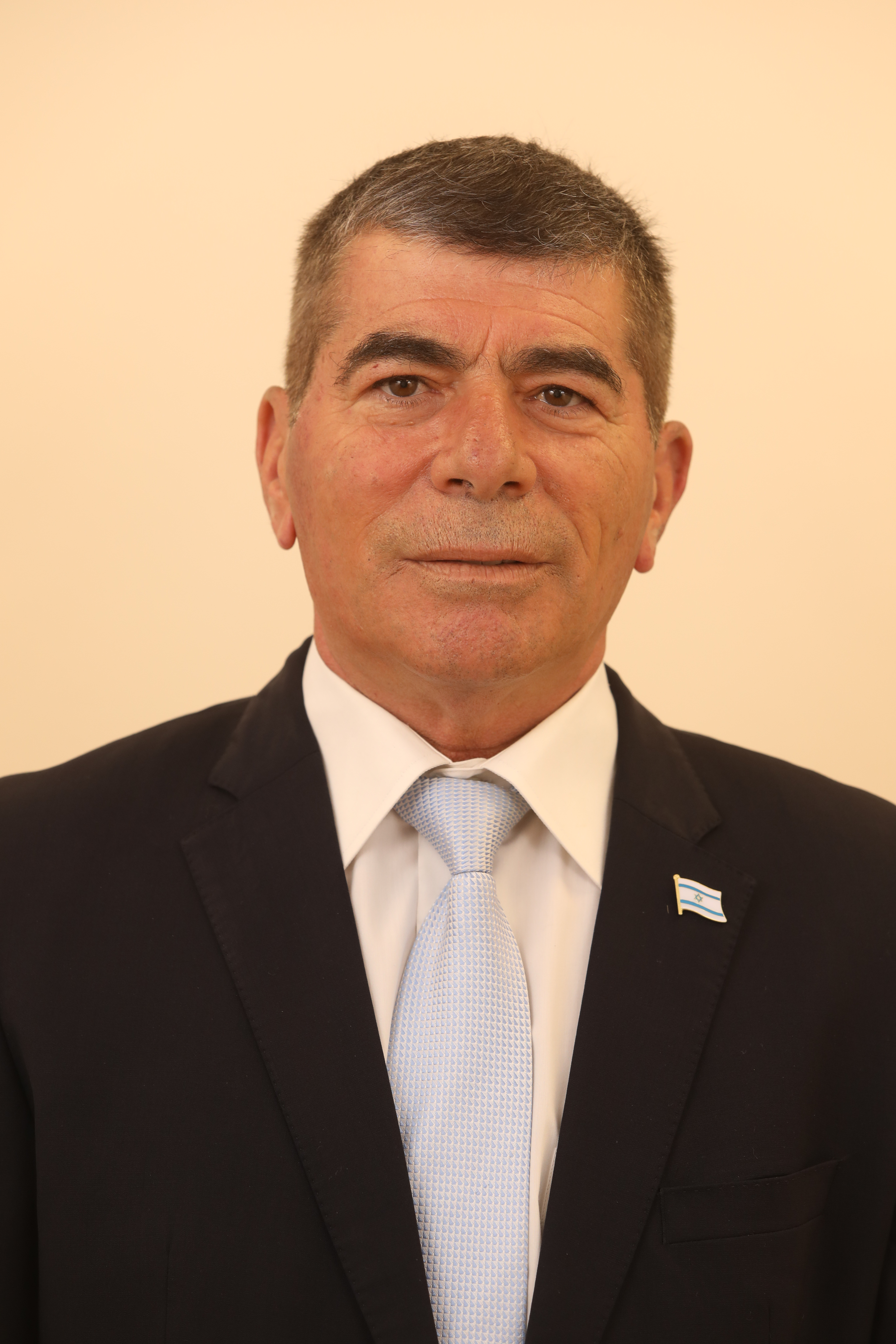

Ministerial roles
- 2020–2021: Minister of Foreign Affairs

Faction represented in the Knesset
- 2019–2021: Blue and White

Personal details
- Born: Gabriel Ashkenazi; 25 February 1954 (age 72) Hagor, Israel

Military service
- Allegiance: Israel
- Years of service: 1972–2011
- Rank: Rav Aluf (highest rank)
- Commands: IDF Chief of Staff; Deputy Chief of Staff of the IDF: Golani Brigade Commanding Officer; Armored Division Commander; Operations Directorate; Northern Command; Deputy Chief of General Staff; Chief of the General Staff
- Battles/wars: Yom Kippur War; Operation Thunderbolt; Operation Litani; 1982 Lebanon War; 2006 Lebanon War; Operation Hot Winter; Operation Cast Lead

Gabriel "Gabi" Ashkenazi (Hebrew: גבי אשכנזי; born 25 February 1954) is an Israeli politician and former military leader. He previously served as the minister of foreign affairs. He was the Chief of General Staff of the Israel Defense Forces from 2007 to 2011. Ashkenazi served as a member of Blue and White in the Knesset.

== Early life ==
Gabriel Ashkenazi was born to a Bulgarian Jewish and Syrian Jewish family and grew up in Hagor, a moshav in the Sharon region of central Israel, of which his parents were among the founders. His father, Yosef Ashkenazi, was a Holocaust survivor who had immigrated to Israel from Plovdiv, Bulgaria, while his mother, Freda Jamal, had immigrated from Aleppo, Syria. Ashkenazi completed high school at a military boarding school affiliated with the prestigious Gymnasia Herzliya in Tel Aviv. His roommates included Yigal Schwartz, a major figure in Israeli literature, and Yoav Kutner, an acclaimed music editor and journalist.

Ashkenazi studied at the Tel Aviv Junior Command Preparatory School and the U.S. Marine Corps University's Command and Staff College. He earned a bachelor's degree in political science from the University of Haifa and in 2004, attended the six/seven-week Advanced Management Program at Harvard Business School.

His brother Tat Aluf Avi Ashkenazi, was appointed head of the National Center for Training on Land (מל"י) in 2009.

== Military career ==
=== Golani Brigade (1972–1988) ===
Ashkenazi was conscripted into the Israel Defense Forces (IDF) in 1972, and served in the Golani Brigade. Ashkenazi first saw action in the Sinai Peninsula during the 1973 Yom Kippur War. In July 1976, Ashkenazi was a platoon commander in the force that carried out Operation Thunderbolt, a mission to rescue hostages held in Uganda, but he did not participate in the battle at Entebbe Airport. Ashkenazi's first of many experiences in Lebanon came in 1978 during Operation Litani. Ashkenazi was wounded in the fighting and left the IDF before being asked to return as a battalion commander two years later. During the 1982 Lebanon War, Ashkenazi served as Deputy Commander of the Golani Brigade and commanded the forces which captured Beaufort Castle, and the towns of Nabatieh and Jabel Baruch. Promoted to Commander of the Golani Brigade in 1987, Ashkenazi was reportedly popular with his brigade's combat soldiers during his nearly two-year tenure in that post.

=== Northern Command (1988–2002) ===
In 1988, Ashkenazi was appointed head of Intelligence for Israeli Northern Command. He commanded a reserve armor division in the early 1990s and later worked as the chief of Israel's civil administration in Lebanon, and in 1994 was promoted to chief of the General Staff's Operations Directorate. In 1998, Ashkenazi was appointed head of the Israeli Northern Command, a position that would make him responsible for Israel's withdrawal from its Security Zone in Southern Lebanon, ending Israel's 18 year presence in the country. Ashkenazi criticized the withdrawal, believing that it should have been accompanied by negotiations with Syria.

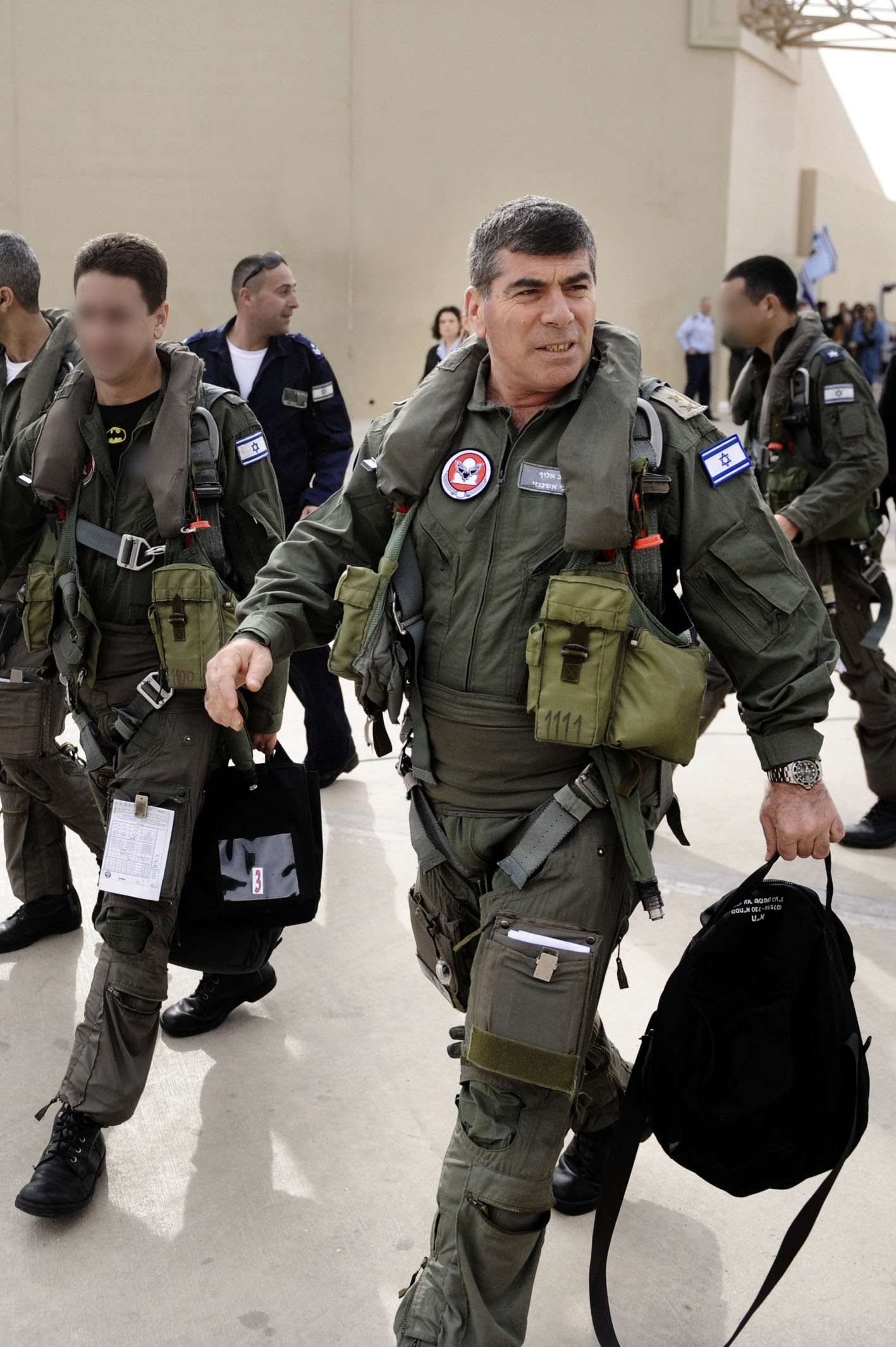
The Chief of the General Staff, Lt. Gen. Gabi Ashkenazi, visits the Air Force as part of his final meeting with all units and branches in the IDF.

=== Deputy Chief of the General Staff (2002–2005) ===
Appointed IDF Deputy Chief of Staff in 2002, Ashkenazi was considered the most moderate member of the Israeli General Staff during the Al-Aqsa Intifada, according to the Israeli newspaper Haaretz. When Israel began to construct a West Bank barrier in order to physically separate Israeli and Palestinian communities with the purpose of preventing terrorist attacks within Israel, Ashkenazi was placed in charge of the project. He advocated building the barrier as close to the Green Line as possible, a position which would minimize the effects of the barrier on Palestinians. The General also "objected to aggressive acts against the Palestinians" during the Intifada and once described his "greatest fear" for the IDF as "the loss of humanity [of Israeli soldiers] because of the ongoing warfare."

In early 2005, Ashkenazi became a leading candidate to replace outgoing chief of staff Moshe Ya'alon. Ultimately, Defense Minister Shaul Mofaz decided to pick Israeli Air Force Commander Dan Halutz as Ya'alon's successor in February 2005. According to Haaretz, "Halutz was seen to have an advantage over Ashkenazi" given his personal ties with Israeli prime minister Ariel Sharon. As a result of the decision, Ashkenazi officially retired from the IDF in May 2005, leaving in "enormous pain and disappointment." He then became a partner in a security consultancy company based in Tel Aviv.

=== Director-General of the Defense Ministry (2006) ===
One year later, Defense Minister Amir Peretz brought Ashkenazi back to the military to serve as the Ministry of Defense's director-general. In this position, Ashkenazi became the relatively inexperienced Minister's "right hand man" during the 2006 Israel-Lebanon conflict and, according to Ynetnews, proved to be "much more proficient" than his boss. Ynetnews attributes Peretz's decision to promote Ashkenazi to chief of staff to the two men's successful working relationship during the Lebanon war.

=== Chief of the General Staff (2007–2011) ===
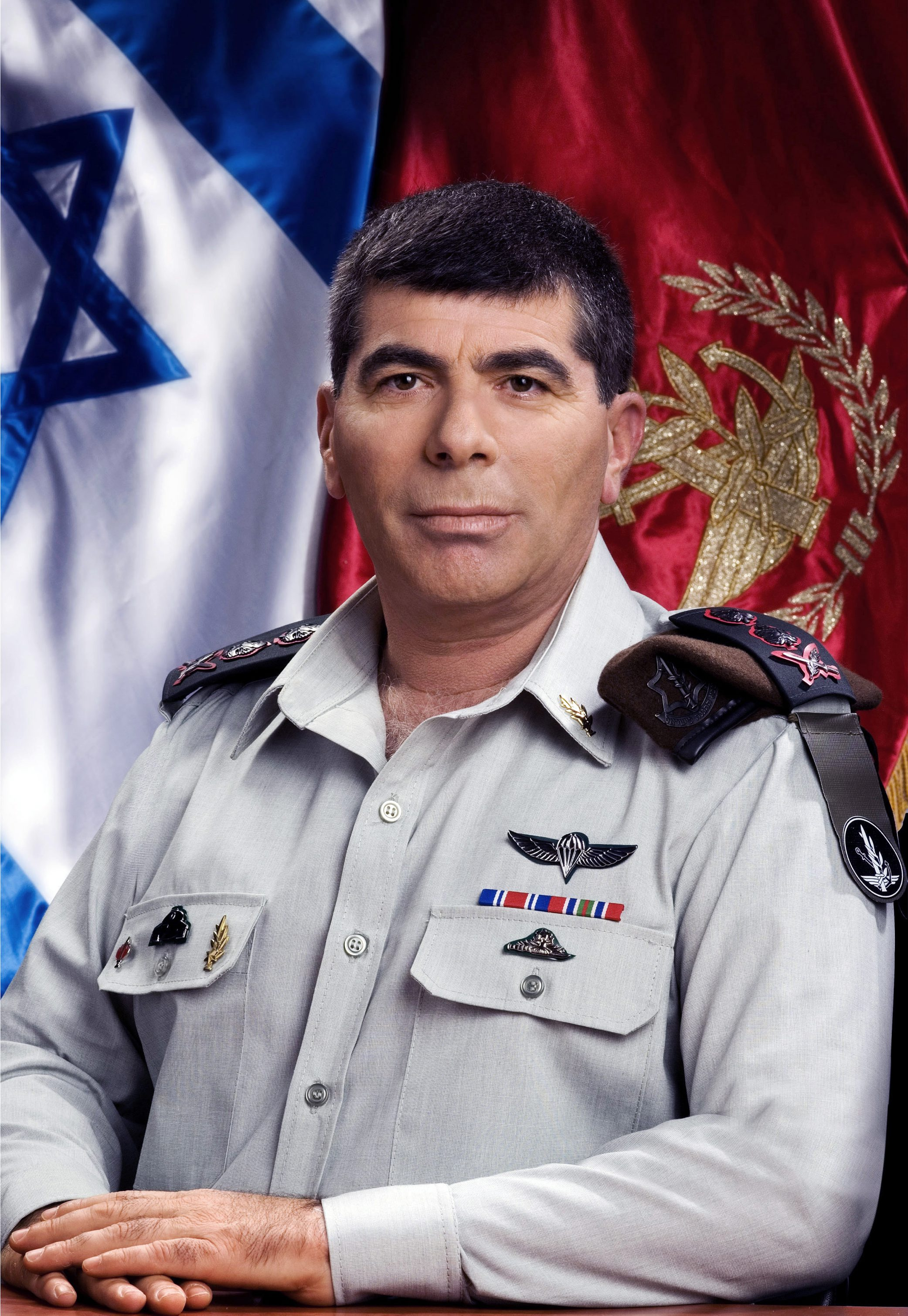
Gabi Ashkenazi in official portrait as Chief of the General Staff, 2007

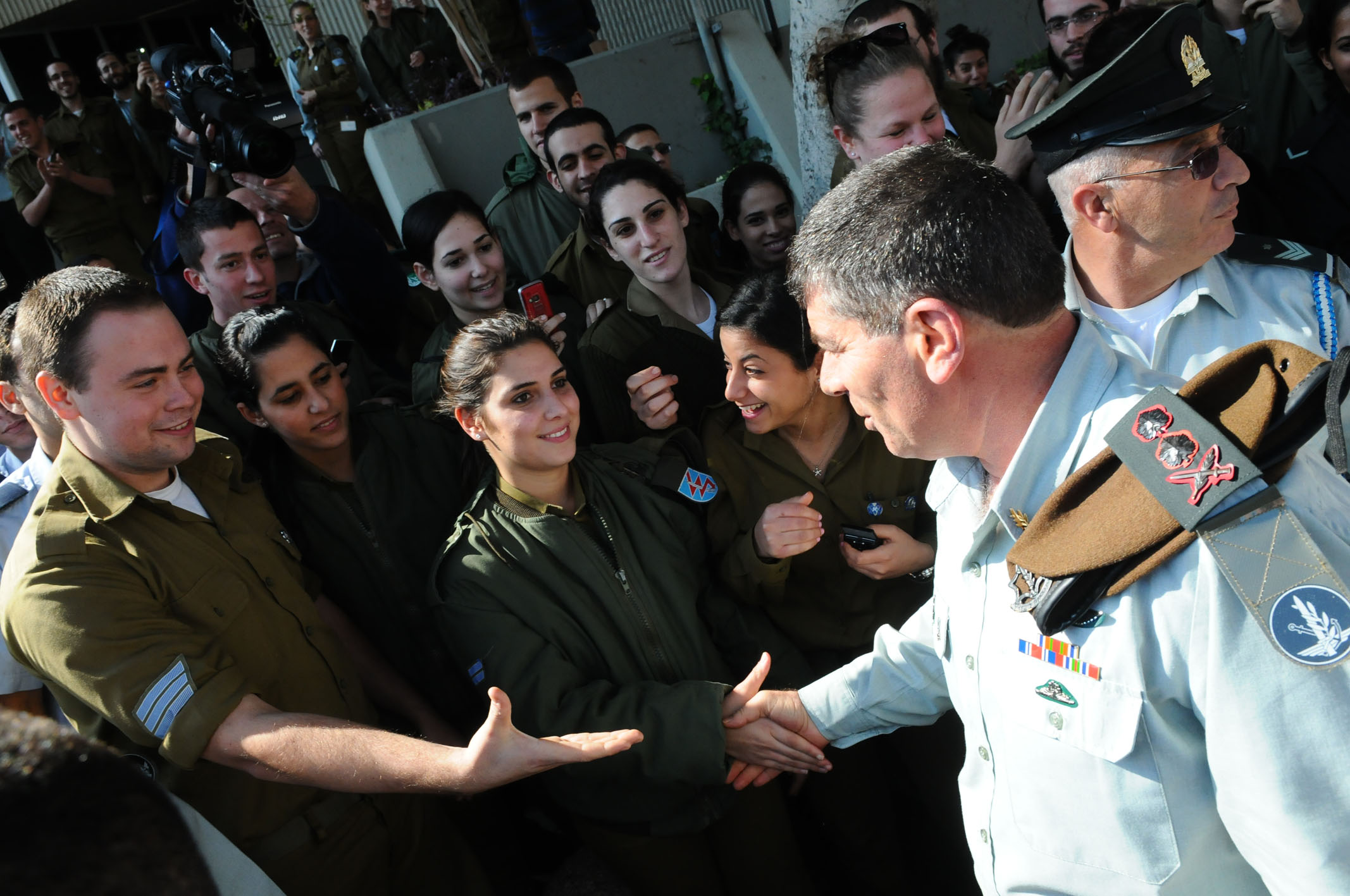
Ashkenazi greets his soldiers for the last time, as he leaves his home base for civilian life.

Ashkenazi became the Chief of the General Staff of the Israel Defense Forces on February 14, 2007.

As a Rav Aluf, Ashkenazi had to deal with the events of the Second Lebanon War and to draw conclusions for improvements. Under his command, the IDF went through a process of fixing its faults and weaknesses which manifested in the Second Lebanon War. Ashkenazi emphasized many intensive military trainings and military exercises, ranging from reinserting basic skills forgotten, up to large multi-corps exercises (which sometimes included full brigades).

In December 2007 Ashkenazi met with Admiral Michael Mullen, chairman of the Joint Chiefs of Staff of the United States – this was the first time in ten years that an Israeli chief of staff met with his U.S. counterpart. While on a visit in the United States in July 2008 Mullen gave Ashkenazi the Legion of Merit military decoration with the Commander rank.

At the end of February 2008, Ashkenazi commanded Operation Hot Winter during which the IDF fought terrorist organizations in Gaza for two days. The fighting ended in a truce agreement between Israel and Hamas. At the end of 2008 and in early 2009 Ashkenazi commanded also Operation Cast Lead during which the IDF fought against Hamas and other Palestinian forces in Gaza.

In February 2011, Ashkenazi retired from the army, and was succeeded by Benny Gantz.

Ashkenazi reportedly pushed back against an Israeli military strike on Iran in 2010. Israeli Channel 10 reported that at a pivotal meeting where Prime Minister Benjamin Netanyahu tried to persuade his cabinet and military to order a strike, Ashkenazi and other security chiefs steadfastly opposed the move. As a result, Netanyahu did not receive the support from his cabinet to order the strike.

In April 2013, he gave his first on-camera interview outside of Israel, and urged the West to provide "lethal assistance" for the opposition forces in the Syrian civil war after it was reported that President Bashar al-Assad's regime has used chemical weapons. ″Maybe a year and a half ago, when we had 10,000 deaths and less foreigners coming from Chechnya or Iraq or whatever and more extremists affiliated with al Qaeda, like Jabhat al-Nusra and others.″ Ashkenazi lamented that more action was not taken in the past as it would, perhaps, have saved lives in the long run of a civil war that has so far cost over 70,000 lives and generated over a million refugees.

== Public positions ==
In November 2011, Ashkenazi was appointed chairman of Shemen Oil and Gas Explorations Ltd., an Israeli company engaged in hydrocarbon exploration.

Ashkenazi served as chairman of the Rashi Foundation from February 2012 to 2021

== Political career ==
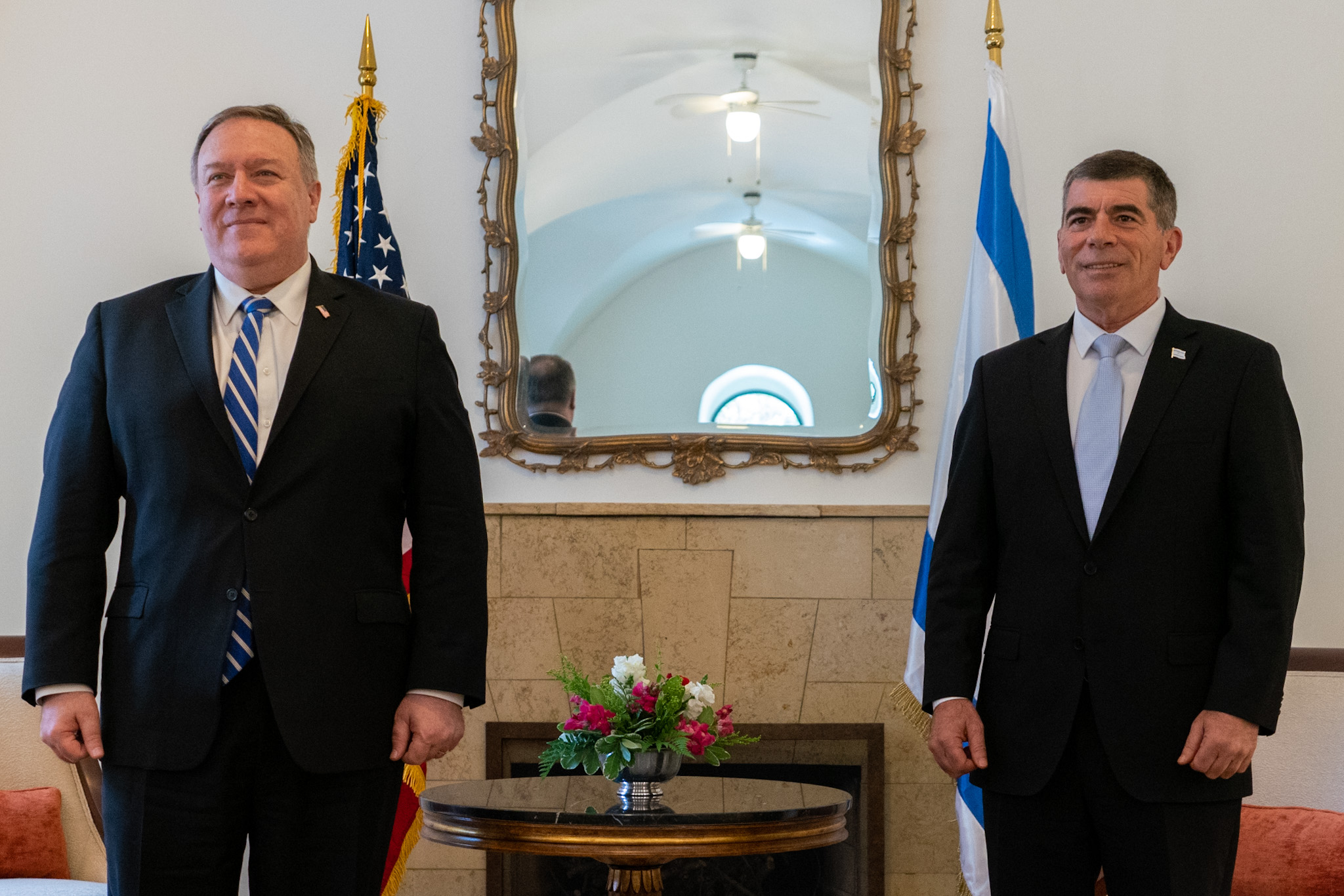
Ashkenazi (right) with US Secretary of State Mike Pompeo in 2020

In February 2019, the Israel Resilience Party, Telem and the Yesh Atid party announced that Ashkenazi would be joining their joint list for the 2019 Knesset election named Blue and White. Ashkenazi was number four on the new list of candidates, as another representative of the Israel Resilience Party.

In 2020, Ashkenazi was appointed minister of foreign affairs as a part of the Thirty-fifth government of Israel. He officially took his oath of office on 17 May 2020. He served in the position until 13 June 2021, when he was replaced by Yair Lapid. He left Blue and White in 2021 and did not run for reelection to the Knesset in the 2021 election.

== Personal life ==
He lives in Kfar Saba with his wife Ronit and their two children, Gali and Itai. Itai played quarterback in the Israeli Football League.

== Awards and recognition ==
In March 2012, the city of Or Yehuda named a street after him. The decision was canceled in 2015.
