= Holocausto =

Holocausto may refer to:

- The Holocaust, in several languages
- Holocausto (band), metal band from Brazil
- Holocausto, the former stage name of Polish musician Adam Darski

== See also ==
- Holocaust (disambiguation)
