= Operation Hot Winter =

2008 military offensive in the Gaza strip

- Part of the Gaza–Israel conflict
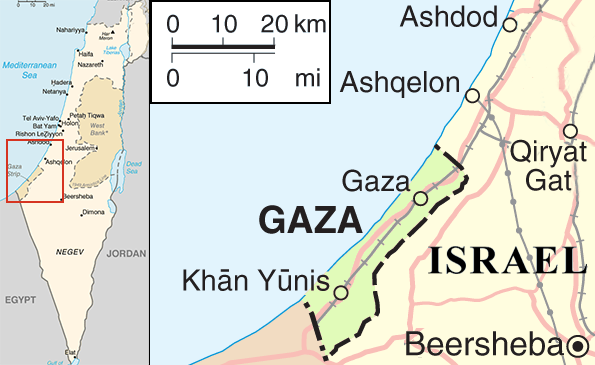
- Area of the conflict
| Date | February 28 – March 3, 2008 (4 days) |
| Location | Gaza; Southern Israel |

Belligerents
| Israel (IDF) | Gaza: Hamas |

Commanders and leaders
| (Israel) Ehud Olmert (Israel) Gabi Ashkenazi (Israel) Yoav Galant (Israel) Eliezer Shkedi (Israel) Dan Halutz | Khaled Mashal; Ismail Haniyeh; Mahmoud al-Zahar; Ahmed Jabari |

Casualties and losses
| 3 killed (1 civilian), 8 wounded | 112 killed (52 civilians), 350 wounded |

In February 2008, the Israel Defense Forces launched Operation Hot Winter (Hebrew: מבצע חורף חם, romanized: Mivtza Horef Ham), also called Operation Warm Winter, in the Gaza Strip, starting on February 29, 2008 in response to Qassam rockets fired from the Strip by Hamas onto Israeli civilians. At least 112 Palestinians, along with three Israelis, were killed, and more than 150 Palestinians and seven Israelis were injured.

There was some international concern over the scale of the operation, with the United States Department of State encouraging Israel to exercise caution to avoid the loss of innocent life, and the United Nations criticising Israel's "disproportionate use of force". The European Union demanded an immediate end to Palestinian rocket attacks on Israel and also Israel's "disproportionate use of force".

== Background ==
After the Gaza–Egypt border breach by Hamas during an Israeli blockade of Gaza, Shin Bet officials concluded the Palestinian militant groups had smuggled large numbers of longer-ranged missiles, such as Katyushas and Grads into the strip.

On February 27, 2008, Hamas, the Popular Resistance Committees and the Palestinian Islamic Jihad fired six Grad missiles at Ashkelon, lightly injuring several people and prompting an Israeli vow to respond.

== Operation ==
According to the Israeli Defence Forces (IDF), the operation was aimed at disrupting militant infrastructure in the Gaza Strip. One of the targets was Hamas prime minister Ismail Haniyeh's office.

Troops from the Givati Brigade, Combat Engineering forces and the Armor Corps are also known to have been involved in the ground operation. The Israeli Air Force was also involved, carrying out airstrikes and providing tactical support for the ground troops. A source in the IDF said that the cooperation between ground and air forces was satisfactory.

From February 29 to March 1, Israel mostly carried out airstrikes at ammo warehouses, rocket factories, rocket warehouses and launching cells, combined with small incursions close to the border. Despite the IAF presence in the whole Gaza Strip and the IDF presence in the border areas, the Palestinian militants managed to fire more than 200 rockets during the operation, most of them at Sderot, but at least 20 at Ashkelon and 1 at Netivot.

After a day in which 50 rockets were fired, IDF decided to change its strategy on March 2 and sent a whole regiment (about 2,000 men) into northern Gaza Strip to occupy Jabalia and Shuja'iyya but met stiff resistance from the Palestinians. Military deaths totalled four Palestinian fighters and two Israeli soldiers.

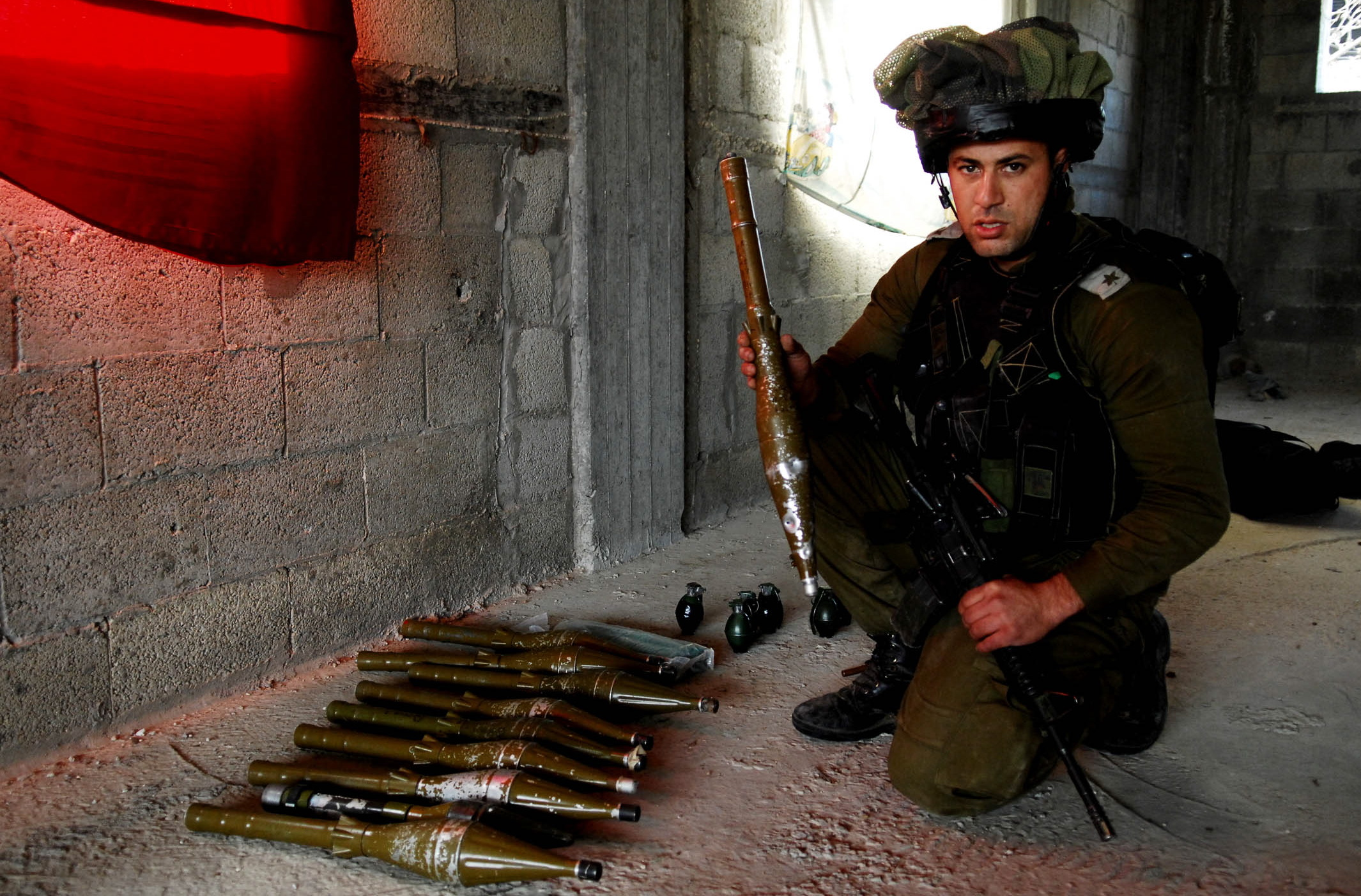
Weapons that the IDF reported were found inside a mosque. The weapons included an explosive device that could be activated by phone, coils for an explosive, a mortar bomb, hand grenades, and cartridges.

On March 3, 2008, Israel, according to the IDF, was free to search for factories, militant infrastructure, Qassam warehouses and rocket launchers in the two towns. In the evening, Israel pulled out its troops from the Gaza Strip, but Israeli Prime Minister Ehud Olmert said the operation ended but Israel would soon return to counter the rocket firing and said the airstrikes "would continue".

== Casualties ==
As of March 4, 2008, 110 Palestinian fatalities had been reported. While Israel claimed that most casualties were militants, Palestinians said more than half of those killed were civilians. March 1 has been noted as "the bloodiest day for Palestinians" since the Second Intifada began in 2000, when almost half the dead were civilians including children. Israeli human rights movement B'Tselem expressed its grave concern at "the large number of children and other uninvolved (Palestinian) civilians among those killed and wounded in the Gaza Strip".

According to B'Tselem, there were 54 civilian casualties. Civilian casualties included children, women and even infants. A 13-year-old Palestinian youth was also killed in the West Bank in the demonstrations staged by West Bank Palestinians in support of Hamas in Gaza. Militant deaths were mostly Hamas members, as well as some Islamic Jihad members, and one member of the PRC. The Associated Press and other news outlets did not report that civilians accounted for the majority of Palestinian casualties, but that they accounted for "dozens". Israel's attacks in Gaza aired prominently on Arab TV news channels.

While expressing regret for civilian casualties, Israeli Defense Minister Ehud Barak blamed "Hamas and those firing rockets at Israel," his office said in a statement, pledging to continue the offensive to protect Israeli towns and cities. The Israeli army said it was targeting rocket squads, and blamed militants for operating in populated areas. Associated Press photos showed rockets being launched from densely populated areas in northern Gaza. On 5 March 2008, Prime Minister Ehud Olmert's office announced that Israel would maintain its pressure on Hamas. Olmert did leave the door open to an unofficial truce with Hamas. "If there is no rocket fire at Israel, there won't be Israeli attacks on Gaza," he told reporters. Israeli government spokesman David Baker said Israel was "compelled to continue to take these defensive measures" to protect more than 200,000 Israelis living under the threat of Palestinian rocket barrages.Militants "hide behind their own civilians, using them as human shields, while actively targeting Israeli population centers," Baker said. "They bear the responsibility for the results." Israeli military spokeswoman Maj. Avital Leibovich called Saturday's action a "pinpoint operation" provoked by the rocket attack on Ashkelon earlier in the week. She blamed the high civilian toll on Hamas' practice of using homes to store and produce projectiles. "We are not targeting homes and we have no intentions of targeting uninvolved civilians," she said. "We will target launchers and Hamas militants, and bunkers." In Washington, National Security Council spokesman Gordon Johndroe expressed regret for loss of civilian life on both sides but put most of the blame on the Palestinians. "There is a clear distinction between terrorist rocket attacks that target civilians and action in self-defense," he said in a statement.

One Israeli 8-year-old had his leg amputated in a rocket attack. One Israeli civilian was killed in a rocket attack in Sderot. Two Israeli soldiers were also killed by Hamas forces during an incursion into the Gaza Strip. Soldiers from the Givati infantry brigade were wounded. A much larger number of civilians were wounded or treated for shock. The rocket attacks caused widespread fear and hardship in Israeli border communities and damaged millions of dollars' worth of property, including schools.

== Reactions ==
=== Involved parties ===
- Israeli Prime Minister Ehud Olmert slammed criticism of Israel for the operation, and stated that Israel had no intention to stop it. He added that critics of Israel were not heard when Israeli civilians were being hurt. Israel has denied that it has committed war crimes.
- (Palestine) Palestinian President Mahmoud Abbas temporarily suspended contacts with Israel, with "Israeli aggression" as the stated reason. Palestinian observer to the United Nations referred to Israeli military actions as "war crimes".
  - A Hamas official declared that Israel had "crossed the line" by attacking Ismail Haniyeh's office building. Mahmoud al-Zahar, a prominent Hamas leader, claimed that Israel lost in Operation Hot Winter, and that these were five black days for Barak and Olmert.

=== International ===
- – UN Secretary-General Ban Ki-moon said "While recognizing Israel's right to defend itself, I condemn the disproportionate and excessive use of force that has killed and injured so many civilians, including children. I call on Israel to cease such attacks." Ban also pointed out that there had been 26 Palestinian rocket attacks against Israel on that Saturday alone. "I condemn Palestinian rocket attacks and call for the immediate cessation of such acts of terrorism," he said.
  - United Nations Human Rights Council, in a resolution sponsored by Pakistan and Muslim countries, condemned Israeli military actions, expressing "shock at the bombardment of civilian homes in Gaza." The resolution also urged all concerned parties, including Palestinian militants, to respect international human rights and humanitarian law and refrain from violence against civilian populations. To some, the resolution is testimony to the argument that the Council has been biased against Israel. Canada and European Union countries found the resolution imbalanced.
  - The UN delegations of the United Kingdom, the United States, and several Western countries rejected a draft resolution circulated by Libya (on behalf of Arab countries) for failing to point out that Israeli military attacks were launched in response to militants firing missiles.
  - In a rare protest by members of the UN's most powerful body against one of their own members, several UN members walked out of a closed meeting of the Security Council after Libya compared the situation in Gaza to Nazi concentration camps in World War II. After the Libyan envoy made the comments, France's ambassador walked out, immediately followed by the United States, United Kingdom, Belgium, and Costa Rica. Dumisani Kumalo, South Africa's UN ambassador and the current council president, then ended the meeting.
- (Europe) – EU president Slovenia condemned both belligerents. Later, in an address to 27 EU leaders, Hans-Gert Poettering declared: "Only last Monday, at its plenary sitting, the European Parliament condemned in the strongest possible terms the appalling murderous attack on a school in Jerusalem and the latest acts of violence perpetrated by Hamas and other Palestinian extremists. The bombardment of Israel from the Gaza Strip must stop. This kind of resistance is terrorism and cannot, therefore, be the subject of negotiations. At the same time, ignoring the population of Gaza and supplying them with only the barest humanitarian necessities cannot be part of a workable, long-term solution."
- Non-Aligned Movement – Non-aligned movement passed a resolution condemning Israeli violence as "aggressive escalation".
- Slovenia – Slovenia, which then held the presidency of the European Union, called Israeli attacks disproportionate and a violation of international law, and condemned the firing of rockets into Israel.
- China – Chinese Foreign Ministry spokesman Qin Gang said his country urged restraint. China also expressed "grave" concern over Palestinian casualties and called for an immediate end to the Israeli operation against the Palestinians.
- Egypt – Egyptian head of intelligence Omar Suleiman put off a trip to Israel because of the latter's "onslaught on the Gaza Strip". Another date for the visit, he said, would depend on "Israel's commitment to international resolutions".
- India – condemned the use of "disproportionate force" by Israel and called for an "immediate end to this cycle of violence." India also began making preparations to ensure the safety of its 21 citizens living in Gaza.
- Italy – The Italian foreign minister asked both sides to stop the violence. He also urged Israel to negotiate with Hamas, in reference to a truce offered by Hamas but refused by Israel.
- Libya – Libya, representing Arab nations at the United Nations Security Council, called for "an immediate cessation of all acts of violence, including military attacks and the firing of rockets, and calls upon all parties to respect [such a] ceasefire." It also objected to the categorization of Palestinian attacks as "terrorism".
- Kuwait – Kuwait called the attacks "senseless" and "unjust".
- Mauritania – Mauritania, one of only three Arab League nations to keep relations with Israel, called on Israel to end the "collective punishment" and the "bloodbath" of Gaza. In the capital, Nouakchott, an estimated 3,000 students marched in protest denouncing "The Massacre of the Israeli Army".
- Pakistan – Pakistan condemned the loss of life as result of Israeli attacks in Gaza, and urged restraint and respect for the right of self-determination of the Palestinians.
- Saudi Arabia – The Saudi Press Agency called upon the international community to stop the "mass killings" that go against international law and humanitarian norms.
- Turkey – Turkish prime minister Recep Tayyip Erdoğan said "the attacks are killing children and civilians and that the attacks can have no humanitarian justification". Turkey also offered to mediate for Middle East peace, but the Erdogan said that Israel had rejected a diplomatic solution. Turkey is Israel's closest ally in the Muslim world.
- United States – The US delegation at the UN described Palestinian attacks on Israel as "acts of terrorism", in line with Mr Ban's statement to the council. The US, meanwhile, rejected a reference to the council's concern that Israel's response is "excessive".
- Al-Qaeda – Osama bin Laden called for a holy war on behalf of the Palestinians and warned of a "severe" reaction against Europe over the republishing of newspaper cartoons seen as insulting Islam's prophet Muhammed. Ayman al-Zawahri released a tape calling on Muslims to "strike the interests of the Jews, the Americans, and all those who participated in the attack on Muslims", and not to limit attacks in Israel, but "everywhere". Al-Zawahri also denounced Arab leaders he accused of supporting Israel - pointing to Egypt, Saudi Arabia and Jordan, suggesting they too could be targets.

=== "Shoah" controversy ===
On 29 February, Israel's deputy defense minister, Matan Vilnai, said, "As the rocket fire grows, and the range increases... they [Palestinians] are bringing upon themselves a greater 'Shoah' because we will use all our strength in every way we deem appropriate..."

The term "shoah" in Hebrew means "disaster"; but Ha-Shoah (The Holocaust) is primarily used in Israel to refer to the Holocaust. As a result, the wire service put out a story "Israel minister warns Palestinians of 'Holocaust'", provoking a controversy. Vilnai's spokesman later insisted that he meant only meant "disaster, ruin or destruction" and not "genocide".

Palestinian president Mahmoud Abbas responded to Vilinai's comments by stating that Israel's attacks were "more than a holocaust", while Hamas leader Khaled Mashal also claimed that they were "the real holocaust".

Vilnai's comments were reported by several news agencies: The Guardian ran it under the headline "Israeli minister warns of Palestinian 'Holocaust'", The Times stated "Israel threatens to unleash 'Holocaust' in Gaza". The Saudi Press Agency compared Israel's actions to "Nazi war crimes".

== See also ==
- Mercaz HaRav massacre
