= Communist holocaust =

Communist holocaust may refer to:

- Double genocide theory
- Holocaust trivialization
- Victims of Nazi Germany § Communists and other leftists
- Holodomor
- Mass killings under communist regimes

== See also ==
- Red Holocaust (disambiguation)
