= Shoah (disambiguation) =

Shoah (שואה) is the Hebrew term for the Holocaust.

Shoah may also refer to:

- Yom HaShoah, Holocaust Remembrance Day in Israel
- Shoah (film), a 1985 documentary about the Holocaust directed by Claude Lanzmann
- Shoah: Four Sisters, a 2017 French documentary film
- USC Shoah Foundation Institute for Visual History and Education, a non-profit organization founded by Steven Spielberg
- Fondation pour la Mémoire de la Shoah, a French organization

== See also ==
- Holocaust (disambiguation)
