= Ramattan =

News agency in Palestine

Ramattan is a Palestinian news agency based in the Gaza Strip and the West Bank. It is among the largest Palestinian news organizations with over 200 employees and has been established for over ten years. In addition to its news syndication, local broadcast activity, and its Arabic-language website, the agency also maintains an English-language website.

The organization's name comes from "Rama", which is Canaanite for "dear" and in turn "Ramattan", which is the dual form of Rama, referring to its dual home in both the West Bank and the Gaza Strip.

Since late 2008 and 2009, Ramattan had been regularly active in providing live broadcast feeds of aspects of the conflict with Israel, sent from the Gaza Strip to worldwide cable-news markets via organizations such as CNN, MSNBC, and others.

In November 2009, Ramattan offices in Gaza and the West Bank were shut down due to what its board described as repeated violations by security agencies of the Palestinian Authority.
