= List of Palestinian rocket attacks on Israel in 2002–2006 =

The following is a partial list of Palestinian rocket and mortar attacks on Israel between 2002 and 2006. These attacks commenced in April 2001, although the first rocket to hit an Israeli city was on 5 March 2002, and the first Israeli fatality was 28 June 2004.

== 2002 ==
17 rockets and 455 mortar shells were fired at Israel in 2002 and there were a total of 10 injuries caused.

February 10, 2002
A Qassam 2 rocket was fired from Gaza into Israel on Sunday, landing in a field six kilometers from the Gaza border near Kibbutz Sa'ad in the Negev Desert. Israel responded with air force attacks and an armored incursion. Seventeen militant prisoners were released from Gaza jail as a result. No deaths were reported.

== 2003 ==
At least 123 rockets and 514 mortars were fired at Israel in 2003. This caused 44 injuries.

== 2004 ==
882 mortar shells and 276 Qassam rockets were fired at Israel in 2004. These caused 8 deaths and 99 were injured.

June 28, 2004
Mordechai Yosepov, 49, and Afik Zahavi, 4, were killed when a Qassam rocket struck near a nursery school in Sderot.

September 24, 2004
Tiferet Tratner, 24, of Neve Dekalim, was killed in her home by a mortar (weapon) attack on the Gush Katif settlement bloc built in Gaza

September 29, 2004
On the eve of the Sukkot holiday two infants were killed by a Qassam rocket (one of three) fired from Gaza into Sderot. About 30 people were wounded in the attack for which Hamas claimed responsibility.

October 28, 2004
Israeli army Sgt. Michael Chizik, 21, of Tiberias, was killed when a mortar shell landed in the settlement of Morag in the Gaza Strip.

== 2005 ==
574 mortar shells and 286 Qassam rockets were fired at Israel in 2005. These caused 6 deaths and 68 were injured.

January 5, 2005
Nissim Arbiv, 26, of Nissanit, was severely injured by a mortar shell in the Erez industrial zone. He died from his injuries ten days later.
January 15, 2005
A Qassam rocket attack on Sderot left Ayala Abukasis, 17, brain dead. Ayala was struck while attempting to shield her 11-year-old brother, who suffered minor injuries. She died on January 21.
February 9, 2005
A barrage of 25 to 50 Qassam rockets and mortar shells hit Neve Dekalim settlement, and another barrage hit at noon. Hamas said it was in retaliation for an attack in which one Palestinian was killed near an Israeli settlement.
June 7, 2005
Two Palestinian workers, Salah Ayash Imran, 57, Muhammed Mahmoud Jaroun, and a foreign worker Bi Shude, 46, were killed, and five other workers were wounded, when a Qassam rocket hit a packing shed in Ganei Tal, in the Gaza Strip. The Islamic Jihad claimed responsibility for the attack.
July 14, 2005
Dana Galkowicz, 22, was killed in a Qassam attack in Kibbutz Netiv Ha'asara, just north of the Gaza Strip. Hamas, Islamic Jihad Movement in Palestine and Fatah all claimed responsibility for the attack. The al-Aqsa Martyrs Brigades said the Gaza rocket fire was in retaliation for the earlier IDF killing of a Palestinian in the northern West Bank.
August 25, 2005
Two Qassam rockets fired out of the Gaza Strip by Palestinian militants landed near the southern Israeli town of Sderot.
September 12, 2005
Several hours after Israel withdraws the last of its troops from the Gaza Strip two Qassam rockets are fired by Palestinian militants from the Gaza Strip. The first lands near the Israeli town of Sderot, while the second lands near Kibbutz Yad Mordechai.
September 24, 2005
Five Israelis were injured when Palestinian militants launched about 30 rockets on Israeli communities from the Gaza Strip. This attack followed an incident the previous day, in which 20 Palestinians, including 16 civilians, were killed when a vehicle carrying Qassam rockets exploded during a Hamas rally in Jabalya. The exact circumstances surrounding the incident are still unknown. To date, no evidence has been found to substantiate Hamas' claim that Israeli interference was responsible for the accident.
December 11, 2005
A rocket fired from Jenin in the West Bank landed near Ram-On. It was the first Palestinian rocket attack from the West Bank.
December 14, 2005
Jitladda Tap-arsa, 20, a female Thai national, was killed by a mortar while working in a greenhouse in the Gush Katif settlement of Ganei Tal.
December 26, 2005
A Qassam rocket landed near a kindergarten during a Hanukkah party at kibbutz Sa'ad.

== 2006 ==
1,247 rockets and 28 mortars were fired at Israel in 2006.

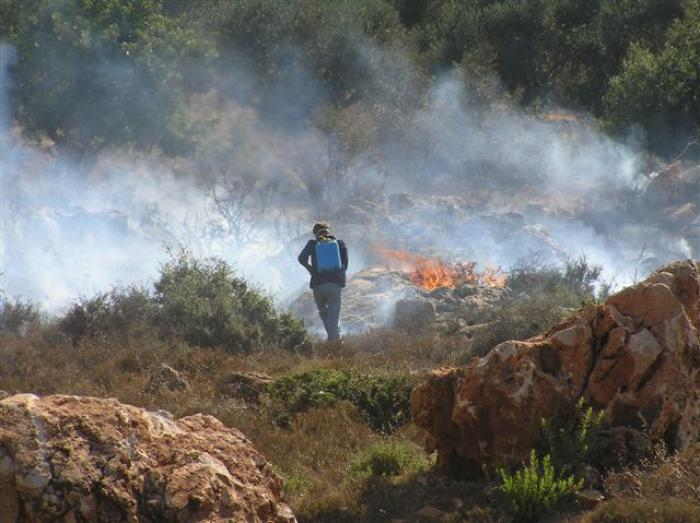
Rocket attack on Mitzpe Hila, 2006

February 3, 2006
A Qassam rocket struck a family's house in the western Negev village of Karmia, moderately injuring four people, including a 7-month-old baby.
March 28, 2006
Islamic Jihad fired a 122 mm Katyusha rocket from the Gaza Strip into Israel. Near the Kibbutz Nachal Oz two Israeli-Arabs (Salam Ziadin and Khalid, 16, a Bedouin father and son) were killed when a dormant Qassam rocket they found in the Nahal Oz area exploded. Larger numbers of Qassam rockets began landing in the Western Negev in March 2006: 49 in March, 64 in April, 46 in May, and over 83 by the end of June. Most of the rocket launches prior to 2006 were carried out by Islamic Jihad but following Hamas's election victory, other groups such as Palestinian Islamic Jihad Movement have been claimed to take over the firings.
March 30, 2006
Two Qassam rockets landed in kibbutz Karmia, south of Ashkelon, one of them in a football field, where children played only hours earlier, and injured one person.
June 8, 2006
Two rockets landed in Sderot and two in nearby Moshav Netiv Ha'asara during Human Rights Watch's visit to the Israeli border area on June 8, 2006.
June 11, 2006
Three people were wounded, one critically when a Qassam landed near the Sapir Academic College near the Negev town of Sderot. 14 Qassams were fired throughout the day.
July 4, 2006
A Qassam rocket hit a High school at the Israeli city Ashkelon. The rocket was launched by Hamas militants from the town of Beit Hanun in the northern Gaza Strip.
July 6, 2006
10 Qassam rockets were launched at Israeli towns from the northern Gaza Strip, inflicting damage but no casualties.
July 7, 2006
Three Israeli civilians were wounded when a Qassam rocket landed in a basketball court in Sderot.
July 9, 2006
An Israeli civilian was moderately wounded as a Qassam rocket struck his private car in Sderot. Another rocket directly hit a house in Sderot, causing severe damage but no casualties.
July 27, 2006
A Qassam rocket landed next to a kindergarten in a community south of Ashkelon at 10:45 a.m. Friday. Two children were lightly wounded and eight more people suffered shock. Additionally, the kindergarten building was damaged.
September 20, 2006
Two teenage Israeli Arab shepherds were moderately wounded by two Qassam rockets fired from Gaza.
November 15, 2006
Twelve rockets in four separate attacks hit Sderot, killing Faina Slutzker, 57, and seriously wounding two others. One of the wounded, Maor Peretz, a security guard, lost both legs in the attack.
November 21, 2006
A Qassam rocket struck a factory and hit 43-year-old Yaakov Yaakobov, fatally wounding him.

=== June–August peak of 2006 Rocket Attacks ===
During 2006, the main concentration of qassam rocket attacks occurred during June, July and early August.

On 25 January Hamas won the Palestinian elections. On 25 March President Abbas endorsed the cabinet consisting largely of Hamas members. The Quartet on the Middle East, which included the US, required Hamas to forsake violence, recognize Israel and respect all previous agreements. When Hamas refused, they imposed the 2006-2007 economic sanctions against the Palestinian National Authority (Hamas-led). Israel placed restrictions on Palestinian's freedom of movement, especially entering and Leaving Gaza. The US and Fatah collaborated on a plan to collapse the Hamas government. Fatah's al-Aqsa Martyrs' Brigades continued to fire rockets into Israel from Gaza, where it refused to obey orders from Hamas government officials. In May and April Hamas leaders repeatedly threatened a new Intifada. Although Israel acknowledged that Hamas was largely sticking to the February 2005 cease-fire, it recommenced assassinations of Hamas leaders with the killing of Jamal Abu Samhadana on 8 June. He was a commander of the Popular Resistance Committees (PRC), and on 23 April had been appointed Director General of the police forces in the Hamas government's Interior Ministry. He was considered a wanted militant by Israel, being suspected of an attack on a US diplomatic convoy, three years previously. The PRC denied involvement in the 2003 attack. Contradictory reasons were given by Israeli sources as to the objective for the strike on the PRC camp, the Israeli military claiming that the strike was an attack on the camp, while an Israeli security source said that it was prompted by Samhadana's presence.

Samhadana was killed along with at least three other PRC members, by four missiles fired by Israeli Apache helicopters, guided by Israeli reconnaissance drones, at a PRC camp in Rafah. Palestinian human rights sources called the killings extrajudicial executions and assassinations. They reported that Israeli media sources stated that Defense Minister Amir Peretz had personally approved the operation. Al Mezan Center for Human Rights condemned the assassinations, particularly the fact that they had been adopted as official Israeli policy. It said that assassinations were war crimes according to international humanitarian law, mainly the Fourth Geneva Convention, which bans all types of extrajudicial capital punishment.

Samhadna's supporters threatened to revenge his death. The next day, in response, Islamic Jihad fired rockets at Israel from Fatah-controlled Gaza, and a few hours later the IDF retaliated in turn with a bombardment of alleged launch sites on a Gaza beach near Beit Lahia. During the time span of the IDF bombardment, a civilian Gaza family, the Ghalias, was all but wiped out in an explosion. On 15 June Hamas offered to reinstate the ceasefire, but Israel refused, requiring Hamas to stop the fire first. This led to more Israeli counter-measures and Hamas, PRC and Army of Islam rocket and other attacks. On 24 June 2006 an IDF commando unit abducted two suspected Hamas members in "the first arrest raid in the territory since Israel pulled out of the area a year ago". The abduction of IDF Corporal Gilad Shalit occurred the next day (25 June 2006). On 28 June Israel launched Operation Summer Rains with the stated objectives of securing the release of Shalit and preventing the launching of Qassam rockets, which had escalated markedly since the 8 June assassination by the IDF. On the night of 29 June Israel detained 64 Hamas officials, including some in the Legislative council. By 27 August the IAF had conducted 247 aerial assaults into Gaza, damaging Gaza's electricity network and killing over 200 Gazans (including 44 children), for the loss of one Israeli life.

=== November 2006 Rocket Fire Peak ===
During November, the second most intense flurry of rocket attacks from Gaza into southern Israel took place.

On 12 October 2006, after a month during which Hamas had refrained from rocket launches but other fractions continued to fire about one rocket per day, the IDF failed in an attempted assassination on a senior Hamas commander. Later on the same day, IAF strikes killed 8 armed Palestinians and wounded 20. In response to the Israeli assassination attempt, Hamas resumed its rocket fire from Gaza, lightly injuring 4 Israelis over the next 2 weeks. In turn Israel responded on 1 November 2006 with Operation Autumn Clouds.

On November 8, the IDF killed or mortally wounded 23 and injured at least 40 Palestinians, all civilians. A volley of tank shells hit a built-up civilian area. Israel apologized and attributed the Beit Hanoun shelling to a technical malfunction. Israel said the shells were fired in response to the firing of qassam rockets, probably from a car, the previous day (7 November). By 8 November, the 240 airstrikes in 8 days, ground clashes and destruction of land and buildings of the IDF's Operation Autumn Clouds, had left 68 Palestinians (at least 50 of them militants) dead, including two Palestinian ambulance workers from the Palestinian Red Crescent Society, and over 150 injured, compared to 1 IDF soldier killed and 1 injured.

== See also ==
- Second Intifada
- Gaza–Israel conflict
- Palestinian factional violence
- Gaza Division
- Israel's unilateral disengagement plan
- Israeli Gaza Strip barrier
- Popular Front for the Liberation of Palestine (PFLP)
