= 2006 Gaza beach explosion =

2006 explosion on a beach in the Gaza Strip

Beit Lahia Beach Explosion
- Date: June 9, 2006
- Time: Between 4:31 and 4:50 p.m.
- Location: Beach near Beit Lahia, Gaza Strip; 31°34′10″N 34°28′11″E
- Cause: Disputed (initially attributed to Israeli artillery; later suggested by the IDF to be a land mine or unexploded artillery shell)
- Deaths: 8 Palestinians
- Injuries: At least 30
- Inquiries: Israeli Defence Forces investigation, Human Rights Watch report
- Footage of the aftermath made Huda Ghaliya a symbol of Palestinian suffering

On June 9, 2006, an explosion on the beach near the Gaza Strip municipality of Beit Lahia killed eight Palestinians. At least thirty others were injured. The aftermath of the incident was captured on video and showed a distressed 11-year-old girl, Huda Ghaliya, reacting to the loss of family members, most of whom were killed in the incident. The footage of Ghaliya, which received considerable media attention, was broadcast on news networks around the world, making her a symbol of Palestinian suffering. The German newspaper Süddeutsche Zeitung questioned the reliability of the video footage.

On 9 June 2006, between 4:31 and 4:50 pm, Israeli artillery and a navy gunboat fired 8 artillery shells at the beach, with two shells landing 200 meters away from the family. The Israeli army and Israeli officials initially took responsibility. A subsequent investigation by the Israeli Defence Forces concluded that the explosion was not caused by the shelling of the beach and blamed it on a Palestinian land mine. This investigation was criticized by Human Rights Watch and The Guardian. The IDF acknowledged a flaw in the report in that it omitted mention of two 76mm naval shells, the IDF maintains had landed too far away to have caused the explosion. At this point, the IDF acknowledged that the cause of the blast may have been an unexploded 155mm artillery shell from an earlier shelling, but suggested it might have been used as an improvised explosive device (IED) by Palestinians. The Human Rights Watch final report published in July 2007 provided a detailed analysis as to why the revised IDF conclusion involving an IED was the least likely of three scenarios. HRW concluded "The availability of significant evidence that the IDF has not examined or taken into account casts serious doubt on its conclusions and underscores the need for an independent investigation of the incident." The Palestinian authorities supported this proposal. The Israeli government declined to take part.

The head of an IDF investigative committee into the beach deaths, Major General Meir Kalifi, reported that the security establishment had received information that Ilham Ghalia said that “Daddy touched something and then there was an explosion”. The IDF viewed her alleged statement as supporting its contention that an IDF shell was not the cause of the deaths. The next day Haaretz reported that the information was of unclear reliability and unsubstantiated. The IDF shelved the claim.

== Precursor events ==
At the time of the beach explosion, the February 2005 ceasefire agreement between Palestinian Authority President Mahmoud Abbas and Israeli Prime Minister Ariel Sharon was still in effect, notwithstanding various violations by both sides.

On June 7, 2005, two Palestinian workers, Salah Ayash Imran, 57, Muhammed Mahmoud Jaroun, and a foreign worker Bi Shude, 46, were killed, and five other workers were wounded, when a Qassam rocket hit a packing shed in Ganei Tal in Israel. The Islamic Jihad took responsibility for the attack.

On June 8, 2006, Israel resumed its policy of the extrajudicial killing of key Hamas leaders, with the IDF assassination of Jamal Abu Samhadana. The policy of targeted killings had ceased with the February 2005 Israeli–PA ceasefire agreement, which Hamas had also pledged to observe. Samhadana had been appointed the Palestinian Interior and National Security Ministry of the PNA's new Hamas-led government on 20 April 2006, a position similar to the ministry's director-general. The Israeli military said Samhadana and the other targeted militants were planning an attack on Israel.

In response to Samhadana's assassination, Palestinians in the Gaza Strip fired two rockets into Israel hours after his death, hitting a building in the southern town of Sderot, but causing no casualties.

On June 9, Israel responded to the rocket fire with a bombardment of launching sites on the beach where the fatalities occurred.

== Victims ==
On the afternoon of 9 June 2006, seven members of the Ghaliya (Ghalya) family—Ali (Isa), 49; Raisa (Ra’issa), 36; Alia, 24; Ilham, 15; Sabrin, 7; Hanadi, 2; and Haytham (Haitham), 8 months—were killed by a blast on the Sudaniya beach near Beit Lahia in northern Gaza. Along with 12 7-year old Huda, survivors included her mother, Hamdia, and an elder sister, Elham.

Three of the wounded sisters and a brother received treatment in an Israeli hospital. Ayham Ghaliya, 21 years old, and Ralia Niham, who was seriously injured in the blast, were treated at the Tel Aviv Sourasky Medical Center in Tel Aviv.

Adham Ghaliya was injured by shrapnel and, after treatment in the Soroka Medical Center in Be'er Sheva, received medical attention in the United States. One other Palestinian civilian was also killed.

== Investigations ==
The Israeli army said it was targeting Qassam rocket launchers, shelling the beach 250 metres away from the blast, ten minutes prior to it. An Israeli military investigation later concluded that the family was not hurt as a result of the Israeli shelling. The Times and Human Rights Watch expressed doubts regarding the IDF investigation, saying that it failed to account for two shells fired from an Israeli naval vessel at the same time as the explosion and called for an independent inquiry into the deaths.

On June 16 it was reported that Marc Garlasco, a senior military analyst and battle damage assessment expert at Human Rights Watch, had examined a piece of shrapnel removed from the abdomen of one of the victims and had concluded that the shrapnel was part of an artillery fuse.

=== Israel Defense Forces ===
An IDF investigation into the deaths concluded, on 13 June 2006, that one piece of shrapnel removed from the body of Amneh Ghaliya did not match the metal signature of Israeli munitions, and that IDF shells or missiles would have left larger craters than found on the site of the incident. The report suggested the blast was probably caused by an explosive device buried in the sand, but did not determine whether it was planted by Palestinians (as the IDF committee head speculated but could not confirm) or was an old IDF explosive.

The IDF explained that six cannon shells were fired in the vicinity. The landing spots of last five were identified as being 250 meters away from the incident, but that of the first was not determined. The army is nevertheless convinced that the first shell, which they say was shot at least eight minutes prior to the fatal blast, could not have fallen on the beach almost half a kilometer away from its intended target. Major General Dan Halutz, IDF Chief of Staff and former Israeli Air Force Commander was reported as saying "We can say, surely, that the IDF is not responsible for the incident," and that, "We checked each and every shell that was fired from the sea, the air and from the artillery on the land and we found out that we can track every one according to a timetable and according to the accuracy of where they hit the ground."

On 17 June, The Times (of London) reported that the Israeli Army had told them its report was flawed, in that it failed to mention two gunboat shells fired at 4:24 pm and 4:55 pm. According to the IDF the two shells landed too far away to have been responsible. A UN radio transmission describing "casualties" in the area at 4:33 pm was identified by the head of the IDF inquiry commission Major General Meir Klifi as related to "an earlier incident" near the abandoned settlement of Dugit.

In a 19 June press release, Marc Garlasco, the senior military analyst at Human Rights Watch, declared the IDF investigation not credible, citing its complete reliance on information gathered by the IDF and exclusion of all evidence gathered by other sources. Garlasco said “An investigation that refuses to look at contradictory evidence can hardly be considered credible. The IDF’s partisan approach highlights the need for an independent, international investigation. [...] If the Israeli allegations of tampered evidence are to be believed, many Palestinians would have to have engaged in a massive and immediate conspiracy to falsify the data. The conspirators – witnesses, victims, medical personnel and bomb disposal staff – would have had to falsify their testimony, amend digital and hand-written records, and dip shrapnel into a victim’s blood. It beggars belief that such a huge conspiracy could be orchestrated so quickly.” The press release also pointed to inconsistencies in the IDF analysis of the shell fragments.

Major General Meir Kalifi, head of an IDF investigative committee into the beach deaths, reported that the security establishment had received information that Ilham Ghalia said that “Daddy touched something and then there was an explosion”. The IDF viewed this as supporting their contention that the Ghalia family had not been hit by an Israeli shell. Other sources list Ilham as one of the immediate fatalities of the explosion. The day after Khalifi's report, in a Hebrew version, the same newspaper recorded: “However, the degree of reliability of the information is unclear. A senior General Staff member yesterday told "Haaretz" that this is unsubstantiated information - and that the army does not have a recording of the girl say(ing) these things.” In 2009 Haaretz reported that “Decision makers in the government and IDF for some reason shelved her admission”.

In response to the call for an independent, international investigation of the incident. IDF Chief of Staff Dan Halutz said there was no possibility of such an investigation.

=== Palestinian bomb squad ===
A spokesperson for the Palestinian Interior Ministry described the Israeli report as "a lie and an attempt to escape moral responsibility for the massacre of a completely innocent family". Colonel Saleh Abu Alozom of the Palestinian bomb squad said multiple fragments from the copper shell casing of an IDF 155mm artillery shell of the type fired towards the area on the day in question had been recovered from the beach.

=== Shrapnel removal ===
The victims had initially been treated by Palestinian doctors who removed almost all shrapnel from the bodies of victims before they arrived at Israeli hospitals for treatment. Representatives of the Tel Aviv Sourasky Medical Center said that Palestinian doctors at al-Shifa Hospital in Gaza, who had treated a woman wounded during the blast, had made unnecessary cuts all over her body in an effort to remove all the surgically reachable shrapnel. The Israeli hospital said they had never before received a patient from which all possible shrapnel had been removed."

=== Human Rights Watch ===
On 30 June, the Human Rights Watch presented a report, concluding that the evidence collected by HRW researchers and independent journalists on the ground in Gaza indicates that the civilians were killed within the time period of the shelling. That evidence included computerized hospital records that showed children injured at the beach were treated by 5:12 pm., and hand-written hospital records that showed they were admitted at 5:05 pm. HRW concludes that in light of the 20-minute round trip drive between the hospital and the beach, this evidence suggests that the blast that caused the family’s death occurred during the time of the IDF shelling.

Marc Garlasco, the senior military analyst and battle damage assessment expert at Human Rights Watch, said that the nature of the injuries was not consistent with the Israeli explanation of an explosion originating from a buried object, and said in his report that shrapnel 10–12 cm in diameter scattered in an area of 90 meters had been found around the explosion sites, some stamped with the number "55" and the word "mm". On 16 June it was reported that he had examined a piece of shrapnel from the abdomen of a Palestinian boy and had concluded that the shrapnel was part of an artillery fuse. According to The Times, "after seeing the details of an Israeli army investigation that closely examined the relevant ballistics and blast patterns, (Garlasco stated) that he had been wrong and that the deaths were probably caused by an unexploded munition in the sand. But this went down badly at Human Rights Watch HQ in New York, and the admission was retracted by an HRW press release the next day."

Following this report, the IDF conceded that the cause of the blast may have been a 155mm shell, which it argued may have been placed on the beach by Palestinians as an IED, or that it may have been an unexploded Israeli shell from an earlier shelling, that was triggered by the IDF barrage further down the beach that afternoon.

In a meeting with IDF investigator Major General Klifi on 19 June 2006, the IDF and Human Rights Watch agreed that it is possible that unexploded ordnance from a 155mm artillery shell fired earlier in the day could have caused the fatal injuries. According to the HRW report, the IDF fired more than 80 155mm shells in the area of the beach on the morning of the incident, and sand would increase the possibility of a fuse malfunction leading to a dud shell that may have sat in the sand waiting to be set off. The report says the shelling between 4:31 pm. and 4:50 pm. could have triggered a dud shell, as could the human traffic on the beach that afternoon.

HRW has repeatedly called for an independent investigation.

== Media reports ==
=== Süddeutsche Zeitung report ===
On 16 June 2006, the German newspaper Süddeutsche Zeitung reported that the Israeli Army had assured that fragmentation found in one of the treated patients could not match any weapon used by the Israeli army. It also questioned the reliability of the video footage following the incident, alleging that one of the dead bodies next to Huda's father is later seen alive and carrying a gun. Citing alleged cases of Palestinian doctoring of video footage, the report suggested that both the footage and the site of the blast may have been manipulated.

=== The Guardian report ===
On 17 June The Guardian published the findings of their own investigation into the incident, casting doubt on Israeli version that army was not to blame. The report included interviews with some of the people that were on the beach that day and concluded with the following statements from Human Rights Watch's Marc Garlasco: "The likelihood that the Ghalia family was killed by an explosive other than one of the shells fired by the Israeli army is remote," and the Israel Defense Forces' Capt Dalal: "We're not trying to cover up anything. We didn't do the investigation to exonerate ourselves. If it was our fire, we'll say it." However, according to The Jerusalem Post, Garlasco reversed his opinion after further examination of the evidence, concluding that the blast was "probably caused by an unexploded munition in the sand".

=== Channel 10 report ===
On 19 June Israel's Channel 10 television's Shlomo Eldar reported that shrapnel from an Israeli shell was discovered in the body of one of the Palestinians wounded in the blast (twelve-year-old Adham Ghaliya). An IDF spokesman responded that "Unfortunately, Channel 10 persists in publicizing falsehoods despite having been given the true facts".

=== Ha'aretz report ===
On 5 January 2009 Ha'aretz's military correspondent Amir Oren reported that Ilham Ghalia, who was treated for her injuries at Israel's Ichilov hospital, said that the explosion was caused by her father's manipulation of unexploded ordnance found on the beach. According to Oren, the admission was shelved by the Israeli government and the IDF. Other sources list Ilham Ghalia as one of the immediate victims of the explosion.

== Reaction ==
Mahmoud Abbas, President of the Palestinian National Authority, initially referred to the event as a "bloody massacre" and demanded international intervention. The Defense Minister of Israel Amir Peretz sent the Palestinian leader a letter of condolence, but Israeli Prime Minister Ehud Olmert rejected any calls for an international investigation into the tragedy, and Ha'aretz have reported current UNSC president Ellen Margrethe Løj refusing to convene the council to discuss the incident unless Palestinian attacks on Israel were also considered, arguing that the blast did not occur in a void and that Israel was responding to terror instigated by others.

Following the conclusion of the Israeli investigation, defense minister Peretz said, "We showed the necessary restraint in light ... of the international uproar that resulted, but it's over." In addition, the IDF have rescinded their temporary halt of shelling and airstrikes in the Gaza strip. Prime Minister Ehud Olmert expressed condolences for the deaths, but did not accept responsibility for the casualties. Israeli Foreign Minister Tzipi Livni agreed and suggested that "There is a situation in which maybe ... this was an explosive that was put on the beach for future attacks on Israel."

== See also ==
- Operation Summer Rains
- November 2006 Beit Hanoun incident
- Israeli–Palestinian conflict
