= 2006 Gaza–Israel conflict =

Israeli military offensive in the Gaza strip

Operation "Summer Rains"
- Part of the Gaza–Israel conflict
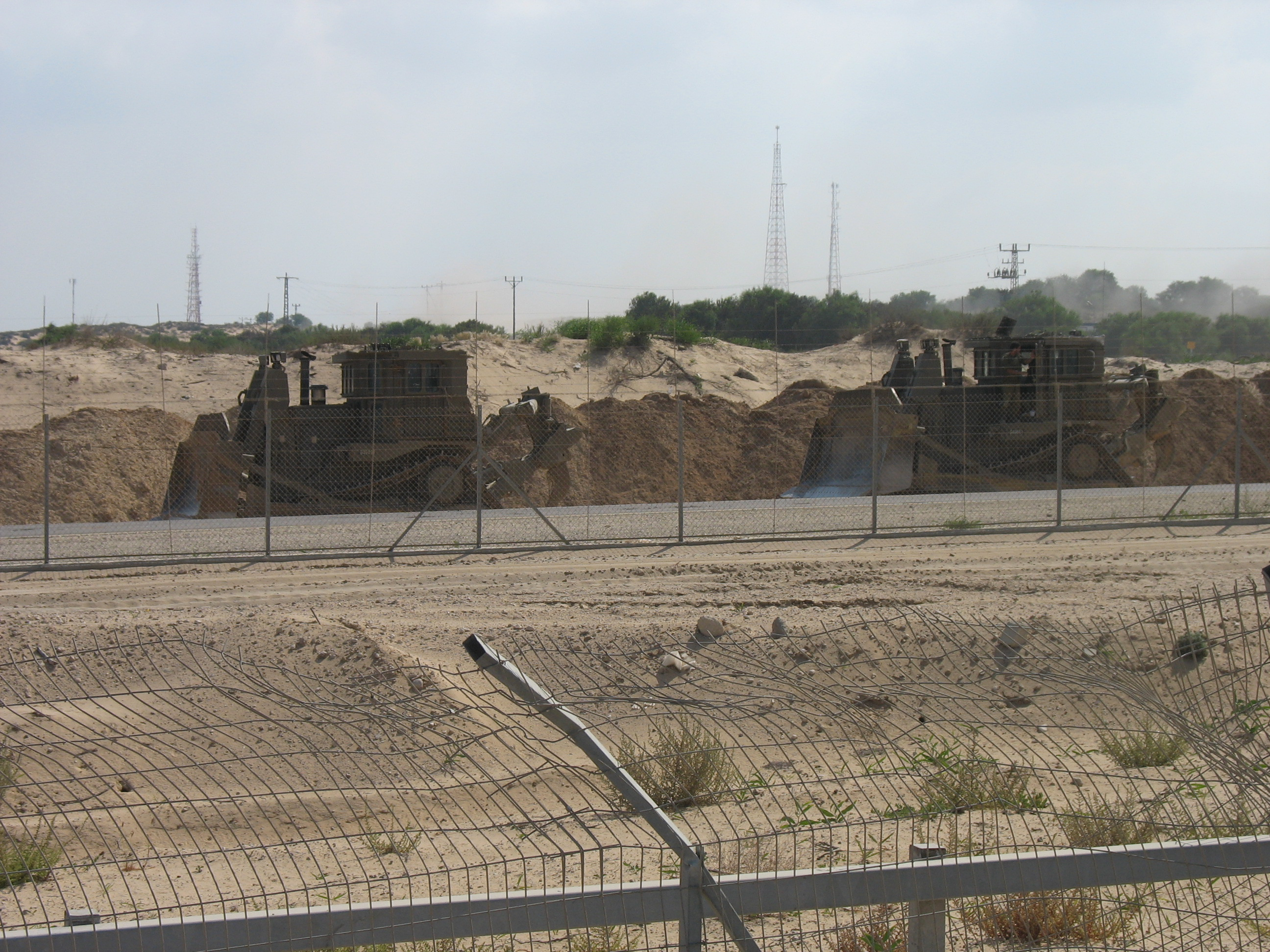
- A pair of IDF Caterpillar D9 bulldozers during operation 'Summer Rains'
Date	June 28, 2006 – November 26, 2006 (4 months, 4 weeks and 1 day)
Location	Gaza Strip; Negev
Result	Israeli military victory: End of Hamas rocketfire into Israel until May 2007 (though continued attacks by other groups); Palestinian Authority forces deploy to stop rocket launches until June 2007.

Belligerents
Israel	Palestine; Fatah; Hamas; (Palestinian Islamic Jihad) Islamic Jihad

Commanders and leaders
D. Halutz, Chief of Staff; Y. Galant, ISC	K. Mashal, Hamas leader; M. Deif, Hamas military leader; (Palestinian Islamic Jihad) R. Shalah

Casualties and losses
11 killed 5 soldiers 6 civilians; 38 soldiers wounded; 1 soldier captured; 44 civilians injured	Figures not confirmed or verified: 402 killed 277 militants 117 civilians 6 policemen 2 Presidential Guards; 65 officials captured; ≈ 1,000 injured
- Timeline of casualties caused during the Israel-Gaza conflict

The 2006 Gaza–Israel conflict, known in Israel as Operation Summer Rains (Hebrew: מבצע גשמי קיץ, romanized: Mivtza Gishmey Kayitz), was a series of battles between Palestinian militants and the Israel Defense Forces (IDF) during summer 2006, prompted by the capture of Israeli soldier Gilad Shalit by Palestinian militants on 25 June 2006. Large-scale conventional warfare occurred in the Gaza Strip, starting on 28 June 2006, which was the first major ground operation in the Gaza Strip since Israel's unilateral disengagement plan was implemented between August and September 2005.

Israel's stated objectives in Operation Summer Rains were to suppress the firing of Qassam rockets from Gaza into the western Negev, and to secure the release of Corporal Gilad Shalit, who had been captured by Palestinian militants. Shalit was captured amid a background of violence between the IDF and Palestinian militant groups since the Israeli withdrawal from Gaza. According to statistics published by the Israeli government, 757 missiles from Gaza hit Israel between the withdrawal and the end of June 2006. The IDF had responded with artillery fire and air raids. During the operation, the pace of both rocket fire and shelling increased dramatically, and the IDF mounted numerous ground incursions into the Gaza Strip targeting militant groups and their infrastructure, including smuggling tunnels in the Philadelphi Corridor. On the first day of the conflict, Israel also bombed the Gaza Power Plant.

Hamas sought the release of a large number of Palestinian prisoners held by Israel in exchange for Shalit. Publicly, Israel categorically rejected any such offers, but in August it was reported that negotiations were held with Egypt acting as mediator. However, the negotiations broke down as Israel was nοt willing to release as many prisoners as Hamas wanted.

Operation Summer Rains was followed by Operation "Autumn Clouds", launched on November 1. When Operation Autumn Clouds ended on 26 November with ceasefire between Hamas and Israel and an Israeli withdrawal, no deal for the release of Shalit had been reached. The ceasefire broke down completely amid escalating conflict between Hamas and Fatah in 2007.

== Background ==
In 2005, Israel's unilateral disengagement plan saw it pulling forces out of Gaza and dismantling Jewish settlements that had been built in the territory in the years of the occupation. Israel remained in control of Gaza's borders, coastline and airspace, with the exception of the southern border which continues to be supervised by Egypt and European Union monitors. Following disengagement in 2005, Qassam rockets continued to be fired out of Gaza into Israel, and the pace of the attacks quickened in 2006 following the victory of the Islamist group Hamas in the Palestinian legislative elections of early 2006. 757 missiles hit Israel between disengagement and the end of June 2006 and Israel responded with artillery fire and airstrikes.

Between the end of March 2006 – when the Hamas government assumed power – and the end of May 2006, Israel fired at least 5,100 artillery shells into the Gaza Strip Qassam launching areas in an attempt to stop them being fired. Hamas had announced a ceasefire in February 2005 and until 10 June 2006, Hamas did not take responsibility itself for the firing of ordnance into Israel, and Israel admitted that Hamas is "largely" sticking to the ceasefire. However, after Israel killed several members of other Palestinian groups (PIJ and Al-Aqsa Martyrs' Brigades) in targeted airstrikes in Gaza, the leader of Hamas said in February 2006 that it wouldn't impede other groups from carrying out "armed resistance" against Israel. This was a significant statement because Israel had often pressured the Palestinian government to stop such attacks in the past, and Palestinian willingness to do so had been seen as a key indicator of intent by Israel. However, Hamas was implicated in rocket attacks and attacks carried out by other groups, as well as engaging in its own attacks, despite the ceasefire.

In late January and early February 2006, there were fears that an internal struggle in the Palestinian territories between Hamas and the previously dominant party, Fatah, will lead to a civil war (Fatah members and supporters predominated in the Palestinian security forces and the civil service and Hamas complained that they were hampering the new government's capability to function). This did not happen at the time, and after a few days marked by at least one shooting, by what appeared to be an attempted assassination of a Fatah official, and by temporary occupation of the legislature building in Gaza by Fatah-affiliated police, both Hamas and Fatah refrained from escalating. Meanwhile, because Hamas refused to recognize Israel's right to exist or reaffirm its commitment to previous agreements between the Palestinian Authority and Israel, the Israeli government and the Quartet (the EU, the UK, the US and Russia) imposed an economic embargo on the Hamas government. Additionally, Israel blocked the Palestinian government's own tax revenue, leaving Palestinian government employees in Gaza (37% of Gaza's workforce) without pay.

March 2006 brought the surprising launch of a Grad-type rocket (different from previous Palestinian homemade rockets) on Israel by PIJ. May 2006 brought protests by government employees in Gaza, who were deprived of salaries (these protests continued in the following months and overlapped with the Fatah-Hamas friction as many protesters were loyal to Fatah). It also brought ambushes on Hamas members, a series of ambushes on Fatah members claimed inexplicably by a branch of Al-Qaeda, and the death of a bystander, a diplomat, during clashes between those security services sent by President Abbas (Fatah) and those loyal to the Hamas government.

- On June 8 Israel resumed its policy of the extrajudicial killing of key Palestinian militant leaders, with the IDF assassination of Jamal Abu Samhadana, founder of the Popular Resistance Committees, which regularly launches home-made rockets into Israel. The Israeli military said Samhadana and the other targeted militants were planning an attack on Israel. The policy of targeted killings had ceased with the February 2005 Israeli-PA ceasefire agreement, which Hamas had also pledged to observe. Samhadana had been appointed to the Palestinian Interior and National Security Ministry of the PA's new Hamas-led government on April 20, 2006, to a position similar to the ministry's director-general, as the head of a newly formed security force.
- In response to Samhadana's assassination, Palestinians in the Gaza Strip fired two rockets into Israel hours after his death, hitting a building in the southern town of Sderot, but causing no casualties.
- On June 9, Israel responded to the rocket fire with a bombardment of launching sites. During this campaign an explosion occurred on a busy Gaza beach, killing eight Palestinian civilians belonging to one family. Following the blast, an internal Israel Defense Forces (IDF) enquiry was initiated. On June 13, Israeli Defence Minister Amir Peretz and Chief of Staff Dan Halutz appeared alongside IDF General Meir Klifi to announce the findings of the enquiry, stating "The chances that artillery fire hit that area at that time are nil." In further interviews, Klifi theorised that the deaths could have been caused by old ordnance or by a Palestinian planted mine. In contrast a Human Rights Watch (HRW) investigation found that "the evidence we have gathered strongly suggests Israeli artillery fire was to blame". According to Mark Garlasco, the head HRW investigator, contentious issues was that the injuries sustained by the Palestinian victims were inconsistent with either a typical mine or an explosion from beneath the sand. Israel acknowledged that it had been shelling 250 m away from the family's location. Palestinians claimed that the explosion was caused by this Israeli shelling.
- On June 10, Hamas formally withdrew from its 16-month ceasefire, and began openly taking responsibility for the ongoing Qassam rocket attacks.
- On June 13, Israel killed 11 Palestinians in a missile strike on a van carrying Palestinian militants and rockets in Gaza. Among those killed were nine civilian bystanders. Reuters called this "the deadliest such attack in four years".
- On June 20, Israel killed 3 Palestinian civilians in a missile strike on a car in Gaza's Jabaliya refugee camp.
- On June 24, Israeli commandos entered the Gaza Strip and captured Osama and Mustafa Muamar, whom Israel claimed were Hamas militants. Hamas claimed that they were the sons of a Hamas supporter but not Hamas members themselves. It was Israel's first raid into the Strip since its forces pulled out of Gaza in September 2005.
- On June 25, armed Palestinians crossed the border from the Gaza Strip into Israel via a makeshift tunnel and attacked an IDF post. During the morning attack, two Palestinian militants and two IDF soldiers were killed and four others wounded. The Palestinians captured Corporal Gilad Shalit, who suffered a broken left hand and a light shoulder wound. Hamas claimed that the attack was carried out in response to June 9 killings, but the IDF concluded that the digging of the tunnel must have taken between 3 and 6 months.
- On June 26, Shalit's captors issued a series of statements demanding the release of all female Palestinian prisoners and all Palestinian prisoners under the age of 18. The statements came from Izz ad-Din al-Qassam Brigades (the military wing of Palestinian governing party Hamas), the Popular Resistance Committees (which includes members of Fatah, Islamic Jihad and Hamas), and the Army of Islam. More than 8,000 Palestinians were being held as prisoners by Israel. Approximately two-thirds of these prisoners were convicted in court, while around ten percent were held without charge.
- On June 29, the IDF issued a summary of activity in the Gaza Strip:

Early this morning, July 29, 2006, the IDF began engineering work in the Erez industrial area in the northern Gaza Strip in order to thwart terror threats and to discover tunnels and explosive devices in area.

In addition, the IDF carried out aerial attacks against a structure used by Hamas to store and manufacture weaponry in Gaza City, as well as a tunnel located along the Israeli-Egyptian border near Rafah in the southern Gaza Strip.

Prior to the attacks on these targets, in order to ensure the safety of the residents of the Gaza Strip, the IDF warned the population not to stay in structures that are used by terrorist organizations for storing weapons.

Terrorist organizations operate from within civilian population, while cynically exploiting uninvolved civilians and using them as human shields, exploiting their homes to store weapons and launch rockets at Israeli towns from populated areas.

The IDF will continue to act with determination against terrorist organizations and terror infrastructure in order to create the conditions for the return of Corporal Gilad Shalit and to stop terror attacks and the launching of missiles against Israel.

== Timeline ==
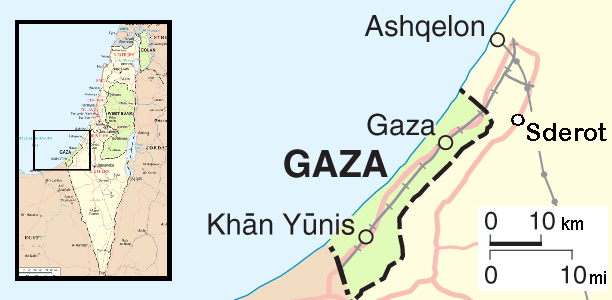
Map of the conflict area

=== Naval closure ===
On June 26, the Israeli Navy imposed a naval closure of the Gaza Strip with Squadron 916 imposing a blockade, to prevent Shalit being smuggled out by sea. The navy increased patrols of naval vessels along the Gaza coastline, and prepared for an attempt to smuggle Shalit out by boat, sending instructions to captains. Palestinian fast boats were banned from operating in the area, and only small Palestinian fishing boats were allowed on the sea.

=== IDF enters Southern Gaza ===
Israeli forces entered Khan Yunis on June 28, 2006, in search for Shalit. Four Israeli F-16s flew over the Latakia residence of Bashar al-Assad, President of Syria, in a symbolic move linked by the IDF spokesperson to Israel's view of the Syrian leadership as a sponsor of terrorism, and the presence in Syria of Hamas leader Khaled Mashal. In preparation for the Israeli operation, the government of Egypt announced it deployed 2,500 policemen to the Egypt-Gaza Strip border to prevent the possible transfer of Shalit into Egypt, as well as to prevent an influx of refugees out of the Strip.

In the early hours of the operation, several Palestinian civilian locations were targeted. Bridges were destroyed that effectively cut the Gaza Strip in half. Power was also cut to 65% of the Gaza Strip after Israeli planes fired at least nine missiles at Gaza's only power station. Israeli forces also occupied the Gaza International Airport. Airstrikes were carried out on Hamas training and munitions camps, though no casualties were reported.

In apparent response, the Popular Resistance Committees announced they had abducted an 18-year-old man from the West Bank settlement of Itamar, Eliyahu Asheri, and would kill him if the invasion continued. On June 29, IDF combat engineers and Shabak agents, acting on intelligence, found Asheri's body in an abandoned car in an open field outside of Ramallah. The youth appeared to have been shot to death, and findings indicated that he may have been killed as early as Sunday, casting doubt on the PRC's earlier claims that he was alive and kept in captivity.

Although the PRC said it was behind the attack, it became known that the capture was planned and carried out by Fatah militants. Four Palestinians were captured by IDF forces for killing Asheri, all al-Aqsa Martyrs' Brigades activists and Palestinian Preventive Security force members.

The al-Aqsa Martyrs' Brigades later announced that they had captured a third Israeli, Noach Moskovich from the central Israeli city of Rishon LeZion. However Moskovich was eventually discovered dead, apparently of natural causes, near the spot where he had last been seen. The Brigades also threatened that, should there be any Palestinian civilian casualties as a result of the incursion, they would attack Israel's overseas embassies. As night fell, the Israel Defense Forces began shelling locations in Gaza with artillery, and hit two weapons warehouses.

=== Incursion into Northern Gaza ===
As night approached June 28, IDF troops and tanks massed on the northern border of Gaza Strip, and prepared to take strategic positions in the second phase of the operation, which Israel claimed targeted Qassam rocket sites. Qassam rockets were continually fired into Israel, and during the early hours of June 29, several Israeli naval vessels shelled Qassam locations. Thousands of leaflets advising civilians to leave their homes were dropped on inhabited areas in the northern Gaza Strip towns of Beit Lahia and Beit Hanoun which Israel had identified as frequent launch sites for Qassam rockets.

An explosion was reported in Gaza City, and eyewitnesses reported it was at the Islamic University. The university is believed to be a pro-Hamas institute. Witnesses reported Israeli tanks, soldiers, and bulldozers entering Northern Gaza. Following a plea from Egypt for more time for negotiations however, the IDF later announced it would put a hold on the second phase to give the militants a final chance to turn over Shalit.

=== Arrest of Hamas government members ===
On June 29, Israel arrested 64 Hamas officials. Amongst them were Palestinian Authority cabinet ministers and members of the Palestinian Legislative Council. Eight Hamas government members (five of whom in Ramallah) and up to twenty Legislative Council representatives were detained in the operation.

Among those arrested are the Finance Minister Omar Abd al-Razaq; Labour Minister Mohammad Barghouti; Religious Affairs Minister Nayef Rajoub, brother of former West Bank strongman Jibril Rajoub of the rival Fatah party; East Jerusalem legislative council member and number two on Hamas list, Muhammad Abu Tir; as well as heads of regional councils, and the mayors and two municipal council members of Nablus, Beita and Qalqilya and the latter's deputy mayor. At least a third of the Hamas cabinet have been detained and held by Israel. As a result, many Hamas officials have gone into hiding.

The IDF stated that the arrested Hamas ministers "are not bargaining chips for the return of the soldier – it was simply an operation against a terrorist organization". Israeli Minister of National Infrastructure, Benjamin Ben-Eliezer, hinted that the Prime Minister of the Palestinian National Authority, Ismail Haniyeh, is not immune from being arrested or attacked by the Security Forces. The Israeli army and government officials said, the arrested Hamas officials will be questioned and eventually indicted. "Their arrests were not arbitrary. They will be put to trial, and they will be able to defend themselves in accordance with a legal system which is internationally recognized," Israeli Deputy Prime Minister Shimon Peres said, explaining the arrest of Hamas members.

The operation to arrest these Hamas ministers was reportedly planned several weeks before and was met then with the approval of Israel's Attorney General, Menachem Mazuz. On June 28, Shabak Director Yuval Diskin brought a list of names to the approval of Israel's Prime Minister, Ehud Olmert. Mazuz decided that those arrested will be prosecuted for the criminal offences of failing to prevent acts of terror and membership of a terrorist organization (which carry a maximum sentence of twenty years) and tried by military judges before an open military tribunal, as would be the case for any other Gaza or West Bank resident.

August 6, Israeli forces detained the Speaker of the Palestinian Legislative Council, Aziz Dweik, at his home in the West Bank. Dweik, who is regarded as a key member of Hamas, was apprehended after Israeli military-vehicles surrounded his home in Ramallah.

=== Bombardment phase ===
Beginning on June 30, the IDF began to hit the Gaza Strip with a variety of targeted bombardments. Israeli warplanes struck more than a dozen times in Gaza in the hours after midnight, hitting a Fatah office and a Hamas facility in Gaza City as well as roads and open fields.

Israeli Air Force aircraft struck the Palestinian Interior Ministry in Gaza City. The Israel Defense Forces confirmed its planes hit the office of Interior Minister Said Seyam, which it called "a meeting place to plan and direct terror activity". Shortly after, several militants approached an IDF position in Southern Gaza carrying anti-tank weaponry. The Israeli forces opened fire, wounding two militants, and causing them to leave their position.

In a separate Israeli airstrike, three missiles hit the office of Khaled Abu Ilal, an Interior Ministry official, who also heads a pro-Hamas militia.

After Israeli warnings that the Palestinian Prime Minister Ismail Haniyeh could be targeted for assassination if Corporal Shalit was not freed, Israeli aircraft hit the Prime Minister's office with two missiles in the early hours of July 2.

On July 12, the IDF dropped a 550 lb bomb on a building in Gaza City, killing a family of nine. A spokesman for the Israeli army said they were trying to kill a group of Hamas militants led by Mohammed Deif, and did not know that a family was living inside the house when they bombed it.

=== High-trajectory fire into Israel ===
On July 4, high-trajectory fire by Palestinian militants into Israel reached a milestone when an improved Qassam rocket succeeded in reaching central Ashkelon, the first Palestinian-made rocket to do so, hitting an empty school yard, and causing light damage and no injuries.

The next day, two more Qassam rockets hit a neighborhood in southern Ashkelon, wounding eight civilians. The IDF was given the go-ahead to move into Northern Gaza with a large force, with the stated aim of attempting to push the militants farther into Gaza, and out of range from Ashkelon and other coastal towns.

Qassams also struck near Netivot (which is 12 km east of Northern Gaza), Sa'ad, Kibbutz Kfar Aza, as well as smaller towns and kibbutzim in the Negev.

=== Ongoing responses ===
On July 5, 2006, the Israeli Security Cabinet called for prolonged and gradual military action in Gaza. A communique issued after the meeting said that in light of the capture of Cpl. Gilad Shalit and the continuation of the rocket fire on Israel, "preparations will be made to bring about a change in the rules of the game and mode of operating with the Palestinian Authority and Hamas."

Later that day IDF soldiers apprehended a Palestinian wearing an explosives belt, who entered the industrial zone in the West Bank town of Barkan, near the Jewish settlement of Ariel, in a Palestinian taxi which the IDF said was destined for a major Israeli city.

=== Ground operation in northern Gaza Strip ===
On July 6, 2006, the IDF's Golani Brigade under the command of Colonel Tamir Yadai, backed by IAF jets and artillery fire, reoccupied the site of three former Israeli settlements of Dugit, Nisanit and Elei Sinai in the northern Gaza Strip. Additional forces entered the nearby Palestinian town of Beit Lahiya. A Beit Lahiya resident was quoted in Yedioth Ahronoth as saying, "It's a crazy scene – everyone is shooting at everyone," and "Soldiers are coming out of the trees, from the rooftops. The residents don't know if they should leave their homes or hide." Israeli tanks and helicopter gunships entered Beit Lahiya firing at militant positions. Palestinian militants responded with automatic weapons fire.

=== November 2006 Israeli operation in Beit Hanoun ===
Operation "Summer Rains" was completed by Operation "Autumn Clouds", launched on November 1. When "Autumn Clouds" ended on November 26, with an Israeli withdrawal and ceasefire between Hamas and Israel, no deal for the release of Shalit had been reached. The ceasefire was only shakily observed, with rockets hitting Israel at an average rate of just over forty five per month before the next major flare-up of violence in May 2007, according to the Israeli government. During this intervening period Hamas did not itself take responsibility for rocket fire into Israel, and Israel refrained from firing tank or artillery shells into the Gaza Strip. The ceasefire broke down completely amid escalating conflict between Hamas and Fatah.

== Impact on Gaza Strip residents ==
Palestinian officials say that it could take six months and some $15 million to repair the damage done to the destroyed power plant.

According to the Palestinian Environmental NGOs Network, "The public health and safety and environmental hazards stemming from the damage caused to infrastructure as a result of this military operation include water shortages, contaminated remaining drinking water, uncontrolled discharge and untreated sewage flowing in the streets resulting in groundwater pollution, pollution of agricultural land which Gazans will now be unable to cultivate to harvest crops, negatively impacting their earning."

The Israeli army was accused of using Palestinian civilians as human shields in an operation in northern Gaza. According to the Israeli human rights group, B'tselem, six civilians including two minors were subjected to the illegal tactic during an incursion into the town of Beit Hanoun.

On June 29 the IDF made the following announcement to Gaza residents, distributed through pamphlets and broadcast through other means:

To the civilians of the area: The IDF extends its operations to all areas of the Gaza Strip, and therefore conducts military activities in your area, for the time period that is required. The operations will be launched in order to locate the site in which the captured soldier, Gilad Shalit, is being held, to rescue him, and to continue to defend the citizens of Israel. For your own safety and due to our intent to prevent injuring citizens who are not involved in activities against our forces, you must avoid being on any premises in which the IDF is operating and be attentive to the IDF's instructions. Anyone who interrupts IDF forces activities, conducted in order to complete the mission to bring the captured soldier home safely, will be in danger.^{(bold in the original)}

=== Concern for potential humanitarian crisis ===
Early on, all border crossings in and out of Gaza were shut. Gas stations predicted petrol supplies would run out by sundown Thursday as companies rely on generators.

On June 29, Álvaro de Soto, United Nations Special Coordinator for the Middle East Peace Process and the Secretary-General's Special Representative to the Palestine Liberation Organization and the Palestinian Authority, said that fuel in Gaza would run out in two to three days, which would result in the collapse of the sewage system. Senior UN officials estimated that Gaza has two weeks of food supply left.

UN Undersecretary-General for Humanitarian Affairs and Emergency Relief Coordinator Jan Egeland said, "No one can hide from us what they're doing, neither the Palestinian nor the Israeli side. We are appalled by seeing how they're playing with the future of defenseless civilians, including children," and warned that Gaza was three days away (as of June 29) from a humanitarian crisis.

It was predicted that all 22 Gaza hospitals would lose electricity from spare generators within one week due to the shortage of fuel and an average of 200 daily surgeries would be postponed or cancelled. There were fears that about 250 citizens suffering renal failure would face death due to the lack of electricity to run dialysis units.

On Sunday July 2, Israel reopened Gaza's main cargo crossing – the Karni crossing, allowing 50 trucks with food, medical supplies and fuel, to travel from Israel to Gaza. Other trucks carrying fuel entered northeastern Gaza through the Nahal Oz border crossing. The next day, however, citing a security threat, Israel once again closed the Karni crossing.

On July 20, Paul Hunt, the UN Human Rights Council's Special Rapporteur on the Right to the Highest Attainable Standard of Health said that some Israeli attacks on Gaza constitute a violation of international humanitarian law, and called for an independent inquiry into war crimes in Gaza by Israel. Hunt stated that "The destruction of Gaza's electricity power station is profoundly inconsistent with the health and safety of all civilians living in Gaza, especially the young, sick, infirm and elderly, as well as their right to the highest attainable standard of health, enshrined in the International Bill of Rights and other international human rights instruments."

On July 24, Israel partially re-opened the Karni crossing. PNA sources reported that the Raffah crossing might also be re-opened in the next two days. Over one month later, on August 25, for the first time in the two months since the conflict began, Israel opened the Rafah crossing for 24 hours, with 2,500 people entering Gaza and 1,500 exiting.

== Casualties ==
Five Israeli soldiers were killed during the conflict, including two in the initial Palestinian cross-border attack and one in a friendly fire incident. Six Israeli civilians were killed and nearly 40 wounded. According to B'Tselem, since June 28, 2006, there were 416 Palestinians killed (1 on June 30, 164 in July, 60 in August, 26 in September, 48 in October and 117 in November). The Izz ad-Din al-Qassam Brigades, the armed branch of Hamas, confirmed that 124 of their fighters were killed as of November 25, 2006. The Israeli government said that non-combatants killed were primarily caught in the crossfire or died during a targeted killing; some Israeli raids targeting militants resulted in the deaths of bystanders or passers-by. Palestinian ambulance workers said that Israeli troops sometimes fired at them, preventing ambulances from reaching casualties; the Israeli government said that Palestinian militants used ambulances to transport weapons and attack them. Civilians died in gun battles between Palestinian gunmen and Israeli troops. Palestinian militants operated from houses; although most were abandoned, in some cases family members refused to flee and were wounded or killed. Since many Palestinians killed were not identified as militant, civilian or "other", the figures in each category were uncertain. At least six Palestinian policemen and two presidential guards were killed in clashes with Israeli forces.

== Aftermath ==
As of December 21, 2006, over 60 Qassams had hit Israel since the declared cease-fire on November 26.

A senior member of Hamas said that the group agreed to a cease-fire with Israel "because we need a period of calm to recuperate," the Israeli newspaper Yedioth Ahronoth reported. "This lull in fighting will not bring us to speak about peace," Abu Abdullah said.

From late March to early April 2007, Israeli forces carried out raids in Gaza. On April 21, Palestinian militants launched three rockets into Israel after raids in the West Bank that killed five Palestinians, three of whom were militants. Israel responded with an airstrike that killed one suspected militant.

In May 2007, Palestinian fighters resumed shelling of Israeli towns, launching over 70 missiles in three days to the 17th.

== Reactions ==
=== Hamas ===
- Hamas [ Al-Qassam Brigades] – The military wing of Hamas, the Al-Qassam Brigades, urged Palestinians to rise up, and stated "fight your enemies, who came to their deaths. Grab your rifles and resist". On July 6, 2006, PA Interior Minister Said Siyyam of Hamas issued the Palestinian government's first, official call to arms since Israeli ground forces invaded Gaza, appealing on Thursday to all security forces to fulfill their "religious and moral duty to stand up to this aggression and cowardly Zionist invasion." The majority of PA security forces are loyal to Fatah, which opposes Hamas.

=== Israel ===
- Israel – David Siegel, spokesman for the Israeli embassy in Washington, D.C. said that "Israel did everything it could in exhausting all diplomatic options and gave Mahmoud Abbas the opportunity to return the captured Israeli... This operation can be terminated immediately, conditioned on the release of Gilad Shalit." In describing Israel's assault on Gaza, Prime Minister Ehud Olmert said, "I take personal responsibility for what is happening in Gaza. I want no one to sleep at night in Gaza. I want them to know what it feels like."

=== Palestinian Authority ===
- (Palestine) Palestinian Authority [Fatah]: – Mahmoud Abbas condemned the attacks on the bridges and power plant saying that "attacking civil infrastructure [is] a collective punishment against [the] Palestinian people and a humanitarian crime".

=== International organizations ===
- Amnesty International – The organization characterized the deliberate attacks by Israeli forces against civilian property and infrastructure in the Gaza Strip as "war crimes," and called for "an end to the wanton destruction and collective punishment being carried out by Israeli forces in the Gaza Strip." A statement further observed that "destruction of three bridges and electricity networks [...] have left half the population of the Gaza Strip without electricity and have reportedly also adversely affected the supply of water." Amnesty International also stated "The hostage-taking of Corporal Gilad Shalit, and the killing of Eliyahu Asheri, the 18-year-old settler, by Palestinian armed groups violate fundamental principles of international law. Corporal Gilad Shalit should be released immediately and unharmed".
- Arab League – Its spokesman Alaa Rushdy said that the operations were "part of aggressive Israeli policies directed against the Palestinian people, whether it be through destruction or the killing of civilians".
- European Union – The External Relations Commissioner, Benita Ferrero-Waldner, said that "Both sides need to step back from the brink before this becomes a crisis that neither can control."
- United Nations – On July 6, 2006, The United Nations Human Rights Council passed a resolution deploring Israel's military operations in the West Bank and the Gaza Strip as a violation of international law. Passed by a vote of 29–11, with 5 abstentions, the resolution, "urges all concerned parties to respect the rules of international humanitarian law, to refrain from violence against the civilian population and to treat under all circumstances all detained combatants and civilians in accordance with the Geneva Conventions." "Deep concern" was expressed over the "arbitrary arrest of Palestinian (Cabinet) ministers, members of the Palestinian Legislative Council and other officials as well as the arbitrary arrests of other civilians" and military attacks." On July 13, 2006, The United States vetoed a UN resolution condemning this military operation.

=== Other countries ===
- China – Chinese Foreign Ministry spokeswoman Jiang Yu expressed concern over the worsening humanitarian crisis, calling on Israel to "cease the military actions immediately" and for Palestinian authorities to help release the hostage as soon as possible.
- Russia – Russian foreign minister Sergey Lavrov called for the unconditional release of Shalit while urging Israel to show restraint. "Such restraint, together with the involvement of the international community, can lead to dialogue restarting and the two sides can go back to implementing the 'Road Map'".
- Sweden – "Israel has committed an indefensible act," the Swedish TT news agency quoted Swedish Prime Minister Göran Persson as saying. "It is disproportionate in terms of what the Palestinians have done," Persson said. "To go like that and remove part of a government and members of parliament is incompatible with international law." Persson cast doubt on the possibility of an exchange of prisoners. The situation "keeps getting worse and the dialogue between Israelis and Palestinians has now become virtually impossible. It is ominous," he said.
- Switzerland – "A number of actions by the Israeli defense forces in their offensive against the Gaza Strip have violated the principle of proportionality and are to be seen as forms of collective punishment, which is forbidden," the Swiss Foreign Ministry said in a statement. "There is no doubt that [Israel] has not taken the precautions required of it in international law to protect the civilian population and infrastructure," Switzerland said. Switzerland also called for the "rapid release" of the captive Israeli soldier.
- Syria – A Syrian official stated "These aggressive operations form a provocation and are unjustified. If their goal is to place responsibility for the capture of the Israeli soldier on the political leadership of Hamas – then Israel is making a scandalous mistake that is crossing the boundaries of logic."
- United States – White House Press Secretary Tony Snow said that "Israel has the right to defend itself and the lives of its citizens... [But] in any actions the government of Israel may undertake, the United States urges that it ensures that innocent civilians are not harmed and also that it avoid the unnecessary destruction of property and infrastructure." The United States vetoed a UN resolution condemning this military operation.

== See also ==
- Gaza Division
- Palestinian political violence
- Palestinian rocket attacks on Israel
- Gaza war

== Literature ==
- Barry Rubin: Israel's New Strategy in: Foreign Affairs, July/August 2006, p. 111–125
- Wolfensohn, James (2010). A Global Life.
