= Neve Yam =

Kibbutz in Haifa, Israel

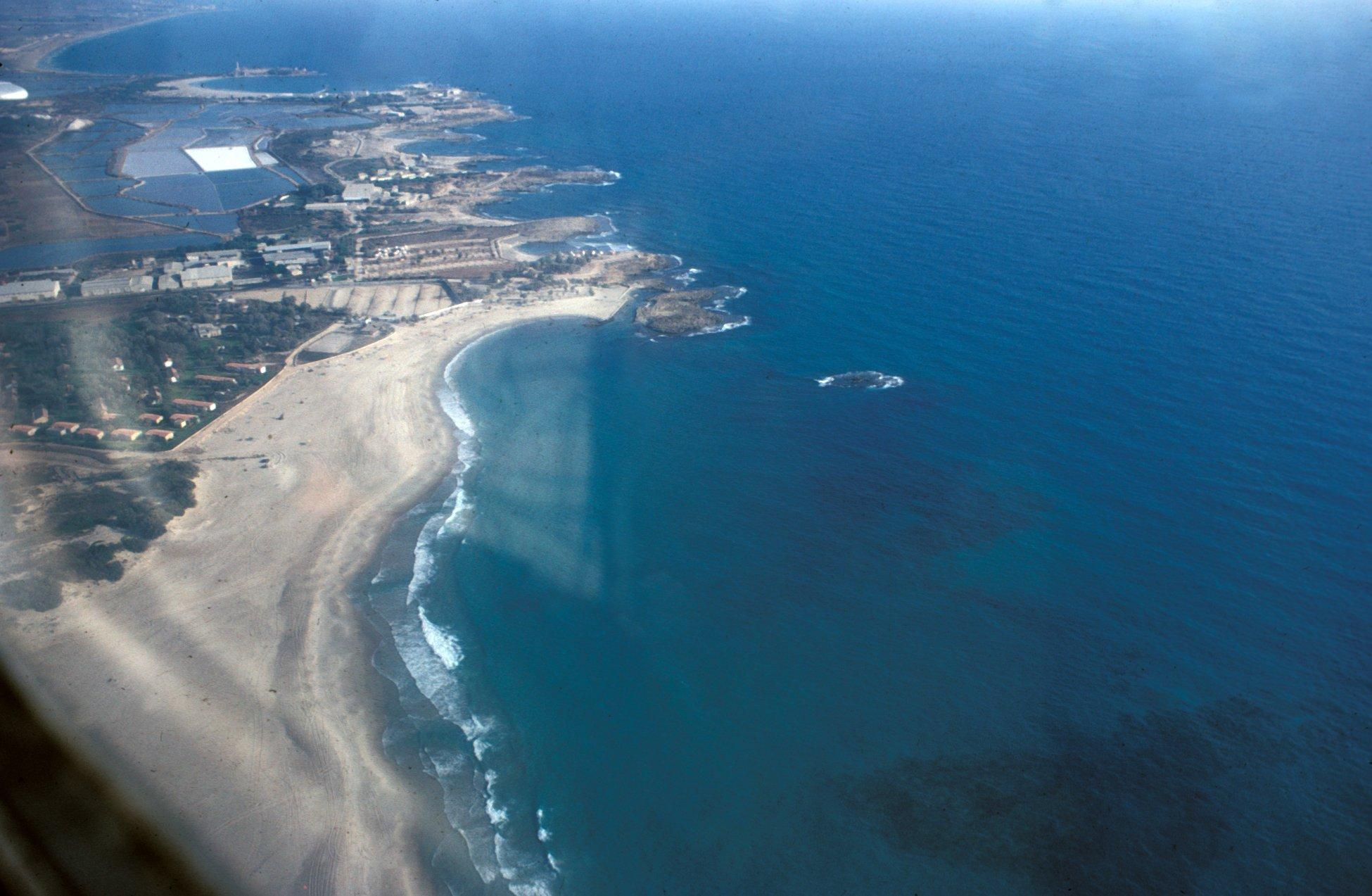

- Location within Haifa region of Israel
- Coordinates: 32°40′42″N 34°55′52″E
- Country: Israel
- District: Haifa
- Subdistrict: Hadera
- Council: Hof HaCarmel
- Affiliation: Kibbutz Movement
- Founded: 1939
- Founder: Gordonia members
- Population (2024): 301

Neve Yam (Hebrew: נְוֵה יָם, lit. 'Sea Oasis') is a kibbutz in northern Israel. Located around twenty kilometres south of Haifa, it falls under the jurisdiction of Hof HaCarmel Regional Council. In 2024 it had a population of 301.

== History ==
The kibbutz was established in 1939 by members of the Gordonia youth movement, and served as a base for the Palyam. Nearby is a geyser that is activated when the sea is stormy.

The kibbutz has fallen into financial difficulties and is attempting a rejuvenation project by attracting twenty-seven families from Elei Sinai, Dugit, and Nisanit, who had been evicted from the northern Gaza Strip as part of the Israel's unilateral disengagement plan of 2005 and allotting them land adjacent to the sea for permanent housing. The new project would give the evictees a housing solution similar to their original homes. The Israel Union for Environmental Defense is struggling to prevent the project, which it deems is too close to the beach.

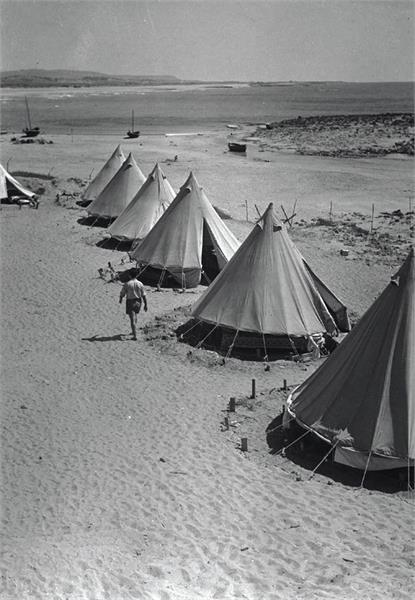
Neve Yam 1939

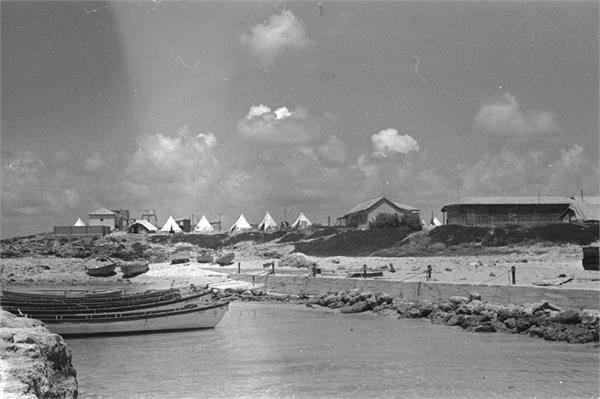
Neve Yam 1947

== Notable people ==
- Tzipi Shavit
