= Klifi =

Klifi or Kalifi (Hebrew: כליפי) is a Hebrew surname. Notable people with the surname include:

- Gila Klifi-Amir (born 1963), Israeli Brigadier General in reserve, former Gender Affairs Advisor to the Chief of Staff of the IDF
- Meir Klifi, (also Meir Kalifi) (born 1959), Israeli Major General of IDF reserve and busiessman
- Tzlil Klifi (orn 1989), Israeli songwriter, composer, and singer
