= Killing of Yael Melnik =

Killing of an Israeli girl in 2021

Lital Yael Melnik
- ליטל יעל מלניק
- A selfie image of Yael Melnik, 2 October 2021
- Born: Lital Yael Melnik; 19 July 2004; Belgium
- Died: 2 October 2021 (aged 17); Kiryat Motzkin, Israel
- Cause of death: Asphyxia
- Body discovered: 2 October 2021
- Other name: Yael Melnik
- Education: Eden High School, Kibbutz Karmia
- Occupation: High school student
- Known for: Buried alive in the sand

The killing of Yael (Lital) Melnik (Hebrew: הריגת יעל מלניק) was a widely reported criminal case in Israel involving the death of a 17-year-old girl in early October 2021. Her body was found buried alive, as her airways were filled with sand and there were no external signs of violence on her body. She was found at a construction site in Kiryat Motzkin, a city located within the Haifa metropolitan area in northern Israel.

The case drew national attention because Melnik had been hospitalized in a psychiatric facility and had formed a relationship with a much older nurse who worked there, raising concerns about abuse of power and the protection of vulnerable minors in mental health institutions.

The nurse, in his fifties, was arrested and later put on trial. The State of Israel accused him of murder, but the defense argued that Melnik's death occurred during or after a ritual they claimed she had requested. The Haifa District Court's lengthy verdict cleared him of murder, but found him guilty of negligent homicide, unlawful sexual relationship of dependency, and violation of a restraining order.

== Background ==
Yael Melnik was born as the second child in Belgium with withdrawal syndrome. Her father immigrated to Israel when she was two years old, while Yael remained in Belgium with her mother and sister, Ruth. Later, due to their mother's inability to care for them, Yael and Ruth were brought to Israel by their paternal grandparents, who raised them in Or Akiva. When Yael was eight, their father left Israel. The grandparents served as the girls' guardians and were formally appointed as such.

Yael had attention deficit disorder. She experienced significant difficulties in her life, including the absence of parents and conflicts with her grandparents, which contributed to her emotional distress and suicidal thoughts. At the age of 16, she began self-harming.

On 30 December 2020, Yael arrived at Ma'ale Carmel Hospital in Tirat Carmel with her grandmother and reported that she had considered swallowing pills. The examining physician determined that Yael had non‑specific suicidal thoughts and decided to admit her for hospitalization due to depressive content and a behavioral disorder. Yael objected to the hospitalization, but at the request of welfare authorities, the Juvenile Court issued an order for her admission to Ma'ale Carmel in January 2021.

Edward Kachura, a divorced man and father of two adult children, met Melnik while she was being treated at the hospital where he worked as a nurse and expressed feelings toward her. Melnik, who was emotionally unstable, developed romantic feelings for Kachura. She contacted him on 17 March 2021, the day after her release from hospitalization, and the two began associating, meeting outside the hospital. In April 2021, they began having sexual relations, which continued for about six months. During this period, Melnik frequently stayed away from home and spent long hours at Kachura's residence. Her grandparents, who raised her, opposed the relationship. Ruth found birth control pills among Yael's belongings and confronted her about it.

At her grandmother's request, the Hadera Magistrate's Court issued a restraining order against Kachura on 20 May 2021, and Melnik was classified as a minor at risk, according to the testimony of a social worker from Or Akiva. Despite the court order, Kachura maintained his relationship with Melnik and continued to meet her. Melnik stole money from her family to finance their encounters and gave Kachura 4,000 ILS that she had received as a birthday gift. Kachura also encouraged Melnik to use cocaine and expressed anger when she refused. Later, with her consent, the welfare authorities placed Melnik at the "Eden" youth residential facility in Kibbutz Karmia, due to her being at risk and her continued connection with Kachura.

Two days later, in the morning, Melnik was granted a weekend leave from the residential facility. She called Kachura and asked to come to his home. Despite the restraining order, he agreed, and she went to his house instead of returning to her grandmother's. They spent many hours together and had sexual relations. After the grandmother reported her disappearance, police officers arrived at Kachura's apartment. Their knocking went unanswered, and they left the premises. Subsequently, Kachura and Melnik left the apartment at around 11 p.m. to avoid the police in case they returned. They spent the rest of the night wandering the streets and, as was their habit during the months of their prohibited relationship, engaged in intimate conversations.

== The killing ==
According to Kachura's advocate at court, Melnik aimed to participate in a ritual intended to "heal the soul". She allegedly sought to enter the sand as Lital and emerge as Yael, in an effort "to rid herself of suicidal thoughts" and to undergo rebirth. After spending the night wandering the streets, the two went to the "Gan HaBanim" park in Kiryat Motzkin at 5:58 a.m., where they intended to dig a pit for Melnik to enter, while Kachura would cover her in a way that would still allow her to breathe inside. They used a toy shovel they had found discarded in the trash earlier that night and attempted to dig in the park, but were unsuccessful because the ground was too hard.

They left "Gan HaBanim" and arrived at 7:39 a.m. at the construction site of "Dar Nofarim", located at the intersection of Shai Agnon and Ehud Manor streets in Kiryat Motzkin. At the construction site, they tried to dig in several places using real shovels they found, but again without success. Before 8:15 a.m., they reached a sand mound at the site, where they dug the grave. At 8:15 a.m., Kachura went to the dumpster at the construction site and took a bamboo net and Styrofoam to place them at the bottom of the grave. At 8:21 a.m., Kachura entered a building at the construction site and took a pipe approximately 1.2 meters long and 1.6 cm in diameter. The amended indictment later stated that the pipe's diameter was only 1.5 cm. One minute later, Kachura returned to the sand mound, and Melnik, who trusted him, entered the grave, inserted the pipe into her mouth, and held it with both hands so she could breathe while covered with sand inside the grave.

According to the indictment filed by the State of Israel against Kachura, he decided to cause the death of Melnik, although no motive was presented. The indictment stated that he covered her entire body and face with sand using a shovel while she was still alive, then removed her breathing tube and forcibly prevented her from rising from the sand. After her death, he left the scene. The indictment also included charges of statutory rape of a minor under the age of 18 by exploiting a relationship of dependence, and violation of a court order. According to the indictment, Melnik's death was caused by asphyxia due to obstruction of the airways with sand and gravel that Melnik inhaled while she was still alive.

== Police investigation ==
Hussein Muassi, the construction site's security guard, noticed the couple at the site at 7 a.m., carrying two shovels. He saw them digging, and observed that Kachura brought styrofoam and additional wooden material. Sand mounds at the site partially obscured the guard's line of sight, and the couple disappeared among the hills. According to the guard, Melnik also took part in the digging, and he saw no signs of struggle between Melnik and Kachura. When the guard noticed that Kachura had left the area, he went up to the building from his booth to get a better view, but saw nothing. He spotted a passerby and asked him to come along, but the passerby was busy and left. Both the passerby and the guard were later seen in the security cameras' footage. When the guard approached the spot, he saw two shovels and then noticed hands and folded fingers with nail polish. Eight minutes after Kachura had left, the guard stood a meter and a half from the body, seeing only Melnik's hands outside the sand, motionless. He immediately ran back to his booth at 8:47 a.m., where his cellphone was. Nineteen minutes later, he called the police, fearing he might become a suspect.

The guard joined the first police car to arrive at the scene, which carried police officer Master Sergeant Liat Turgeman and municipal inspector Husni Salah. The discovery of the body distressed Liat, preventing her from taking the guard's testimony, but she instructed Husni to seal off the site as a murder scene and did not allow the Magen David Adom medical team to enter. Husni also stopped near Melnik's bag and avoided stepping on the grave. Five additional police cars arrived at the site, but no one stepped on the grave until the arrival of the forensic team. None of the witnesses saw a tube in Melnik's mouth or hands. After the sand was cleared, Melnik was found with her mouth open and sand in her mouth, nose, and eyes. Two pairs of work gloves were found at the site, containing DNA from both Kachura and Melnik. DNA from Melnik was also found on a tube near her body, and on an empty aluminum pill blister pack folded in a V shape, which had been used to clamp Melnik's nose shut.

Following the incident, Liat said in a television interview that she had left the police force. Superintendent Tomer Kaslasi, the head of the investigation team, also left the police.

The police arrested Kachura on the day of the incident (2 October 2021) at 11:40 a.m., and in his interrogation on the same day, he denied being in a romantic relationship with Melnik. He made the same denial to the police who came to his home on 5 June 2021, after Melnik had run away the previous day from "The House on Haim Street", where she had been placed by welfare authorities after she reported her grandmother to the police for violence, following the discovery of the birth control pills.

In a reconstruction conducted by the police at the scene on 5 October 2021 with Kachura, Kachura covered police officer Tomer Haddad with sand, while Haddad held the hose in his right hand and his left hand was inside the sand. Within less than a minute, Haddad sat up, said he could not breathe, felt paralysis and dizziness, and another officer lifted Haddad's legs while his head was laid back to prevent him from fainting. On 10 October 2021, Chief Superintendent Arnon Grafit, head of the Mobile Laboratories Division, conducted a feasibility test to determine whether a person could be in a position where he completely covers himself with sand while holding the same type of hose in his mouth. Grafit wore a diving suit and used a diving mask that covered his eyes, nose, and mouth, inserted earplugs, and used a hose different from the one found at the scene. Grafit breathed through the hose for six minutes while covered with sand, and also testified that he had stayed underwater for four and a half minutes without air. The police also found styrofoam and bamboo. The last was deeper in the sand.

== Verdict ==
The Haifa District Court unanimously acquitted Kachura of the murder of Melnik but convicted him on three other charges: negligent homicide, unlawful sexual intercourse by exploiting a relationship of dependency, and violation of a lawful order.

At the trial, neighbors who had partially witnessed the incident testified. The police submitted footage from cameras located at a distance from the scene but did not attempt to obtain recordings from cranes positioned directly above it, citing the contractor's claim that the footage had not been recorded. Five experts testified before the court: Superintendent Noam Amar, expert from the mobile forensic laboratory; Dr. Nurit Shtober, head of the Department of Land of Israel Studies at the University of Haifa and an expert in geomorphology; Dr. Ricardo Nachman, a pathologist from the National Institute of Forensic Medicine and the most experienced forensic physician to have worked there; Dr. Mordechai Igla, a specialist in internal medicine since 1992, in pulmonary diseases since 1994, and head of the Pulmonary Institute at Rambam Hospital since 2005; and Professor Oren Fruchter for the defense, an expert in internal and pulmonary medicine and head of the Department of Pulmonology and Respiratory Intensive Care at Wolfson Medical Center.

All the police officers testified that they did not see any shoe prints within a one-meter radius of Melnik.

Amar testified that near Melnik's body, footprints of the guard and of Kachura were found. On a nearby sand mound, footprints of Melnik and Kachura were discovered. In the police reconstruction, Kachura told investigators that he and Melnik had tried to dig at that spot but did not succeed. Amar was present and photographed the feasibility test conducted by Grafit. Amar concluded that Kachura and Melnik had walked around the construction site, collected the shovels and work gloves, and walked with them, via the dirt/sand road, at least up to the area where the fabric bag and a shoeprint similar to that of Melnik were found. Amar also concluded, with a high degree of probability, that Melnik had moved about the site independently, and with the same level of certainty that she entered the pit and was covered, or covered herself, without physical resistance. He testified that he could not determine whether the covering of Melnik's head with sand, which caused her death, was self-inflicted or done by another person. Amar also confirmed finding the V‑shaped folded packet precisely where Kachura had described, and the court determined that this supported Kachura's version that the folded medicine package had been used as a plug for Melnik's nostril.

Shtober testified that from the nature of Grafit's self-covering actions, it could be inferred that Melnik's self-covering was not likely. Shtober determined that the sand was fine marine sand containing kurkar stones, and testified that the way the body was found corresponded "unequivocally to the first experiment, in which one police officer covers another". She drew an illustration showing that the surface covering the officer was flat when covered by another person, as opposed to a mound formed when an individual covered themselves.

Nachman testified that a large amount of sand was found in the pharynx and airways of Melnik, and that passive penetration of sand into the lower respiratory tract was improbable. He also ruled out suicide. Nachman's finding was that Melnik's death resulted from asphyxia caused by obstruction of the airways due to the inhalation of sand and gravel. This indicated that Melnik was alive when she was covered with sand. Nachman found no significant or fatal traumatic injuries on Melnik's body, nor any signs indicating struggle or defensive actions. In the examination of body fluids, he did not detect any toxicological substances. Nachman did not exclude the possibility that the external openings of the airways were blocked by some other mechanism, in addition to the sand obstruction, but he found no signs of strangulation or pressure applied to the neck or body that could have prevented Melnik from breathing on her own. Nachman determined that the presence of sand in the eyes of Melnik indicated that her eyes had been exposed to sand at a stage he could not determine – before, during, or after death. He declined to address the hypothesis of breathing through a tube, referring instead to a respiratory specialist, but stated that an increase in carbon dioxide in the respiratory centers of the brainstem causes deep inhalation due to a sensation of air hunger and an effort to draw more air into the lungs, which might have led to the inhalation of more sand into the respiratory system. He concluded that death by asphyxiation in this case likely occurred within a few minutes. Nachman also noted the cough reflex, which operated automatically when a foreign body entered the respiratory tract, clarifying that the brainstem activated this reflex, and there was nothing pharmacological that suppressed this process.

Igla testified that breathing through a plastic tube, as Melnik did, increased the dead space volume, which was the volume of air that was not involved in exchanging carbon dioxide for oxygen during breathing. He explained that consequently the amount of fresh air entering the lungs was smaller, causing an increase in carbon dioxide and a decrease in oxygen. The result was restlessness and faster breathing, and it was expected that the person breathing would remove the tube to get fresh air, including removing the head from the sand. Igla determined that the fact that her mouth and airway were filled with sand indicated that there was respiratory effort while she was covered in sand, which was contrary to the basic instinct to remove the head from the sand in distress, and he assumed that someone or something disturbed her. He also determined that it was unlikely Melnik would have remained motionless as found at the scene even while experiencing respiratory distress, given the breathing instinct. Igla ruled out the possibility that within ten minutes of inhaling from the tube she moved from consciousness to unconsciousness and death, because the survival instinct would cause a change in her body position to open the airway. Igla also mentioned the cough reflex.

The court ruled that Fruchter's version of events was plausible, not theoretical, supported by evidence, and more consistent with the findings at the scene than the "incriminating version". Fruchter testified that a person could cough even while lying down, and that it was not necessary for every cough to involve a noticeable movement of the body or, in particular, a forward motion of the head, as Nachman claimed, and Fruchter was the expert on this matter, as Nachman himself acknowledged. The court therefore ruled that Dr. Nachman was not an expert on the cough mechanism, unlike Professor Fruchter and Dr. Igla, for whom this was an area of expertise. Nachman also stated that it was impossible to determine from the autopsy whether Melnik had in fact coughed.

Fruchter testified, citing professional literature, that a typical cough began with an inhalation of air and inflation of the lungs, followed by a forceful exhalation against a closed glottis (with the vocal cords tightened). According to Fruchter, every cough mechanism begins with a deep inhalation. Igla likewise testified that the first phase of the cough mechanism was inhalation for the purpose of filling the lungs, though he later changed his testimony. Consequently, the court accepted Fruchter's explanation of the cough mechanism and held that there was reasonable doubt regarding Nachman's assumption that the cough reflex would have first caused an expulsive cough accompanied by a head lift. The court found it possible that after sand had entered Melnik's mouth, she attempted to cough, and that her first reflexive action was to take a deep breath to fill her lungs, resulting in the inhalation of sand into her respiratory tract. This possibility was supported by the autopsy findings, which showed that Melnik had actively inhaled sand and gravel into her airways and lungs while she was still alive. The court also noted Fruchter's assertion that Melnik could have quickly fallen into a state of confusion and then unconsciousness due to carbon dioxide poisoning caused by breathing through a tube, which prevented proper gas exchange. Fruchter noted that Melnik's breathing through a long and narrow rubber tube caused increased respiratory effort, accompanied by a significant decrease in ventilation and a marked increase in dead space volume.

The court reminded that Nachman himself had admitted that in the event of loss of consciousness combined with airway obstruction, Melnik would have had no way to "escape" her condition with her head and face covered in sand. The court further ruled that even if, as Nachman claimed, every cough must be "aggressive", that still did not exclude the possibility that if Melnik's consciousness had already been impaired, she might have coughed and raised her head but not enough to free it from the sand. Although Nachman noted that little sand was found on Melnik's face, the court held that it was impossible to determine whether her head might have been buried deeper before she coughed, as Nachman himself did not rule out that possibility. The court accepted Fruchter's evidentiary foundation that the sand Melnik inhaled, mixed with saliva and other fluids in her mouth, formed a muddy mass that blocked her airways. Fruchter pointed to a narrow point beneath the Adam's apple and explained that if this area was filled with mud, no airflow could pass through at all.

The court convicted Kachura of negligent homicide, as he left the scene before Melnik emerged from the sand. Kachura claimed in his defense that she had lifted her head from the sand, told him to leave, and he did not know what happened afterward. Before leaving, he asked Melnik if everything was all right, meaning whether she had received the spiritual experience she sought. She replied that it was, and told him to go so that he could tell the police she was not with him, while she would return to Or Akiva. Kachura testified that he believed the ritual had ended when he left and she left, went home, calmed her grandmother, and would return by noon, but he did not imagine she would go back into the sand. When asked why he left Melnik, Kachura said that people were watching them and might call the police because they were digging, and their goal was to avoid police contact. For that reason, Melnik had removed the SIM card from her mobile phone, so the police would not be able to locate her, and Kachura did not call her once he returned home. Kachura's testimony differed from statements he gave to the police, in which he claimed he had not wanted to be involved in Melnik's ritual, and in another version said he did not want Melnik to associate with someone else, as she had done when they briefly separated after a quarrel. The prosecution adopted that breakup as a possible motive for murder, though it did not cite it in the indictment but only in its summations.

The court ruled that Kachura was guilty of negligent homicide because he left the area hastily, without ensuring that Melnik had come out of the sand, gathered her belongings, and was on her way to the Metronit station, as Kachura claimed they had agreed. The judges found Kachura's version of leaving Melnik alone to be contrary to all logic or "common sense", and they questioned him extensively on the matter. Presiding Judge Yehiel Lifshitz asked how it was possible that Kachura, who had spent the entire night with Melnik, was afraid, by his own admission, that she might harm herself after discovering that she had taken a surgical knife from his home (which police later found in Kachura's pants when he was arrested), nevertheless engaged in a bizarre ritual with her and then left her alone without helping her up or asking how she felt and whether the experience had helped her. Kachura replied: "That is exactly what I asked; she said she was fine". Judge Lifshitz further asked why he had not called her from home to check if she reached her grandmother's, and Kachura answered that she had removed the SIM card. Lifshitz also asked how he could have believed that she had completed the experience if, according to his version, she covered herself again and thus met her death. To this, Kachura answered that he had no explanation.

== Public reaction ==
The case sparked public outrage due to the abusive nature of the relationship and Kachura's prolonged exploitation of Melnik. Two days after Melnik's body was found, men and women from the organizations "Israel Lobby Against Sexual Violence" and "Women for Women" held a demonstration in her memory. The protest expressed the pain of the most vulnerable people in society, psychiatric patients hospitalized in wards, who had no one to protect them.

Following Melnik's death, a call for a review was raised within the mental health system.
