= Gordonia (youth movement) =

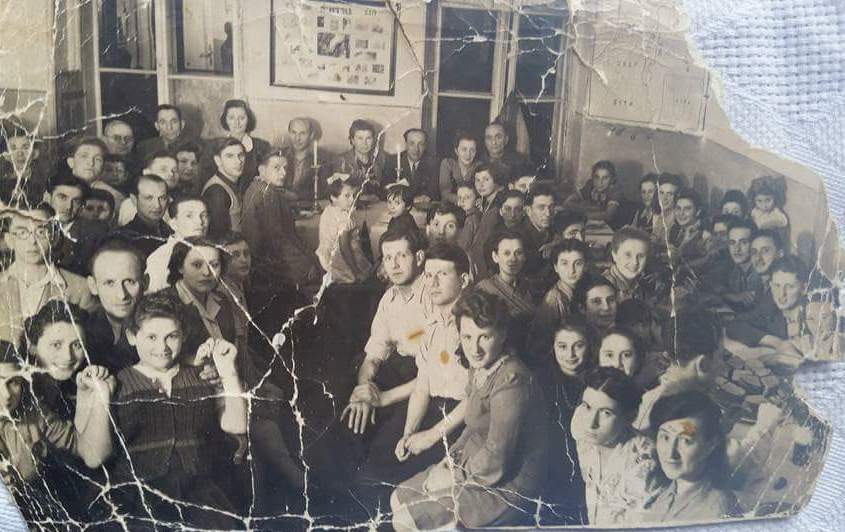
Members of Gordonia in Poland, 1947

Gordonia (Hebrew: גורדוניה) was a Zionist youth movement established in 1925. Its ideological foundation was based on the Labor Zionist teachings of A. D. Gordon. Members of the movement studied Hebrew and, upon completion of their training, formed organized groups in preparation for immigration to Palestine.

== History ==
Founded in 1925 in Poland, Gordonia was a Zionist youth movement that promoted Jewish immigration to kibbutzim in Palestine during the interwar period. These settlement efforts contributed to the development of the kibbutz movement in Palestine and later in the State of Israel.

Established after several other Labor Zionist movements, Gordonia initially faced challenges related to its ideological identity. It emerged in part as a response to movements such as Hashomer Hatzair, which it viewed as influenced by non-Zionist ideologies, such as Marxism. Aligning itself with Gordon's teachings, Gordonia emphasized a theory of colonialism in which legitimate ownership of land is established through labor.

=== United States ===
In the United States, Gordonia had a relatively small presence, primarily in the Washington D.C.-Baltimore and Dallas metropolitan areas. It operated a Jewish summer camp, Moshava, near Annapolis, Maryland. The American branch of Gordonia merged with Habonim Dror in April 1938.

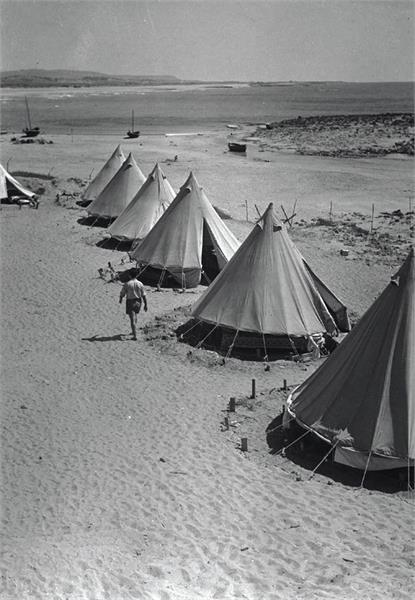
Gordonia members establishing kibbutz at Neve Yam 1939
