= Tzipi Shavit =

Israeli actress, comedian entertainer (born 1947)

- ציפי שביט
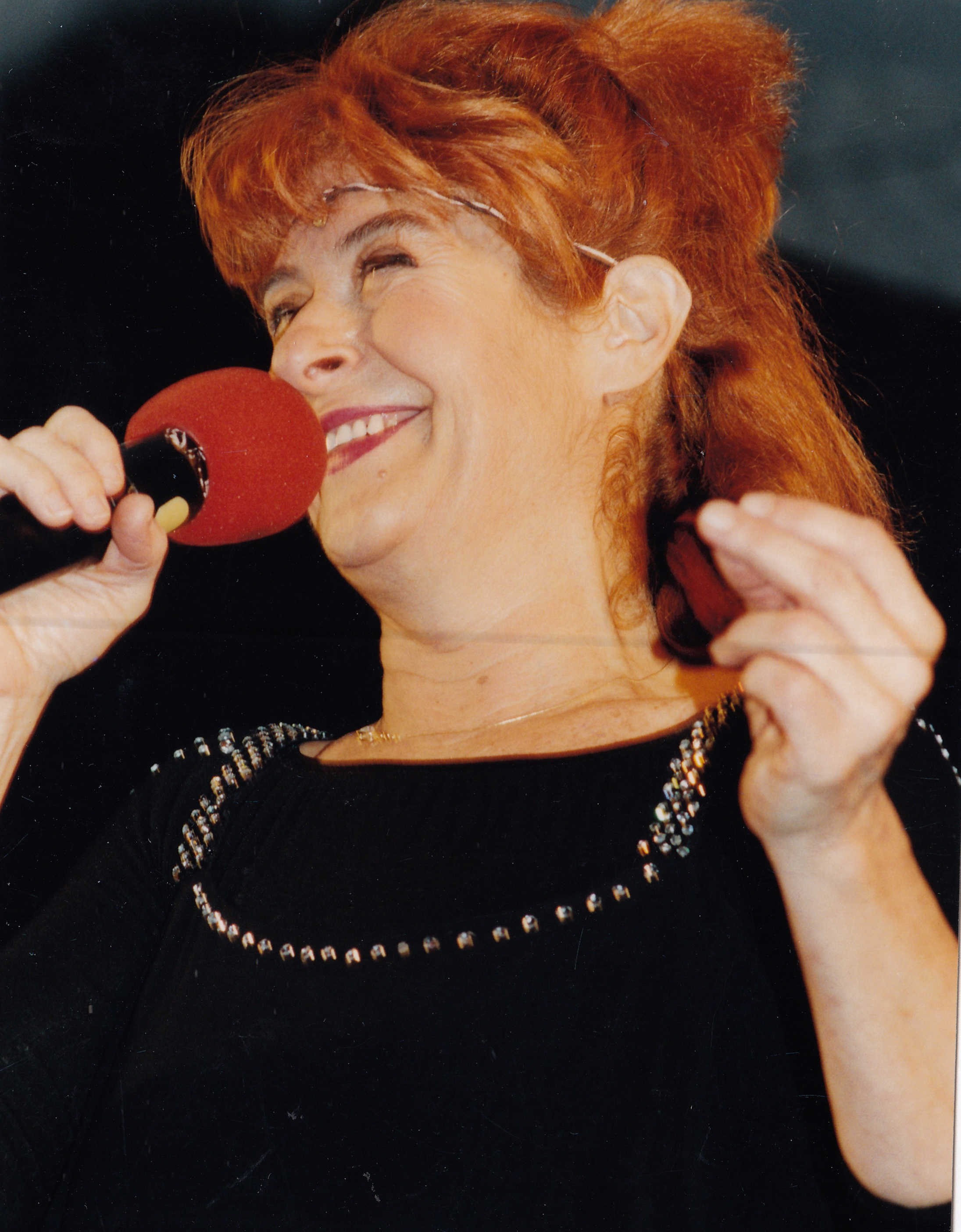
- Born: Tzipora Shavit; April 1, 1947 (age 79); Neve Yam, Mandatory Palestine
- Occupations: Actress, comedian, entertainer
- Years active: 1960s – present
- Spouse: Avishay Dekel
- Children: 2

Tzipi Shavit (Hebrew: ציפי שביט; born April 1, 1947) is an Israeli actress, comedian entertainer, who is best known as a children's entertainer. She is sometimes described by the media as the "First Lady of Israeli entertainment."

== Early life ==
Shavit was born in kibbutz Neve Yam, Israel. She served in the Israel Defense Forces in Tzevet Havai of the Southern Command.

== Career ==
Shortly after that, she participated in the film Our Neighborhood. In 1969 her manager got her a part in the stage comedy show A Funny Thing Happened to Me On The Way To Suez written by Saul Biber. The show was canceled shortly thereafter due to a publicized objection by a bereaved mother who lost her son in The Sinai War. In 1971, Shavit played in the stage musical Jumbo in which she sang the song "Everyone Went to the Jumbo" to the tune of the Italian song "Volevo un gatto nero". In 1972, Shavit acted in the stage show Chocolate Mint Gum - The Zionist Congress of Laughter alongside Yardena Arazi. In the Spring of 2016, performed in the play "Noah's Ark." In 2017, she starred in the play My Mother the General (Hebrew: אמי הגנרלית) an adaptation from the 1979 film by the same name. Shavit was a featured singer in the song and music video "Casanova (Good Aunt)" by Israeli singers Eve and Lear (Hebrew: איב אנד ליר).

== Personal life ==
Shavit resides in north Tel Aviv with her husband, producer Avishay Dekel. They have two children and six grandchildren. Shavit was a close friend of fellow Israeli actor Sefi Rivlin.

In a 2017 interview, she explained that her positivity was partly thanks to her Jewish beliefs and faith.

== Honors ==
In 2020 Shavit was honored as one of the torchbearers in the national Israeli Independence Day ceremony.
