= Jamal Abu Samhadana =

Palestinian politician (1963–2006)

- جمال أبو سمهدانة

Director General of the Executive Force
- In office 20 April 2006 – 8 June 2006
- President: Mahmoud Abbas
- Prime Minister: Ismail Haniyeh

Personal details
- Born: 8 February 1963 Rafah, Gaza Strip
- Died: 8 June 2006 (aged 43) Rafah, Gaza Strip
- Party: Hamas
- Occupation: politician
- Known for: Founding and leading the Popular Resistance Committees

Jamal Abu Samhadana (Arabic: جمال أبو سمهدانة, 8 February 1963 – 8 June 2006), from Rafah in the Gaza Strip, was the founder and leader of the Popular Resistance Committees, a former Fatah and Tanzim member, and number two on Israel's list of wanted terrorists.

Abu Samhadana survived an Israeli missile strike in the Gaza Strip in December 2004, but was killed by the Israeli Air Force on 8 June 2006.

== Appointment as chief of Executive Force ==
On 20 April 2006, Abu Samhadana was appointed Director General of the Executive Force, a new security forces in Gaza, by Said Seyam, Interior Minister of the Palestinian National Authority's new Hamas-led government. Abu Samhadana was quoted as saying that "We have only one enemy. They are Jews. We have no other enemy. I will continue to carry the rifle and pull the trigger whenever required to defend my people."

The appointment "sparked new criticism from the U.S. and Israel and intensified the struggle for control of some 70,000 Palestinian security forces" between Hamas and President Mahmoud Abbas. Abbas subsequently issued a decree banning the formation of the Executive Force that Abu Samhadana was to have headed. However, Hamas defied the President's decree and proceeded with the nomination and the formation of the force.

== Assassination ==
Although Israel acknowledged that Hamas was largely sticking to a ceasefire, on 8 June 2006, he was assassinated, along with at least three other PRC members, by four missiles fired by Israeli Apache helicopters, guided by Israeli reconnaissance drones, at a PRC camp in Rafah.

== Repercussions of the assassination ==
At his funeral Samhadana’s supporters called for revenge. Hours after his assassination rockets were fired at Sderot in Israel. The IDF retaliated by bombarding the launch sites on a Gaza beach. During the bombardment period, the civilian Ghalia family was all but wiped out in an explosion. Analysts trace the Samhadana assassination to the rocket fire (on Sderot), through a series of IDF shellings, rocket attacks and commando raids on Gaza that killed over three dozen people, mostly civilians, to the capture of Israeli Corporal Gilad Shalit on June 25. Two days after Shalit's capture, the IDF launched Operation Summer Rains killing over 400 Palestinians and wounding 650.
