= Marc Garlasco =

American intelligence analyst (born 1970)

Marc Garlasco (born September 4, 1970) is the Deputy Director of the US Department of Defense's Civilian Protection Center of Excellence. Early in his career, Garlasco served for seven years at the Pentagon as a mid-level intelligence analyst, later becoming chief of high-value targeting. Garlasco left in 2003 and joined Human Rights Watch (HRW) as a senior military expert, where he investigated human rights issues in a number of different conflict zones. He resigned from HRW in February 2010 and has since worked as a specialist on civilian protection, war crimes investigations, identification of weapons and civilian harm mitigation for – among others – the United Nations UNAMA, COI on Libya, COI on Syria, the Center for Naval Analysis (CNA), and the International Committee of the Red Cross (ICRC). He has worked as a military advisor for the Dutch non-governmental organization PAX since 2020. Garlasco lives in New York.

== Career ==
Garlasco has a B.A. in government from St. John's University 1988–1992 and an M.A. in international relations from the Elliott School of International Affairs at the George Washington University(1992–1995) He lives in Pleasantville, New York. Garlasco was the senior military analyst in Human Rights Watch's (HRW) Emergencies Division. He specialized in battle damage assessment, military operations, and interrogations.

=== The Pentagon ===
He worked with a defense contractor before being hired as an intelligence professional at the Defense Intelligence Agency working in the Pentagon; he survived the 9/11 attack on the building. He claims he was Chief of high-value targeting in The Pentagon during the Iraq War where he claims that he led the effort to track and target Saddam Hussein. The initial targets and attack, known as the "DECAP strike", was identified by the CIA, and the actual attacks were planned by TLAM and F-117 (see:Dora Farms).

Garlasco was a member of the Operation Desert Fox (Iraq) Battle Damage Assessment team in 1998, led a Pentagon Battle Damage Assessment team to Kosovo in 1999 and recommended several thousand aimpoints on targets during military operations in Iraq and Serbia. Later that year Garlasco debriefed Iraqi nationals to gather intelligence about Saddam Hussein. He described it as "contingency planning for a war that was probably never going to be fought." He also participated in over 50 interrogations as a subject matter expert. In total, Garlasco served for seven years in the Pentagon.

In 2003, Garlasco was responsible for dropping two, laser-guided, 500-kilogram bombs on a house in the Tuwaisi, neighborhood of Basra, Iraq, that he believed to contain Saddam Hussein's cousin Ali Hassan al-Majid, also known as Chemical Ali, the man responsible for launching poison gas attacks on Kurds in Iraq beginning in 1988. Watching the attack via satellite form a room in the Pentagon, Garlasco threw his arms in the air and shouted: "I just blew up Chemical Ali!" However, Chemical Ali was not in the house; 17 other people were killed instead. Garlasco left his Pentagon job in 2003 two weeks after the failed attack to take a position as senior military analyst at Human Rights Watch.

Garlasco explained the calculus of civilian deaths in high-value targeting to the television news program 60 Minutes this way, "Our number was 30. So, for example, Saddam Hussein. If you're gonna kill up to 29 people in a strike against Saddam Hussein, that's not a problem. But once you hit that number 30, we actually had to go to either President Bush, or Secretary of Defense Rumsfeld." Garlasco told the interviewer that prior to the invasion of Iraq, he personally recommended 50 high-value targets for air strikes, but, according to Garlasco, none of the targets on his list was actually killed. Rather, "a couple of hundred civilians at least" were killed in strikes he recommended.

Garlasco defended the efforts made by the American military to minimize civilian casualties, "I don't think people really appreciate the gymnastics that the U.S. military goes through in order to make sure that they're not killing civilians". He responded to the question "If so much care is being taken why are so many civilians getting killed?" by stating "Because the Taliban are violating international law, and because the U.S. just doesn't have enough troops on the ground. You have the Taliban shielding in people's homes. And you have this small number of troops on the ground. And sometimes the only thing they can do is drop bombs."

=== Human Rights Watch ===
After leaving the Pentagon, Garlasco joined Human Rights Watch as a senior military analyst; his task was to document laws-of-war violations and other atrocities committed during significant conflicts around the world. In an interview he gave for The Washington Post Garlasco described the transition from targeter to human rights advocate: "I had been a part of it, so it was a lot harder than I thought it would be. It really dawned on me that these aren't just nameless, faceless targets. This is a place where people are going to feel ramifications for a long time."

In December 2003, Garlasco co-authored the report Off Target – The Conduct of the War and Civilian Casualties in Iraq after carrying out field work with two other HRW staff to investigate the effect of the air war, ground war, and the immediate post-combat environment on civilians after the fall of Baghdad to U.S. led Coalition forces in the Iraq War. Garlasco and colleagues focused on the main fighting areas in the Tigris and Euphrates river valleys where civilian deaths had been reported, visiting ten cities in total. The report focused on the identification and investigation of potential violations of international humanitarian law by both Coalition and Iraqi forces together with the identification of patterns of conflict which may have resulted in avoidable civilian casualties. Garlasco and his co-author stated that Iraqi forces had committed various violations of international humanitarian law which may have resulted in significant civilian casualties and claimed that the widespread use of cluster munitions in populated areas by Coalition forces killed or wounded more than 1,000 civilians.

In October 2004, Garlasco co-authored the report 'Razing Rafah: Mass Home Demolitions in the Gaza Strip' after carrying out research with two other HRW staff in the Gaza Strip, Israel, and Egypt. The report documented what it described as a "pattern of illegal demolitions" by the IDF in Rafah, a refugee camp and city at the southern end of the Gaza Strip on the border with Egypt where sixteen thousand people lost their homes after the Israeli government approved a plan to expand the de facto "buffer zone" in May 2004. Garlasco and colleagues examined the background to and effects of the demolitions, the security situation in Rafah, the IDF's main stated rationales for the demolitions, responding to and preventing attacks on its forces and the suppression of weapons smuggling through tunnels from Egypt, and concluded that in most cases the demolitions were "carried out in the absence of military necessity" in violation of international law.

Garlasco has made it a personal objective to prevent the use of cluster munitions. He co-authored the 2006 Human Rights Watch report condemning Israel's use of such weapons in Lebanon and a report in 2008 documenting how civilians living in South Ossetia suffered the use of cluster munitions by both the Russian and Georgian armies. Colin Kahl, a professor of security studies at Georgetown University, said that Garlasco "knows more about airstrikes than anyone in the world who isn't in the military currently", adding that "when Marc says stuff is messed up, the military has to take it seriously. It's not some wing nut in a human rights group out to get the military".

According to Haaretz, Garlasco worked in the Pentagon for seven years and "was known over the last years of his career for his harsh condemnation of Israel".

John H. Richardson, a writer at Esquire, writes that Garlasco's work on torture scandals in Iraq resulted in testimony from American soldiers that led directly to John McCain's anti-torture amendment. Richardson also writes that Garlasco was one of the first foreigners to cross the border into Georgia during its war with Russia, and that during the Gaza War Garlasco lived in an apartment in the middle of the war zone and spent weeks visiting hospitals and bomb sites.

Garlasco has attracted some criticism for his reporting, with the Ottawa Citizen, for example, suggesting in an editorial that he "has made a career of painting Israel as a criminal state".

Garlasco appeared as an expert in the documentary film No End in Sight, which examined in detail some of the key decisions made by the US military and the Pentagon in the early days after the invasion of Iraq. He was also featured in a 60 Minutes story on US military targeting practices that aired October 28, 2007.

=== Exit from HRW over Nazi memorabilia ===
On September 14, 2009, Garlasco was suspended with pay after a controversy arose when it was publicized that he collects Nazi memorabilia. Criticism that had started to appear, posted by what The Guardian called pro-Israeli bloggers, had questioned the appropriateness of Garlasco's hobby. Garlasco has stated his hobby of collecting German and American World War memorabilia from the Second World War is because of his family history and his interest in military history.

==== Initial reports ====
On September 9, 2009, The Jerusalem Post quoted blogger Omri Ceren saying that Garlasco is "obsessed with the color and pageantry of Nazism, has published a detailed 430-page book on Nazi war paraphernalia, and participates in forums for Nazi souvenir collectors". Other newspapers such as The Guardian and Haaretz covered the controversy in the following days.

The Guardian reported on what it described as "mounting internet attacks on Garlasco". Pro-Israeli bloggers had questioned the appropriateness of Garlasco's hobby and discovered one blogpost in which Garlasco wrote, "The leather SS jacket makes my blood go cold it is so COOL!"

Israeli Prime Minister Benyamin Netanyahu's policy director commented that Human Rights Watch's employment of "a man who trades and collects Nazi memorabilia" as its senior military expert is a "new low".

==== HRW response ====
Though Garlasco initially responded to the allegations under the pen name Flak88, writing: "I would reply, but I don't want to encourage them... Anyway, I doubt if they read my book. More than anything else, it is related to my work." He subsequently apologized, writing on Huffington Post, "I deeply regret causing pain and offense with a handful of juvenile and tasteless postings I made on two websites that study Second World War artifacts". Garlasco added, "I've never hidden my hobby, because there's nothing shameful in it, however weird it might seem to those who aren't fascinated by military history". He also wrote that the allegations of Nazi sympathies were "defamatory nonsense, spread maliciously by people with an interest in trying to undermine Human Rights Watch's reporting," and that "I work to expose war crimes and the Nazis were the worst war criminals of all time". He added, "[p]recisely because it's so obvious that the Nazis were evil, I never realized that other people, including friends and colleagues, might wonder why I care about these things". He went on to say that "I told my daughters, as I wrote in my book, that "the war was horrible and cruel, that Germany lost and for that we should be thankful".

HRW Communications Director Emma Daly at first responded to the charge by saying, "Marc Garlasco is not pro-Nazi. These allegations are monstrous. He does not delve into Nazi memorabilia. Garlasco is a student of military history and he has an interest in military history". HRW later issued an official statement that the accusation against Garlasco "is demonstrably false and fits into a campaign to deflect attention from Human Rights Watch's rigorous and detailed reporting on violations of international human rights and humanitarian law by the Israeli government," adding that Garlasco "has never held or expressed Nazi or anti-Semitic views". HRW associate director Carroll Bogert accused The Guardian of "repeat[ing] defamatory nonsense unworthy of [the] newspaper," adding that "[t]he allegations of pro-Nazi sympathies are part of a larger campaign to smear non-governmental organisations which criticise the Israel Defense Forces' conduct of the Gaza offensive". Iain Levine, the watchdog's programme director responded by saying that "The Israeli government is trying to eliminate the space for legitimate criticism of the conduct of the IDF, and this is the latest salvo in that campaign".

In what has been described by Ed Pilkington of The Guardian as an "abrupt change of tact" (sic) for Human Rights Watch, Garlasco was "suspended with pay" from HRW pending an investigation. According to Bogert, "[W]e have questions as to whether we've learned everything we need to know". Regarding the suspension, HRW has indicated "This is not a disciplinary measure. Human Rights Watch stands behind Garlasco's research and analysis".

==== Other responses ====
Critics of Human Rights Watch have suggested that Garlasco's enthusiasm for Nazi-era badges and uniforms goes beyond historical interest and raises questions Nazi sympathy or anti-Semitism.

NGO Monitor, an Israeli NGO that monitors human rights organisations for perceived political bias, described Garlasco's hobby as "problematic" and "insensitive". John Richardson of Esquire magazine wrote that because Garlasco has criticized Israel for alleged human-rights violations, "NGO Monitor has decided to try to destroy Marc Garlasco — not to argue with him or dispute his statistics, but to destroy him personally."

Antony Lerman, former director of the Institute for Jewish Policy Research, wrote that Human Rights Watch failed to see Garlasco's hobby "could be used to discredit his role as author of highly critical reports of Israel's military conduct in Gaza". Lerman further wrote that Garlasco working "on reports critical of Hamas and Hezbollah was ignored", concluding that "as another excuse to attack HRW, and deflect attention from its reports' findings, the Garlasco affair was a gift".

Yaron Ezrahi, a professor of Political Science at the Hebrew University of Jerusalem, said he did not believe that Mr. Garlasco's interest in memorabilia could support allegations of "premeditated bias," though he indicated it may hurt Human Rights Watch's credibility, and that the revelations had "armed the right-wing fanatics" who try to "demonize" anybody who questions the effects of Israeli military operations. A group of ten Israeli rights groups also protested that the Israeli government has been attempting to "instill fear and silence or alarm vital organizations" that were engaging in free public discourse.

In The Christian Science Monitor, Robert Marquand claimed Garlasco's critics were using him "to distract from or obfuscate findings that war crimes and crimes against humanity may have taken place in Gaza" and that a U.N. report by Richard Goldstone showed illegal white phosphorus use consistent with Garlasco's first hand testimony.

In Nazi scandal hits human rights group, Katie Engelhart in Maclean's magazine reported that "For HRW, the timing of the exposé could not be worse. The group has thrown its weight behind the UN-sponsored Goldstone report, which accuses both Israel and the Palestinians of committing war crimes in the Gaza strip earlier this year. Garlasco's actions will surely lead many to question the group's credibility".

According to The New York Times, HRW Middle East advisory committee member Helena Cobban questioned on her blog whether Garlasco's military collecting activities were "something an employer like Human Rights Watch ought to be worried about? After consideration, I say Yes". NGO Monitor head Gerald M. Steinberg, a professor of Political Science at Bar Ilan University, argued that Human Rights Watch's response to the matter was "too little, too late". Cobban says in suspending Garlasco Human Rights Watch is now "in a better position to take part in the public discussion in this country on what our government should be doing with regard to the Goldstone report".

==== Aftermath ====
Emma Daly confirmed in March 2010 that Garlasco resigned from Human Rights Watch in February 2010, and offered no elaboration. A reporter from The Sunday Times (London) attempted to contact Garlasco, who wouldn't comment. A friend of Garlasco's indicated he had "in effect" been fired, but had entered into a confidentiality agreement with HRW in which he would be paid for the remainder of his contract if he kept silent. In early March 2010, Garlasco's name was removed from the website.

=== United Nations ===
Beginning in 2011, Garlasco served as senior civilian protection officer for United Nations Assistance Mission in Afghanistan (UNAMA). Heading the UN's Protection of Civilians office, Garlasco monitored civilian casualty rates, and admonished Taliban leader Mullah Mohammad Omar to refrain from using mines. In early 2012, as the U.N. senior military advisor for the Human Rights Council's (HRC) Independent Commission of Inquiry on Libya, he investigated civilian casualties while leading a survey of NATO's activities in Libya.

== Bibliography ==
=== Book ===
- The Flak Badges of the Luftwaffe and Heer, 2008, B&D Publishing LLC. 462 pages

=== Human Rights Watch reports co-authored by Marc Garlasco ===
- Docherty, Bonnie (April 14, 2009). "A Dying Practice: Use of Cluster Munitions by Russia and Georgia in August 2008". Human Rights Watch.
- Van Esveld, Bill (March 25, 2009). "Rain of Fire: Israel's Unlawful Use of White Phosphorus in Gaza". Human Rights Watch.
- “Troops in Contact”: Airstrikes and Civilian Deaths in Afghanistan. Human Rights Watch. September 8, 2008. ISBN 1564323625.
- Docherty, Bonnie (February 16, 2008). Flooding South Lebanon: Israel's Use of Cluster Munitions in Lebanon in July and August 2006. Human Rights Watch (Report).
- "No Blood, No Foul": Soldiers' Accounts of Detainee Abuse in Iraq". Human Rights Watch. July 22, 2006.
- "Leadership Failure: Firsthand Accounts of Torture of Iraqi Detainees by the U.S. Army's 82nd Airborne Division". Human Rights Watch. September 22, 2005.
- "Razing Rafah: Mass Home Demolitions in the Gaza Strip". Human Rights Watch. October 17, 2004.
- Docherty, Bonnie (December 11, 2003). "Off Target: The Conduct of the War and Civilian Casualties in Iraq". Human Rights Watch.
