= Dugit =

Former Israeli settlement in the Gaza Strip

Dugit: דּוּגִית (Hebrew)
- Former Israeli settlement
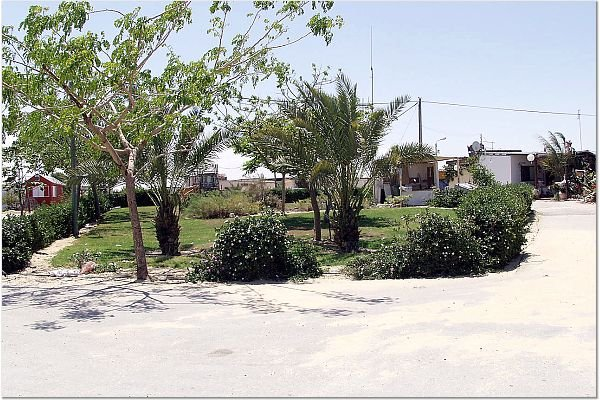

- Location within the Gaza Strip
- Coordinates: 31°34′26″N 34°29′21″E
- Country: Israel
- Founded: 1990

Dugit (Hebrew: דּוּגִית, lit. 'dinghy') was an Israeli settlement located in the northern tip of the Gaza Strip closest to the shore of the Mediterranean Sea in a mini-settlement bloc including Elei Sinai and Nisanit. While Dugit was under the municipal authority of the Hof Aza Regional Council it was not physically in the Gush Katif bloc where the bulk of the Gush Katif settlements were located. During the Gaza war, the site came under full operational control of the Israel Defense Forces and is currently used as a military outpost.

== History ==
The non-religious village was founded in May 1990 by a group of three families of fishermen close to the Shikma Beach with the assistance of the Amana settlement organization. These families, and others that joined later on, lived in trailers for about ten years until permanent homes were built. Another building expansion project was already in advanced planning stages.

== Economy ==
The main source of income was from the sea: fishing, rescue services, fish ponds, tourism, fish restaurants, etc.

== Unilateral Disengagement ==
Unlike virtually all the other settlements slated for destruction as part of the disengagement plan, whose inhabitants were forcibly evicted by the Israeli Army and Israeli Police, the families of Dugit chose to co-operate with the eviction orders and most had already packed and abandoned their homes before the official date.

== Rebuilding attempts ==
Avi Farhan from Elei Sinai and a part of his family established a new group including families from Dugit and Nisanit with hope to establish a new community. The government agreed in 2006 to acclimatize this group in Palmachim. The plan was then changed to resettle in the Givat Olga beach neighbourhood of Hadera. As of 2009, Neve Yam is attempting a rejuvenation project by attracting these families by allotting them land adjacent to the sea for permanent housing. The new project would give the evictees a housing and employment solution similar to that of their original homes. The Israel Union for Environmental Defense is struggling to prevent the project it deems is too close to the beach.

== 2023 Gaza war ==
The site of Dugit was recaptured by the IDF following the invasion of its ground forces into the Gaza Strip on October 27, 2023. Their entry into Dugit was part of a pincer move to surround Gaza City, located to the south of Dugit.
