= Karmia =

Kibbutz in southern Israel

Karmia: כרמיה (Hebrew)
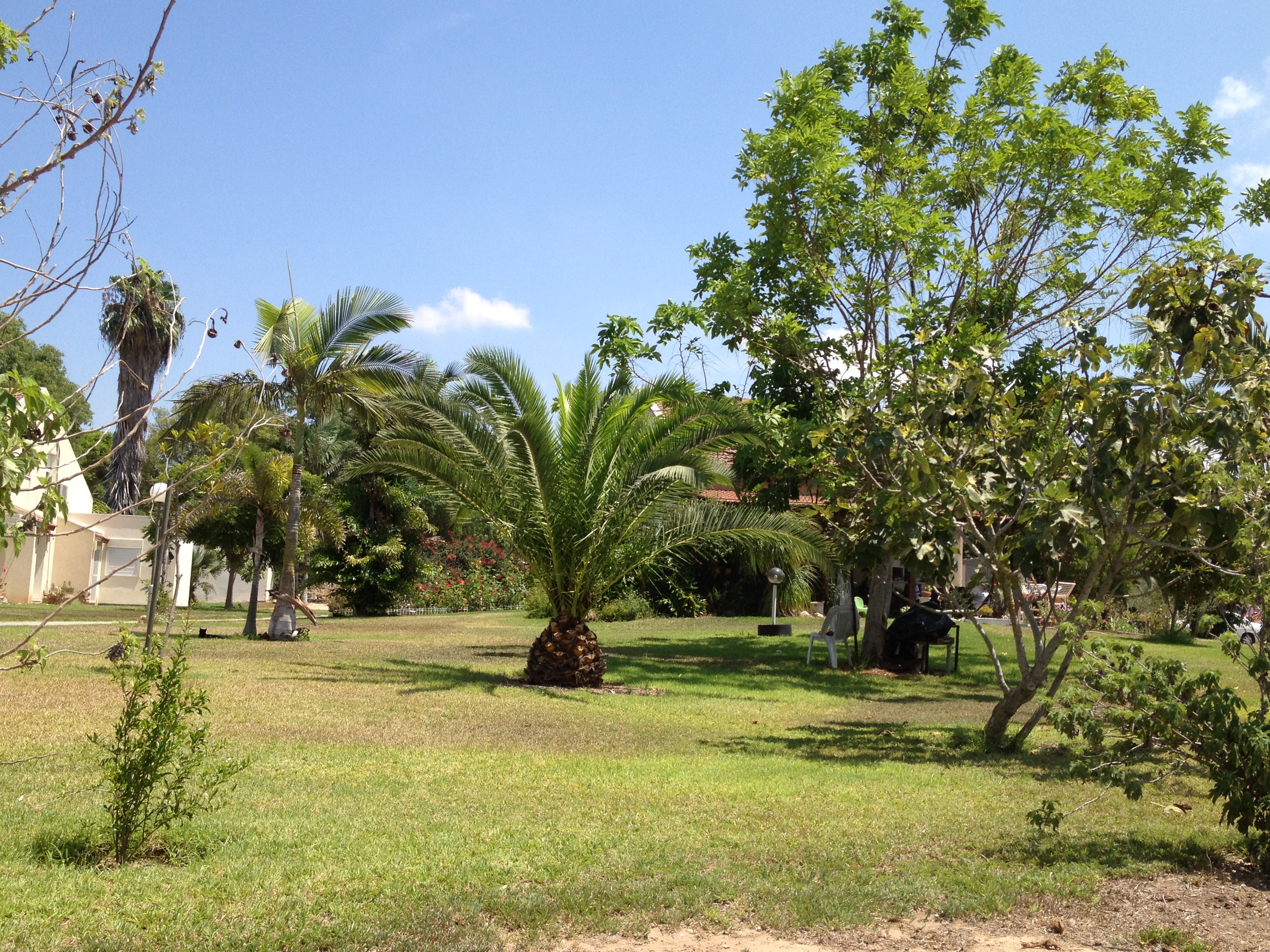

- Location within Ashkelon region of Israel
- Coordinates: 31°36′15″N 34°32′33″E
- Country: Israel
- District: Southern
- Subdistrict: Ashkelon
- Council: Hof Ashkelon
- Affiliation: Kibbutz Movement
- Founded: 20 May 1950
- Founder: French and Tunisian Hashomer Hatzair members
- Population (2024): 730

Karmia (Hebrew: כַּרְמִיָּה) is a kibbutz in southern Israel. Located between Ashkelon and the Gaza Strip, it falls under the jurisdiction of Hof Ashkelon Regional Council. In 2024 it had a population of 730. Before 1948 it was the site of an Arab village called 'Hiribya'. Its name is derived from the Hebrew for vineyard (Hebrew: כרם, Kerem), which were common in the area.

== Pre-Israel History ==
=== Bronze Age ===
Settlement at the site of Karmia dates back to the Canaanite period.

=== Crusader period ===
It was known as "Forbie" to the Crusaders. In 1226, the Syrian geographer Yaqut al-Hamawi called it "Firbiya" (or "Farbaya") and noted that it was within the administrative jurisdiction of Ascalon.

The village was the site of a crucial battle, called the Battle of La Forbie, between the Crusaders and the Ayyubids, which ended in a decisive Ayyubid victory. Historians consider it second in strategic significance only to the Battle of Hattin in 1187.

A circular well, made of masonry, and the foundations of a small tower were still found there in the late 19th century.

=== Ottoman period ===
Hirbiya was incorporated into the Ottoman Empire in 1517 with the rest of Palestine, by the 1596 tax records it was located in the nahiya (subdistrict) of Gaza, a part of the Liwa of Gaza. It had a population of 160 households and 15 bachelors, an estimated 963 person, all Muslim. The villagers paid a fixed tax rate of 33.3% on various products, including wheat, barley, grapes, fruit, and cotton; a total of 35,500 akçe. All of the revenue went to a waqf.

During the 17th and 18th centuries, settlement in the region declined due to nomadic attacks on local communities. The residents of abandoned villages moved to elsewhere but the land continued to be cultivated by neighboring villages.

An Ottoman village list from 1870 showed that Herbija had 58 houses and a population of 206, which included only men.

In the late 19th century Hirbiya had a rectangular layout, although some of its adobe brick houses were scattered in surrounding orchards. The village was surrounded by a pond, a well, and several gardens. To the south were remains of the Crusader fortress.

=== British mandate ===
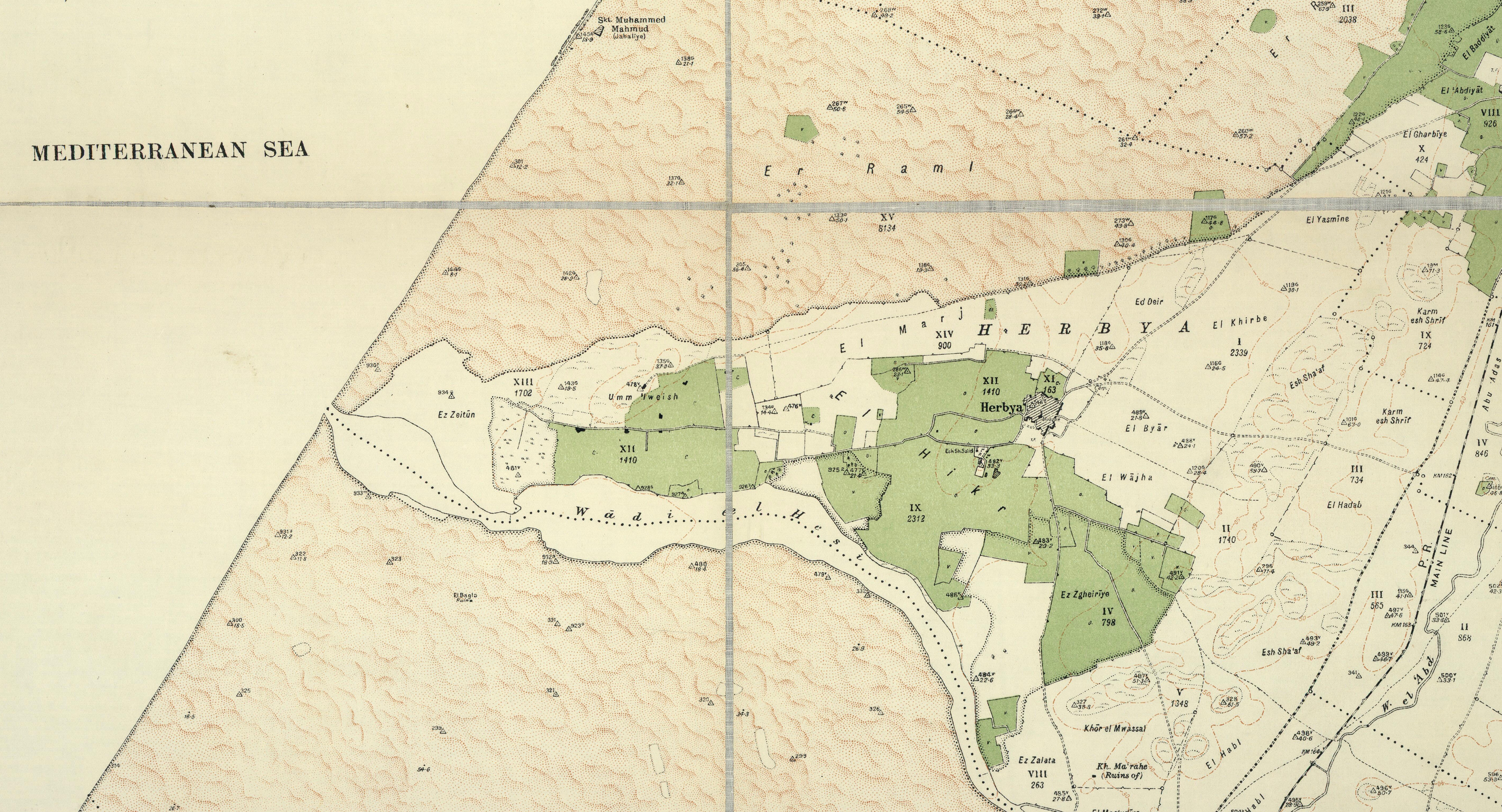
Hiribya 1931 1:20,000

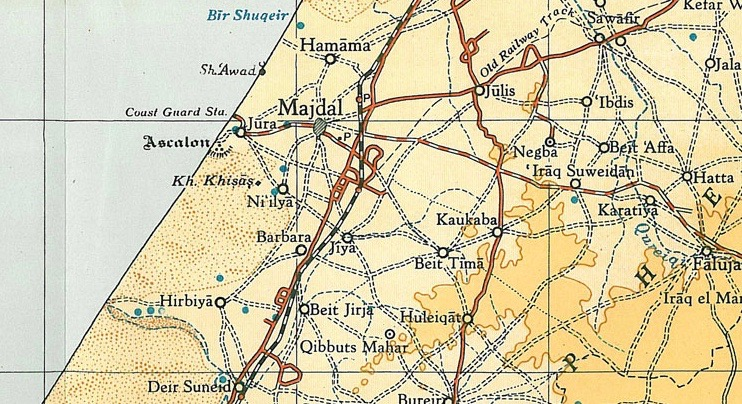
Hiribya 1945 1:250,000

In the 1922 census of Palestine, conducted by the British mandate authorities, Herbia had a population of 1,037 inhabitants, consisting of 1031 Muslims and 6 Orthodox Christians, The population had increased in the 1931 census to 1,520; 1,510 Muslims and 10 Christians, in 234 houses. Hirbiya had a mosque and elementary school, both located in the village center. The school opened in 1922 and had an enrollment of 124 students in the 1940s.

In 1945 Hiribya had a population of 2,300; 2,200 Muslims, 40 Christians and 60 Jews, with a total of 22,312 dunams of land, according to an official land and population survey. Of this, 2,765 dunams were used for citrus and bananas, 6,106 dunams were for plantations and irrigable land, 2,037 for cereals, while 92 dunams were built-up land.

== Israeli History ==
Hirbiya was targeted in October 1948 during Operation Yoav, coming under aerial bombardment on October 15–16. A planned attack was called off when Israeli forces learned that a large Egyptian Army force was quartered in the village. Khalidi speculates that the village fell to Israeli forces in early November, shortly after the capture of Ashkelon.

Following the war the area was incorporated into the State of Israel. According to Khalidi, only the mosque, which was used as a warehouse, and one residential building, remain from earlier times.

The kibbutz was established on 20 May 1950 by a Nahal gar'in of Hashomer Hatzair members from France and Tunisia who had been trained in Beit Zera, including Gad Partok, a Holocaust survivor.

The kibbutz absorbed 54 families from the Elei Sinai and Nisanit Israeli settlements, which were evacuated as part of the disengagement plan. Since 2006 it has been repeatedly hit by Qassam rockets fired from the Gaza Strip, including one that landed on its football pitch, and another Qassam rocket that landed inside a house and injured 3 people severely in 2005.

In 2019 it was temporarily evacuated due to forest fires.

=== October 7th and Iron Swords War ===
On October 7th, the kibbutz was defended by IDF soldiers. The area was attacked again two days later.

The kibbutz was evacuated following the October 7 attacks, although some residents refused to leave. Most of the evacuees were housed at Kibbutz Nahsholim near Tel Aviv. It was supposed to reopen in July of 2024, but most community members didn't agree to return.

== Economy ==
In 1972 a blanket factory was established in the kibbutz.

Karmia is home to solar energy startup EDI Energy, and Ortech, which refurbishes bomb shelters. The drone company CopterPIX was founded there.
