= Meir Klifi =

Israeli general (born 1959)

Meir Klifi, 2009

Meir Klifi-Amir Hebrew: מאיר כליפי-אמיר, also Meir Kalifi; born 1959) is a major general of the IDF reserve and a businessman. His positions include: commander of the 202nd Paratroopers Battalion, commander of the 55th Paratroopers Brigade, commander of the 84th "Givati" Brigade, commander of the Sinai Division, commander of the Galilee Division, deputy commander of the Israeli Ground Forces, and the military secretary to the prime minister for Ehud Olmert and Benjamin Netanyahu.

After the discharge from the IDF in 2010, his activities included being Chairman and CEO of Friends of the IDF (2015-2020).

== Personal ==
He is married to Gila Klifi-Amir, Israeli brigadier general in reserve, former gender affairs advisor to the chief of staff of the IDF.
