= Elei Sinai =

Former Israeli settlement in the Gaza Strip

Elei Sinai: אֱלֵי סִינַי (Hebrew)
- Former Israeli settlement
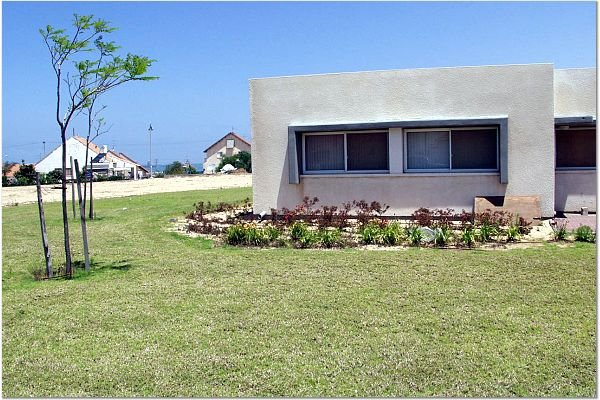

- Location within the Gaza Strip
- Coordinates: 31°35′01″N 34°30′09″E
- Country: Israel
- Founded: 1982
- Population (2004): 389

Elei Sinai (Hebrew: אֱלֵי סִינַי, lit. 'Towards Sinai') was an Israeli settlement in the north of the Gaza Strip. In 2005, it had a population of 389. During the Gaza war, the site came under full operational control of the Israel Defense Forces and is currently used as a military outpost.

== Founding ==
Elei Sinai was established in 1982 (Sukkot 5743) by a group who had been evicted from Yamit in the Sinai Peninsula. It was named for the yearning to return to the Sinai desert, where Yamit was located.

Avi Farhan, a Yamit expellee, and Arik Herfez, whose daughter had been killed by Palestinian militants, were two of the most notable residents.

== Unilateral Disengagement ==
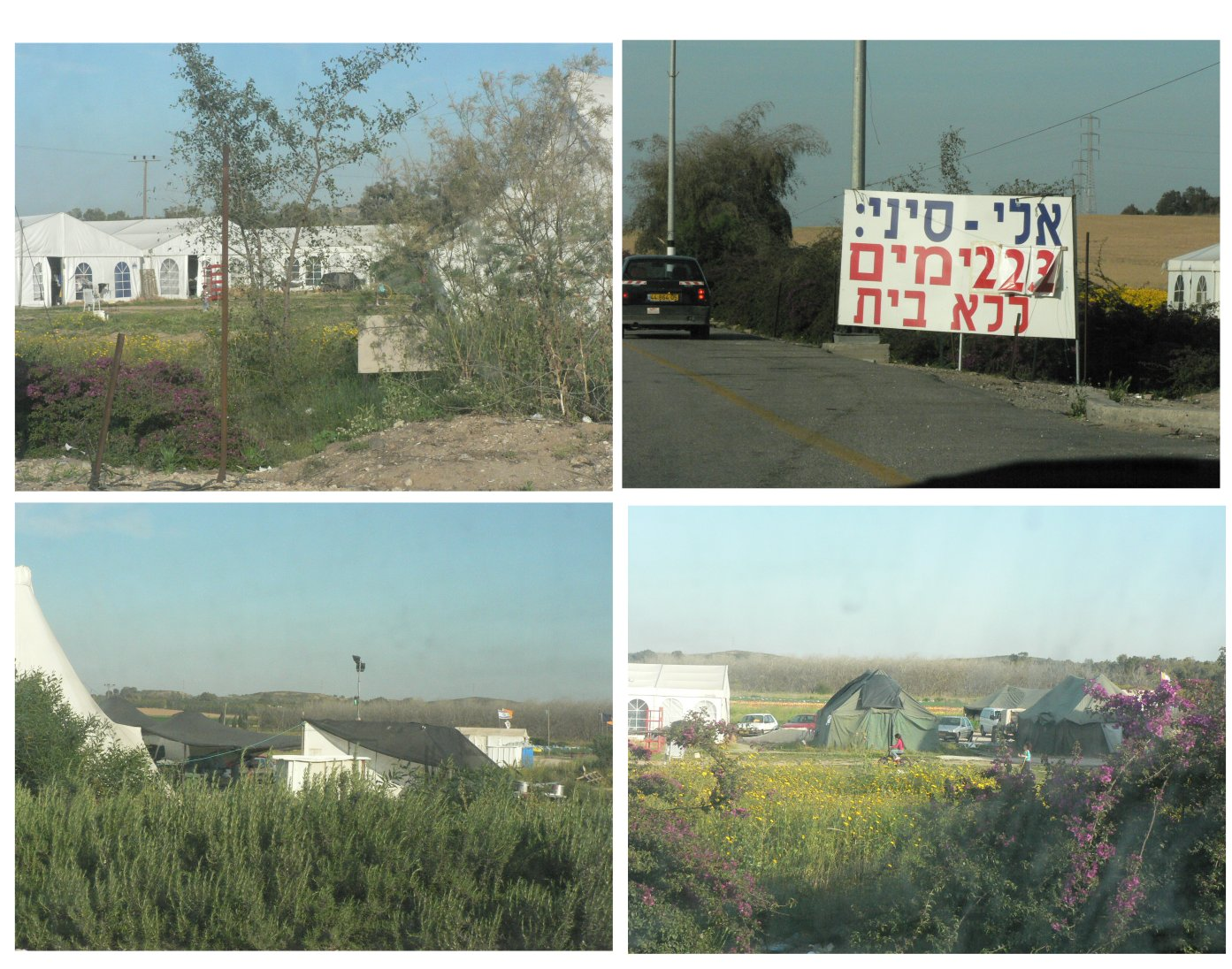
Residents of Elei Sinai camping in Yad Mordechai, just over the border from their former homes.

Among the arguments in opposition to Israel's unilateral disengagement plan, which stated that the settlers should be evicted from Elei Sinai, was a proposal by Farhan allowing the settlers to remain in their homes as Palestinian citizens, an idea the Palestinians and the Israeli government rejected.

The residents had actually left their homes voluntarily but returned after realizing that the government had no place to send them.

After the eviction, a group of fifty families established themselves at the Yad Mordechai junction as a protest that the government hadn't found a community solution for them. Others were sent to the Shirat HaYam hotel. The rest of the settlement later split into a few groups, including those now found in:

- Karmia, who were promised future homes in Talmei Yafeh close to Ashkelon.
- Or HaNer, who were promised future homes in the Bat Hadar neighborhood close to Ashkelon.

Farhan and a part of his family establish a new group and hope to establish a new community in the center of the country. The government agreed in 2006 to acclimatize this group in Palmachim.

== 2023 Gaza war ==
The site of Elei Sinai was captured by the IDF following the invasion of its ground forces into the Gaza Strip on October 27, 2023. Their entry into Elei Sinai was part of a pincer move to surround Gaza City, located to the south of Elei Sinai.
