= Road map for peace =

2002 US two-state solution proposal for the Israeli–Palestinian conflict

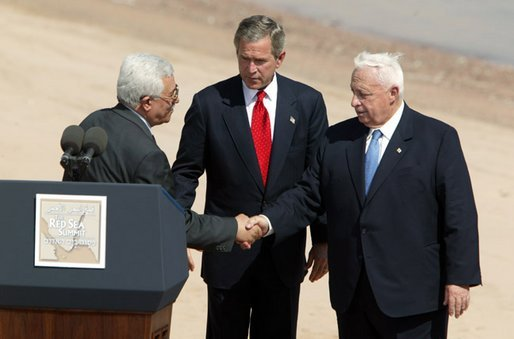
Palestinian prime minister Mahmoud Abbas, United States president George W. Bush, and Israeli prime minister Ariel Sharon after reading statement to the press during the closing moments of the Red Sea Summit in Aqaba, Jordan, 4 June 2003.

The roadmap for peace or road map for peace (Hebrew: מפת הדרכים Mapat had'rakhim, Arabic: خارطة طريق السلام Khāriṭa ṭarīq as-salām) was a plan to resolve the Israeli–Palestinian conflict proposed by the Quartet on the Middle East. The principles of the plan, originally drafted by U.S. Foreign Service Officer Donald Blome, were first outlined by U.S. president George W. Bush in a speech on 24 June 2002, in which he called for an independent Palestinian state living side by side with Israel in peace. A draft version from the Bush administration was published as early as 14 November 2002. The final text was released on 30 April 2003. The process reached a deadlock early in phase I and the plan was never implemented.

== Background ==
In March 2002, in response to a wave of Palestinian suicide attacks as part of the Second Intifada that culminated in the "Passover massacre", Israel launched a major military operation in the West Bank, dubbed Operation Defensive Shield. Virtually the entire Palestinian public administration was destroyed by the Israeli army. Israel re-established its full exclusive military control over the West Bank, including Areas A and B, which were intended to be handed over to the Palestinian Authority within the framework of the Oslo II Accord. The army largely destroyed Arafat's Compound in Ramallah, containing the main offices of the PA, and placed President Yasser Arafat under siege.

The United States, European Union, United Nations, and Russia formed the Quartet on the Middle East and tried to save the peace process with a new plan, against the backdrop of the U.S. war on terror, which dominated international politics at the time.

== Development of the plan ==
The Roadmap was based on a speech given by U.S. president George W. Bush on 24 June 2002. An EU-composed first draft, proposed in September 2002, was put aside in favour of a later-U.S.-draft. The draft version from the Bush administration was published as early as 14 November 2002. The EU pushed the Quartet to present the final text on 20 December 2002, but failed, due to Israeli opposition. Israeli prime minister Ariel Sharon pledged support for the Roadmap, provided the Palestinian state was restricted to 42% of the West Bank and 70% of the Gaza strip; and under full Israeli control. Israel ruled out the division of Jerusalem and the Palestinian right of return and requested more than 100 changes to the Roadmap. Only after Prime Minister Sharon's re-election, the nomination of Mahmoud Abbas as Palestinian prime minister, and the installation of a new Palestinian government was the plan finally published on 30 April 2003, the day the invasion phase of the Iraq War ended. In a statement, President Bush made clear that the plan was developed by the United States, not by the Quartet.

== The plan ==
Described as a "performance-based and goal-driven roadmap", the Roadmap was built on goals without going into details. It may be summarized as:

- End the violence;
- Halt settlement activity;
- Reform Palestinian institutions;
- Accept Israel's right to exist;
- Establish a viable, sovereign Palestinian state;
- and reach a final settlement on all issues by 2005.

However, as a performance-based plan, progress would require and depend upon the good faith efforts of the parties, and their compliance with each of the obligations the Quartet put into the plan. This made the Roadmap different from former peace plans; there was no (unrealistic) time-scheme to reach the goal, a Palestinian state.

The Roadmap was composed of three phases:

I. Satisfying the preconditions for a Palestinian state;

II. Creating an independent Palestinian state with provisional borders;

III. Negotiations on a permanent status agreement, recognition of a Palestinian state with permanent borders and end of conflict.

- Phase I (finished as early as May 2003): Mutual recognition; an immediate and unconditional ceasefire to end armed activity and all acts of violence against Israelis anywhere; Palestinian political-institutional reform; Palestinian elections; Israeli withdrawal to the positions of 28 September 2000 (the start date of the Second Intifada; the plan does not speak of any further withdrawal). Israel refrains from deportations, attacks on civilians, demolitions and destructions, and other measures; reopens Palestinian institutions in East Jerusalem; improves the humanitarian situation, fully implements the Bertini report, eases movement; freezes settlement expansion and dismantles settlement outposts built since 2001.
- Phase II (June–December 2003): An international summit to support Palestinian economic recovery and launch a process leading to establishment of an independent Palestinian state with provisional borders; revival of multilateral engagement on issues including regional water resources, environment, economic development, refugees, and arms control issues; Arab states restore pre-intifada links to Israel (including trade offices, etc.).
- Phase III (2004–2005): A second international conference; permanent status agreement and end of conflict; agreement on final borders, clarification of the highly controversial question of the fate of Jerusalem, refugees and settlements; Arab states to agree to peace deals with Israel.

Note: A provisional state in Phase II would thus include all existing settlements and exclude East Jerusalem. Although the plan was presented with considerable delay, the original timetable was not adapted.

== Israel's response and conditions ==
While Palestinian prime minister Mahmoud Abbas accepted the Roadmap, right-wing ministers in the Israeli government opposed it. On 12 May 2003, it was reported that Israeli prime minister Ariel Sharon had stated that a settlement freeze, a main Road Map commitment, would be "impossible" due to the need to build new houses for settlers who start families. Prime Minister Sharon asked then-US secretary of state, Colin Powell "What do you want, for a pregnant woman to have an abortion just because she is a settler?" Sharon could only accept the plan with "some artful language", thus the Government accepted "the steps set out in the Roadmap", rather than the Roadmap itself.

On 25 May 2003, the prime minister's Cabinet approved the Roadmap with 14 reservations. These included:

  - The Palestinians will dismantle the (PA's) security organizations and reform their structures;
  - The Palestinians must cease violence and incitement and educate for peace;
  - The Palestinians must complete the dismantling of Hamas and other militant groups and their infrastructure, and collect and destroy all illegal weapons;
  - No progress to Phase II before all above-mentioned conditions are fulfilled;
  - (Unlike the Palestinians) Israel is not obliged to cease violence and incitement against the other party, pursuant to the Roadmap.
1. No progress to the next phase before complete cessation of terror, violence and incitement. No timelines for carrying out the Roadmap.
2. Replacement and reform of the current leadership in the Palestinian Authority (including Yasser Arafat). Otherwise no progress to Phase II.
3. The process will be monitored by the United States (not the Quartet).
4. The character of the provisional Palestinian state will be determined through negotiations. The provisional state will be demilitarized, with provisional borders and "certain aspects of sovereignty", and subjected to Israeli control of the entry and exit of all persons and cargo, plus its airspace and electromagnetic spectrum (radio, television, internet, radar, etc.).
5. Declaration of Israel's right to exist as a Jewish state, as well as the waiver of any right of return of Palestinian refugees to Israel.
6. Prior to the final settlement talks in Phase III, no discussions about settlements, Jerusalem and borders would be allowed. Topics would be limited to a settlement freeze and illegal outposts.
7. No references other than the key provisions of United Nations Security Council resolutions 242 and 338. No reference to other peace initiatives (it is unclear if the Oslo Accords are included).
8. Withdrawal to the September 2000 lines will be conditional.
9. Israel is not bound to the Bertini Report with respect to improving Palestinian humanitarian issues.

=== Validity of the reservations ===
The Roadmap was offered for acceptance "as it is", without room for adaptations. The Government statement of 25 May 2003, however, made clear that Israel regarded its reservations part of the Roadmap:

The Government of Israel affirms the Prime Minister's announcement, and resolves that all of Israel's comments, as addressed in the Administration's statement, will be implemented in full during the implementation phase of the Roadmap.

Furthermore, the Government definitively ruled out the right of return:

The Government of Israel further clarifies that, both during and subsequent to the political process, the resolution of the issue of the refugees will not include their entry into or settlement within the State of Israel.

A U.S. official, however, said that U.S. commitment did not mean that all of Israel's demands would be met. Abbas called the Israeli reservations to the map "not part of the map and ... not relevant to its implementation, and ... not acceptable to the Palestinians."

== Start and deadlock ==
=== Restructuring the Palestinian government ===
The first step on the Roadmap was the appointment of the first-ever Palestinian prime minister Mahmoud Abbas (also known as Abu Mazen), by Palestinian leader Yasser Arafat. The United States and Israel demanded that Arafat be neutralized or sidelined in the Roadmap process, claiming that he had not done enough to stop Palestinian attacks against Israelis while in charge. The United States refused to release the Roadmap until a Palestinian prime minister was in place. Abbas was appointed on 19 March 2003, clearing the way for the release of the Roadmap's details on 30 April 2003.

=== Hostilities after publication ===
The publication of the Roadmap did not stop the violence of the Second Intifada. Hamas rejected it, saying that "Abu Mazen is betraying the Palestinian people's struggle and jihad in order to appease the USA and to avoid angering Israel". From 1 to 17 May 2003, 43 Palestinian civilians were killed, including 19 who were engaged in hostilities or were targeted by Israel., as well as four Israeli civilians. After a suicide attack on 18 May, which killed 6 Israelis, the army carried out 35 punitive demolitions of Palestinian homes. On 27 May 2003, Israeli prime minister Ariel Sharon stated that the "occupation" of Palestinian territories was "a terrible thing for Israel and for the Palestinians" and "can't continue endlessly." Sharon's phraseology prompted shock from many in Israel, leading to a clarification that by "occupation," Sharon meant control of millions of Palestinian lives rather than actual physical occupation of land.

The Route 60 ambush took place on 20 June, as Secretary of State Colin Powell was in Jerusalem engaging in peace negotiations.

=== Summits ===
President Bush visited the Middle East from 2 to 4 June 2003 for two summits as part of a seven-day overseas trip through Europe and Russia in an attempt to push the Roadmap. On 2 June, Israel freed about 100 Palestinian prisoners before the first summit in Egypt as a sign of goodwill. The list consisted largely of administrative detainees who were due to be released. Subsequent prisoner releases involved members of Hamas and Islamic Jihad, but the government insisted that those slated for release did not have Israeli "blood on their hands." In Egypt on 3 June, President Bush met with the leaders of Egypt, Saudi Arabia, Jordan and Bahrain, and with Prime Minister Abbas. The Arab leaders announced their support for the Roadmap and promised to work on cutting off funding to terrorist groups. There was hope that the Roadmap for Peace could succeed.

However, after President Bush left the region, violence resumed. On 5 June, two Israelis were found beaten and stabbed to death. Days later, Hamas attacked the Erez checkpoint, killing four Israeli soldiers, as part of its effort to undermine the Roadmap. In response, Israel targeted Hamas leaders with airstrikes.

=== Hudna ===
On 29 June 2003, a tentative unilateral cease-fire ("hudna" in Arabic) was declared by the Palestinian Authority and four major Palestinian groups. Palestinian Islamic Jihad and Hamas announced a joint three-month cease-fire, while Yasser Arafat's Fatah faction declared a six-month truce. The cease-fire was later joined by the Democratic Front for the Liberation of Palestine. One condition of maintaining the truce was a demand for the release of prisoners from Israeli jails, which was not part of the Roadmap process. This coincided with a visit to the region by United States National Security Advisor Condoleezza Rice.

On 1 July 2003, in Jerusalem, Sharon and Abbas held a first-ever ceremonial opening to peace talks, televised live in both Arabic and Hebrew. Both leaders said the violence had gone on too long and that they were committed to the Roadmap for peace. On 2 July, Israeli troops pulled out of Bethlehem and transferred control to Palestinian security forces. The plan required that Palestinian police take over from withdrawing Israeli forces and stop any anti-Israeli militant attacks. At the same time, the U.S. announced a $30 million aid package to the Palestinian Authority to help rebuild infrastructure destroyed by Israeli incursions.

The hudna quickly collapsed. On 3 July, the IDF killed 2 civilians, one of them allegedly wanted by Israel. In an IDF operation to arrest Hamas members, gunfire broke out in which an Israeli soldier and two alleged Hamas militants were killed. A new cycle of violence occurred. Hamas and Fatah each responded with a suicide bombing on 12 August, each killing one Israeli civilian. Despite this de facto violation of the hudna, Hamas stated that the cease-fire would continue.

Hostilities then escalated. The Israeli army killed Islamic Jihad's Muhammad Seeder on 14 August 2003; the Jerusalem bus 2 massacre by Hamas and Islamic Jihad on 19 August, killed 23 and wounded 136 people. Israel reacted causing large-scale destruction to Palestinian population centres. On 21 August, Israel assassinated Hamas' political leader Ismail Abu Shanab. Shanab, who supported a two-state solution, strongly opposed suicide bombings and tried to uphold the ceasefire, was regarded as one of Hamas's more moderate and pragmatic leaders. Along with Shanab, three other civilians (his two bodyguards and a 74-year-old man) were killed. The following days it continued with a range of further Israeli killing-attacks. The assassinations of Seeder and Shanab resulted in Hamas calling off the ceasefire with Israel. International criticism of Israel increased because Israel was widely believed to be unwilling to respect the truce.

=== Deadlock ===
In November 2003, the United Nations Security Council endorsed the Roadmap in United Nations Security Council Resolution 1515 which called for an end to all violence including "terrorism, provocation, incitement and destruction". By the end of 2003, the Palestinian Authority had not prevented Palestinian terrorism, and Israel had neither withdrawn from Palestinian areas occupied since 28 September 2000, nor frozen settlement expansion. Thus the requirements of Phase I of the Roadmap were not fulfilled, and the Roadmap did not continue further, reaching deadlock.

== Developments in 2004 ==
In 2004, the peace process was still overshadowed by the Second Intifada, characterized by mutual Palestinian and Israeli violence. Reportedly, some 110 Israelis and 820 Palestinians were killed in the conflict: 40 Israeli military and 67 civilians were killed; some 350 Palestinian militants, 452 civilians and 18 unknown were killed. While a number of the Palestinian militants were killed when carrying out an attack, many were killed in IDF raids on Palestinian neighbourhoods or at arrest attempts.

=== Sharon's announcement of the disengagement plan ===
On 14 April 2004, Prime Minister Sharon wrote a letter to President Bush, in which he reconfirmed his commitment to the Roadmap. He also accused the Palestinian Authority of not carrying out its part of the responsibilities under the Roadmap. Stating that "there exists no Palestinian partner with whom to advance peacefully toward a settlement", Sharon announced his unilateral disengagement plan (Israeli withdrawal from Gaza), which meant the removal of all Israeli settlements from the Gaza Strip and four settlements in the West Bank. The plan was already suggested by him on 18 December 2003 at the Fourth Herzliya Conference.

Although not undertaken under the Roadmap, Sharon declared this unilateral step not inconsistent with it. President Bush gave his support to the plan, calling it "a bold and historic initiative that can make an important contribution to peace".

=== Shifting U.S. position ===
Until 2004, the official U.S. position had been that Israel, in principle, should return to the 1949 armistice lines (the Green Line) and that changes to these lines must be mutually agreed to in final-status negotiations. Israel's ongoing settlement activities were criticised, because they prejudiced final-status negotiations.

In his answer on the 14 April letter from Prime Minister Sharon, President Bush took some distance from this principle. He said "In light of new realities on the ground, including already existing major Israeli population centers, it is unrealistic that the outcome of final status negotiations will be a full and complete return to the armistice lines of 1949 .... It is realistic to expect that any final status agreement will only be achieved on the basis of mutually agreed changes that reflect these realities."

Regarding the Palestinian refugees, President Bush said that "It seems clear that an agreed, just, fair and realistic framework for a solution to the Palestinian refugee issue as part of any final status agreement will need to be found through the establishment of a Palestinian state and the settling of Palestinian refugees there rather than in Israel."

The letter was widely seen as a triumph for Sharon, since President Bush seemed to accept Israel's policy of facts on the ground, the view that the passage of time and new realities (Israeli settlements in the West Bank) obviated Israel's obligation to withdraw more or less to the 1967 lines in return for peace, recognition and security.

In a 26 May 2005 joint press conference with Palestinian leader Mahmoud Abbas in the White House Rose Garden, President Bush said: "Any final status agreement must be reached between the two parties, and changes to the 1949 armistice lines must be mutually agreed to. A viable two-state solution must ensure contiguity of the West Bank, and a state of scattered territories will not work. There must also be meaningful linkages between the West Bank and Gaza. This is the position of the United States today, it will be the position of the United States at the time of final status negotiations."

This statement was widely seen as a triumph for Abbas, as many commentators view it as contradictory to his 14 April 2004 letter. The Bush administration made no attempts to clarify any perceived discrepancies between the two statements.

=== Armed activity and military actions ===
While the Palestinians persisted in violent attacks against Israelis, Israel executed major military operations in Gaza. In 2004, many Israeli civilians were killed in six bomb attacks inside Israel. The Israeli army invaded and besieged southern Gaza in May in Operation Rainbow, invaded and besieged Beit Hanoun in northern Gaza in the summer in a 37 days long raid, and invaded northern Gaza again from 29 September to 16 October in Operation Days of Penitence.

== Reform of the PA structure ==
=== Bush's call for new leaders ===
The Roadmap was based on President Bush's idea that Palestinian terror was the primary obstacle for an Israeli–Palestinian peace agreement, that the Palestinian authorities (PA) were encouraging terrorism, and that the dismantling of the current Palestinian leadership was a prerequisite for a Palestinian state. In his speech of 24 June 2002, Bush said:

Peace requires a new and different Palestinian leadership, so that a Palestinian state can be born. I call on the Palestinian people to elect new leaders, leaders not compromised by terror. ... And when the Palestinian people have new leaders, new institutions and new security arrangements with their neighbors, the United States of America will support the creation of a Palestinian state whose borders and certain aspects of its sovereignty will be provisional until resolved as part of a final settlement in the Middle East. ... Today, Palestinian authorities are encouraging, not opposing, terrorism. ... The Palestinian Authority has rejected your [the Israeli] offer at hand, and trafficked with terrorists.

Israel agreed. It wanted to expel Arafat, but the U.S. opposed. Instead it was suggested to create the post of Prime Minister. In October 2003, the Government declared that "Arafat is the main obstacle for any progress in the Middle East peace process." Prime Minister Ariel Sharon said there is no hope for a political settlement "as long as [Arafat] is around", but he considered expelling Arafat not good for Israel.

=== Introduction of a prime minister ===
Although President Arafat had undertaken significant reform steps since May 2002, the process stalled from March 2003 due to both Israeli measures and internal political factors. In March 2003, President Arafat nominated Mahmoud Abbas for the post of the first prime minister. On 29 April, the Palestinian Parliament approved the appointment of the PM and his new Government. However, a struggle for power between Abbas and Arafat as well as members of the old clique paralysed the new government. Abbas was in a weak position, due to his failing to counter the Israelis, who refused to release prisoners and continued with the occupation of Palestinian cities, settlement activities, assassinations and incursions, and the maintenance of checkpoints. Abbas resigned in September 2003. Also under his successor Ahmed Qurei (Abu Alaa), the needed reform did not appear. An international task force concluded that only general elections could transform the political system, which, however, was impossible under the continued Israeli occupation. After Arafat's death in November 2004, Abbas was elected as the second president of the Palestinian Authority.

=== PA's role towards terror and Israeli reactions ===
The PA was created by the Oslo Accords and set out in detail. The PA was committed to combat Palestinian terror. Yet, its Security Forces were banned from Area C, some 60% of the West Bank, where Israel has exclusive responsibility for security control. Moreover, they were not able to move freely between all parts of the Palestinian controlled areas, which were splintered into more than 160 enclaves within Area C. Nevertheless, Israel held the PA, notably President Arafat, responsible for terrorist attacks committed by militant groups who were not affiliated with him. After two suicide bombings in Israel and Jerusalem executed by Hamas members, the Israeli security Cabinet decided on 11 September 2003 that "Israel will act to remove this obstacle [Arafat] in the manner, at the time, and in the ways that will be decided on separately".

Israel on principle refused to accept cease-fires with militant groups, because "Israel deals only with the Palestinian Authority" and "the Israelis don't deal with these terrorist organizations", while advancing its policy of targeted killing. Instead, Israel reacted on terrorist attacks by attacking the PA's Security Forces and its offices.

When the Second Intifada began, Israel started with the systematic destruction of security service's offices until 90% of them were destroyed by 2003, and about three-quarters of the national security officers were locked up in Israeli detention camps, others were killed. Israeli attacks were mainly concentrated on Palestinian security forces, even though Hamas was responsible for a majority of the bombings and shootings. The siege of Arafat's compound, which started in March 2002 during Operation Defensive Shield was maintained in 2003 and 2004, until Arafat died unexpectedly.

With the destruction of hundreds of PA offices, like the Education Ministry, the Higher Education Ministry and the Health Ministry, along with equipment, computers and dossiers, the IDF wiped out the public data banks, according to Amira Hass apparently to destroy Palestinian civil institutions, sabotaging for years to come the Palestinian goal for independence.

== Expanding West Bank settlement ==
Israel did not withdraw to the positions of 28 September 2000, a key requirement of Phase I of the Roadmap. Instead, movement of Palestinians was heavily impeded by numerous roadblocks, earth mounds and checkpoints, and movement between West Bank and Gaza was virtually impossible. According to Israel, the Palestinians did not fulfil their obligation to end violence and terrorism, and therefore they refused to withdraw.

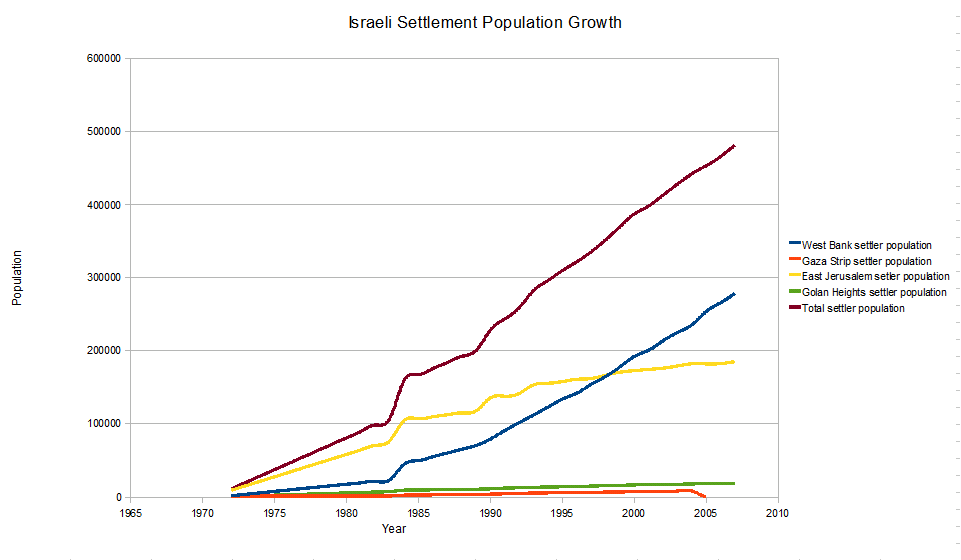
Settler population by year in the Israeli-occupied territories from 1972 to 2007

Israel also did not freeze settlement expansion, nor dismantle outposts built since 2001, another requirement of the Roadmap. Instead, the number of settlers continued growing. Even during the Second Intifada the settler population kept growing at a high rate, in a remarkably straight line. From 2000 to 2004, the number of settlers in the West Bank, including East Jerusalem increased with more than 50,000. From 2004 to 2008, the Jewish population grew with some 70,000. However, the total construction in the settlements from 2004 to 2008 was only 6,868 housing units in the four years.

Additionally, more Palestinian land was confiscated and annexed by means of the expanding West Bank barrier. Despite a ruling of the International Court of Justice, who declared the barrier beyond the Green Line illegal, Israel decided to build the Wall up to 22 km inside the West Bank, east of Ariel, and east of other large settlement blocs. On the other hand, more than 1,500 Palestinian homes were demolished throughout the Palestinian Territories, and build-up of Palestinian structures was virtually completely denied.

== British involvement ==
Until 2003, British intelligence officer Alastair Crooke played an important role as mediator between Israel and the Palestinians. He persuaded both sides to accept ceasefires and truces until he was recalled in August 2003.

According to Crooke, the then British prime minister Tony Blair played an important role in the development of a 2003 MI6 plan for a wide-ranging crackdown on Hamas. It was a "Palestinian Security Plan", drawn up to implement Phase I of the Roadmap. The aim was to stop violent attacks by Hamas, including suicide bombings and the firing of Qassam rockets on South Israel.

The plan also mentioned the Israeli requirements of the Roadmap: "an end to 'deportations, attacks on civilians, confiscation and/or demolition of Palestinian homes and property ... (and) destruction of Palestinian institutions and infrastructure'. To these we would add assassinations and construction of the wall/fence within the Occupied Territories." The document mentions the complaints of the international community about the IDF who destroyed new resources they provided to the Palestinian police force.

In March 2005, MI6 sent a detailed follow-up of the Palestinian Security Plan. This report notes that the NSF (Palestinian National Security Forces), who were assigned to prevent terror, were denied equipment, ammunition, and freedom of movement by the Israelis.

After Tony Blair sent British Intelligence officers to the Gaza Strip, in August 2005, to persuade Palestinian terrorists to call a halt to their suicide bomb attacks against Israel, Israel sent a sharp protest to the UK, because it opposed dealing with Hamas.

When in March 2006 Hamas won the parliamentary elections, Israel and the international community would not accept a role for the political arm of Hamas until it renounced violence and recognized Israel. As Hamas attacks and kidnappings continued, many Hamas leaders and politicians were detained by Israel, or assassinated by targeted killing. In June 2007, Hamas took control of Gaza in the Fatah–Hamas battle.

== Roadmap in the peace process ==
In the Sharm el-Sheikh Summit on 8 February 2005, Israelis and Palestinians reconfirmed their commitment to the Roadmap. At the Annapolis Conference on 27 November 2007, both parties again expressed their commitment to the Roadmap. Despite intensive negotiations in the following months, the parties did not reach an agreement. The negotiations ended in September 2008 without result. When the Olmert government started a major assault on Gaza in December 2008 to stop rocket fire into Israel, dubbed Operation Cast Lead, the peace process completely collapsed.

After the end of President Bush's term of office in January 2009, the Roadmap fell into the background. The main issues remained: the permanent status of the occupied territories in the West Bank, the ongoing expansion of the settlements, Palestinian terrorism, and the final borders of Israel.

== See also ==
- One State Solution
- Elon Peace Plan
- List of Middle East peace proposals
