= Eyal Eizenberg =

Israeli Ground Forces officer

- איל איזנברג
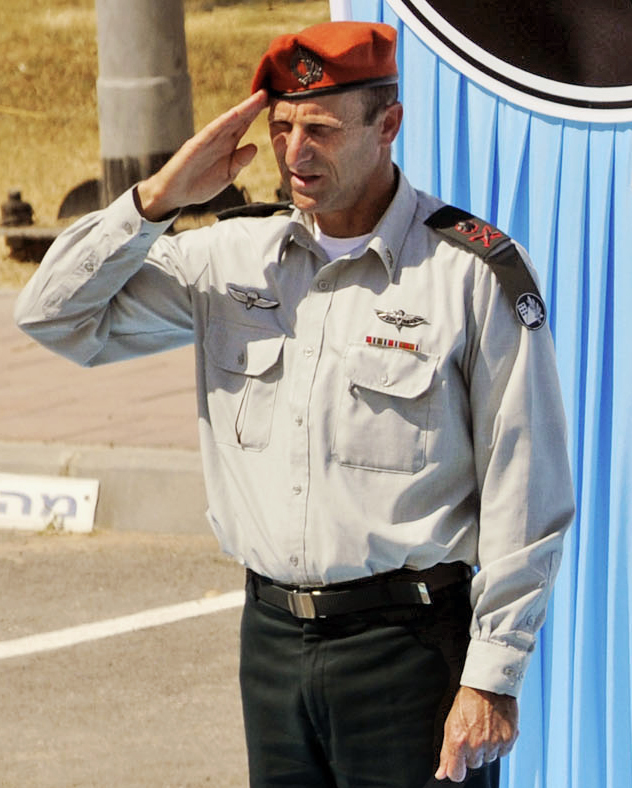
- Born: 1963 (age 62–63); Kfar Bialik, Israel
- Military career
- Allegiance: Israel
- Branch: Israeli Ground Forces
- Service years: 1981–2015
- Rank: Aluf (Major General) (res.)
- Commands: Gaza Division, Home Front Command
- Conflicts: 1982-2000 South Lebanon conflict, Second Intifada (Operation Days of Penitence, Operation Rainbow), 2006 Lebanon War, 2008–2009 Israel–Gaza conflict

Aluf Eyal Eizenberg (Hebrew: איל איזנברג; born 1963) is a former general in the Israel Defense Forces; his last position was the head of IDF Home Front Command. He led the Israel Defense Forces (IDF) Gaza Division during the 2008–2009 Israel–Gaza conflict.

== Military career ==
Eizenberg was born in Kfar Bialik in 1963. He began his military service in the Israel Defense Forces in 1981, as a cadet in the Israel Air Force (IAF) Flight School. He did not complete his pilot training, and moved to the Air Force's Shaldag commando unit, where he became a company commander. He then joined the Givati Brigade as commander of the Brigade's Samson's Foxes Reconnaissance company, and later as the commander of its Shaked battalion. He returned to the Shaldag Unit as its commander, a post he held from 1996- 1999. He was promoted to the rank of colonel, and commanded the Eastern Brigade of Lebanon Liaison Unit during Israel's withdrawal from the security zone it held in Lebanon in 2000. Subsequently he commanded a reserve paratrooper brigade, before returning to Givati Brigade as its commander, in 2003-2005. He led the brigade during Operation Days of Penitence, and according to Human Rights Watch, he was one of the key Israeli decision-makers in the Gaza Strip during Operation Rainbow in May 2004. In November 2005 he assumed command of the 98th Paratroopers Division, and led it during the 2006 Lebanon War. Though the performance of his division in the war was criticized by the Winograd Commission, he was the only one of the four divisional commanders that participated in the war who continued to serve in the army after the war, advancing in the ranks. His appointment as commander of the Gaza Division was harshly criticized, due to the perceived failure of the division under his command in the Lebanon war.

Eizenberg replaced Moshe Tamir as commander of the Gaza Division on 19 November 2008. The handing over of command was postponed due to a surge in tensions around Gaza.

Eyal Eizenberg was reprimanded on February 2, 2010 for the authorization of an artillery attack which hit a UN compound in Tel El Hawa on. During the attack on 15 January 2009 the compound was set ablaze by white phosphorus shells. The Israel Defense Forces did not say what form of discipline Eizenberg faces, but that he was accused of "exceeding his authority in a manner that jeopardised the lives of others" during the shelling of Tel al-Hawa during the Israel Defense Forces' Operation Cast Lead on January 15, 2009.

On June 15, 2011, Eizenberg was appointed head of the Home Front Command and retired during 2015.

== Personal life ==
Eizenberg is married and the father of 3 children. He lives in a moshav in central Israel.
