= 2004 Beit Hanoun raid =

Israel Defense Force raid in the Gaza Strip

Between 29 June and 5 August 2004, the Israel Defense Forces (IDF) conducted a raid on Beit Hanoun, a Palestinian town in the northern Gaza Strip. The stated goal of The 37-day-long invasion and siege, called Operation Forward Shield by Israel, was to prevent future rocket attacks from Gaza following the deaths of two residents of the Israeli town of Sderot on 28 June.

Nineteen or twenty Palestinians were killed in the raid, including six children, and about 70 houses were destroyed.

== Background ==
On 28 June 2004, two residents of the Israeli town of Sderot were killed in a rocket attack by Palestinian militants firing from inside the occupied Gaza Strip. Following these deaths, the Israel Defense Forces (IDF) conducted a raid, which they called "Operation Forward Shield", on Beit Hanoun, a Palestinian town in the north-eastern Gaza Strip. The stated goal of the raid was to prevent future rocket attacks from the Gaza Strip. The operation, which occurred ahead of the planned unilateral withdrawal from Gaza, was preceded by Operation Rainbow and followed by Operation Days of Penitence.

== Raid ==
The raid started around midnight of 28/29 June 2004 with a direct attack on the offices of local and international media. Four missiles were launched from an attack helicopter on a structure the IDF said was used by the Hamas terrorist organization in Gaza City. " It was described as a "communications center which maintained constant contact with terrorists", and distributed "incitement material" from Hamas. Human Rights Watch and Palestinian Centre for Human Rights (PCHR) said it was an attempt to silence local Palestinian media. The Committee to Protect Journalists wrote a letter to Prime Minister Ariel Sharon, expressing concern.

At about 5 am on 29 June 2004, the IDF deployed its forces around Beit Hanoun, attacking it and neighbouring areas with tanks and helicopters. On 3 August, the IDF expanded the operation further west with tanks and other armoured vehicles. For 37 days, civilian movement into, out of and within the town was banned. The IDF began its redeployment on 5 August at 1 am.

=== Casualties and damage ===
During the raid, 19 or 20 Palestinians were killed, including 6 children.

=== Damage ===
The operation caused large-scale damage and destruction to property and infrastructure through the use of tanks and bulldozers. According to PCHR, 70 houses were destroyed. The Gaza-based Al Mezan Center for Human Rights reported 33 destroyed homes. Schools, health facilities, kindergartens, mosques, factories, workshops, sewerage pumps and security posts were also damaged, as was infrastructure, such as water supply, electricity and roads. Sixteen water-wells were destroyed.Many orchards and livestock farms were damaged, and 2,600–4,000 dunams of agricultural land was bulldozed.

=== Violation of international law ===
According to PCHR, the IDF was also accused of obstructing medical assistance, as a result of which a number of Palestinians died. A further claim is that ambulances, clinics, medical centres and medical crews were fired at and personnel threatened.

Al Mezan reported that the IDF occupied 36 homes. In one case, inhabitants were held inside the house and used as human shields.

Al Mezan claimed that this constituted collective punishment and called it a breach of international humanitarian law, especially the 1949 Fourth Geneva Convention.

== See also ==
- Operation Autumn Clouds, 2006
