= 2006 shelling of Beit Hanoun =

2006 Israeli attack on the Gaza Strip

- Part of the 2006 Israeli operation in Beit Hanoun
- Date: 8 November 2006
- Location: Beit Hanoun, Gaza Strip
- Organized by: Israel Defense Forces
- Outcome: Formal apology by the Israeli government
- Deaths: 19+
- Injuries: 40+

The 2006 shelling of Beit Hanoun by the Israeli Defence Force (IDF) happened on 8 November, when shells hit a row of houses in the Gaza Strip town of Beit Hanoun, killing at least 19 Palestinians and wounding more than 40. The shelling followed the IDF's withdrawal from the Gaza Strip in completion of a week-long operation codenamed Operation "Autumn Clouds", which the Israeli government stated had been intended to stop the Qassam rocket attacks on Israeli civilians by Palestinian militants. The Israeli government apologized and attributed the incident to a technical malfunction.

== Incident ==
Early in the morning of 8 November 2006, Israeli artillery shelled a densely built-up area in Beit Hanoun, striking a building where an extended family was sleeping. Nineteen people were killed, mostly women and children, 13 belonging to the same family, and 40 others were wounded. Israel stated that the shelling was in response to a Qassam rocket attack from that location, a day earlier, possibly from a car driven into the area. According to the Israeli military, the artillery had misfired due to a malfunction of the guidance system. It did not clarify why the shelling occurred a full day after the firing of the Qassam,

=== Palestinian response ===
- Palestinian National Authority – The Palestinian prime minister, Hamas's Ismail Haniyeh, stated the attack was an "awful massacre". Palestinian president Mahmoud Abbas described it as an "...ugly massacre committed by the occupation against our children, our women and elderly...you (the Israelis) do not want peace at all..."
- Palestinians in Beit Hanoun marched in anger the next day and bore for cameras the battered faces of two of the dead children.

=== Israeli response ===
- Israeli Government – Prime Minister Ehud Olmert expressed regret over the killings and offered humanitarian assistance to the wounded. In his address to the UN Security Council, Israel's deputy UN representative Daniel Carmon reiterated Israel's "deep sorrow and regret" over the accidental killing of innocent civilians, and told the council that terrorism by Hamas was to blame for "the incident in Beit Hanoun". "If Palestinian terror did not continue to assault Israelis, if Qassam rockets stopped sailing out of Gaza into Israel, the incident in Beit Hanoun would never have happened," Carmon said. "A single decision is needed: The Palestinian Authority government must decide to stop using terrorism as a means to achieving its goals." At a business conference in Tel Aviv, Prime Minister Olmert said, "I am very uncomfortable with this event. I'm very distressed." Olmert called it a "mistake" caused by "technical failure," and he urged Palestinian President Mahmoud Abbas to meet with him immediately. Israeli organizations, including Peace Now and Gush Shalom and political parties Meretz and Hadash held a protest in Tel Aviv shortly after news of the killings broke. Israeli human rights group B'Tselem described the policy of returning fire to the general area from which a rocket attack is launched a "war crime."

== United Nations investigation ==
On 15 November 2006, the United Nations Human Rights Council adopted resolution S-3/1 which called for a fact-finding mission, consisting of Archbishop Desmond Tutu and Professor Christine Chinkin of the United Kingdom to travel to Beit Hanoun. The resolution was accepted by a wide margin, with only seven countries opposing and six abstaining.

In reaction to the resolution, the Foreign Affairs Minister of Israel released a statement noting that Israel had already expressed regret regarding the incident, decrying the UN's "ignoring of the ongoing terrorism against Israeli civilians by the Palestinian terrorist organizations", and expecting the UN "to show a more balanced and fairer approach toward Israel and not to automatically adopt any notion from those whose only desire is to discredit Israel."

On three occasions, the mission attempted to travel to Beit Hanoun via Israel. Each of these attempts was frustrated by the refusal of the Government of Israel to cooperate with the mission. The mission finally visited Beit Hanoun from 27 to 29 May 2008.

In its final report, the mission concluded that "[I]n the absence of a well-founded explanation from the Israeli military – who is in sole possession of the relevant facts – the mission must conclude that there is a possibility that the shelling of Beit Hanoun constituted a war crime."

Tutu has vigorously protested the overall response to the incident: "The right to life has been violated not just through the killings [in Beit Hanoun], but also through the lack of an adequate investigation of the killings."

== Aftermath ==
Andrew Exum has stated that the Israeli military had a "long history of mistakes causing many civilian casualties." About the 2006 shelling, he said that: "it was found it was caused by a faulty programming card in a counter-battery radar system, called Shilem, designed to track an enemy projectile's trajectory back to its point of origin and direct artillery fire back at that spot. The inquiry also found that the artillery crew had not recalibrated their weapons overnight and did not have spotters monitoring whether their fire was accurate, so 12 to 15 artillery shells were fired before it was realised they were hitting an apartment complex. It is not clear what changes the IDF made to its targeting methods as a result."

=== International response ===
- Amnesty International described the killing as an appalling act and called for an immediate, independent investigation. It said the Israeli investigation had been seriously inadequate and failed to meet international standards.
- Arab League secretary general Amr Moussa said "These massacres of children, women and civilians are unjustified and incomprehensible and unexpected. Israeli policies in the Palestinian territories have gone too far."
- Speaking on behalf of the European Union, Finland's UN ambassador Kirsti Lintonen recognized Israel's "legitimate right to self-defense" but urged Israel to "exercise utmost restraint" and underlined that "action should not be disproportionate or in contradiction to international law." "We call on Israel to end its incursion in Gaza," she added, while pressing Palestinian leaders to put an end to the firing of rockets on Israeli territory.
- Italian Foreign Minister Massimo D'Alema suggested that the strike was a deliberate action by the Israeli government to stop Hamas from forming a government of national unity in the Palestinian territories. He told his party's newspaper L'Unita, "What happened in Beit Hanoun is a result of political choices."
- Russian Foreign ministry officials urged "both sides to stop the bloodbath – by ending these attacks, whose victims are totally innocent people, and taking urgent measures to stabilise the situation and restart political dialogue."
- Syrian foreign ministry officials called the incident a "savage attack", "a challenge to the international community" that "must be vehemently condemned." Syria also asked the UN Security Council to stop "massacres" committed by Israel and punish it for its "repeated crimes."
- Turkish foreign ministry officials described it as a "disproportionate and indiscriminate use of force" that will lead into indefinite postponement of peaceful co-existence between Israelis and the Palestinians.
- United Kingdom Foreign Secretary Margaret Beckett said: "It is hard to see what this action was meant to achieve and how it can be justified... Israel must respect its obligation to avoid harming civilians."
- United States Ambassador John Bolton said that while Washington deeply regretted the loss of Palestinian lives, it also believed that Israel has the right "to defend itself and the lives of its citizens".

== See also ==
- Israeli war crimes
