= 2003 Shmuel HaNavi bus bombing =

2003 suicide bombing in Jerusalem

Shmuel HaNavi bus bombing
- Part of the Second Intifada militancy campaign
- The attack site
- Native name: הפיגוע בקו 2
- Location: 31°47′40″N 35°13′15″E; Jerusalem
- Date: August 19, 2003; 23 years ago
- Attack type: Suicide bombing
- Deaths: 23 civilians and 1 unborn child (+1 bomber)
- Injuries: 130+ civilians
- Perpetrator: Hamas claimed responsibility

On August 19, 2003, Palestinian militant Raed Abdel Hamid Misk, sent by the Hamas cell in Hebron, dressed as a Haredi Jew, boarded a crowded bus with Orthodox Jewish children returning from the Western Wall, and conducted a suicide bombing in the Shmuel HaNavi quarter in Jerusalem. Twenty-three civilians and 1 unborn child were killed, and over 130 were wounded. Many of the victims were children, some of them infants.

== Attack ==
On August 19, 2003 (22 Av 5763), a Hamas suicide bomber sent out by the organization's Hebron cell disguised himself as a Haredi Jew and detonated himself on a No. 2 Egged bus traveling through Jerusalem's Shmuel HaNavi neighborhood. He blew himself up after entering the back door. The double-length bus was crowded with Orthodox Jewish children returning from a visit to the Western Wall. In addition to the perpetrator, the huge explosion killed 7 children and 16 adults, among them Lilach Kardi who was eight months' pregnant, and injured more than 130 people. The bomb was spiked with ball-bearings designed to increase injuries on the crowded bus. Hamas said the bomber was a 29-year-old mosque preacher from the city of Hebron.

The people killed were:

- Avraham Bar-Or, 12, of Jerusalem
- Binyamin Bergman, 15, of Jerusalem
- Yaakov Binder, 50, of Jerusalem
- Feiga Dushinski, 50, of Jerusalem
- Miriam Eisenstein, 20, of Bnei Brak
- Lilach Kardi, 22, of Jerusalem
- Menachem Leibel, 24, of Jerusalem
- Elisheva Meshulami, 16, of Bnei Brak
- Tehilla Nathanson, 3, of Zichron Ya'acov
- Chava Nechama Rechnitzer, 19, of Bnei Brak
- Mordechai Reinitz, 49, and Issachar Reinitz, 9, of Netanya
- Maria Antonia Reslas, 39, of the Philippines
- Liba Schwartz, 54, of Jerusalem
- Hanoch Segal, 65, of Bnei Brak
- Goldie Taubenfeld, 43, and Shmuel Taubenfeld, 3 months, of New Square, New York
- Rabbi Eliezer Weisfish, 42, of Jerusalem
- Shmuel Wilner, 50, of Jerusalem
- Shmuel Zargari, 11 months, of Jerusalem.
- Fruma Rahel Weitz, 73, of Jerusalem, died of her wounds on August 23.
- Mordechai Laufer, 27, of Netanya, died of his wounds on September 5.
- Tova Lev, 37, of Bnei-Brak, died of her wounds on September 12.

Because so many of the dead and injured were children, the media dubbed it the "children's bus". According to an Associated Press report,

Strollers were scattered near the stricken bus, medics carried away children with blood-smeared faces and a baby girl died in a hospital before doctors could find her parents. At least five children were among the 18 dead in Tuesday's suicide bombing by a Palestinian militant who blew himself up on a Jerusalem bus. Forty children were among more than 100 people injured. The attack was the 100th Palestinian suicide bombing against Israelis since the latest round of fighting began in September 2000. The youth of the victims stands out in that grim list, and the government said the choice of target was particularly cold-blooded.

== Perpetrators ==
Both Hamas and Islamic Jihad claimed responsibility for the attack.

The Izz ad-Din al-Qassam Brigades of Hamas claimed responsibility for the operation and named 29-year old Hebron resident Raed Abdel Hamid Misk (kunya Abu al-Mu'min) as the perpetrator. According to the Brigades, Misk was born in Hebron on 24 January 1974 and educated at Al-Jazair School and the Sharia School for Boys. He was first arrested by Israel in 1989 and spent a year in Israeli jails.

To execute the operation, Misk disguised himself as a Jew, and boarded the double-decker bus after it had left Al-Buraq Square. At 9pm, he detonated a bomb and killed 25 people.

== Aftermath ==
The attack put an end to the so-called Hudna that had been announced in July 2003.

Israeli forces arrested 17 Palestinians suspected of being Hamas activists, including several of the bomber's relatives, while Hamas leader Ismail Abu Shanab and his two bodyguards were killed by an Israeli helicopter missile strike in Gaza.

In 2004 a memorial plaque to the victims was erected in the Beit Yisrael neighborhood of Jerusalem. The name of the only non-Jewish victim, Maria Antonia Reslas, was engraved separately from the names of the other victims, with the title "Mrs" rather than the title "sainted" (kadosh) used for the Jews, resulting in some controversy.

=== Reactions ===
United States president George W. Bush sent his condolences to the victims' families. The European Commission also denounced what it called the "devastating terrorist attack" and called on the Palestinian Authority to intervene to bring a halt to such acts:

The European Commission strongly condemns last night's devastating terrorist attack in Jerusalem and expresses its sincere condolences to the families of the victims and to the Israeli Government. This is an attack on all the forces working for peace. The European Commission calls on the Palestinian Authority to do everything in its powers to prevent such unacceptable and unjustified act of violence, and urges the PA and the Israeli Government to pursue their dialogue and common efforts towards peace as set out in the Road Map.

== See also ==
- Dizengoff Center suicide bombing
- Israeli casualties of war
- Kiryat Menachem bus bombing
- Patt junction bus bombing
- Palestinian political violence
