= 2004 Israeli operation in Rafah =

Military offensive in the Gaza strip

Coordinates: 31.291°N 34.244°E

Operation Rainbow
- Part of the Second Intifada
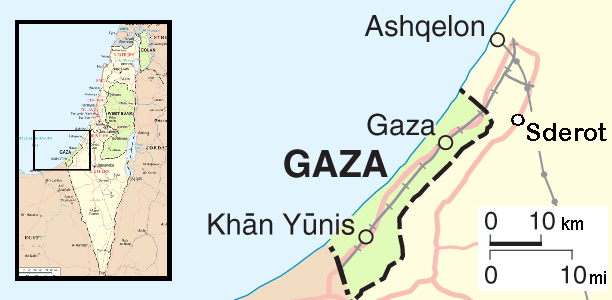
- Area of the conflict
Date	12 May – 1 June 2004 (2 weeks and 6 days)
Location	Gaza Strip
Result	Israeli withdrawal

Belligerents
Israel (IDF)	Hamas; Palestinian Islamic Jihad; Popular Resistance Committees

Commanders and leaders
Brig. Gen. Shmuel Zakkai	Unknown

Casualties and losses
13 soldiers killed	53–55 Palestinians killed Combatants: 41 killed (IDF claim), 12 (Palestinians claim); Civilians: 12 (IDF claim), 43 (Palestinians claim)

In 2004, the Israel Defense Forces (IDF) launched Operation Rainbow in Cloud (Hebrew: מבצע קשת בענן, romanized: Mivtza Keshet Be-Anan) in the southern Gaza Strip on 12–24 May 2004, involving an invasion and siege of Rafah. The operation was started after the deaths of eleven Israeli soldiers in two Palestinian attacks, in which M113 armored vehicles were attacked.

Human Rights Watch reported 59 Palestinians killed during 12–24 May, including 11 under age eighteen and 18 armed men. The IDF razed some 300 homes to expand the buffer zone along the Egypt–Gaza border, expanding it far inside the Gaza Strip. Also, a zoo and at least 700 dunams (70 ha) of agricultural land were destroyed.

Israel's declared aims of Operation Rainbow were finding and destroying smuggling tunnels, targeting terrorists, and securing the Philadelphi Route by expanding the buffer zone.

== Background ==
In response to a repeated shelling of Israeli communities with Qassam rockets and mortar shells from Gaza, the IDF operated mainly in Rafah – to search and destroy smuggling tunnels used by militants to obtain weapons, ammunition, fugitives, cigarettes, car parts, electrical goods, foreign currency, gold, drugs, and cloth from Egypt. The IDF launched a series of armored raids on the Gaza Strip (mainly Rafah and refugee camps around Gaza). On 22 March 2004, an Israeli helicopter gunship killed Hamas leader Sheikh Ahmed Yassin and on 17 April, Abdel Aziz al-Rantissi was killed by IDF helicopter gunship strike.

=== Buffer zone ===
Since 2001, the IDF has routinely demolished Palestinian houses in Rafah, to create a buffer zone. Persons entering or approaching the buffer zone, including humanitarian workers, foreign dignitaries and UN observers came under fire. Until 2000, the IDF used a 20–40 meter wide buffer zone along the Gaza/Egypt border with a 2.5 to 3 meters high concrete wall topped with barbed wire. In 2002, the IDF destroyed hundreds of houses in Rafah, needed for expansion of the buffer zone and the building of an eight meter high and 1.6 kilometers long metal wall along the border. The wall also extends two meters underground. The wall is built some eighty to ninety meters from the border, which doubled the width of the patrol corridor. After the metal wall was completed in early 2003, the demolitions continued and were even increased dramatically. According to Human Rights Watch, the wall was built far inside the demolished area to create a new starting point for justifying further demolitions. Between 1 April 2003 and 30 April 2004, 487 more houses were demolished in Rafah.

In May 2004, the Israeli government approved a plan to further expand the buffer zone. The Israeli military recommended demolishing all homes within three hundred meters of its positions, or about four hundred meters from the border.

Human rights group PCHR recorded 290 destroyed houses in Rafah in May 2004. According to UNWRA, the total number of house buildings destroyed by the IDF in May 2004 was some 298. 131 homes were destroyed between 1 and 10 May, already before the Government's decision; some 100 houses between 14 and 16 May (Human Rights Watch mentions several rows of houses on 12 May and quotes 88 to 116 between 14 and 16 May).

According to HRW, the IDF's justifications for the destruction were doubtful and rather consistent with the goal of having a wide and empty border area to facilitate long-term control over the Gaza Strip.

== Aims of the operation ==
Initially, the operation just started as a response on the death of five soldiers in the Philadelphi corridor on 12 May 2004; on 13 May, the Israeli government reportedly approved a plan to widen the Philadelphi Route by destroying "dozens or perhaps hundreds" of homes.

On 17 May, the IDF launched "Operation Rainbow" with the objectives: finding and destroying smuggling tunnels, targeting "terrorists", and securing the Philadelphi Route. On 18 May, rumours were spread about arms shipments in the Sinai from Iran, waiting to be smuggled through the tunnels into Gaza. Israeli media mentioned anti-aircraft missiles and long-range rockets waiting to get in, possibly via tunnels underneath the Suez canal. Justice Minister Yosef Lapid said on 20 May that the Rafah operation was necessary to protect Israeli civilian airliners from anti-aircraft missiles that smugglers were attempting to bring into Rafah. No captures of such weapons are known, and a high-ranking Egyptian official interviewed by Human Rights Watch denied the existence of the shipment.

Many saw the assault on Rafah as excessive, and mainly motivated by an IDF desire to appear strong in the event of disengagement.

== The operation ==
=== Preceding military actions ===
On May 11 and May 12, two M-113 armoured personnel carriers, one of Givati's Dolev combat engineering company and of the Combat Engineering Corps "Tunnels' Team", were destroyed by Palestinian militants. The two separate attacks, in Gaza City's Zeitoun neighbourhood and the Philadelphi Route near Rafah and the Egyptian border, claimed the lives of 11 IDF soldiers. Soon, Israeli troops entered the buffer zone to recover body parts of the dead soldiers. In the evening, the IDF attacked Rafah with tanks and helicopter gunships, firing shells and missiles as residents fled. Several rows of houses were demolished.

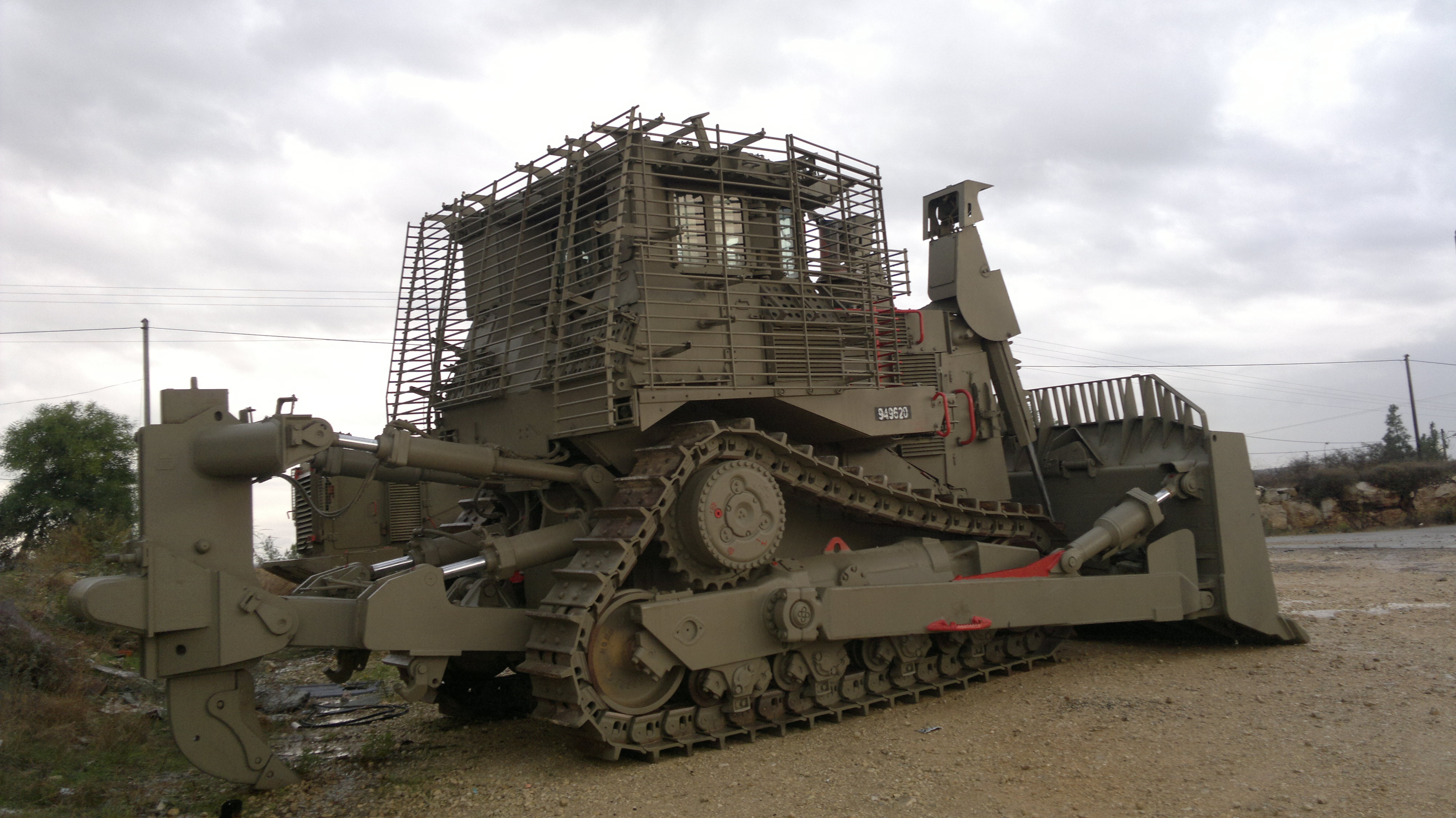
Caterpillar Bulldozer as used by the IDF to demolish homes

On 14 May, a large IDF force entered the "Brazil block" of Rafah and in a heavy fighting, as reported by UNWRA, 12 Palestinians were killed and 52 injured. Israeli forces began demolishing houses in the Qishta neighborhood. and destroyed scores of houses. Around midnight the same day, the Israeli High Court of Justice issued an interim order temporarily barring the IDF from demolishing homes in the refugee camp, if the action was not part of "a regular military operation". Nevertheless, the IDF continued the destruction of homes until 15 May 5:00 am because of "immediate military necessity, a risk to soldiers, or a hindrance to a military operation", raising the number of destroyed houses to just over 100, according to Mezan, even to circa 120.

On 16 May, the High Court ruled that the IDF may destroy homes according to their needs; the IDF had pledged that it would refrain from unnecessarily demolishing houses. The ruling caused panic among the residents and hundreds of Palestinians fled from their homes. Israeli helicopters fired missiles on the office of the weekly newspaper al-Resala in Gaza City, destroying its offices. The next day, Israel started "Operation Rainbow".

=== Operation Rainbow ===
In the morning of 17 May 2004, the Israel army launched "Operation Rainbow". At 1 pm, the IDF closed the only road between Rafah and Khan Yunis and initiated a total siege. Armoured vehicles, main battle tanks and armoured bulldozers entered Rafah from the east through the Sofa Crossing, effectively cutting off Rafah from the rest of the Gaza Strip.

The next day before dawn, the army surrounded Tel al-Sultan. Armoured vehicles, tanks and bulldozers supported by helicopter gunships entered the Tel al-Sultan quarter of Rafah simultaneously from several directions; the troops established a cordon around the area and separated the area from the rest of Rafah. A number of armoured vehicles entered through UNRWA schools in the southeastern part, causing extensive damage to the school grounds. Ambulances were prevented from evacuating the casualties out of fear that they would be hijacked by terrorists. Palestinians were prevented from accessing UNRWA's health clinic in the area. An ambulance was fired at. When a convoy of four ambulances accompanied by a Reuters vehicle were sent, they were also fired at. When they arrived at the victim, Israeli soldiers continued to fire. Israeli IDF Caterpillar D9 armoured bulldozers erected sand-barriers around Rafah to isolate it. Later, the D9s entered into the Rafah in order to open routes and demolish houses, allegedly used by militants. Extensive damage was caused to roads, water and sewage pipes and agricultural areas with greenhouses.

Under pressure of sharp international criticism, the Israel government declared on 18 May that the plan to widen a buffer zone along the Egyptian border was cancelled, while the same day, the army massively invaded Rafah and continued its large-scale destruction. The next day, the United Nations Security Council adopted "Resolution 1544", condemning the killing of Palestinian civilians and the demolition of homes.

On 19 May, the IDF ordered all males in Tel al-Sultan aged 16 years and above to gather at an UNRWA school and carried out house-to-house searches. An IDF tank fired four tank shells and a helicopter fired a missile on a group of demonstrating residents in Tel al-Sultan, killing 9 Palestinians and injuring 40–50 others. The IDF asserted there were gunmen in the crowd, although it did not claim to have come under fire. The IDF claimed that the shelling was intended as a warning to deter protesters and was not meant to cause casualties. IDF snipers used abandoned houses as firing positions. Many houses were damaged or destroyed. Israeli snipers shot at suspected militants who claimed they were civilians looking for water. The gunfire claimed the life of a Palestinian teen.

On 20 May the IDF entered the "Brazil", "As-Salam" and "Junena" areas of eastern Rafah and sealed off the areas. In some cases, water and electricity were cut off during the operation. Tens of homes were demolished in Brazil and As Salam without warning. Some Palestinians claimed that the IDF commenced the demolitions when they were still in their homes.

A testimony describes attacks on an ambulance: When the ambulance arrived at al-Brazil to pick up a woman and her three wounded children, Israeli tanks fired. With bulldozers and tanks, the ambulance was surrounded. A bulldozer started to place sand barriers in front of the ambulance, while another bulldozer was demolishing houses and putting the ruins behind the ambulance to lock it in. When the medical workers tried to leave the car, Israeli tanks fired. After 3 hours, the army started to remove the barriers and the ambulance returned, without the wounded civilians.

On 21 May, the Rafah zoo adjacent to the "Brazil" section of the Rafah refugee camp was destroyed during the operation. Some 60 homes were demolished and 35 others partially destroyed. also greenhouses and equipment were destroyed. The IDF withdrew their main forces from the center of Tel al-Sultan and the curfew was lifted.

On 22 and 23 May, a new incursion into the Brazil district took place. The IDF ordered all males in Abu Halaweh aged 16 years and above to gather and carried out house-to-house searches and demolitions. The IDF deliberately demolished two houses with the family who refused to leave inside. A soldier entered a house with a Palestinian as human shield. In Tel al-Sultan, the IDF destroyed with bulldozers and tanks two large agricultural areas full of greenhouses.

During the early hours of 24 May, Israeli forces withdrew completely from Tel al-Sultan, but remained present in the Brazil area until the end of the month. About 40 homes were destroyed from early in the morning until 6 pm.

On 1 June the operation officially ended. Surprisingly, the IDF choose to invade areas where armed resistance was limited, apparently to minimize confrontation with armed groups.

== Destruction of the Rafah zoo ==
On 21 May the Israeli army completely destroyed the Rafah zoo, nearly 800 meters from the Egypt–Gaza border.

The IDF said they had destroyed the zoo while en route to another objective and because an alternate route had been booby-trapped. According to Human Rights Watch, the deliberate and time-consuming nature of the destruction, the seizure of the four-story Juma’ house, and the stationing of several tanks there for over a day means that it was not an action en route, but rather part of enforcing a cordon. The Guardian alleged that the IDF evolved the explanation of its actions. Mohammed Juma also accused Israeli soldiers of stealing valuable African parrots.

== Accusations of human rights violations ==
Al Mezan reported grave human rights violations. Many Palestinian civilians were killed. Many homes were destroyed or damaged. Medical services were obstructed, ambulances attacked, dead bodies could not be collected. Humanitarian assistance was denied. Large-scale wilful destruction of properties was reported; properties were stolen, soldiers urinated on mattresses and furniture. Civilians were systematically used as human shields. According to Al Mezan, the use as human shield was common use in such Israeli operations.

== Results ==
=== Casualties ===
From 12 to 15 May the IDF reportedly killed nine Palestinian civilians and six fighters. Eleven IDF soldiers died on 12–13 May, later during the military operation two Israeli soldiers were killed and two more wounded. Al Mezan reported 15 killed Palestinians, all from missile attacks on 14 and 15 May, and at least 44 Palestinians during Operation Rainbow, making a total of at least 59.

The IDF reportedly killed 32 Palestinian civilians, of whom 10 under age eighteen, as well as 12 armed fighters. Based on a variety of reports, accounts and statements, Human Rights Watch reported 59 Palestinians killed during 12–24 May, including 11 under age eighteen and 18 armed men.

According to the IDF, 41 militants and 12 civilians were killed during the operation, where some of the civilians were killed by Palestinian fire. During the operation, from 18 May to 25 May, no Israeli soldier was killed.

=== Damage ===
Pictures from Rafah showed a devastated city. Due to the use of armored bulldozers and tanks, extensive damage was caused to schools, roads, water and sewage pipes and agricultural areas with greenhouses, resulting in floods and risk of disease. At least 700 dunams (70 ha) of agricultural land were destroyed.

As of 23 May 2004 one smuggling tunnel had been found, which according to the Israeli army was 25 feet deep and contained explosives.

According to UN relief agency UNRWA, the IDF destroyed 45 buildings during the operation and 155 buildings in Rafah over the past month. Human rights groups estimated that the army had demolished some 170–180 buildings in Rafah, including some 300 homes. About 2,000 people became homeless in Operation Rainbow. According to Human Rights Watch, during 12–24 May, 254 houses were destroyed, leaving nearly 3,800 people homeless, and 44 another houses in the Rafah area during the same month in other operations.

== Aftermath ==
On 29 June 2004, Israel started an invasion of Beit Hanoun. On 29 September, after a Qassam rocket hit the Israeli town of Sderot and killed two Israeli children, the IDF launched an invasion of the north of the Gaza Strip. The operation's stated aim was to remove the threat of Qassam rockets from Sderot. The operation ended on 16 October, leaving widespread destruction and some 130 Palestinians dead.

== See also ==
- List of invasions in the 21st century
- Israeli casualties of war
- Palestinian rocket attacks on Israel
