= Kunya, Russia =

Kunya (Russian: Кунья) is the name of several inhabited localities in Russia.

== Modern localities ==
Urban localities

- Kunya, Pskov Oblast, a work settlement in Kunyinsky District of Pskov Oblast

Rural localities

- Kunya, Perm Krai, a village under the administrative jurisdiction of the town of krai significance of Dobryanka in Perm Krai

== Alternative names ==
- Kunya, alternative name of Kunyi Vyselki, a village in Mochilskoye Rural Settlement of Serebryano-Prudsky District in Moscow Oblast; 54°17′N 38°41′E
