= Beit Hanoun =

Palestinian city in the Gaza Strip

Beit Hanoun بيت حانون
- Municipality type A (City)

Arabic transcription(s)
  - Arabic: بيت حانون
  - Latin: Beit Hanun (official); Bayt Hanun (unofficial)
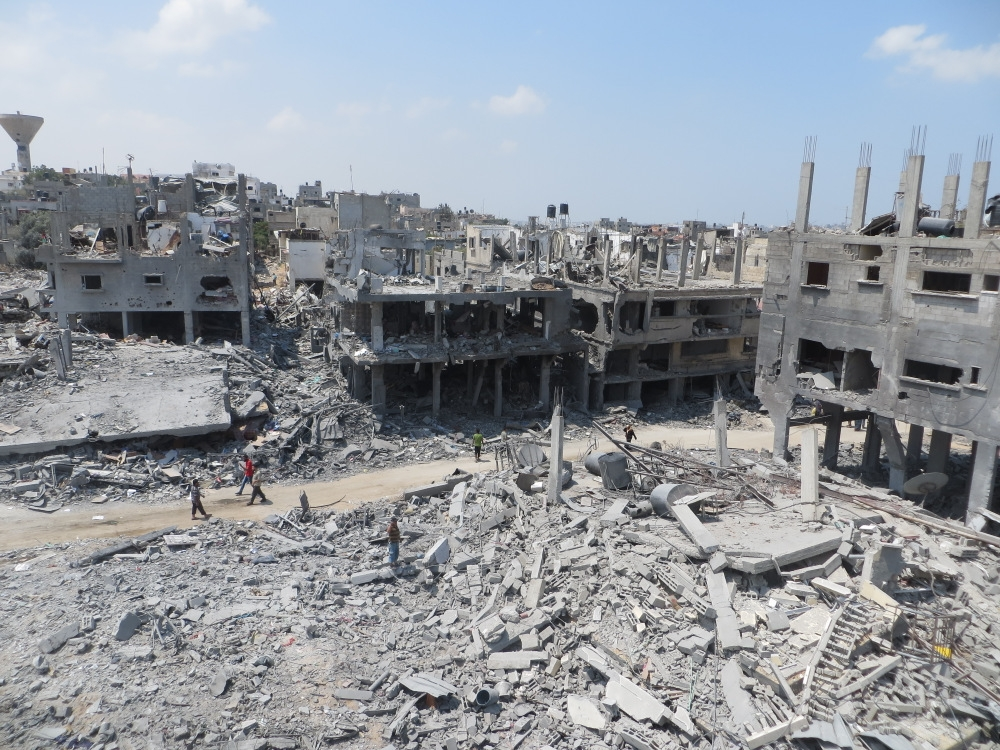
- Ruins of Beit Hanoun in 2014, after Israeli bombing

- Municipal Seal of Beit Hanoun
- Interactive map of Beit Hanoun
- Location of Beit Hanoun within Palestine
- Coordinates: 31°32′19″N 34°32′14″E
- Palestine grid: 105/105
- State: Palestine
- Governorate: North Gaza
- Date of depopulation: Late 2023

Government
  - Type: City
  - Head of Municipality: Mohamad Nazek al-Kafarna

Area
  - Total: 12.5 km^{2} (4.8 sq mi)

Population (2017)
  - Total: 52,237
  - Estimate (2026): 0
  - Density: 4,180/km^{2} (10,800/sq mi)
- Name meaning: "The house of Hanun"
- Website: www.beithanoun.ps

Beit Hanoun or Beit Hanun (Arabic: بيت حانون) is a destroyed and depopulated Palestinian city on the northeast edge of the Gaza Strip. According to the Palestinian Central Bureau of Statistics, the town had a population of 52,237 in 2017. As a result of the ongoing Gaza war, the area of Beit Hanoun has been militarily contested between the Hamas administration and Israel. The remains of Beit Hanoun are located by the Nahal-Hanun stream, 6 kilometers (3.7 mi) away from the Israeli city of Sderot.

== History ==
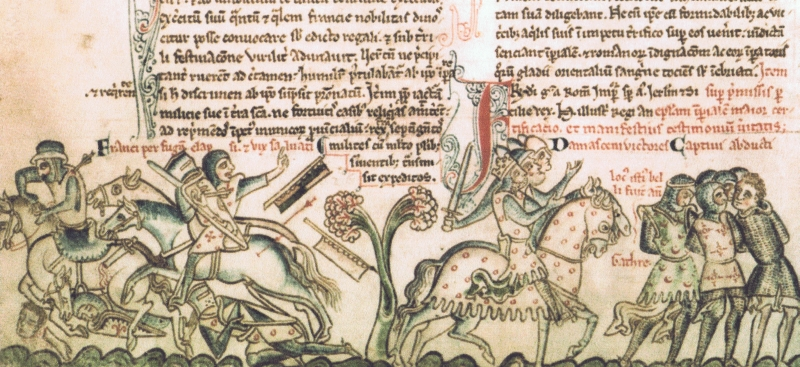
The 1239 Beit Hanoun battle, by Matthew Paris

The Ayyubids defeated the Crusaders at a battle in Umm al-Nasser hill, just west of Beit Hanoun in 1239, and built the Umm al-Naser Mosque ("Mother of Victories Mosque") there in commemoration of the victory. A Mamluk post office was located in Beit Hanoun as well.

=== Ottoman era ===
Incorporated into the Ottoman Empire in 1517 with all of Historic Palestine, Beit Hanoun appeared in the 1596 tax registers as being in the Nahiya of Gaza, part of Gaza Sanjak. It had a population of 36 Muslim households and paid a fixed tax rate of 33.3% on wheat, barley, summer crops, fruit trees, occasional revenues, goats and/or beehives; a total of 9,300 akçe.

During the 17th and 18th centuries, the area of Beit Hanoun experienced a significant process of settlement decline due to nomadic pressures on local communities. The residents of abandoned villages moved to survive settlements, but the land continued to be cultivated by neighbouring villages. Beit Hanoun survived, and Pierre Jacotin named the village Deir Naroun on his map depicting Napoleon's Syrian campaign of 1799.

In 1838, Edward Robinson passed by and described how "all were busy with the wheat harvest; the reapers were in the fields; donkeys and camels were moving homewards with their high loads of sheaves; while on the threshing-floors near the village, I counted not less than thirty gangs of cattle." He further noted it as a Muslim village, located in the Gaza district. In May 1863, Victor Guérin visited the village. He observed indications of ancient constructions in the shape of cut stones, fragments of columns, and bases among the gardens. He further noted that the population consisted of "400 souls". Socin found from an official Ottoman village list from about 1870 that Beit Hanoun had 94 houses and a population of 294. However, the population count included men only. Hartmann found that Bet Hanun had 95 houses.

In 1883, the PEF's Survey of Western Palestine described it as a small adobe village, "surrounded by gardens, with a well to the west. The ground is flat, and to the east is a pond beside the road."

=== British Mandate era ===
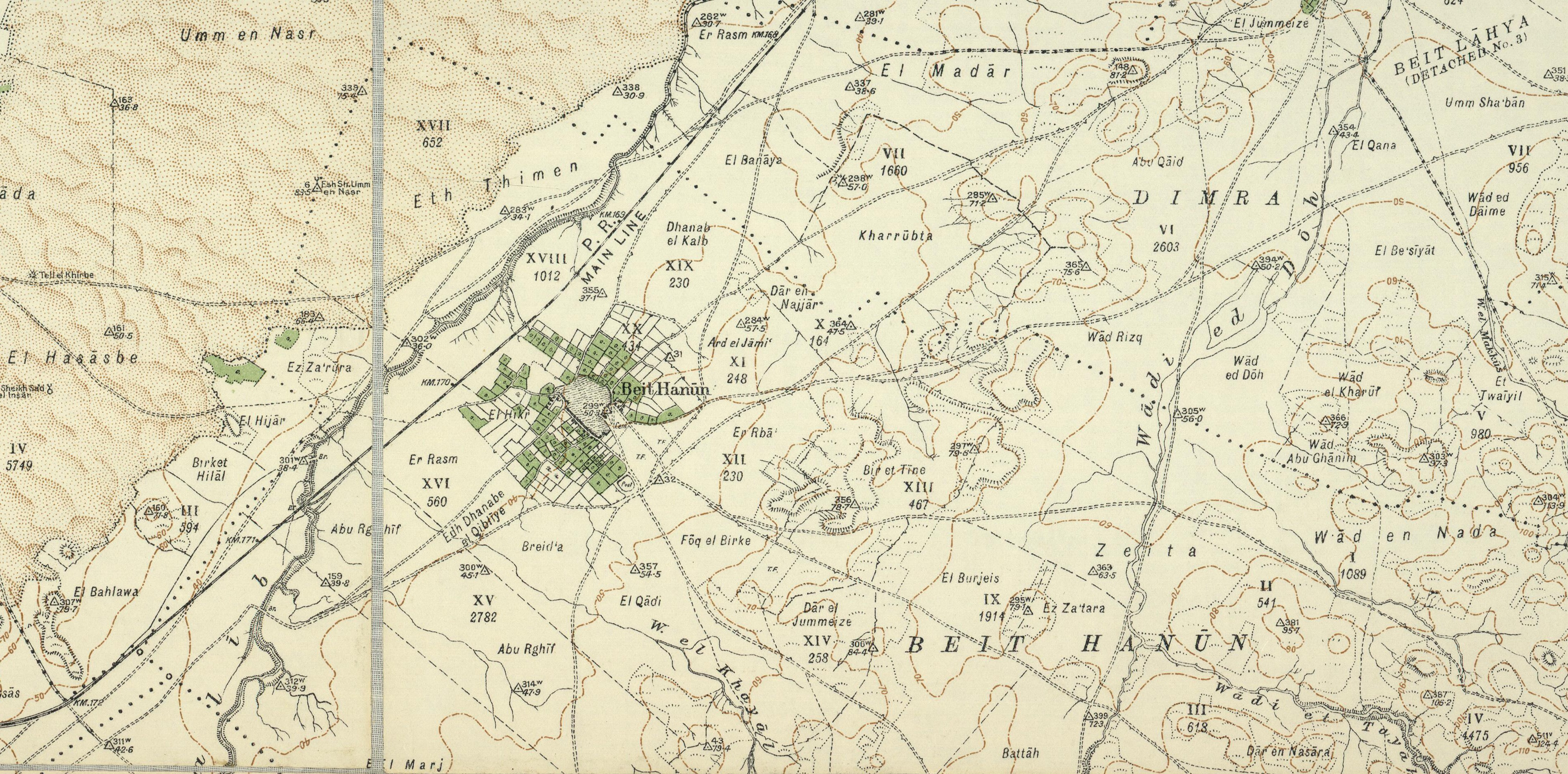
Beit Hanoun 1931 1:20,000

In the 1922 census of Palestine conducted by the British Mandate authorities, Beit Hanoun had a population of 885 inhabitants, all Muslim, decreasing in the 1931 census to 849, still all Muslims, in 194 houses.

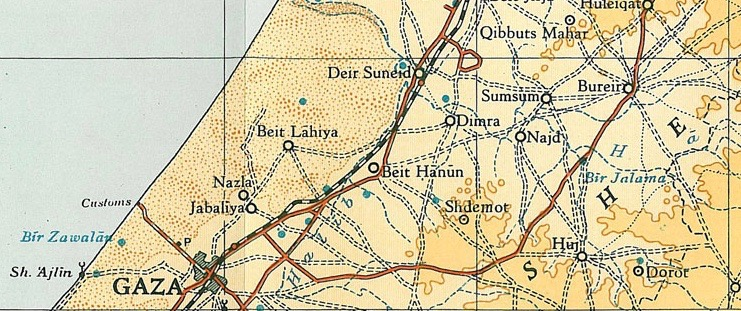
Beit Hanoun 1945 1:250,000

In the 1945 statistics, Beit Hanun had a population of 1,680 Muslims and 50 Jews, with 20,025 dunams of land, according to an official land and population survey. Of this, 2,768 dunams were for citrus and bananas, 697 were plantations and irrigable land, and 13,186 used for cereals, while 59 dunams were built-up land.

=== Egyptian occupation ===
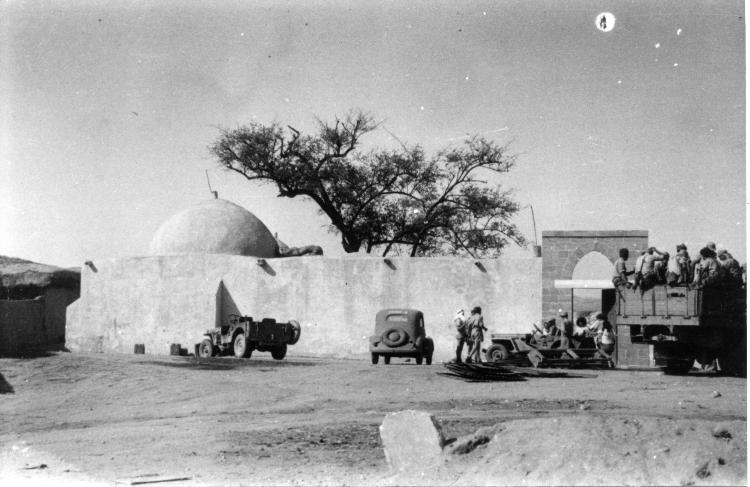
Members of Yiftach Brigade beside a mosque, Beit Hanoun, 1948

In the 1948 Arab–Israeli War, the vicinity of Beit Hanoun, and later Beit Hanoun itself, served as an Israeli tactical wedge (Beit Hanoun wedge) to halt the movement of the Egyptian army from Ashkelon to forces to the south in the area that later became the Gaza Strip.

During the occupation, Egypt complained to the Mixed Armistice Commission that on 7 and 14 October 1950, Israeli military forces had shelled and machine-gunned the Arab villages of Abasan al-Kabera and Beit Hanoun in Egyptian controlled territory of the Gaza Strip. According to Egypt, this action caused the death of seven and the wounding of twenty civilians.

=== Israeli occupation ===
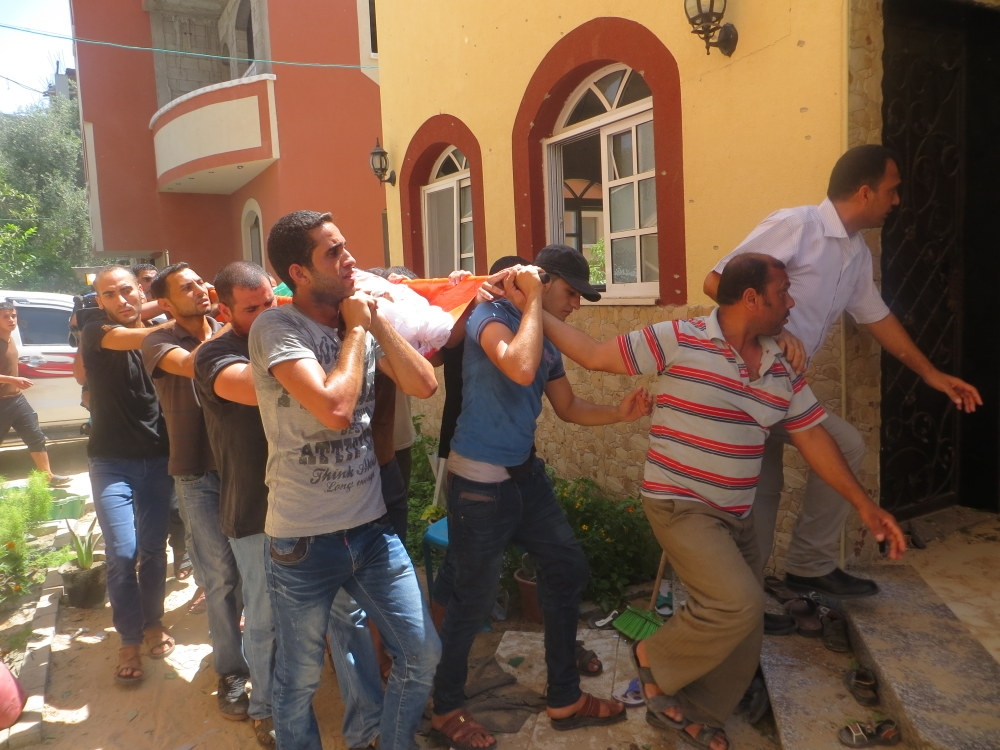
The body of a person killed in the home of 'Abd al-Hafez Hamad. Six members of one family were killed when the Hamad family home was bombed on the night of 8 July 2014.

According to the Palestinian Authority, 140 Palestinians were killed by Israeli forces in Beit Hanoun from September 2000 to November 2006.

The Israeli army besieged Beit Hanoun from 15 May to 30 June 2003, during which it demolished dozens of houses, razed large areas of agricultural land and largely destroyed the civilian infrastructure of the town. During the Raid on Beit Hanoun in 2004, the town was besieged for 37 days. About 20 Palestinians were killed, and immense damage was caused to property and infrastructure. In 2005, the infrastructure of Beit Hanoun was heavily damaged during an incursion by Israeli forces.

=== Palestinian administration ===
Following the removal of Israeli settlers from Gaza in August 2005, 19 Palestinian civilians were killed in the 2006 shelling of Beit Hanoun. In December 2006, the UN appointed a fact-finding commission led by Anglican Archbishop Desmond Tutu to investigate the attack. Despite initial difficulties accessing the area via Israel, the commission, led by Tutu and legal scholar Christine Chinkin, eventually entered Gaza through Egypt. Tutu's final report to the United Nations Human Rights Council concluded that "[I]n the absence of a well-founded explanation from the Israeli military – who is in sole possession of the relevant facts – the mission must conclude that there is a possibility that the shelling of Beit Hanoun constituted a war crime."

On 27 March 2007, sewage water flooded the northern Umm al-Nasser suburb of Beit Hanoun, killing five people.

Shells and rockets hit Beit Hanoun several times during the 2014 Israel–Gaza conflict. The shelling of a UNWRA Elementary school by Israel killed 11–15 people, including women and children. An IDF spokesperson said that "the IDF encountered heavy fire in vicinity of the school, including anti-tank missile ... [and] that an errant mortar did indeed land in the empty courtyard of the school".

=== Gaza war (2023–present) ===
Israeli forces advanced on the city on 27 October 2023. By 12 November, the IDF advanced beyond the city, however, they continued to be attacked behind the frontlines due to a maintained presence of al-Quds and Al-Qassam militants. As a result of massive bombardment campaigns and the ground invasion, Beit Hanoun was believed to be entirely depopulated and destroyed, with destruction so extensive that it has been described as "no longer existing". On 18 December 2023, it was reported that Israeli forces had full control over Beit Hanoun and had destroyed Hamas’ Beit Hanoun Battalion.

However, local media claimed that on 24 December, Israeli forces left Beit Hanoun due to remaining Palestinian fighting in the city. IDF withdrawal was not confirmed by independent media. Civilians were seen tearing down Israeli flags that were flown in the city in late December.

On 6 February 2024 it was reported that the IDF was again operating in Beit Hanoun and that troops had identified "four terrorist operatives trying to set up observation infrastructure in an attempt to restore intelligence-gathering capabilities" in Beit Hanoun and had launched a strike against them.

On 31 May 2024, the IDF once more ended up withdrawing from Beit Hanoun following a 20-day operation that marked the end of the Battle of Jabalia.

Beit Hanoun was one of the three cities attacked by Israel during its siege of North Gaza, which lasted from October 2024 to January 2025. In January, during the 2025 Gaza war ceasefire, some families returned to Beit Hanoun to attempt to salvage their homes, many of which had been destroyed or damaged in the war.

On 7 July 2025, the Israeli defense minister, Israel Katz, posted an aerial photograph showing Beit Hanoun and other areas in North Gaza, declaring that the area had been "level[ed] to the ground." That same day, there was a Hamas attack on IDF forces; five IDF soldiers were killed and were wounded. On 8 July 2025, the Israeli military had surrounded the Beit Hanoun area "from all directions," with forces of the Netzah Yehuda Battalion and the 646th Reserve Paratroopers Brigade, and was attempting to exert full control over the area that they had failed to capture during prior clashes in the city. On 31 July, the Israeli military once again attacked Beit Hanoun. Colonel Netanel Shamaka asserted that Hamas members were still using tunnels in the city, and that the IDF's goal for this fifth offensive was to destroy the remainder of the tunnels. He also stated that "maybe 10 buildings" would remain afterward, because they were civilian buildings and did not contain tunnel entrances. In September 2025 it was reported that the last remaining buildings in Beit Hanoun had been destroyed.

== Educational and health institutions ==
There were twelve secondary, primary and agricultural schools in Beit Hanoun and an agricultural college which is related to al-Azhar University – Gaza. There was a medical center and hospital in the city and several clinics mostly managed by the United Nations. All of these were destroyed during the Gaza war.

== Demographics ==
In 1922, Beit Hanoun had a population of 885. In 1931, the population slightly decreased to 849. The population then increased to 946 in 1938. Up to this point, the population had been entirely Muslim. The population increased again by 1945 to 1,730 (1,680 Muslims and 50 Jews). In 1961, the population rose to 3,876.

Beit Hanoun's residents came from various origins. These included people Egypt, Kurds from Hebron, the Hauran (southwest Syria), Transjordan, and Bedouin communities.

In the first official census by the Palestinian Central Bureau of Statistics (PCBS), Beit Hanoun had a population of 20,780. Over 90% of the residents were Palestinian refugees. There were 10,479 males and 10,301 females. People of 14 years of age or younger constituted the majority at 65.6%, people between the ages of 20 and 44 were 26.8%, 45 to 64 was 5.7%, and residents above the age of 65 were 1.9%.

Before the Gaza war, Beit Hanoun was home to an estimated 60,000 people. It has since been entirely depopulated as a result of the Gaza war, and all of its structures have been destroyed.

== Sister cities ==
- Osmangazi, Turkey
- Selçuklu, Turkey
- Zeytinburnu, Turkey

== See also ==
- 2004 Israeli operation in the northern Gaza Strip
- 2006 Israeli operation in Beit Hanoun

== Bibliography ==
- Barron, J. B., ed. (1923). Palestine: Report and General Abstracts of the Census of 1922. Government of Palestine.
- Conder, C.R.; Kitchener, H.H. (1883). The Survey of Western Palestine: Memoirs of the Topography, Orography, Hydrography, and Archaeology. Vol. 3. London: Committee of the Palestine Exploration Fund.
- Department of Statistics (1945). Village Statistics, April, 1945. Government of Palestine. Archived from the original on 2 April 2019.
- Guérin, V. (1869). Description Géographique Historique et Archéologique de la Palestine (in French). Vol. 1: Judee, pt. 2. Paris: L'Imprimerie Nationale.
- Hadawi, S. (1970). Village Statistics of 1945: A Classification of Land and Area Ownership in Palestine. Palestine Liberation Organization Research Centre. Archived from the original on 8 December 2018.
- Hartmann, M. (1883). "Die Ortschaftenliste des Liwa Jerusalem in dem türkischen Staatskalender für Syrien auf das Jahr 1288 der Flucht (1871)". Zeitschrift des Deutschen Palästina-Vereins. 6: 102–149.
- Hütteroth, W.-D.; Abdulfattah, K. (1977). Historical Geography of Palestine, Transjordan and Southern Syria in the Late 16th Century. Erlanger Geographische Arbeiten, Sonderband 5. Erlangen, Germany: Vorstand der Fränkischen Geographischen Gesellschaft. ISBN 3-920405-41-2. Archived from the original on 28 September 2024.
- Karmon, Y. (1960). "An Analysis of Jacotin's Map of Palestine" (PDF). Israel Exploration Journal. 10 (3, 4): 155–173, 244–253. Archived from the original (PDF) on 22 December 2019.
- Mills, E., ed. (1932). Census of Palestine 1931. Population of Villages, Towns and Administrative Areas. Jerusalem: Government of Palestine.
- Palmer, E.H. (1881). The Survey of Western Palestine: Arabic and English Name Lists Collected During the Survey by Lieutenants Conder and Kitchener, R. E. Transliterated and Explained by E.H. Palmer. Committee of the Palestine Exploration Fund.
- Robinson, E.; Smith, E. (1841). Biblical Researches in Palestine, Mount Sinai and Arabia Petraea: A Journal of Travels in the year 1838. Vol. 2. Boston: Crocker & Brewster.
- Sharon, M. (1999). Corpus Inscriptionum Arabicarum Palaestinae, B-C. Vol. II. BRILL. ISBN 9004110836.
- Socin, A. (1879). "Alphabetisches Verzeichniss von Ortschaften des Paschalik Jerusalem". Zeitschrift des Deutschen Palästina-Vereins. 2: 135–163.
