= Om al-Nasr =

Al-Qaraya al-Badawiya القرية البدوية

Arabic transcription(s)
- Coordinates: 31°33′33″N 34°31′11″E
- State: State of Palestine
- Governorate: North Gaza
- Established: 1997
- Destroyed: March 2025

Area
  - Total: 0.8 km^{2} (0.31 sq mi)

Population (2017)
  - Total: 4,737
  - Density: 5,900/km^{2} (15,000/sq mi)

Om al-Nasr (Arabic: أم النصر) or Al-Qaraya al-Badawiya (القرية البدوية) is a Bedouin village within the northern Gaza governorate in the Gaza Strip. The population of the village is about 4,737 according to Palestinian Central Bureau of Statistics (PCBS) in 2017. The village was established in 1997 on an area of 800 dunums. The village was entirely destroyed in late March 2025 following the launch of Operation Might and Sword by the Israel Defense Forces during the Gaza War.

== See also ==
- Umm al-Nasr Mosque
