= Kfar Bialik =

Kfar Bialik: כפר ביאליק (Hebrew)
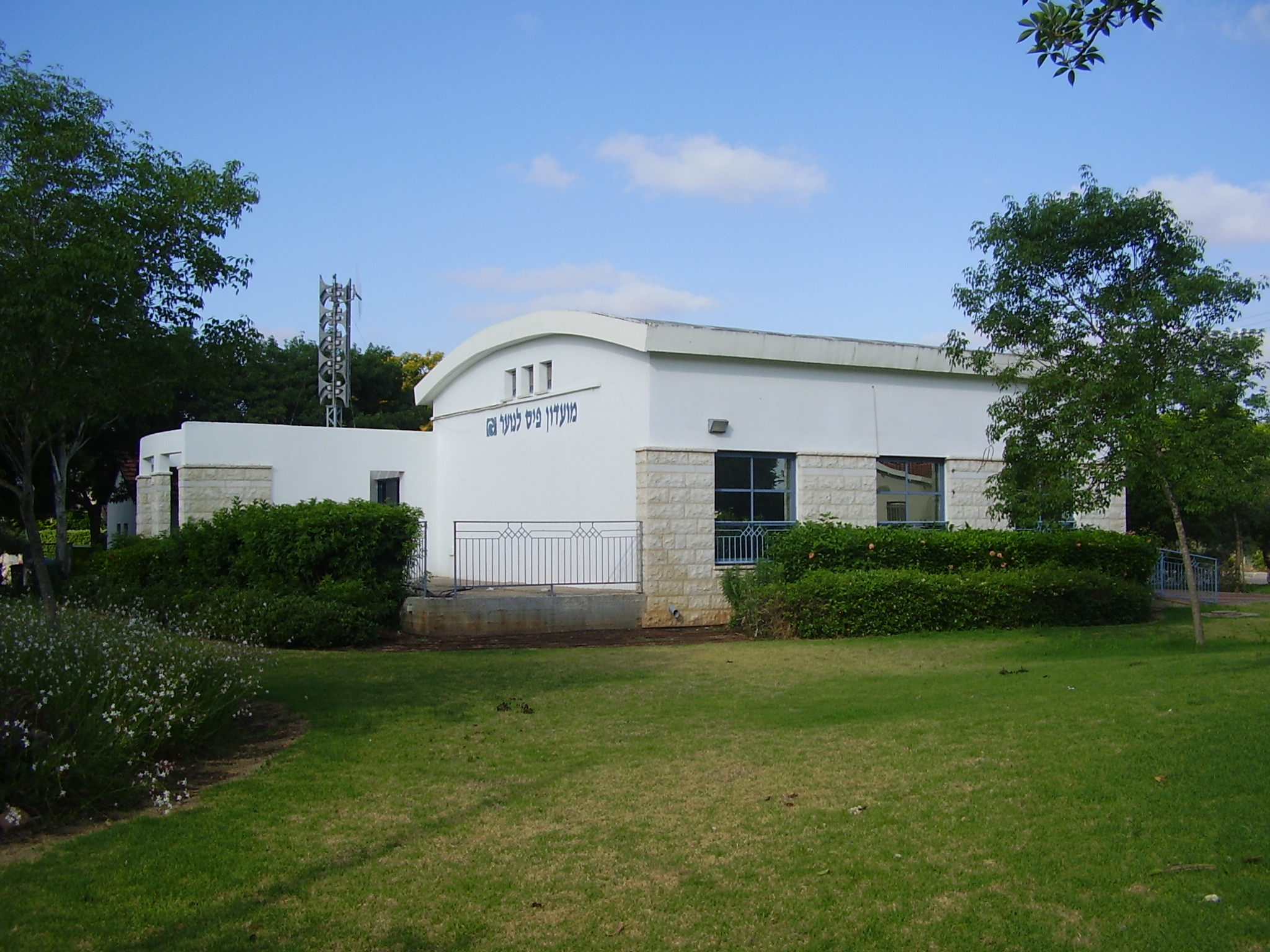

- Location within Northwest Israel Location within Israel
- Coordinates: 32°49′16″N 35°5′15″E
- Country: Israel
- District: Haifa
- Subdistrict: Haifa
- Council: Zevulun
- Founded: 1934
- Founder: Jewish immigrants from Germany
- Population (2024): 600
- Website: kfar-bialik.org.il

Kfar Bialik (Hebrew: כְּפַר בְּיַאלִיק, lit. 'Bialik Village') is a moshav in northern Israel. Located near Kiryat Bialik, it falls under the jurisdiction of Zevulun Regional Council. In 2024 it had a population of 600.

== History ==
The village was founded in 1934 on land owned by the Jewish National Fund by Jewish immigrants from Germany. It was named after Hayyim Nahman Bialik, who died the month before the moshav's establishment.

== Notable people ==
- Eyal Eizenberg
- Uri Sagi
