= Kunya =

Kunya may refer to:

- Kunya (Arabic), an honorific in Arabic names
- Kunya (river), a river in northwestern Russia
- Kunya, Russia, name of several inhabited localities in Russia

== See also ==
- Kunia Camp, Hawaii
