= Ismail Abu Shanab =

Palestinian political and militant leader (1950–2003)

- Born: 1950; Nuseirat, All-Palestine Protectorate, Kingdom of Egypt
- Died: 21 August 2003 (aged 52–53); Gaza city, Gaza Strip
- Education: Al Mansoura University; Colorado State University
- Occupation: Civil engineer
- Years active: 1980s–2003

Ismail Abu Shanab (Arabic: إسماعيل أبو شنب; 1950 – 21 August 2003) was a Palestinian engineer and one of the founders of Hamas. He was one of its three most senior leaders in Gaza. More specifically, he was the second highest leader of Hamas only after Sheikh Ahmed Yassin. He was also the political leader of Hamas, who was strongly against suicide bombings and in favor of a long-term truce.

== Early life and education ==
Shanab was born in the central Gaza refugee camp of Nuseirat in 1950. His family was originally from Al Jayyeh, a village near Ashkelon and Yubna. They were expelled from the village and settled in a refugee camp in 1948.

Shanab graduated from high school in 1966 and was accepted at then newly opened Bir Zeit University in the West Bank. However, due to the 1967 Arab-Israeli War and Israel's subsequent occupation, he could not attend the university. In 1972, he managed to go to Egypt to receive university education. He obtained a bachelor of science degree in civil engineering from Mansoura University in Cairo. After working four years in Gaza city, Shanab went to the US and obtained a master of science degree in civil engineering from Colorado State University.

== Career and activities ==
Shanab returned to Gaza city in 1977 after completing his undergraduate studies, and he worked at the municipal council until 1981. Following his completion of graduate studies in the U.S., Shanab began to work as an instructor in engineering at Gaza Islamic University. During this period, he met with the Hamas founder Ahmed Yassin, Ibrahim Magadmeh, and the Islamic Jihad founder Fathi Shiqaqi; eventually, he joined Hamas. He was imprisoned in 1989 for his involvement in founding Hamas and being a deputy to Ahmed Yassin. On the other hand, an Israeli press statement argued that Shanab was detained since he had admitted to have participated in planning and carrying out the kidnapping and murder of an Israeli soldier, Ilan Sa'adon. Shanab improved his religious knowledge base during his time in prison. He was freed in late 1996. He was in a solitary cell underground for two years during his imprisonment.

After his release, Shanab was elected as the head of the Palestinian Engineers Association on the list of Hamas in 1997. In November 1998, Palestinian police arrested Shanab and other top Hamas leaders, including Mahmud Zahar, Ismail Haniyya, and Ahmed Baher. The security forces of the Palestinian Authority arrested and detained the Hamas leaders, including Shanab, Abdulaziz Rantisi, and Mohammad Namer Hamdan, without any charge on 6 August 1999.

Then Shanab began to serve as Hamas observer in the Central Council of the Palestine Liberation Organization. He also became one of the spokespersons of Hamas' political wing in Gaza. His role as spokesperson was notable in that he was Hamas's most visible spokesperson in the western media. After suicide bombings killed 25 people in Israel in 2001, Palestinian police arrested Shanab and Ismail Haniya, among others, in December 2001. Shanab participated in the 2002 and 2003 peace talks as a Hamas representative. He also functioned as Hamas's link to Palestinian Prime Minister Mahmoud Abbas when Abbas was trying to persuade militant groups to stop attacking Israelis. Shanab was one of the supporters of ceasefire declared by armed Palestinian groups, including Hamas and Islamic Jihad, on 29 June 2003. The ceasefire (hudna in Arabic) was unilateral

Shanab was the third-in-command in Hamas, behind Abdulaziz Rantisi and Mahmud Zahar and in front of Ismail Haniya before his assassination in August 2003.

=== Views ===
Shanab represented Hamas's more moderate and pragmatic side, although he was subject to Yassin's leadership and committed to Hamas' ideology. Unlike Yassin, he supported a long-term ceasefire with Israel and a two-state solution. On the other hand, he argued that group decision-making is better than individual decision-making, even though the individual is right showing his readiness to comply with Hamas's decisions.

Historian Rashid Khalidi characterized Abu Shanab as “a vocal opponent within Hamas of suicide bombings." Although he did not advocate for suicide bombing attacks, which he called a primitive weapon, he stated "But, it’s all we have and it’s less harmful than F-16s loaded with tons of explosives."

== Personal life ==
Shanab was married and had nine children (five daughters and four sons). His eldest son, Hassan, studied computer engineering in the United States. His youngest son, Mesk, was two years old when Shanab was killed. As of 2012, his son Hamza (born 1984) headed the Palestinian Assembly for Supporting the Syrian Revolution, a nongovernmental organization.

Shanab lived in the community of Eshaikh Radhwan, north of Gaza City. He had good command of English.

== Assassination ==
On 21 August 2003, Shanab and his two bodyguards were hit and killed by an Israeli helicopter missile strike while travelling by a car in Rimal neighborhood of Gaza City. In the attack, an Apache helicopter fired three or four missiles at the car. The assassination occurred in retaliation for the suicide bombing of a Jerusalem bus on 19 August 2003, killing twenty mostly orthodox Jews, including six children. The Israel Ministry of Foreign Affairs issued a statement after the assassination and described Shanab as a senior terrorist and Hamas operative.

=== Consequences ===
The major consequence of his assassination was that the three-month ceasefire that had been declared on 29 June 2003 was terminated by Hamas, Islamic Jihad and Al-Aqsa Martyrs Brigades two days after his assassination, on 23 August 2003. The other consequence was that Hamas continued its suicide attacks that had been stopped for a while. The assassination of Shanab and of the other Hamas leaders next year weakened the authority of Mahmoud Abbas who succeeded Yasser Arafat and of Palestinian Authority, but increased the popularity of Hamas.

=== Funeral ===
Nearly 100,000 people attended the funeral ceremony for Shanab held in Gaza City on 22 August 2003. Ahmed Yassin along with other top Hamas leaders participated in the ceremony in the Omari mosque.
