= Kunya, Perm Krai =

Kunya Кунья
- Village
- Location within Perm Krai Location within Russia
- Coordinates: 58°41′N 56°45′E
- Country: Russia
- Region: Perm Krai
- District: Dobryansky District
- Time zone: UTC+5:00

Kunya (Russian: Кунья) is a rural locality (a village) in Dobryansky District, Perm Krai, Russia. The population was 2 as of 2010. There is 1 street.

== Geography ==
Kunya is located 43 km northeast of Dobryanka (the district's administrative centre) by road. Peremskoye is the nearest rural locality.
