= Umm al-Nasr Mosque =

Former mosque in Gaza Strip, Palestine

- مسجد أم النصر
- Location of the former mosque in Palestine

Religion
- Affiliation: Islam (former)
- Ecclesiastical or organisational status: Mosque (1239–2023)

Location
- Location: Beit Hanoun, Gaza Strip
- Country: Palestine
- Interactive map of Umm al-Nasr Mosque
- Coordinates: 31°32′30″N 34°32′10″E

Architecture
- Type: Mosque architecture
- Style: Islamic; Ayyubid
- Completed: 1239 CE

Specifications
- Dome: One
- Minaret: One
- Inscriptions: One

The Umm al-Nasr Mosque (Arabic: مسجد أم النصر), also known as the Beit Hanoun Mosque, is the oldest mosque in the Palestinian city of Beit Hanoun in the Gaza Strip. It is located in the center of the city and was built in 1239 CE. The mosque was heavily damaged in the 2006 Israeli operation in Beit Hanoun and the Gaza war (2023–25).

== History ==
The Umm al-Nasr Mosque was built in 1239 CE by the Ayyubids to commemorate their soldiers who had died in the battle on the mosque site between them and the Crusaders. The Ayyubids were victorious, hence the name Umm al-Nasr ("Mother of Victories"). The inscription on the wall above the mosque entrance attributes the construction to Ayyubid sultan al-Adil II.

The battle that is commemorated was not a major one, but in the history of later Crusades it was significant. Egyptian historian al-Maqrizi mentions that the battle occurred on November 13, 1239 and ended in an Egyptian (Ayyubid) victory. Crusader reports confirm al-Maqrizi's claim that Henry the Count of Bar, together with a thousand of his men, were killed in the hostilities. Further recorded is that 600 were taken prisoner, with most killed by their captors on the way to Egypt.

=== Gaza–Israel conflict ===
On November 1, 2006, the Israeli military entered Beit Hanoun in response to rocket attacks. During the offensive, the Palestinian militants sheltered inside the mosque leading to a stand-off with the Israeli military, with the two sides exchanging fire. An armoured bulldozer was used to demolish part of the compound enclosing the mosque. Hundreds of local women marched to protect the mosque on November 3 and help the militants inside escape. Two women were killed and ten injured. The mosque itself sustained damage during the siege, and its roof collapsed. By the time the Israeli troops withdrew on November 7 only the minaret was left standing. UNRWA condemned the Israeli military activities in Beit Hanoun, including the damage to the mosque.

During the Israel–Hamas war, in November 2023 Israel launched an intense bombing campaign of the Gaza Strip which destroyed or damaged nearly 1,000 mosques in the Gaza Strip. The Umm al-Nasr Mosque was amongst those damaged during the war. A report on the impact of the war on cultural heritage sites in the Gaza Strip described the damage as extensive and recorded bombing as bulldozer activity as the main causes. There have been accusations that Israel is intentionally destroying Palestine's cultural heritage.

== Architecture ==
The original mosque consisted of one large room, with a simple dome, built from crude and worn-out stones. As of 2013, nothing of the original mosque was left apart from the southern portico with its roof—which consists of fan vaults and shallow dome in the center. The prayer hall ended with a room to the east roofed with a dome supported on spherical triangles. The foundation plate was inscribed in Ayyubid nashki script.

== See also ==
- Islam in Palestine
- List of mosques in Palestine
