= 2004 Israeli operation in the northern Gaza Strip =

Military offensive in the Gaza strip

Coordinates: 31.535°N 34.539°E

Operation "Days of Penitence"
- Part of the Second Intifada
Date	29 September – 16 October 2004
Location	Gaza Strip
Result	Israeli victory

Belligerents
Israel (IDF)	Hamas

Casualties and losses
1 soldier	c. 130 Palestinians including 50–87 militants

The 2004 Israeli operation in the northern Gaza Strip took place when the Israel Defense Forces launched Operation "Days of Penitence" (Hebrew: מבצע ימי תשובה), otherwise known as Operation "Days of Repentance" in the northern Gaza Strip. The operation lasted between 29 September and 16 October 2004. About 130 Palestinians, and 1 Israeli were killed.

The operation focused on the town of Beit Hanoun and Beit Lahia and Jabalia refugee camps, which were said to have been used as launching sites of Qassam rockets on the Israeli town of Sderot and Israeli settlements in the Gaza Strip, and in particular in response to the death of two children in Sderot. The operation's name corresponds to the Hebrew name for the High Holiday season during which the operation was carried out.

== Overview ==
Following the death of two Israeli children from a Qassam rocket launched by Palestinian militants, Israel launched a major military invasion of the northern Gaza Strip, focusing on the towns of Beit Hanoun and Beit Lahia and the Jabaliya refugee camp. The stated goal of the operation, code-named "Days of Penitence" (ימי תשובה) by the Israeli Defence Force, was to prevent Palestinians from launching rockets and mortar shells into Israeli settlements in Gaza and the town of Sderot in Israel.

During this 17-day attack the Israeli military killed some 130 Palestinians; demolished at least 85 houses and damaged hundreds more; damaged public facilities, including schools, kindergartens and mosques, and destroyed farmland. The archaeological site of the Byzantine Church of Jabalia was also damaged. According to Israeli soldiers, many of the buildings that were demolished were used by Palestinian militants as a cover for launching Qassam rockets and for shooting anti-tank missiles.

During the UN Security Council deliberations over censuring Israel for this military attack, Israel accused the United Nations Relief and Welfare Agency (UNRWA) of complicity in Palestinian attacks by allowing its vehicles to transport rockets. The Israeli government released a video claiming that it showed rockets being loaded into the UNRWA ambulance. UNRWA denied the accusation and demanded an apology stating that the object was a stretcher, not a rocket (the person in the video was carrying the lightweight object with just one hand). On October 6, Israel retracted the accusation.(Reuters)

The attack resulted in a proposed Security Council resolution calling for Israel to withdraw. The United States vetoed the resolution on October 5 with the US Ambassador to the UN, John Danforth, saying the proposed resolution would have encouraged terrorism.

Over the weekend of October 17, the Israeli military announced that its troops withdrew from the Jabalia refugee camp and other populated areas and redeployed to positions nearby and proclaimed the attack a success, with a warning that the troops would return if the rocket attacks resume, which analysts from both sides say is likely. Israel 'redeploys' in Gaza, but who won?

Both sides claimed victory in the operation.

Capt. Jacob Dallal, an Israeli Defence Forces spokesman, acclaimed the operation's success: "We really impaired the ability to shoot Qassams from Jabalya. We engaged many cells and now there are fewer Hamas members to shoot rockets," he says. "We dealt a hard blow to the whole Hamas infrastructure in Jabalia." Israel 'redeploys' in Gaza, but who won?

The Palestine Information Center published a statement by Hamas spokesman Ismail Hanneya who asserted that the problem was not in resistance or in Qassam missiles but rather in what Hamas views as the Israeli occupation of Palestinian land: "Hamas achieved a victory over the Zionist enemy ... the blows of the resistance and the steadfastness of the people caused the occupying forces to withdraw without achieving any of their goals." Hamas: Resistance forced occupation to retreat

== Timeline ==
=== September 29 ===
- Five Palestinians, including Hamas member Tawfik Ali Charafi, were killed during Israeli raids in the Jabalia refugee camp in the Gaza Strip and Nablus in the West Bank. The Israeli government claims the troops entered in response to continued shelling of the Israeli town of Sderot from the Jabalia area, including Qassam rockets launched on September 28. (BBC) (Reuters) (Al Jazeera) (Haaretz)
- Two Israeli children, aged 3 and 5, are killed after a Qassam rocket attack by Hamas on the town of Sderot. Hamas claimed the attack was launched in retaliation for the Israeli raid of the Jabalia refugee camp, which left four Palestinians dead. (BBC) (Haaretz)
  - Two Palestinian teenagers are killed and power supplies are knocked out after an Israeli raid on the Jabalia refugee camp. The raid was launched in response to the rocket attacks on the town of Sderot which left two children dead. (BBC)

=== September 30 ===
- Israel launched a major offensive into the Jabalia refugee camp killing at least 23 gunmen and civilians. Earlier this morning, a column of Israeli tanks moved into the center of the camp, followed by bulldozers. At least three Palestinian civilians have been killed thus far. Homes are being demolished, forcing people to flee. 72 Palestinians are known to have been wounded. (BBC) (Reuters)
- Two Palestinians are killed by Israeli troops returning fire after an Israeli soldier was killed at an observation post in the northern Gaza Strip. The troops have been engaged in that part of the northern Gaza Strip since yesterday, September 29. (AP)
  - Two Israelis, including a civilian, are killed in an ambush close to Gaza. The Palestinian gunman was also killed. (BBC)

=== October 1 ===
- Israeli troops, backed by tanks and other military vehicles, entered the northern Gaza Strip city of Jabalia, and the nearby towns of Beit Hanoun and Beit Lahiya. At least five Palestinians are killed by Israeli rocket strikes on Jabalia. (BBC) (The Guardian)
- The Israeli military releases unmanned drone footage of the Gaza Strip showing what Israel says are Palestinian militants loading rockets into a van marked "UN." The UN dismisses the claim, saying that the footage actually shows a stretcher being loaded into a van. (Islam Online, S. Arabia) (Haaretz: 1, 2)

=== October 2 ===
- Yassir Arafat declared a state of emergency in the Gaza Strip and called for international aid following Israel's raid into Jabalia. (News 24 [S. Africa])
- Israeli forces shoot dead four members of Al-Aqsa Martyrs' Brigades and Hamas, who had tried to infiltrate the Israeli Kibbutz of Nahal Oz, about 200 meters outside of that Kibbutz. (Haaretz) (Al Jazeera) (The Statesman [India]) (INN [Israel])
- The U.S. government issues a statement urging Israel not to use excessive force during its current offensive into the Gaza Strip. (BBC)
- The Palestinian militant group Hamas says that it will continue using rockets to attack Israeli communities that border on the Gaza Strip, or Israeli settlements within it, regardless of Israeli military operations. (BBC)
- The Israeli military begins an operation to create a 9 km (5.6 mi) "buffer zone" within the northern Gaza Strip. Israel says that the purpose of the zone is to protect Israel from attacks using Qassam rockets (which have a 9 km (5.6 mi) range). (The Telegraph) (CNN)

=== October 3 ===
- On interview to CBC, UNRWA's commissioner-general, Peter Hansen said that he was sure that members of Hamas are also members of UNRWA. The Canadian Department of Foreign Affairs, who designate Hamas as a terrorist organization said it "will immediately seek clarification from Mr. Hansen directly and from UN authorities." (CBC)
- The UNRWA demanded an apology from Israel over claims that Gaza militants used a UN vehicle to transport a homemade Qassam rocket. The UN body showed what it said was the ambulance seen in footage released by the Israel Defense Forces and presented its driver and rescue workers to reporters. (Haaretz) (Jerusalem Post) He later said it would "have been outright dishonest to say that among a population with about 30% support for Hamas that none of them worked for us" (The Guardian)
- Secretary-General Kofi Annan requested that Israel halt its current military operations in the Gaza Strip, saying that they have led to "the deaths of scores of Palestinians, among them many civilians, including children." He also urges the Palestinian Authority to convince Hamas to halt the firing of rockets into Israel .
- At least four civilians—a deaf man and 3 children—are killed during Israeli raids in the Gaza Strip town of Jabalia. More than 60 Palestinians, including civilians, have been killed during Israel's current offensive into Gaza. Israeli Prime Minister Ariel Sharon says the Gaza operation will continue until Qassam rocket attacks end. (BBC) (Toronto Star)
- Two Palestinians are killed by an Israeli helicopter-launched missile moments after they launch a Qassam rocket into Israel. (Al-Mezan Center for Human Rights)

=== October 4 ===
- The siege on and within Gaza was severely tightened. According to Al Mezan Center for Human Rights, electricity and water facilities were targeted. Sick people were not allowed access to medical treatment in main hospitals in Gaza City or Egypt.
- "UN Monitor". unobserver.com. Archived from the original on October 23, 2004.
  - "Two senior Hamas activists were also seriously injured in a separate Israeli helicopter gunship attack in Gaza City overnight. Two rockets were fired at Mohammad al Simri and Hassan al Jabari. A Palestinian woman was also injured in the attack". unobserver.com. Archived from the original on October 23, 2004.
  - Hassaballah, Ramzi (October 23, 2004). "UN Monitor". unobserver.com. Archived from the original on October 23, 2004.
  - Israeli army chief Moshe Yaalon warned that the raid could last weeks. Melbourne Herald

=== October 5 ===
- The United States vetoed a Security Council resolution demanding an immediate end to military operations in the northern Gaza Strip and the withdrawal of Israeli forces. The vote in the 15-member Security Council was 11 in favor and one against, with Britain, Germany and Romania abstaining. (ABC News)
- A 13-year-old girl, Iman Darweesh Al Hams, was shot by soldiers from an Israeli military post near Rafah, while she was on her way to school. According to Israeli forces, the area was restricted and they suspected that Iman's schoolbag contained a bomb. IDF chief of staff Moshe Yaalon said she was sent there as a decoy by Palestinian militants. Platoon soldiers accused their commander of shooting 20 rounds at close range to "confirm the kill". The Israeli army chief prosecutor ordered an investigation of the allegations.
- Palestinians claim an Israeli unmanned drone aircraft fired a missile towards the Al Ajramy street in Jabalia camp. Two brothers were killed, Hasan Abdul Hai Darweesh, 30, and Mousa Abdul Hai Darweesh, 24, both from the neighboring Mashrou' neighborhood. Six others were injured, two of whom critically. (Al-Mezan Center for Human Rights)
- In Gaza City, Bashir al-Dabbash, a leader in the Palestinian militant group Islamic Jihad, is killed by a missile fired from an Israeli aircraft. (INN) (BBC)
- Three Hamas militants are killed after infiltrating the Israeli settlement of Kfar Darom. One of the militants blew up when hit by Israeli gunfire, killing a Thai worker in addition to himself. The other two militants were killed by IDF forces. Gaza Strip. (Haaretz) (INN) (IMRA)

=== October 6 ===
- An Israeli tank fired artillery at homes in the Al Maslakh neighborhood of Jabalia camp killing Abdullah Qahman, 15, Hamdan Faraj Ubaid, 50, and his 22-year-old son Hammudeh Ubaid. IDF said it shot back after being attacked by anti-tank weapon, hitting the house from which the rocket was fired. Al-Mezan Center for Human Rights, (Guardian)
- Ahmad Imad Abu Samak, 8, and Amneh An Najjar, 60, were critically injured by bullet wounds to the head in al Maslakh and Nuzha neighborhoods, respectively, of Jabalia town.
- A 10-year-old boy, Muhammad Mansour Abed Rabu was wounded in his left leg by Israeli gunfire in al Mahkama street in Jabalia. (Al-Mezan Center for Human Rights)

=== October 7 ===
- Suleyman abu Foul, 15, and his 14-year-old nephew Raed abu Zaid, were killed by Israeli fire in Jabalia. Israeli military sources said Suleyman and his nephew were killed by a missile fired from a helicopter after an airborne drone spotted two suspicious figures who appeared to be launching a Qassam rocket. A 16-year-old from Jabalia, Muhammad Abu Saif, died from wounds received by Israeli bullets in the neck and the chest on October 1. (Al-Mezan Center for Human Rights)
- Their deaths—plus the death of a 13-year-old Palestinian boy who had been injured earlier—pushed the toll from the latest fighting to more than 80. Late in the day, Israeli forces shot a 12-year-old girl, Samah Mu'een Udeh, in the head in the Beit Hanoun community. (Al-Mezan Center for Human Rights)(Boston Globe)
- Witnesses say that two Palestinian children were killed when the Israeli military shelled a crowd near the Jabaliya refugee camp. Israel says that an Israeli helicopter gunship fired at two people attempting to launch a Qassam rocket. (BBC)

=== October 8 ===
- A nine-year-old girl, Samah Samir Nassar, was killed and several homes were damaged.
- Israeli tanks fired shell towards Abu Hasira neighborhood, near Jabalia Youth Club and killed two Palestinians: Muhammad Nabil Subeh and Yasir Al Khateeb, both 19, from Jabalia camp. Three other people were injured, one of whom critically. (Al-Mezan Center for Human Rights)
- A worker at Rafiah Yam is shot and killed by Palestinian militants. (INN), (INN)
- Salih Abu Al Ghseen, 35, a man suffering from mental illness, was killed by Israeli forces east of Wadi as-Salqa village in the middle of the Gaza Strip. (Al Mezan Center for Human Rights).

=== October 9 ===
- Israeli troops shot and killed a local leader of the Hamas' military wing in Jabalia, Abed Rauf Nabhan, as he was preparing to fire an anti-tank missile at Israel Defense Forces tanks invading the Jabalia refugee camp. The Israeli military claimed that Nabhan was responsible for the launching of the rocket that killed two young children in Sderot on Sukkot eve, triggering the army offensive in northern Gaza. Abed Nabhan, 25, was one of five Palestinians killed Saturday. (ABC News) (Maariv)
- Israeli tanks fired shells towards a 6-story residential building, owned by the Salim family, in the town of Beit Lahia. It hit the sixth floor and killed Ameen Mahmud Salim, 36 Sufiyan Mousa Salim, 28. Three of the family members were injured in the attack: Dawoud Salim, Ahmad Salim and Muhammad Salim. (Al-Mezan Center for Human Rights)
- Palestinian anti-tank missile hit a house in Beit Hanoun, causing to collapse on the people inside. (Maariv)

=== October 10 ===
- At approximately 3 am today, Sunday 10 October 2004, explosion is heard at the Center of the town of Beit Hanoun. Palestinian say a missile hit close to the UNRWA Women's Center and injured two Palestinians critically.(Al-Mezan Center for Human Rights)
- Raid Muhammad Al Mabhouh, 22, from Jabalia camp died from wounds sustained on October 1, 2004. (Al-Mezan Center for Human Rights)
- Israeli forces fired a missile at a house owned by Adnan Al Ajrami and a crafts factory in a densely populated neighborhood in Jabalia camp. The house and factory were destroyed and nine neighboring homes were severely damaged. A schoolteacher, Mahir Muhammad Zaqout, 39, was killed on his way to school and nine people were injured, including 4 children. The IDF said it targeted bomb-planters.(Al-Mezan Center for Human Rights)
- An Israeli drone launched a missile towards Al Ajrami Street in Jabalia refugee camp. Four Palestinians were injured, one of whom, 21-year-old Sameh Zamil Al Wheedy, died at hospital a few hours later. (Al-Mezan Center for Human Rights)

=== October 11 ===
- At 3:15 am, an Israeli unmanned aerial vehicle launched a missile towards Al Harthani Secondary School in Beit Lahia. Three people were injured, one critically. (Al Mezan Center for Human Rights)
- In the middle-Gaza town of Deir Al Balah, Israeli tanks and armored bulldozers entered the Al Mahata neighborhood of Jabalia camp. Samir Muhammad Khammash, 29, was killed by a bullet to the head. Five other people were injured, including three children. Ibrahim Fayiz Abdul Hadi, 7, was injured while inside his house. (Al Mezan Center for Human Rights)
- At 10:30 am, artillery from the Israeli settlement of Neve Dekalim was launched on the Palestinian refugee camp at Khan Younis. The maternity ward of Nasser Hospital was hit. Hospital workers and patients were treated for trauma. (Al Mezan Center for Human Rights)
- At 3:15 am today, 22-year-old Ahmad Zaki Hamad, from the town of Beit Hanoun, and 21-year-old Yousif Abu Saif of Jabalia were pronounced dead from injuries suffered in two separate missile attacks on October 10. (Al Mezan Center for Human Rights)
- About 3:56 pm, two Qassam rockets were launched at Kibbutz Saad in the Negev. No injuries were reported. (INN)
- About 5:50 pm, security fence workers were fired upon south of Kissufim. No injuries were reported.(INN)
- About 6:16 pm, three Israeli soldiers were wounded in Jabaliya. (INN)
- About 8:38 pm, two 25 kilogram bombs were disarmed by Israeli demolition experts (INN)
- About 7:52 pm, a Qassam rocket was launched against Kibbutz Nir Yitzhak in the Negev. No injuries were reported. (INN)

=== October 12 ===
- About 8:15 am, several mortar shells were fired at the community of Ganei Tal. (INN)
- At approximately 11:00 am, Palestinian security and hospital sources claimed that Israeli soldiers at the Neve Dekalim settlement shot at UNRWA Al Khalidyeh Primary School in Khan Younis refugee camp critically injuring 10-year-old Ghadeer Jaber Mkheemar in the chest while she was inside her classroom. Israeli military sources claim that the soldiers where shooting at a mortar emplacement either next to or within the school grounds. (CNN)
- About 12:30 pm, an anti-tank missile was fired at Israeli soldiers near Rafah. (INN)
- About 1:15 pm, a bomb was detonated against Israeli soldiers operating in Jabaliah. (INN)
- About 4:22 pm, Israeli soldiers fired at fighters attempting to launch a missile from within the area of a mosque in Khan Yunis. The missile launch was prevented. (INN)
- Mortar attack in southern Gaza. (INN)

=== October 13 ===
- About 4:48 am, Arab medics reported that an Israeli helicopter missile strike upon a house in Beit Lahia killed Mohammed Marous, 22, a Hamas militant and wounded three others. (Reuters)
- Israeli Defence Forces killed two al-Aqsa Martyrs' Brigades militants in Jabalia. (Haaretz)
- At 12:20 pm today Israeli forces fired a missile towards a crowd of people in the western part of Beit Lahia killing two Palestinians, Riziq Hasan Az Zeety, 38, and Muhammad Said Al Masri, 25. (Al Mezan Center for Human Rights)
- Two Qassam rockets landed in open field near Sderot. An early warning system to alert the residents of Sderot, which was installed by the IDF, worked flawlessly, according to security officer. Due to the closeness of Gaza launch sites to Sderot only 15–20 seconds of warning was possible. (Haaretz)(INN)
- In Rafah at 6:40 pm, Israeli forces killed Jihad Housam Barhoum, 16, and critically wounded Abdul Rahman Barhoum, 8, when a tank fired shells at the refugee camp. (Al Mezan Center for Human Rights)
- In Hebron, IDF forces arrested Imad Qawasameh, Hamas senior who was responsible for the double suicide bombing which killed 16 people in Beersheba on August 31, 2004. According to witnesses, Imad surrendered immediately after a Caterpillar D9 armoured bulldozer started to demolish his house. (Haaretz)(INN)
- About 7:20 pm, a Qassam rocket landed near Kibbutz Miflasim in the Negev. (INN)
- About 9:21 pm, mortar shells landed within the Israeli community of Netzarim. (INN)
- Four militants were killed in two actions by Israeli soldiers. (Reuters)

=== October 14 ===
- The Israeli army attacked the refugee camp of Rafah, in the southern Gaza Strip. Israeli forces stormed into Block (J) of the refugee camp at 9:45 pm. Tanks fired shells towards the densely populated block killing Ismail Muhammad As Sawalha, 70, Ahmad Salih Al Tahrawi, 21, and Ali Abdul Kareem Shaath, 23. In addition, Khadra Shoman, 75, was wounded by shrapnel wound to the head. Israeli press, however, reported that the Tahrawi and Shaath were armed militants.

=== October 15 ===
- Israeli Defence Forces prevented a launch of Qassam rocket from Jabalia refugee camp. According to soldiers from the Golani Brigade, militants were accompanied by children, who helped carry the rockets to the launch site. The army refrained from using a helicopter gunship because of the presence of children allegedly being used as human shields. Israeli forces report that infantry units engaged the militants with warning shots causing them to flee, abandoning the launcher and other equipment. (Haaretz)
- At 12:05 am today, Israeli forces launched a missile towards Block (7) in Jabalia camp. Two Palestinians, Muhyi Ad Din Al Madhoun, 19, and Nidal Harb Masoud, 20, were killed. Several homes were also damaged in the attack.
- Three armed militants, two of al Aqsa Martyrs' Brigades and one of Hamas were killed in Jabalia by Israeli Air Force strike. (Haaretz)
- IDF begins to redeploy in northern Gaza area. Troops, armored forces and engineers pull-back from Jabalia, Beit Lahia and Beit Hanoun. The forces remain on alert to reenter the area if a Qassam rocket should be launched. (Haaretz)
- An IDF investigation regarding the death of Iman Darweesh Al Hams in Rafah on October 5 cleared the Givati Brigade platoon commander on the scene of charges by fellow soldiers that he emptied his rifle magazine into the girl's body as she lay wounded. The IDF accepted the commander's claim that he fired into the ground near the girl after coming under fire in a dangerous area. The officer was suspended from duty pending the outcome of a police investigation. (BBC)(Maariv)
- In Rafah, two soldiers are lightly injured from an anti-tank missile. (Haaretz)
- The Israeli army in the evening began withdrawing from Jabalia, Beit Lahiya and Beit Hanoun in northern Gaza as "a gesture to the Palestinians ahead of the Muslim holy month of Ramadan", which began that Friday and entered Rafah in southern Gaza, to continue their military operations.

=== October 16 ===
- One al-Aqsa Martyrs' Brigades militant, hit on Friday, died from his wounds.(Haaretz)
- The US State Department welcomed the Israeli withdrawal and stressed the U.S. government position that Palestinians were responsible "for ending violence and terror, and particularly for ensuring that this area - that no area is used for attacks on Israel with rockets."

== Allegations of Israeli war crimes ==
In 2005 and 2006 Adalah requested the Military Advocate General (MAG) to initiate a criminal investigation into events that took place during Operation Rainbow. In 2007 also for Operation Days of Penitence. All requests had been denied. On 15 April 2007, Adalah, PCHR and Al-Haq filed a petition, in which they asked the Israeli High Court of Justice to order a criminal investigation, referring to many local and international organizations who had accused Israel of committing war crimes. Not earlier than two years later, on 6 May 2009, the Court held a hearing. Another 1.5 years later, on 8 December 2011, the Court rejected the petition because, according to the Israeli judges, the request was too late and too unspecific, the aim of the operations was justified, and a criminal investigation was not the most appropriate tool.

== Casualties ==
The casualties from 28 September to 16 October 2004 are as follows:

=== Israelis ===
- One soldier
- One woman
- Two children

=== Palestinians ===
- According to Al Mezan Center for Human Rights, from 28 September to 14 October: 129 people killed, including 31 children
- According to Haaretz: 129 Palestinians: 68 members of the military wing of Hamas and the Islamic Jihad; 42 civilians
- According to B'Tselem: 133 Palestinians, including at least 50 civilians
- According to IDF: circa 130 people, most of them armed militants; 9 or 10 civilians
- According to Reuters: some 50 Hamas fighters; at least 62 militants and 43 other Palestinians believed to be civilians
