= Al Mezan Center for Human Rights =

Independent human rights organization in Palestine

- مركز الميزان لحقوق الانسان
- Type: Non-profit
- Location(s): Omar Mukhtar Street, Gaza, Palestine
- Region served: Palestine
- Key people: Kamal Al Sharafi (Chairman); Talal Aukalk (Vice Chairman); Issam Younis (Director General)
- Website: www.mezan.org/en

Al Mezan Center for Human Rights (ميزان) is a non-governmental organization based in Jabalia refugee camp in the Gaza Strip. Its declared goals are to promote and protect human rights in the OPT with a focus on 'economic, social and cultural rights' (ESCR); to work towards the realization of individual and collective human rights, including the right to self-determination through the channels of international law; to enhance democracy and good governance that respects human rights. The organization has a special consultative status in the United Nations.

== Name ==
Mezan (ميزان) is Arabic for balance or scales, as well as justice and equity.

== Activities ==
The Al Mezan Center for Human Rights states it is dedicated to securing a permanent foundation for the protection of human rights in the Gaza Strip. Although it claims its long-term aim is to foster development of full economic, social, and cultural rights, during the current heightened conflict between Israelis and Palestinians the Al Mezan Center has focused on what it alleges are accelerating violations of basic civil rights and human rights, primarily by the Israel Defense Forces.

In the role of human rights monitor, the Al Mezan Center documents alleged human rights violations, such as disproportionate military attacks on civilian areas that result in widespread civilian casualties, the practice of imprisonment without trial, political assassination, and official policies condoning brutality and torture that undermine development of civil society. The center also provides legal aid, advocacy, and capacity-building services and resources and conducts educational activities to raise awareness in the local community about basic human rights, democracy, and the importance of international humanitarian relief.

== Funding ==
The organization's core donors are:

- Netherlands Representative Office
- Swiss Agency for Development and Cooperation (SDC)
- Kerkinactie/ Global Ministries
- International Commission of Jurists- Sweden

Individual project donors are:

- Mertz Gilmore Foundation
- The French Consulate (funded the library in 2002–2003)
- The Ford Foundation

== Affiliations ==
The organization is a member of the following networks and committees:

- Economic, Social and Cultural Rights Network (ESCR Network)
- Palestinian Non-Governmental Organizations Network (PNGO)
- Coalition for Accountability and Integrity
- Middle East and North Africa Network to Stop the Use of Children as soldiers
- Habitat International Coalition – Housing and Land Rights Network
- MENA Network to Stop the Proliferation and Misuse of Small Arms & Light Weapons

== Reports of the center ==
In 2017, Al Mezan issued a report about an attack on fishermen in Gaza. Israeli naval forces fired at a Palestinian fishing boat off the coast of Al Waha, North Gaza. One of the fishermen was shot in the back and five others were detained for 24 hours and their boat was confiscated. Israeli forces had reportedly killed six fishermen, injured 115, detained 613 and seized 146 boats since 2000, harming the Palestinian fishing sector.

== See also ==
- Al-Haq
- Al Qaws
- Aswat
- B'Tselem
- 2025 Hamas executions
