= History of Israel (1948–present) =

History of the State of Israel since its independence

In 1948, following the 1947–1948 war in Mandatory Palestine, the Israeli Declaration of Independence sparked the 1948 Arab–Israeli War, which resulted in the 1948 Palestinian expulsion and flight from the land that the State of Israel came to control and subsequently led to waves of Jewish immigration from other parts of the Middle East.

The latter half of the 20th century saw a series of further conflicts between Israel and its neighbouring Arab nations. In 1967, the Six-Day War erupted; in its aftermath, Israel captured and occupied the Golan Heights from Syria, the West Bank from Jordan, and the Gaza Strip and the Sinai Peninsula from Egypt. In 1973, the Yom Kippur War began with an attack by Egypt on the Israeli-occupied Sinai Peninsula.

In 1979, the Egypt–Israel peace treaty was signed, based on the Camp David Accords. In 1993, Israel signed the Oslo I Accord with the Palestine Liberation Organization, which was followed by the establishment of the Palestinian National Authority. In 1994, the Israel–Jordan peace treaty was signed. Despite efforts to finalize the peace agreement, the conflict continues to play a major role in Israeli and international political, social, and economic life.

== Declaration of Independence ==
With the British Mandate of Palestine scheduled to come to an end on 15 May 1948, the governing body of the Jewish community, the Jewish National Council (JNC), on 2 March 1948 began work on the organization of a Jewish provisional government. On 12 April 1948 it formed the Minhelet HaAm (Hebrew: מנהלת העם, lit. People's Administration), all of its members being drawn from Moetzet HaAm (People's Council), the temporary legislative body set up at the same time.

On 14 May 1948—the day the last British forces left Haifa—the People's Council gathered at the Tel Aviv Museum and proclaimed the establishment of a Jewish state in Eretz Israel to serve as the homeland for the Jewish people, to be known as the State of Israel. The meeting was led by David Ben-Gurion, the Executive Head of the World Zionist Organization, (Note: Then known as the Zionist Organization.) Chairman of the Jewish Agency for Palestine, and soon to be first Prime Minister of Israel. The event is celebrated annually in Israel as Independence Day, a national holiday on 5 Iyar of every year according to the Hebrew calendar. After the Declaration, Minhelet HaAm became the Provisional government of Israel, whilst Moetzet HaAm became the Provisional State Council.

Paragraph 13 of the Declaration provides that the State of Israel would be based on freedom, justice and peace as envisaged by the prophets of Israel; it will ensure complete equality of social and political rights to all its inhabitants irrespective of religion, race or sex. However, the Knesset maintains that the declaration is neither a law nor an ordinary legal document. The Supreme Court has ruled that the guarantees were merely guiding principles, and that the declaration is not a constitutional law making a practical ruling on the upholding or nullification of various ordinances and statutes.

== The Arab–Israeli War ==
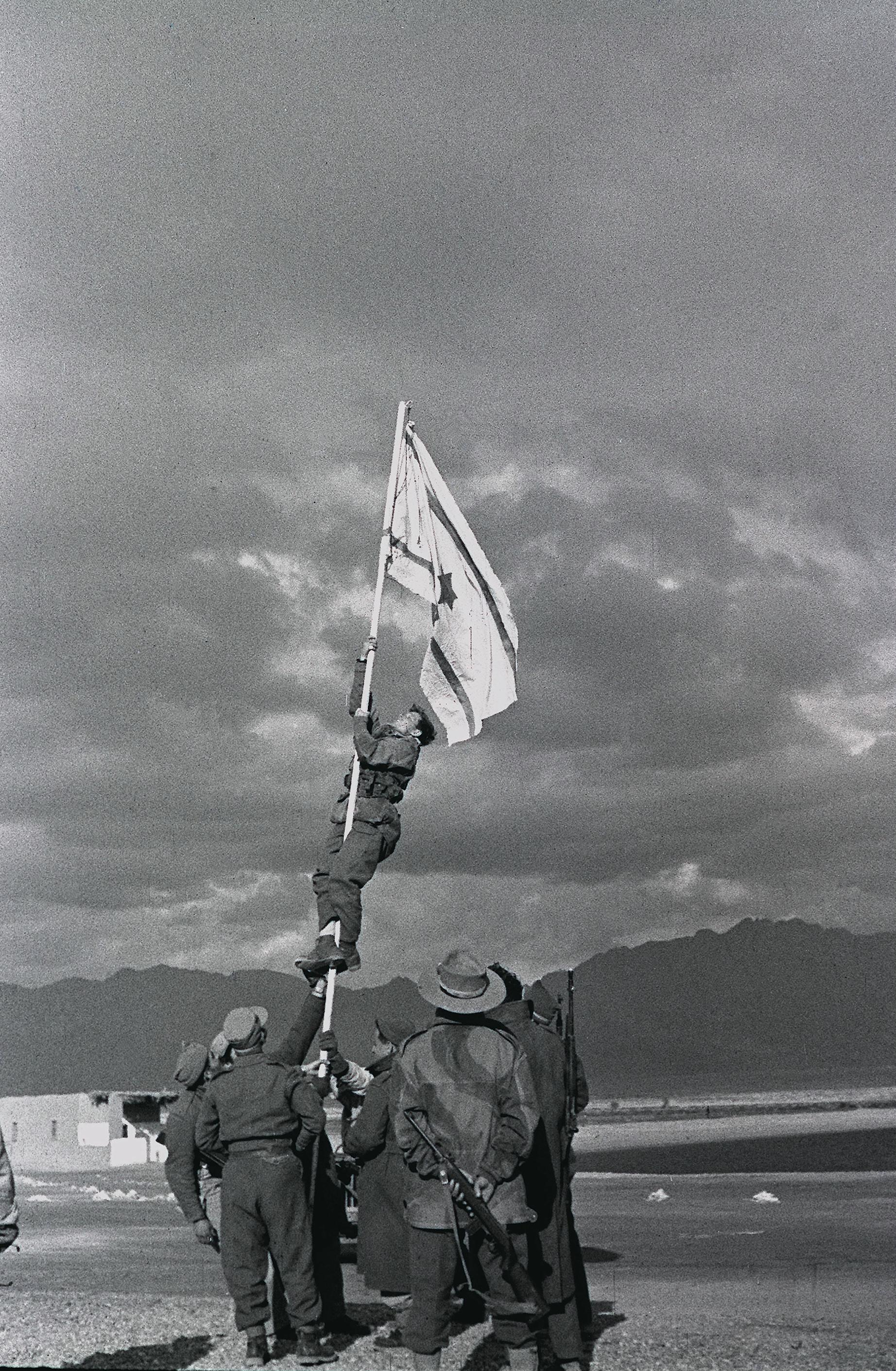
Avraham Adan raising the Ink Flag marking the end of the 1948 Arab–Israeli War

Immediately following the declaration of the new state, both superpower leaders, US President Harry S. Truman and Soviet leader Joseph Stalin, recognized the new state. The Arab League members Egypt, Transjordan, Syria, Lebanon and Iraq refused to accept the UN partition plan and proclaimed the right of self-determination for the Arabs across the whole of Palestine. The Arab states marched their forces into what had, until the previous day, been the British Mandate for Palestine, starting the first Arab–Israeli War. The Arab states had heavy military equipment at their disposal and were initially on the offensive (the Jewish forces were not a state before 15 May and could not buy heavy arms). On 29 May 1948, the British initiated United Nations Security Council Resolution 50 declaring an arms embargo on the region. Czechoslovakia violated the resolution, supplying the Jewish state with critical military hardware to match the (mainly British) heavy equipment and planes already owned by the invading Arab states. On 11 June a month-long UN truce came into effect.

Following independence the Haganah became the Israel Defense Forces (IDF). The Palmach, Etzel and Lehi were required to cease independent operations and join the IDF. During the ceasefire, Etzel attempted to bring in a private arms shipment aboard a ship called "Altalena". When they refused to hand the arms to the government, Ben-Gurion ordered that the ship be sunk. Several Etzel members were killed in the fighting.

Large numbers of Jewish immigrants—many of them World War II veterans and Holocaust survivors—now began arriving in the new state of Israel, and many joined the IDF.

After an initial loss of territory by the Jewish state and its occupation by the Arab armies, from July the tide gradually turned in the Israelis' favour and they pushed the Arab armies out and conquered some of the territory that had been included in the proposed Arab state. At the end of November, tenuous local ceasefires were arranged between the Israelis, Syrians, and Lebanese. On 1 December, King Abdullah announced the union of Transjordan with Arab Palestine west of the Jordan; only Britain recognized the annexation.

=== Armistice agreements ===
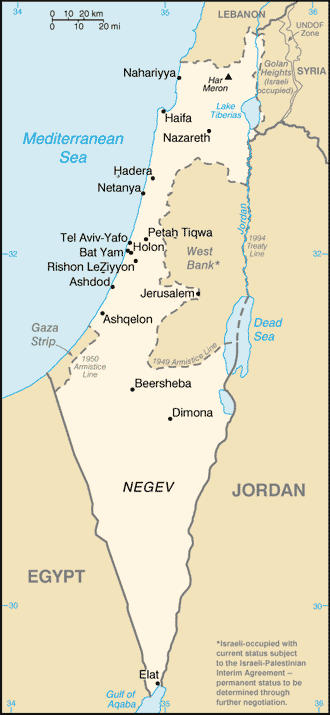
1949 Green Line

Israel signed armistices with Egypt (24 February), Lebanon (23 March), Jordan (3 April) and Syria (20 July). No actual peace agreements were signed. With permanent ceasefire coming into effect, Israel's new borders, later known as the Green Line, were established. These borders were not recognized by the Arab states as international boundaries. Israel was in control of the Galilee, Jezreel Valley, West Jerusalem, the coastal plain and the Negev. The Syrians remained in control of a strip of territory along the Sea of Galilee originally allocated to the Jewish state, the Lebanese occupied a tiny area at Rosh Hanikra, and the Egyptians retained the Gaza strip and still had some forces surrounded inside Israeli territory. Jordanian forces remained in the West Bank, where the British had stationed them before the war. Jordan annexed the areas it occupied while Egypt kept Gaza as an occupied zone.

Following the ceasefire declaration, Britain released over 2,000 Jewish detainees it was still holding in Cyprus and recognized the state of Israel. On 11 May 1949, Israel was admitted as a member of the United Nations. Out of an Israeli population of 650,000, some 6,000 men and women were killed in the fighting, including 4,000 soldiers in the IDF (approximately 1% of the population).

=== Palestinian expulsion and flight ===
According to United Nations figures, 726,000 Palestinians had fled or were expelled by the Israelis between 1947 and 1949. The precise number of refugees, many of whom settled in refugee camps in neighboring states, is a matter of dispute but around 80 percent of the Arab inhabitants of what became Israel (half of the Arab total of Mandatory Palestine) left or were expelled from their homes. Later, a series of laws passed by the first Israeli government prevented Arabs who had left from returning to their homes or claiming their property. They and many of their descendants remain refugees. Except in Jordan, the Palestinian refugees were settled in large refugee camps in poor, overcrowded conditions and denied citizenship by their host countries. In December 1949, the UN (in response to a British proposal) established an agency (UNRWA) to provide aid to the Palestinian refugees. It became the largest single UN agency and is the only UN agency that serves a single people.

== Establishment years ==
A 120-seat parliament, the Knesset, met first in Tel Aviv, then moved to Jerusalem after the 1949 ceasefire. In January 1949, Israel held its first elections. The Socialist-Zionist parties Mapai and Mapam won the most seats (46 and 19 respectively). Mapai's leader David Ben-Gurion was appointed prime minister, and formed a coalition that did not include Mapam, who were Stalinist and loyal to the USSR (another Stalinist party, non-Zionist Maki won 4 seats). This was a significant decision because it signaled that Israel would not be in the Soviet bloc. The Knesset elected Chaim Weizmann as the first (largely ceremonial) president of Israel. Hebrew and Arabic were made the official languages of the new state. All governments have been coalitions—no party has ever won a majority in the Knesset. From 1948 until 1977 all governments were led by Mapai and the Alignment, predecessors of the Labour Party. In those years Labour Zionists, initially led by David Ben-Gurion, dominated Israeli politics and the economy was run on primarily socialist lines.

=== Immigration and the economy ===
From 1948 to 1951, immigration doubled the Jewish population of Israel and left an indelible imprint on Israeli society. Overall, 700,000 Jews settled in Israel during this period. Some 300,000 arrived from Asian and North African nations as part of the Jewish exodus from Arab and Muslim countries. Among them, the largest group (over 100,000) was from Iraq. The rest of the immigrants were from Europe, including more than 270,000 from Eastern Europe, mainly Romania and Poland (over 100,000 each). Nearly all the Jewish immigrants could be described as refugees, but only 136,000 from Central Europe had international certification because they belonged to the 250,000 Jews registered by the allies as displaced after World War II and living in displaced persons camps in Germany, Austria, and Italy.

In 1950 the Knesset passed the Law of Return, which granted to all Jews and those of Jewish ancestry (Jewish grandparent), and their spouses, the right to settle in Israel and gain citizenship. That year 50,000 Yemenite Jews (99%) were secretly flown to Israel. In 1951 Iraqi Jews were granted temporary permission to leave the country and 120,000 (over 90%) opted to move to Israel. Jews also fled from Lebanon, Syria and Egypt.

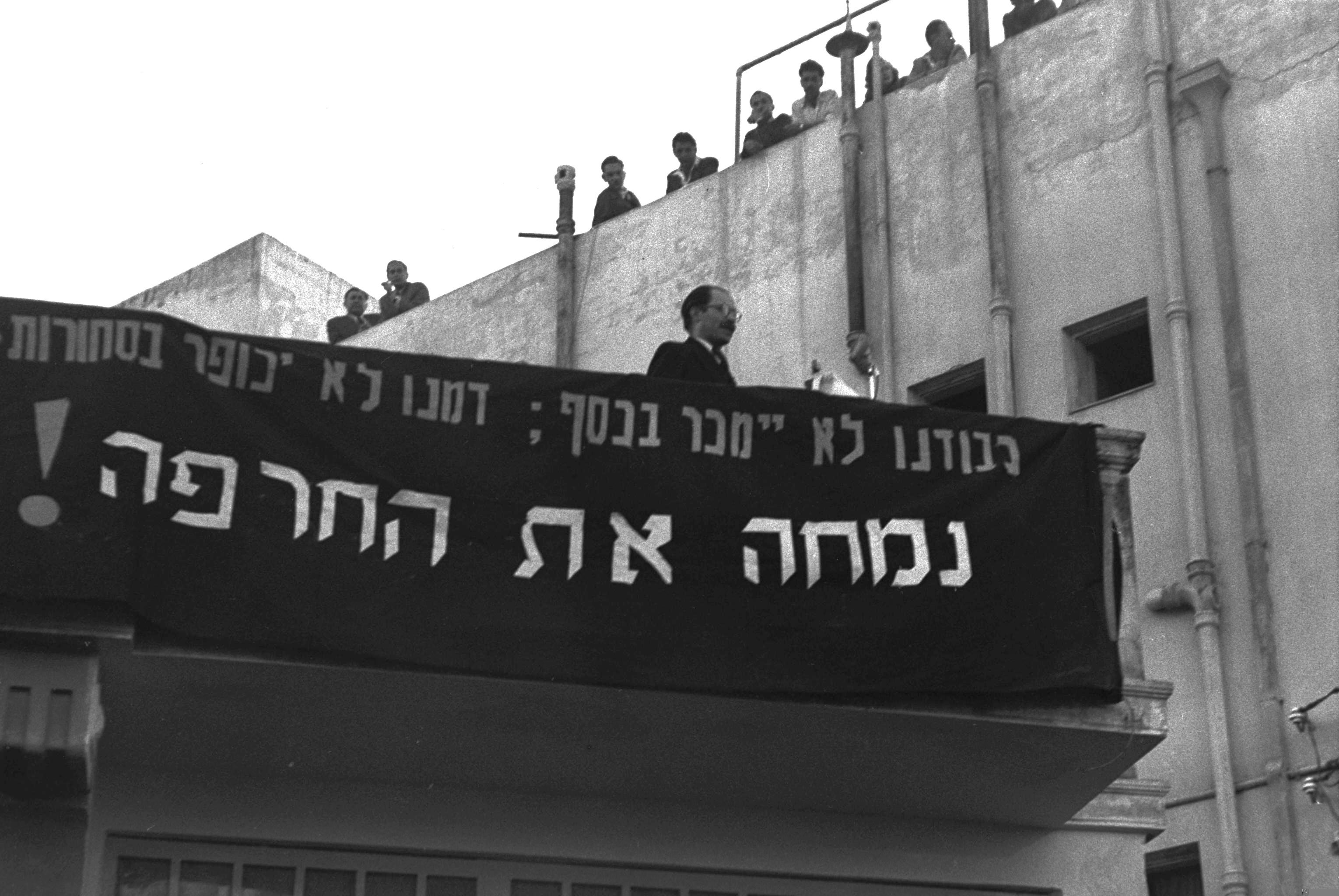
Menachem Begin addressing a mass demonstration in Tel Aviv against negotiations with Germany in 1952

Between 1948 and 1958, the population of Israel rose from 800,000 to two million. During this period, food, clothes and furniture had to be rationed in what became known as the Austerity Period (Tkufat haTsena). Immigrants were mostly refugees without money or possessions, and many were housed in temporary camps known as ma'abarot. By 1952 more than 200,000 immigrants were living in tents or prefabricated shacks built by the government. Israel received financial aid from private donations from outside the country (mainly the United States). The pressure on the new state's finances led Ben-Gurion to negotiate a controversial reparations agreement with West Germany. During the Knesset debate some 5,000 demonstrators gathered and riot police had to cordon the building.

In 1952, Israel and West Germany signed an agreement and over the next 14 years, West Germany paid Israel 3 billion marks (around US$714 million according to 1953–1955 conversion rates). The reparations became a decisive part of Israel's income, comprising as high as 87.5% of Israel's income in 1956. In 1950, the Israeli government launched Israel Bonds for American and Canadian Jews to buy. In 1951, the final results of the bonds program exceeded $52 million. In 1957, bond sales amounted to 35% of Israel's special development budget. The proceeds from these sources were invested in industrial and agricultural development projects, which allowed Israel to become economically self-sufficient. Among the projects made possible by the aid was the Hadera power plant, the Dead Sea Works, the National Water Carrier, port development in Haifa, Ashdod, and Eilat, desalination plants, and national infrastructure projects.

=== Education and culture ===
In 1949, education was made free and compulsory for all citizens until the age of 14. The state now funded the party-affiliated Zionist education system and a new body created by the Haredi Agudat Israel party. A separate body was created to provide education for the remaining Palestinian-Arab population. The major political parties now competed for immigrants to join their education systems. The government banned the existing educational bodies from the transit camps and tried to mandate a unitary secular socialist education under the control of "camp managers" who also had to provide work, food and housing for the immigrants. There were attempts to force orthodox Yemenite children to adopt a secular life style by teachers, including many instances of Yemenite children having their side-curls cut by teachers. The Yemenite Children Affair led to the first Israeli public inquiry (the Fromkin Inquiry), the collapse of the coalition, and an election in 1951, with little change in the results. In 1953 the party-affiliated education system was scrapped and replaced by a secular state education system and a state-run Modern Orthodox system. Agudat Israel were allowed to maintain their existing school system.

In the early 1950s, under the administration of Yaakov Dori, who had served as the Israel Defense Forces’ first chief of staff, the Technion launched a campaign to recruit Jewish and pro-Israel scientists from abroad to establish research laboratories and teaching departments in the natural and exact sciences.

The first works of Hebrew literature in Israel were written by immigrant authors rooted in the world and traditions of European Jewry. Yosef Haim Brenner (1881–1921) and Shmuel Yosef Agnon (1888–1970), are considered by many to be the fathers of modern Hebrew literature. Native-born writers who published their work in the 1940s and 1950s, often called the "War of Independence generation," brought a sabra mentality and culture to their writing. S. Yizhar, Moshe Shamir, Hanoch Bartov and Benjamin Tammuz vacillated between individualism and commitment to society and state.

=== International relations ===
In its early years Israel sought to maintain a non-aligned position between the super-powers. But in 1952 an antisemitic public trial was staged in Moscow in which a group of Jewish doctors were accused of trying to poison Stalin (the Doctors' plot), followed by a similar trial in Czechoslovakia (Slánský trial). This, and the failure of Israel to be included in the Bandung Conference (of non-aligned states), effectively ended Israel's pursuit of non-alignment. On 19 May 1950, in contravention of international law, Egypt announced that the Suez Canal would be closed to Israeli ships and commerce. In 1952 a military coup in Egypt brought Abdel Nasser to power. The United States pursued close relations with the new Arab states, particularly the Nasser-led Egyptian Free Officers Movement and Ibn Saud of Saudi Arabia. Israel's solution to diplomatic isolation was to establish good relations with newly independent states in Africa and with France, which was engaged in the Algerian War.

== Mid-1950s to early 1960s ==
=== Mid-1950s ===
In the January 1955 elections Mapai won 40 seats and the Labour Party 10, Moshe Sharett became prime minister of Israel at the head of a left-wing coalition. Between 1953 and 1956, there were intermittent clashes along all of Israel's borders as Arab terrorism and breaches of the ceasefire resulting in Israeli counter-raids. Palestinian fedayeen attacks, often organized and sponsored by the Egyptians, were made from (Egyptian) occupied Gaza. Fedayeen attacks led to a growing cycle of violence as Israel launched reprisal attacks against Gaza. In 1954 the Uzi submachine gun first entered use by the Israel Defense Forces. In 1955 the Egyptian government began recruiting former Nazi rocket scientists for a missile program.

Sharett's government was brought down by the Lavon Affair, a crude plan to disrupt US–Egyptian relations, involving Israeli agents planting bombs at American sites in Egypt. The plan failed when 11 agents were arrested. Defense Minister Lavon was blamed despite his denial of responsibility. The Lavon affair led to Sharett's resignation and Ben-Gurion returned to the post of prime minister.

=== Suez Crisis ===
In 1955 Egypt concluded a massive arms deal with Czechoslovakia, upsetting the balance of power in the Middle East. In 1956, the increasingly pro-Soviet President Nasser of Egypt, announced the nationalization of the (French and British owned) Suez Canal, which was Egypt's main source of foreign currency. Egypt also blockaded the Gulf of Aqaba preventing Israeli access to the Red Sea. Israel made a secret agreement with the French at Sèvres to co-ordinate military operations against Egypt. Britain and France had already begun secret preparations for military action. It has been alleged that the French also agreed to build a nuclear plant for the Israelis. Britain and France arranged for Israel to give them a pretext for seizing the Suez Canal. Israel was to attack Egypt, and Britain and France would then call on both sides to withdraw. When, as expected, the Egyptians refused, Anglo-French forces would invade to take control of the Canal.

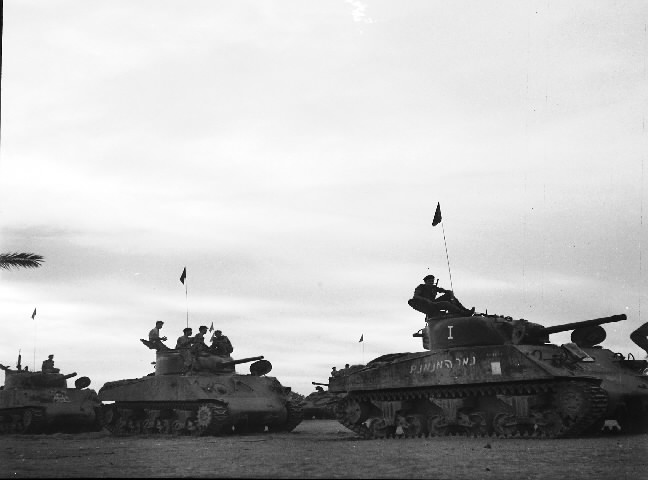
Israeli tank column advancing toward the Mitla Pass during Operation Kadesh

Israeli forces, commanded by General Moshe Dayan, attacked Egypt on 29 October 1956. On 30 October Britain and France made their pre-arranged call for both sides to stop fighting and withdraw from the Canal area, and for them to be allowed to take up positions at key points on the Canal. Egypt refused and the allies commenced air strikes on 31 October aimed at neutralizing the Egyptian air force. By 5 November the Israelis had overrun the Sinai. The Anglo-French invasion began that day. There was uproar in the UN, with the US and USSR for once in agreement in denouncing the actions of Israel, Britain, and France. A demand for a ceasefire was reluctantly accepted on 7 November.

At Egypt's request the UN sent an Emergency Force (UNEF), consisting of 6000 peacekeeping troops from 10 nations to supervise the ceasefire—the first ever UN peacekeeping operation. From 15 November the UN troops marked out a zone across the Sinai to separate the Israeli and Egyptian forces. Upon receiving US guarantees of Israeli access to the Suez Canal, freedom of access out of the Gulf of Aqaba and Egyptian action to stop Palestinian raids from Gaza, the Israelis withdrew to the Negev. In practice the Suez Canal remained closed to Israeli shipping. The conflict marked the end of West-European dominance in the Middle East.

Nasser emerged as the victor in the conflict, having won the political battle, but the Israeli military learnt that it did not need British or French support to conquer Sinai and that it could conquer the Sinai peninsula in a few days. The Israeli political leadership learnt that Israel had a limited time frame within which to operate militarily after which international political pressure would restrict Israel's freedom of action.

=== Late 1950s ===
In 1956, two modern-orthodox (and religious-Zionist) parties, Mizrachi and Hapoel HaMizrachi, joined to form the National Religious Party. The party was a component of every Israeli coalition until 1992, usually running the Ministry of Education. Mapai was once again victorious in the 1959 elections, increasing its number of seats to 47, Labour had 7. Ben-Gurion remained prime minister.

In 1959, there were renewed skirmishes along Israel's borders that continued throughout the early 1960s. The Arab League continued to widen its economic boycott and there was a dispute over water rights in the River Jordan basin. With Soviet backing, the Arab states, particularly Egypt, were continuing to build up their forces. Israel's main military hardware supplier was France.

=== Early 1960s ===
In 1961 a Herut no-confidence motion over the resurfaced Lavon Affair led to Ben-Gurion's resignation. Ben-Gurion declared that he would only accept office if Lavon was fired from the position of the head of Histadrut, Israel's labour union organization. His demands were accepted and Mapai won the 1961 election (42 seats keeping Ben-Gurion as PM) with a slight reduction in its share of the seats. Menachem Begin's Herut party and the Liberals came next with 17 seats each. In 1962 the Mossad began assassinating German rocket scientists working in Egypt after one of them reported the missile program was designed to carry chemical warheads. This action was condemned by Ben-Gurion and led to the Mossad director, Isser Harel, resignation. In 1963 Ben-Gurion quit again over the Lavon affair. His attempts to make his party Mapai support him over the issue failed. Levi Eshkol became leader of Mapai and the new prime minister.

Ben-Gurion quit Mapai to form the new party Rafi, he was joined by Shimon Peres and Moshe Dayan. Begin's Herut party joined with the Liberals to form Gahal. Mapai and Labour united for the 1965 elections, winning 45 seats and maintaining Levi Eshkol as prime minister. Ben-Gurion's Rafi party received 10 seats, Gahal gained 26 seats becoming the second largest party.

==== Trial of Eichmann ====
Trial of Adolf Eichmann

Rudolph Kastner, a minor political functionary, was accused of collaborating with the Nazis and sued his accuser. Kastner lost the trial and was assassinated two years later. In 1958 the Supreme Court exonerated him. In May 1960 Adolf Eichmann, one of the chief administrators of the Nazi Holocaust, was located in Argentina by the Mossad, later kidnapping him and bringing him to Israel. In 1961 he was put on trial, and after several months found guilty and sentenced to death. He was hanged in 1962 and is the only person ever sentenced to death by an Israeli court. Testimonies by Holocaust survivors at the trial and the extensive publicity that surrounded it has led the trial to be considered a turning point in public awareness of the Holocaust.

==== Renewed regional tensions ====
In 1963, Yigael Yadin began excavating Masada. In 1964 Egypt, Jordan, and Syria developed a unified military command. Israel completed work on a national water carrier, a huge engineering project designed to transfer Israel's allocation of the Jordan river's waters towards the south of the country in realization of Ben-Gurion's dream of mass Jewish settlement of the Negev desert. The Arabs responded by trying to divert the headwaters of the Jordan, leading to growing conflict between Israel and Syria.

Until 1966, Israel's principal arms supplier was France; but in 1966, following the withdrawal from Algeria, Charles de Gaulle announced France would cease supplying Israel with arms (and refused to refund money paid for 50 warplanes). On 5 February 1966, the US announced that it was taking over the former French and West German obligations, to maintain military "stabilization" in the Middle East. Included in the military hardware would be over 200 M48 tanks. In May of that year the US also agreed to provide A-4 Skyhawk tactical aircraft to Israel. In 1966 security restrictions placed on Arab-Israelis were eased and efforts made to integrate them into Israeli life.

In 1966, black and white TV broadcasts began. On 15 May 1967 the first public performance of Naomi Shemer's classic song "Jerusalem of Gold" took place and over the next few weeks it dominated the Israeli airwaves. Two days later Syria, Egypt, and Jordan amassed troops along the Israeli borders, and Egypt closed the Straits of Tiran to Israeli shipping. Nasser demanded that the UNEF leave Sinai, threatening escalation to a full war. Egyptian radio broadcasts talked of a coming genocide. On 26 May Nasser declared, "The battle will be a general one and our basic objective will be to destroy Israel". Israel considered the Straits of Tiran closure a Casus belli. Egypt, Syria, Jordan and Iraq signed defence pacts and Iraqi troops began deploying to Jordan, Syria and Egypt. Algeria also announced that it would send troops to Egypt. Between 1963 and 1967 Egyptian troops had tested chemical weapons on Yemenite civilians as part of an Egyptian intervention in support of rebels.

Israel responded by calling up its civilian reserves, bringing much of the Israeli economy to a halt. The Israelis set up a national unity coalition, including for the first time Menachem Begin's party, Herut, in a coalition. During a national radio broadcast, Prime Minister Levi Eshkol stammered, causing widespread fear in Israel. To calm public concern Moshe Dayan (Chief of Staff during the Sinai war) was appointed Defence Minister.

== Six-Day War ==
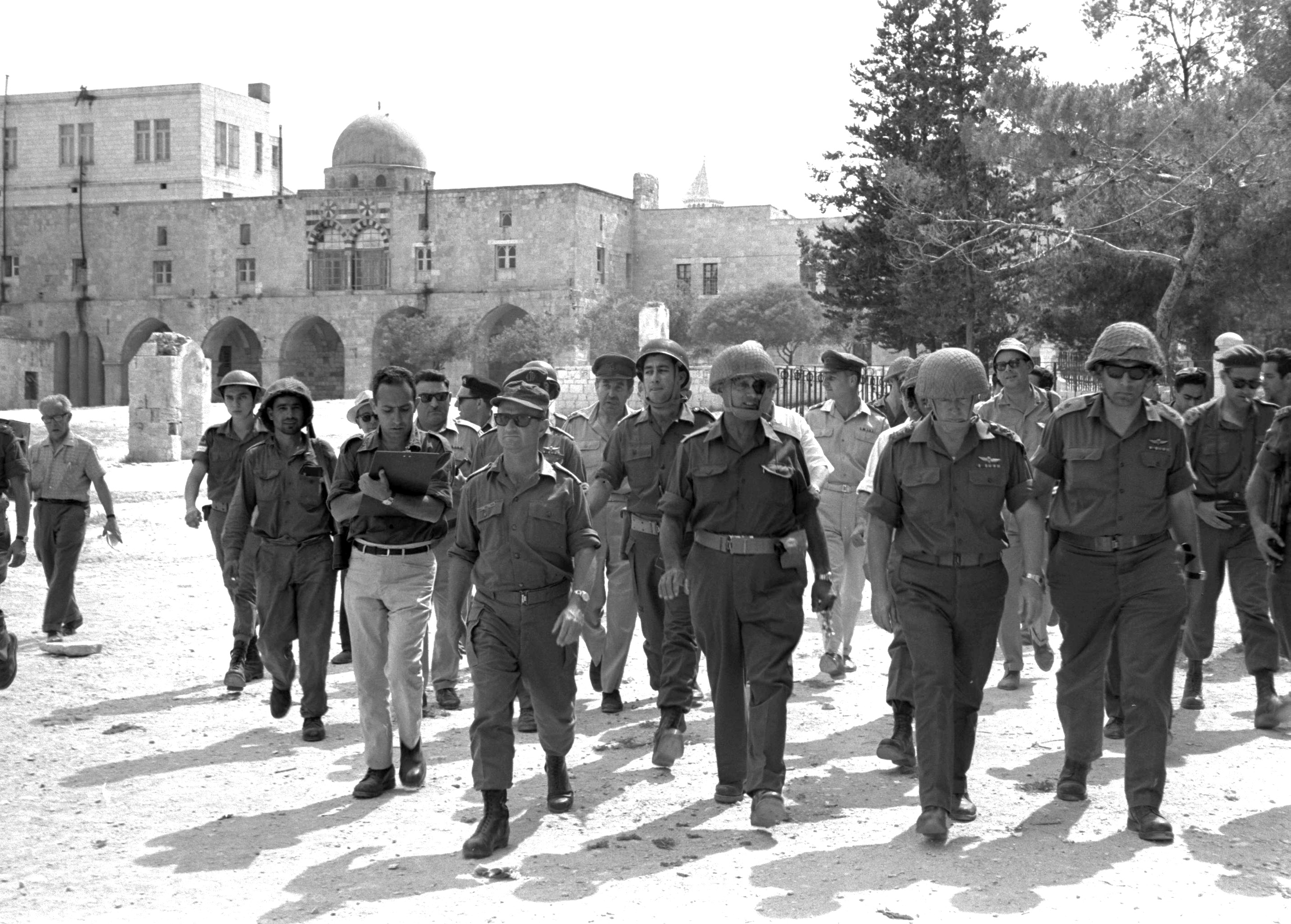
Gen. Uzi Narkiss, Defense Minister Moshe Dayan, Chief of staff Yitzhak Rabin and Gen. Rehavam Ze'evi in the Old City of Jerusalem, 7 June 1967

On the morning of 5 June 1967 the Israeli airforce launched pre-emptive attacks destroying first the Egyptian air force, and then later the same day destroying the air forces of Jordan and Syria. Israel then defeated (almost successively) Egypt, Jordan and Syria. By 11 June the Arab forces were routed and all parties had accepted the cease-fire called for by UN Security Council Resolutions 235 and 236. Israel gained control of the Sinai Peninsula, the Gaza Strip, the Golan Heights, and the formerly Jordanian-controlled West Bank of the Jordan River. East Jerusalem was arguably annexed by Israel. Residents were given permanent residency status and the option of applying for Israeli citizenship. The annexation was not recognized internationally (the Jordanian annexation of 1950 was also unrecognized except for the UK, Iraq, and Pakistan). Other areas occupied remained under military rule (Israeli civil law did not apply to them) pending a final settlement. The Golan was also annexed in 1981.

The result of the 29 August 1967 Arab League summit was the Khartoum Resolution, which according to Abd al Azim Ramadan, left only one option – a war with Israel. On 22 November 1967, the Security Council adopted Resolution 242, the "land for peace" formula, which called for the establishment of a just and lasting peace based on Israeli withdrawal from territories occupied in 1967 in return for the end of all states of belligerency, respect for the sovereignty of all states in the area, and the right to live in peace within secure, recognized boundaries. The resolution was accepted by both sides, though with different interpretations, and has been the basis of all subsequent peace negotiations.

== Late 1960s to early 1970s ==
=== Late 1960s ===
By the late sixties, about 500,000 Jews had left Algeria, Morocco and Tunisia. Over the course of twenty years, some 850,000 Jews from Arab countries (99%) relocated to Israel (680,000), France and the Americas. The land and property left behind by the Jews (much of it in Arab city centres) is still a matter of some dispute. Today there are about 9,000 Jews living in Arab states, of whom 75% live in Morocco and 15% in Tunisia. Vast assets, approximately $150 billion worth of goods and property (before inflation) were left behind in these countries.

After 1967 the Soviet bloc (except Romania) broke off relations with Israel. Antisemitic purges encouraged the remnants of Polish Jewry to move to Israel. Increased Soviet antisemitism and enthusiasm generated by the 1967 victory led to a wave of Soviet Jews applying to emigrate to Israel. Most Jews were refused exit visas and persecuted by the authorities. Some were arrested, becoming known as Prisoners of Zion.

As a result of Israel's victory in the Six-Day War, Jews could visit the Old City of Jerusalem and pray at the Western Wall (the holiest site in Judaism) for the first time since the end of the British Mandate, to which they had been denied access by the Jordanians in contravention of the 1949 Armistice agreement. The four-meter-wide public alley beside the Wall was expanded into a massive plaza and worshippers were allowed to sit, or use other furniture, for the first time in centuries. In Hebron, Jews gained access to the Cave of the Patriarchs (the second most holy site in Judaism) for the first time since the 14th century (previously Jews were only allowed to pray at the entrance). A third Jewish holy site, Rachel's Tomb, in Bethlehem, also became accessible. The Sinai oil fields made Israel self-sufficient in energy.

In 1968 Moshe Levinger led a group of Religious Zionists who created the first Jewish settlement, a town near Hebron called Kiryat Arba. There were no other religious settlements until after 1974. In March 1968 Israeli forces attacked the Palestinian militia, Fatah, at its base in the Jordanian town of Karameh. The attack was in response to land mines placed on Israeli roads. The Israelis retreated after destroying the camp; however, the Israelis sustained unexpectedly high casualties and the attack was not viewed as a success. Despite heavy casualties, the Palestinians claimed victory, while Fatah and the PLO (of which it formed part) became famous across the Arab world.

In 1968, Ben-Gurion's Rafi party merged with the Labour-Mapai alliance. Ben-Gurion remained outside as an independent. In 1968, compulsory education was extended until the age of 16 for all citizens (it had been 14) and the government embarked on an extensive program of integration in education. In the major cities children from mainly Sephardi/Mizrahi neighbourhoods were bused to newly established middle schools in better areas. The system remained in place until after 2000.

In early 1969 Levi Eshkol died in office of a heart attack and Golda Meir became prime minister with the largest percentage of the vote ever won by an Israeli party, winning 56 of the 120 seats after the 1969 election. Meir was the first female prime minister of Israel and the first woman to have headed a Middle Eastern state in modern times. Gahal retained its 26 seats, and was the second largest party.

==== War of Attrition ====
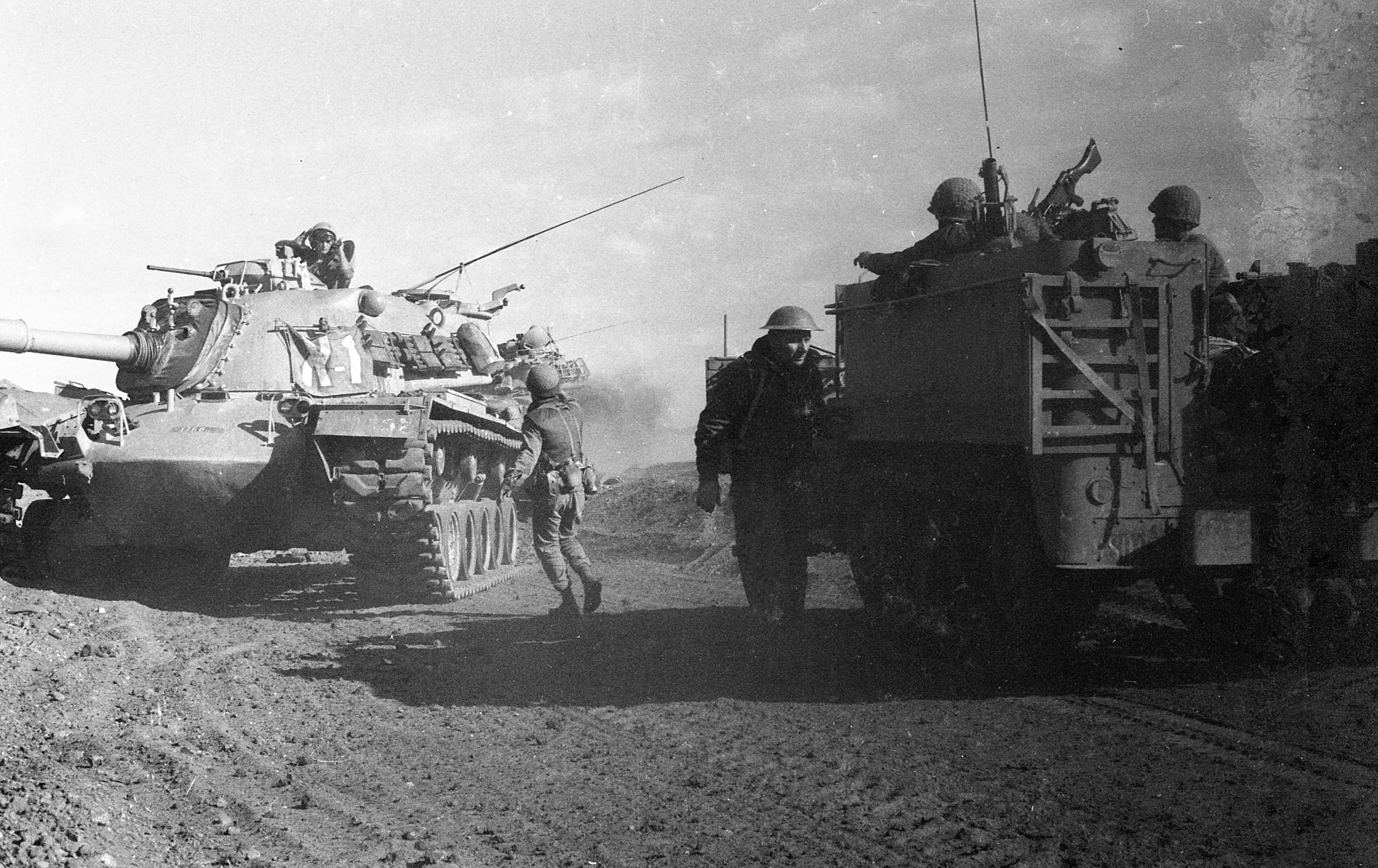
Israeli forces in the Suez canal area during the War of Attrition, 1969

In early 1969 fighting broke out between Egypt and Israel along the Suez Canal. In retaliation for repeated Egyptian shelling of Israeli positions along the Suez Canal, Israeli planes made deep strikes into Egypt in the 1969–1970 "War of Attrition". In December 1969, Israeli naval commandos took five missile boats during the night from Cherbourg Harbour in France. Israel had paid for the boats but the French had refused to supply them. In July 1970 the Israelis shot down five Soviet fighters that were aiding the Egyptians in the course of the War of Attrition. Following this, the US worked to calm the situation and in August 1970 a cease fire was agreed.

=== The early 1970s ===
During 1971 violent demonstrations by the Israeli Black Panthers, made the Israeli public aware of resentment among Mizrahi Jews at ongoing discrimination and social gaps. In 1972 the US Jewish Mafia leader, Meyer Lansky, who had taken refuge in Israel, was deported to the United States.

==== Black September ====
In September 1970 King Hussein of Jordan drove the Palestine Liberation Organization out of his country. On 18 September 1970, Syrian tanks invaded Jordan, intending to aid the PLO. At the request of the US, Israel moved troops to the border and threatened Syria, causing the Syrians to withdraw. The centre of PLO activity then shifted to Lebanon, where the 1969 Cairo Agreement gave the Palestinians autonomy within the south of the country. The area controlled by the PLO became known by the international press and locals as "Fatahland" and contributed to the 1975–1990 Lebanese Civil War. The event also led to Hafez al-Assad taking power in Syria. Egyptian President Nasser died of a heart attack immediately after and was succeeded by Anwar Sadat.

==== Munich massacre ====
At the 1972 Munich Olympics, two members of the Israeli team were killed and nine members taken hostage by Palestinian terrorists. A botched German rescue attempt led to the death of the rest along with five of the eight hijackers. The three surviving Palestinians were released by the West German authorities eight weeks later without charge, in exchange for the hostages of hijacked Lufthansa Flight 615. The Israeli government responded with an air raid, a raid on the PLO headquarters in Lebanon (led by future prime minister, Ehud Barak) and an assassination campaign against the organizers of the massacre.

== Yom Kippur War ==
In 1972 the new Egyptian President Anwar Sadat expelled the Soviet advisers from Egypt. This and frequent invasion exercises by Egypt and Syria led to Israeli complacency about the threat from these countries. In addition the desire not to be held responsible for initiating conflict and an election campaign highlighting security, led to an Israeli failure to mobilize, despite receiving warnings of an impending attack.

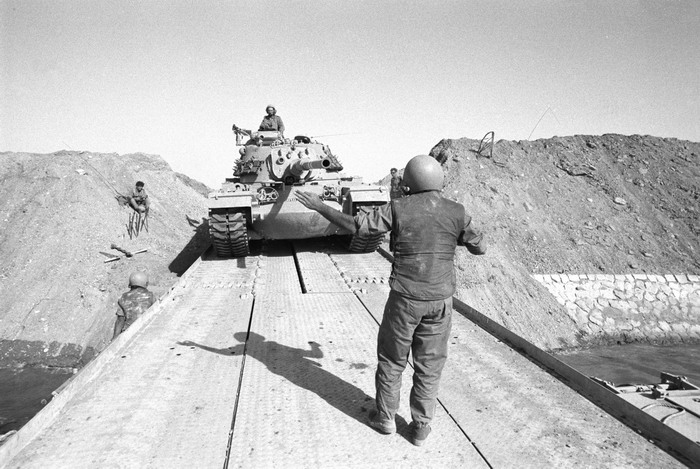
143rd Division crossing the Suez Canal in the direction of Cairo during the Yom Kippur War, 15 October 1973

The Yom Kippur War (also known as the October War) began on 6 October 1973 (Yom Kippur being a day when adult Jews are required to fast). The Syrian and Egyptian armies launched a well-planned surprise attack against the unprepared Israeli Defense Forces. For the first few days there was a great deal of uncertainty about Israel's capacity to repel the invaders. Both the Soviets and the Americans (at the orders of Henry Kissinger) rushed arms to their allies. The Syrians were repulsed by the tiny remnant of the Israeli tank force on the Golan and, although the Egyptians captured a strip of territory in Sinai, Israeli forces crossed the Suez Canal, trapping the Egyptian Third Army in Sinai and were 100 kilometres from Cairo. The war cost Israel over 2,000 dead, resulted in a heavy arms bill (for both sides) and made Israelis more aware of their vulnerability. It also led to heightened superpower tension. Following the war, both Israelis and Egyptians showed greater willingness to negotiate. On 18 January 1974, extensive diplomacy by US Secretary of State Henry Kissinger led to a Disengagement of Forces agreement with the Egyptian government and on 31 May with the Syrian government.

The war was the catalyst for the 1973 oil crisis, a Saudi-led oil embargo in conjunction with OPEC against countries trading with Israel. Severe shortages led to massive increases in the price of oil, and as a result, many countries broke off relations with Israel or downgraded relations, and Israel was banned from participation in the Asian Games and other Asian sporting events.

Following the war, prior to the December 1973 elections Gahal and a number of rightwing parties united to form the Likud (led by Begin). In the December 1973 elections, Labour won 51 seats, leaving Golda Meir as prime minister. The Likud won 39 seats.

In November 1974 the PLO was granted observer status at the UN and Yasser Arafat addressed the General Assembly. Later that year the Agranat Commission, appointed to assess responsibility for Israel's lack of preparedness for the war, exonerated the government of responsibility, and held the chief of staff and head of military intelligence responsible. Despite the report, public anger at the Government led to Golda Meir's resignation.

== Mid to late 1970s ==
=== The rise of religious Zionism ===
In 1974 Religious Zionist followers of the teachings of Abraham Isaac Kook formed the Gush Emunim movement, and began an organized drive to settle the West Bank and Gaza Strip. In November 1975, the United Nations General Assembly, under the guidance of Austrian Secretary General Kurt Waldheim, adopted Resolution 3379, which asserted Zionism to be a form of racism. The General Assembly rescinded this resolution in December 1991 with Resolution 46/86. In March 1976 there was a massive strike by Israeli-Arabs in protest at a government plan to expropriate land in the Galilee.

=== Late 1970s ===
Following Meir's resignation Yitzhak Rabin became prime minister. In July 1976, Rabin ordered Operation Entebbe to rescue kidnapped Jewish passengers from an Air France flight hijacked by PFLP militants and German revolutionaries and flown to Uganda. In January 1977, French authorities arrested Abu Daoud, the planner of the Munich massacre, releasing him a few days later. In March 1977 Anatoly Sharansky, a prominent Refusenik and spokesman for the Moscow Helsinki Group, was sentenced to 13 years' hard labour.

Rabin resigned in April 1977 after it emerged that his wife maintained a dollar account in the US (illegal at the time), which had been opened while Rabin was Israeli ambassador. The incident became known as the Dollar Account affair. Shimon Peres informally replaced him as prime minister, leading the Alignment in the subsequent elections.

==== The rise of Likud ====
In a surprise result, the Likud led by Menachem Begin won 43 seats in the 1977 elections (Labour won 32 seats). This was the first time in Israeli history that the government was not led by the left. A key reason for the victory was anger among Mizrahi Jews at discrimination, which was to play an important role in Israeli politics for many years. Talented small town Mizrahi social activists, unable to advance in the Labour party, were readily embraced by Begin. Moroccan-born David Levy and Iranian-born Moshe Katzav were part of a group who won Mizrahi support for Begin. Many Labour voters voted for the Democratic Movement for Change (15 seats) in protest at high-profile corruption cases. The party joined in coalition with Begin and disappeared at the next election.

In addition to starting a process of healing the Mizrahi–Ashkenazi divide, Begin's government included Ultra-Orthodox Jews and was instrumental in healing the Zionist–Ultra-Orthodox rift.

Begin's liberalization of the economy led to hyper-inflation (around 150%) but enabled Israel to begin receiving US financial aid. Begin actively supported Gush Emunim's efforts to settle the West Bank and Jewish settlements in the occupied territories received government support, thus laying the grounds for intense conflict with the Palestinian population of the occupied territories.

In November 1977 Egyptian President Anwar Sadat broke 30 years of hostility with Israel by visiting Jerusalem at the invitation of Israeli Prime Minister Menachem Begin. Sadat's two-day visit included a speech before the Knesset and was a turning point in the history of the conflict. The Egyptian leader created a new psychological climate in the Middle East in which peace between Israel and its Arab neighbours seemed possible. Sadat recognized Israel's right to exist and established the basis for direct negotiations between Egypt and Israel. Following Sadat's visit, 350 Yom Kippur War veterans organized the Peace Now movement to encourage Israeli governments to make peace with the Arabs.

In March 1978 eleven armed Lebanese Palestinians reached Israel in boats and hijacked a bus carrying families on a day outing, killing 38 people, including 13 children. The attackers opposed the Egyptian–Israeli peace process. Three days later Israeli forces crossed into Lebanon beginning Operation Litani. After passage of United Nations Security Council Resolution 425, calling for Israeli withdrawal and the creation of the United Nations Interim Force in Lebanon (UNIFIL) peace-keeping force, Israel withdrew its troops.

==== Camp David Accords ====
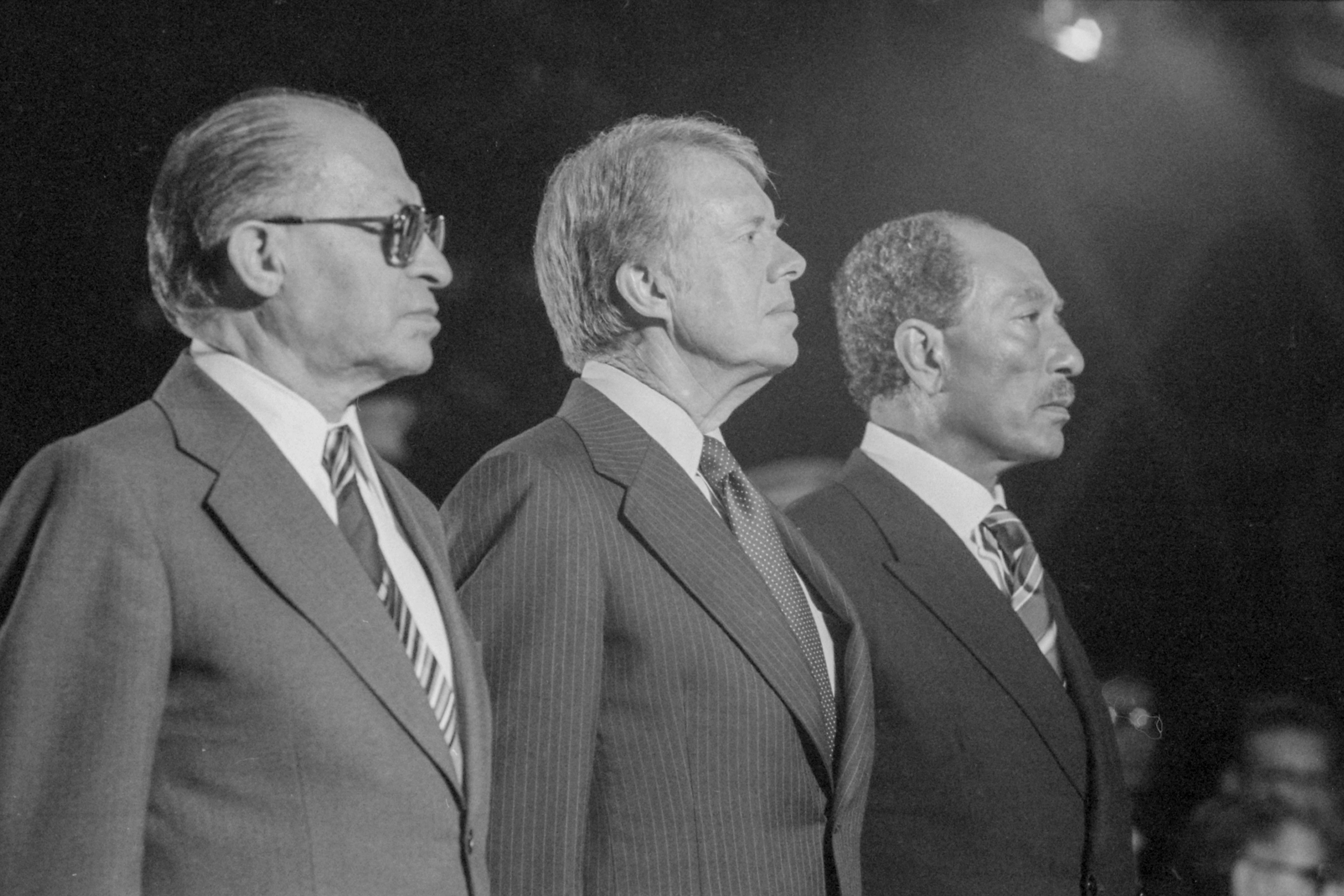
Menachem Begin, Jimmy Carter and Anwar Sadat celebrating the signing of the Camp David Accords

In September 1978 US president Jimmy Carter invited president Sadat and prime minister Begin to meet with him at Camp David; on 11 September they agreed on a framework for peace between Israel and Egypt, and a comprehensive peace in the Middle East. It set out broad principles to guide negotiations between Israel and the Arab states. It also established guidelines for a West Bank–Gaza transitional regime of full autonomy for the Palestinians residing in these territories, and for a peace treaty between Egypt and Israel. The treaty was signed 26 March 1979 by Begin and Sadat, with Carter signing as witness. Under the treaty, Israel returned the Sinai peninsula to Egypt in April 1982. The Arab League reacted to the peace treaty by suspending Egypt from the organization and moving its headquarters from Cairo to Tunis. Sadat was assassinated in 1981 by Islamic fundamentalist members of the Egyptian army who opposed peace with Israel. Following the agreement, Israel and Egypt became the two largest recipients of US military and financial aid (Iraq and Afghanistan have now overtaken them).

In December 1978 the Israeli Merkava battle tank entered use with the IDF. In 1979 more than 40,000 Iranian Jews migrated to Israel to escape the Islamic Revolution.

== Early to mid-1980s ==
On 30 June 1981, the Israeli air force destroyed the Osirak nuclear reactor that France was building for Iraq. Three weeks later, Begin won again in the 1981 elections (48 seats Likud, 47 Labour), and Ariel Sharon was made defence minister. The new government annexed the Golan Heights and banned the national airline from flying on Shabbat. By the 1980s a diverse set of high-tech industries had developed in Israel.

=== 1982 Lebanon War ===
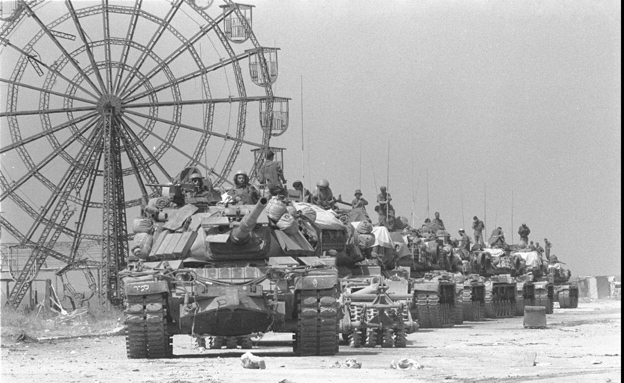
Israeli Patton tanks during Operation Peace for Galilee in 1982

In the decades following the 1948 war, Israel's border with Lebanon was quiet compared with its borders with other neighbours. But the 1969 Cairo agreement gave the PLO a free hand to attack Israel from South Lebanon. The area was governed by the PLO independently of the Lebanese Government and became known as "Fatahland" (Fatah was the largest faction in the PLO). Palestinian irregulars constantly shelled the Israeli north, especially the town of Kiryat Shmona, which was a Likud stronghold inhabited primarily by Jews who had fled the Arab world. Lack of control over Palestinian areas was an important factor in causing civil war in Lebanon.

In June 1982, the attempted assassination of Shlomo Argov, the ambassador to Britain, was used as a pretext for an Israeli invasion aiming to drive the PLO out of the southern half of Lebanon. Sharon agreed with Chief of Staff Raphael Eitan to expand the invasion deep into Lebanon even though the cabinet had only authorized a 40-kilometre deep invasion. The invasion became known as the 1982 Lebanon War and the Israeli army occupied Beirut, the only time an Arab capital has been occupied by Israel. Some of the Shia and Christian population of South Lebanon welcomed the Israelis, as PLO forces had maltreated them, but Lebanese resentment of Israeli occupation grew over time and the Shia became gradually radicalized under Iranian guidance. Constant casualties among Israeli soldiers and Lebanese civilians led to growing opposition to the war in Israel.

In August 1982, the PLO withdrew its forces from Lebanon (moving to Tunisia). Bashir Gemayel was elected President of Lebanon, and reportedly agreed to recognize Israel and sign a peace treaty. However, Gemayal was assassinated before an agreement could be signed, and one day later Phalangist Christian forces led by Elie Hobeika entered two Palestinian refugee camps and massacred the occupants. The massacres led to the biggest demonstration ever in Israel against the war, with as many as 400,000 people (almost 10% of the population) gathering in Tel Aviv. In 1983, an Israeli public inquiry found that Israel's defence minister, Sharon, was indirectly but personally responsible for the massacres. It also recommended that he never again be allowed to hold the post (it did not forbid him from being prime minister). In 1983 the May 17 Agreement was signed between Israel and Lebanon, paving the way for an Israeli withdrawal from Lebanese territory through a few stages. Israel continued to operate against the PLO until its eventual departure in 1985, and kept a small force stationed in Southern Lebanon in support of the South Lebanon Army until May 2000.

=== 1983 Israel bank stock crisis ===
The bank stock crisis was a financial crisis that occurred in Israel in 1983, during which the stocks of the four largest banks in Israel collapsed. In previous episodes of share price weakness, the banks bought back their own stocks, creating the appearance of constant demand for the stock, and artificially supporting their values. By October 1983, the banks no longer had the capital to buy back shares and to support the prices causing share prices to collapse. The Tel Aviv Stock Exchange closed for eighteen days beginning October 6, 1983

The immediate consequences of the crisis were the loss of a third of the public's investments in the banks, the acquisition of the banks by the government at a total cost of $6.9 billion (for reference, Israel's entire GDP in 1983 was about $27 billion), and the nationalization of the major banks (Leumi, Hapoalim, HaMizrachi, Discount, and Clali).

Executives of each of the banks were convicted of criminal charges. Raphael Recanati of Discount Bank and Mordechai Einhorn of Bank Leumi were both sentenced to 8-month prison terms. Recanati's sentence was suspended on appeal when one of five charges was quashed. As part of the settlement, the controlling interest in Discount Bank, as well as the other banks, was ceded to the government.

=== The mid-1980s ===
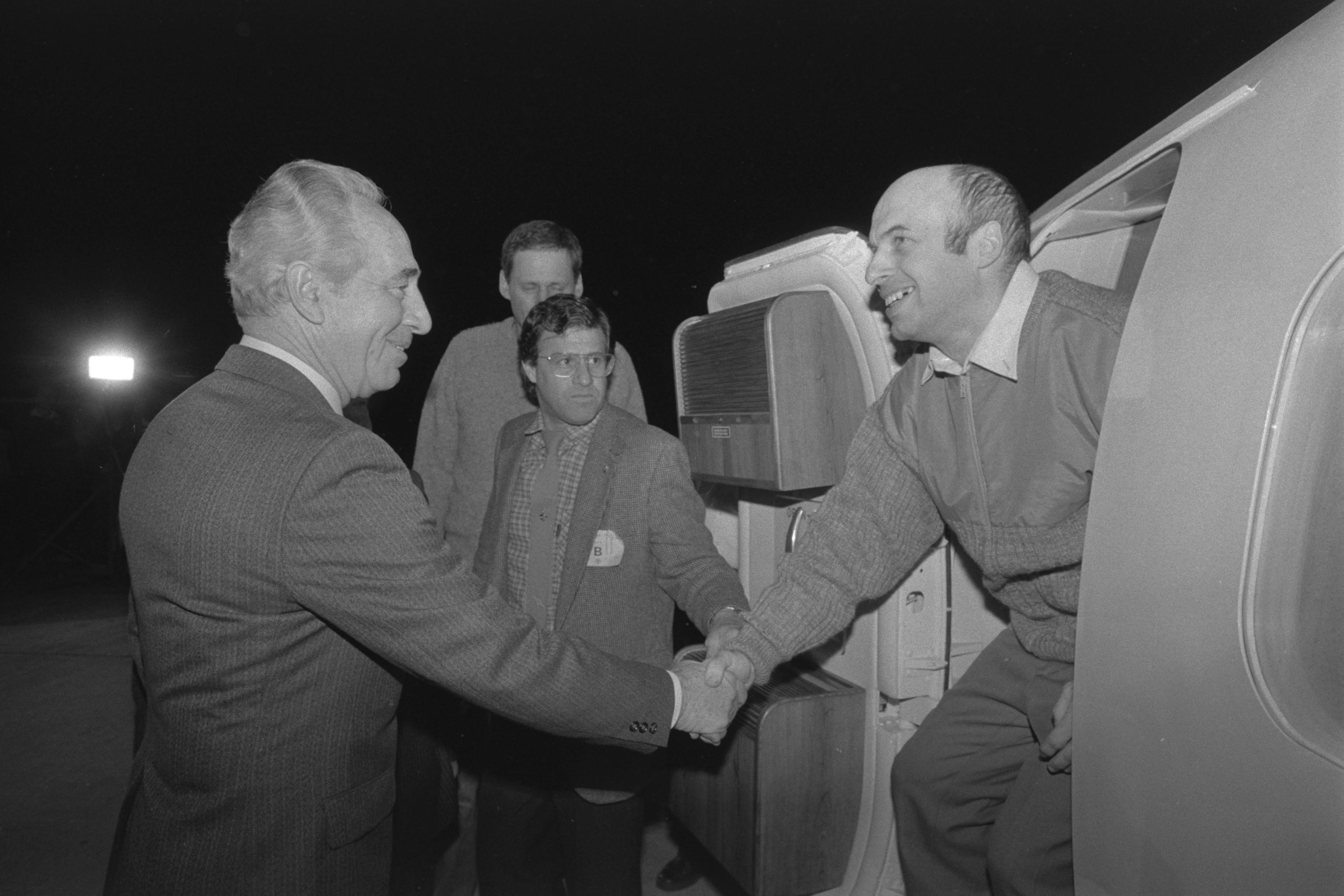
Anatoly Sharansky meeting then-Prime Minister Shimon Peres after his release from the Soviet Union

In September 1983 Begin resigned and was succeeded by Yitzhak Shamir as prime minister. The 1984 election was inconclusive, and led to a power sharing agreement between Shimon Peres of the Alignment (44 seats) and Shamir of Likud (41 seats). Peres was prime minister from 1984 to 1986 and Shamir from 1986 to 1988. In 1984, continual discrimination against Sephardi Ultra-Orthodox Jews by the Ashkenazi Ultra-Orthodox establishment led political activist Aryeh Deri to leave the Agudat Israel party and join former chief Rabbi Ovadia Yosef in forming Shas, a new party aimed at the non-Ashkenazi Ultra-Orthodox vote. The party won 4 seats in the first election it contested and over the next twenty years was the third largest party in the Knesset. Shas established a nationwide network of free Sephardi Orthodox schools.

In 1984, during a severe famine in Ethiopia, 8,000 Ethiopian Jews were secretly transported to Israel. By July 1985 Israel's inflation, buttressed by complex index linking of salaries, had reached 480% per annum and was the highest in the world. Peres introduced emergency control of prices and cut government expenditure successfully bringing inflation under control. The currency (known as the old Israeli shekel) was replaced and renamed the Israeli new shekel at a rate of 1,000 old shkalim = 1 new shekel. In October 1985 Israel responded to a Palestinian terrorist attack in Cyprus by bombing the PLO headquarters in Tunis. In 1986 Natan Sharansky, a famous Russian human rights activist and Zionist refusenik, was released from the prison in return for two Soviet spies.

=== South Lebanon conflict ===
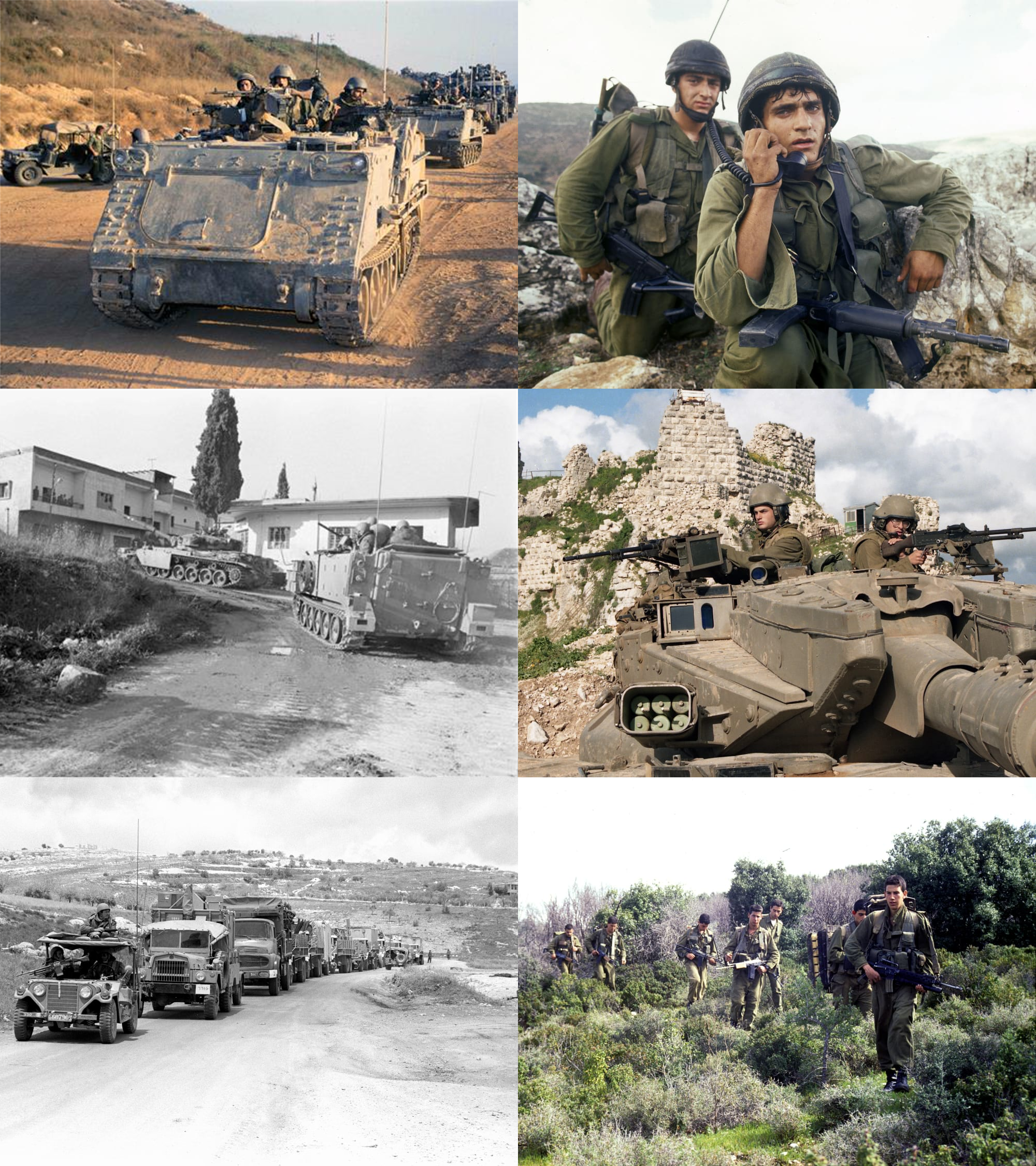
Montage of Israeli troops in southern Lebanon

In June 1985 Israel partially withdrew from Lebanon, leaving a residual Israeli force and an Israeli-supported militia in southern Lebanon as a "security zone" and buffer against attacks on its northern territory. The partial withdrawal did not end the conflict, however, but drew the IDF back into a conflict in South Lebanon with the Shia organization Hezbollah, which became a growing threat to Israel. From 1985 to 2000, the protracted armed conflict saw fighting between the Christian-dominated South Lebanon Army (SLA) and Hezbollah-led Muslim guerrillas within the Israeli-occupied "Security Zone".

With no clear end-game in Lebanon, the Israeli military was unfamiliar with the type of warfare that Hezbollah waged, and while it could inflict losses on Hezbollah, there was no long-term strategy. With Hezbollah increasingly targeting the Galilee with rockets, the official purpose of the Security Zone—to protect Israel's northern communities—seemed contradictory. Hezbollah also excelled at psychological warfare, often recording their attacks on Israeli troops. Following the 1997 Israeli helicopter disaster, the Israeli public began to seriously question whether the military occupation of southern Lebanon was worth maintaining. The Four Mothers movement rose to the forefront of the public discourse, and played a leading role in swaying the public in favour of a complete withdrawal, which would be completed in 2000.

== First Intifada ==
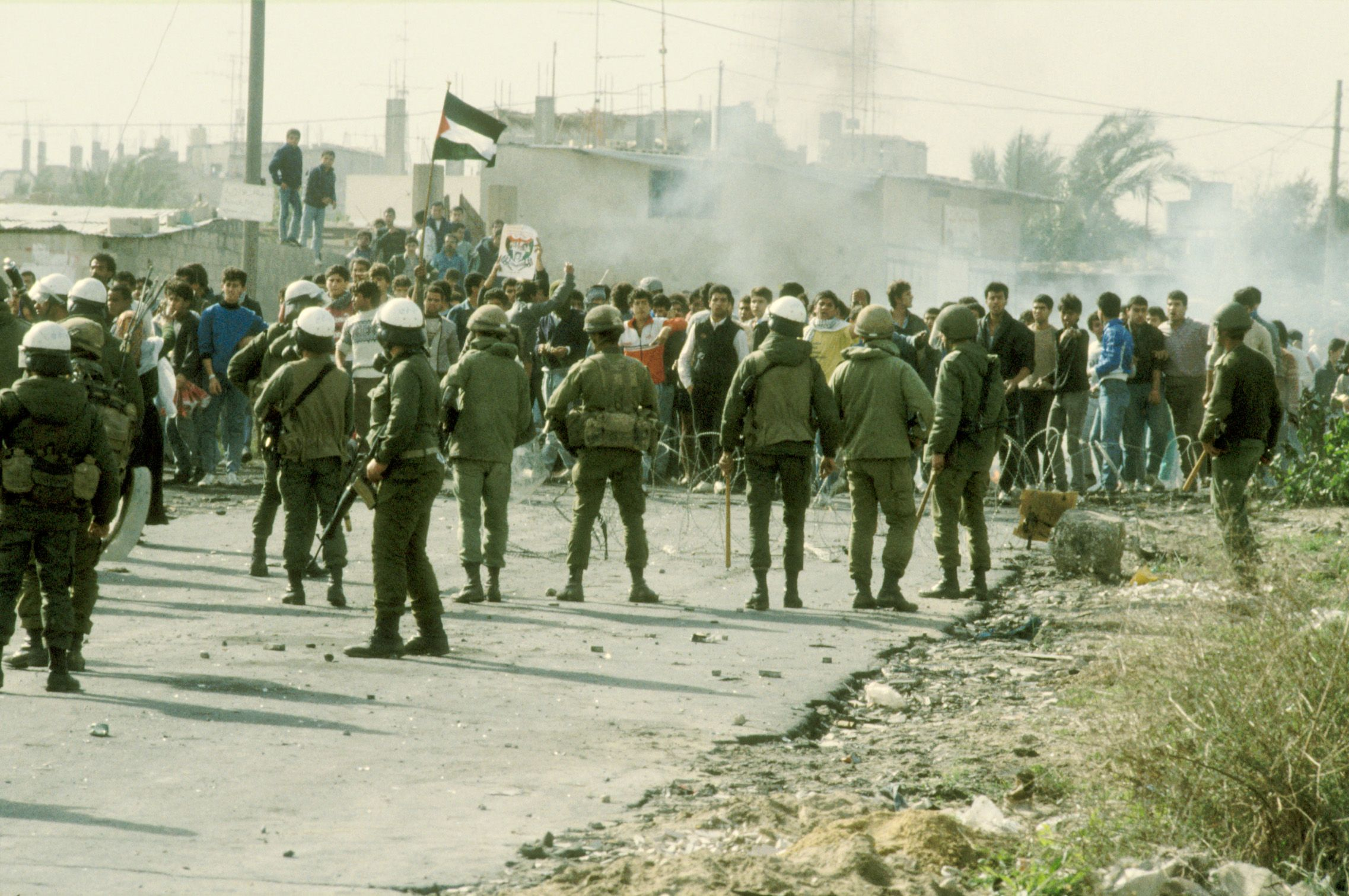
Israeli soldiers and protesters in Gaza during the Intifada

Growing Israeli settlement and continuing occupation of the West Bank and Gaza Strip led to the 1987 First Intifada, motivated by collective Palestinian frustration over Israel's military occupation of the West Bank and the Gaza Strip as it approached a twenty-year mark. The intifada began on 9 December 1987, when an Israeli Defense Forces' (IDF) truck collided with a civilian car in the Jabalia refugee camp, killing four Palestinian workers. Palestinians charged that the collision was a deliberate reprisal killing, while Israel denied that the crash, which came at time of heightened tensions, was intentional or coordinated.

The Palestinian response was characterized by protests, civil disobedience, and violence. There was graffiti, barricading, and widespread throwing of stones and Molotov cocktails at the IDF and its infrastructure within the West Bank and Gaza Strip. These contrasted with civil efforts including general strikes, boycotts of Israeli Civil Administration institutions in the Gaza Strip and the West Bank, an economic boycott consisting of refusal to work in Israeli settlements on Israeli products, refusal to pay taxes, and refusal to drive Palestinian cars with Israeli licenses. Israel deployed some 80,000 soldiers in response. Israeli countermeasures, which initially included the use of live rounds frequently in cases of riots, were criticized as disproportionate. The IDF's rules of engagement were also criticized as too liberally employing lethal force. Israel argued that violence from Palestinians necessitated a forceful response. In the first 13 months, 332 Palestinians and 12 Israelis were killed. Images of soldiers beating adolescents with clubs then led to the adoption of firing semi-lethal plastic bullets.

In the intifada's first year, Israeli security forces killed 311 Palestinians, of which 53 were under the age of 17. Over six years the IDF killed an estimated 1,162–1,204 Palestinians. Among Israelis, 100 civilians and 60 IDF personnel were killed often by militants outside the control of the Intifada's UNLU, and more than 1,400 Israeli civilians and 1,700 soldiers were injured. Intra-Palestinian violence was also a prominent feature of the Intifada, with widespread executions of an estimated 822 Palestinians killed as alleged Israeli collaborators (1988–April 1994). At the time Israel reportedly obtained information from some 18,000 Palestinians who had been compromised, although fewer than half had any proven contact with the Israeli authorities. Human rights abuses by Israeli troops led a group of Israelis to form B'Tselem, an organization devoted to improving awareness and compliance with human rights requirements in Israel.

The period of sustained protests and violent riots carried out by Palestinians in the Palestinian territories and Israel would last until the Madrid Conference of 1991, though some date its conclusion to 1993 and the signing of the Oslo Accords.

== Late 1980s to early 2000s ==
=== Late 1980s ===
In September 1988 Israel launched an Ofeq reconnaissance satellite into orbit, using a Shavit rocket, thus becoming one of only eight countries possessing a capacity to independently launch satellites into space (two more have since developed this ability). The Alignment and Likud remained neck and neck in the 1988 elections (39:40 seats). Shamir successfully formed a national unity coalition with the Labour Alignment. In March 1990 Alignment leader Shimon Peres engineered a defeat of the government in a non-confidence vote and then tried to form a new government. He failed and Shamir became prime minister at the head of a right-wing coalition.

=== Gulf War ===
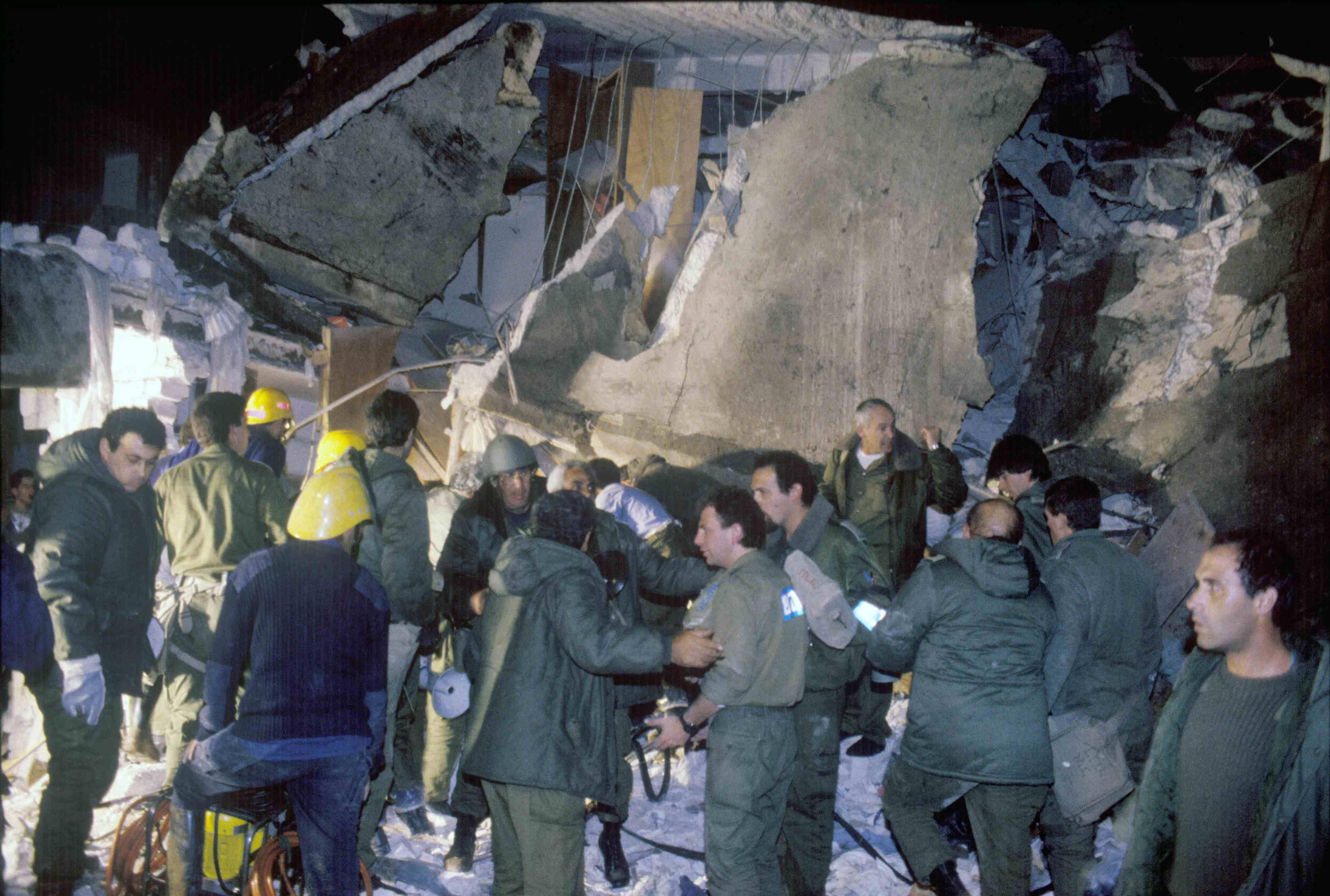
Aftermath of a Scud missile attack in Ramat Gan

In August 1990 Iraq invaded Kuwait, triggering the Gulf War between Iraq and a large allied force, led by the United States. Iraq attacked Israel with 39 Scud missiles. Israel did not retaliate at request of the US, fearing that if Israel responded against Iraq, other Arab nations might desert the allied coalition. Israel provided gas masks for both the Palestinian population and Israeli citizens, while Netherlands and the United States deployed Patriot defence batteries in Israel as protection against the Scuds. In May 1991, during a 36-hour period, 15,000 Beta Israel (Ethiopian Jews) were secretly airlifted to Israel. The coalition's victory in the Gulf War opened new possibilities for regional peace, and in October 1991 the US president, George H. W. Bush, and Soviet Union Premier, Mikhail Gorbachev, jointly convened a historic meeting in Madrid of Israeli, Lebanese, Jordanian, Syrian, and Palestinian leaders. Shamir opposed the idea but agreed in return for loan guarantees to help with absorption of immigrants from the former Soviet Union. His participation in the conference led to the collapse of his (right-wing) coalition. Soviet authorities finally permitted free emigration of Soviet Jews to Israel. Prior to this, Jews trying to leave the USSR faced persecution; those who succeeded arrived as refugees. Over the next few years some one million Soviet citizens migrated to Israel. Although there was concern that some of the new immigrants had only a very tenuous connection to Judaism, and many were accompanied by non-Jewish relatives, this massive wave of migration slowly transformed Israel, bringing large numbers of highly educated Soviet Jews and creating a powerful Russian culture in Israel.

=== Oslo Accords ===
In the 1992 elections, the Labour Party, led by Yitzhak Rabin, won a significant victory (44 seats) promising to pursue peace while promoting Rabin as a "tough general" and pledging not to deal with the PLO in any way. The left Zionist party Meretz won 12 seats, and the Arab and communist parties a further 5, meaning that parties supporting a peace treaty had a full (albeit small) majority in the Knesset. Later that year, the Israeli electoral system was changed to allow for direct election of the prime minister. It was hoped this would reduce the power of small parties to extract concessions in return for coalition agreements. The new system had the opposite effect; voters could split their vote for prime minister from their (interest based) party vote, and as a result larger parties won fewer votes and smaller parties becoming more attractive to voters. It thus increased the power of the smaller parties. By the 2006 election the system was abandoned.

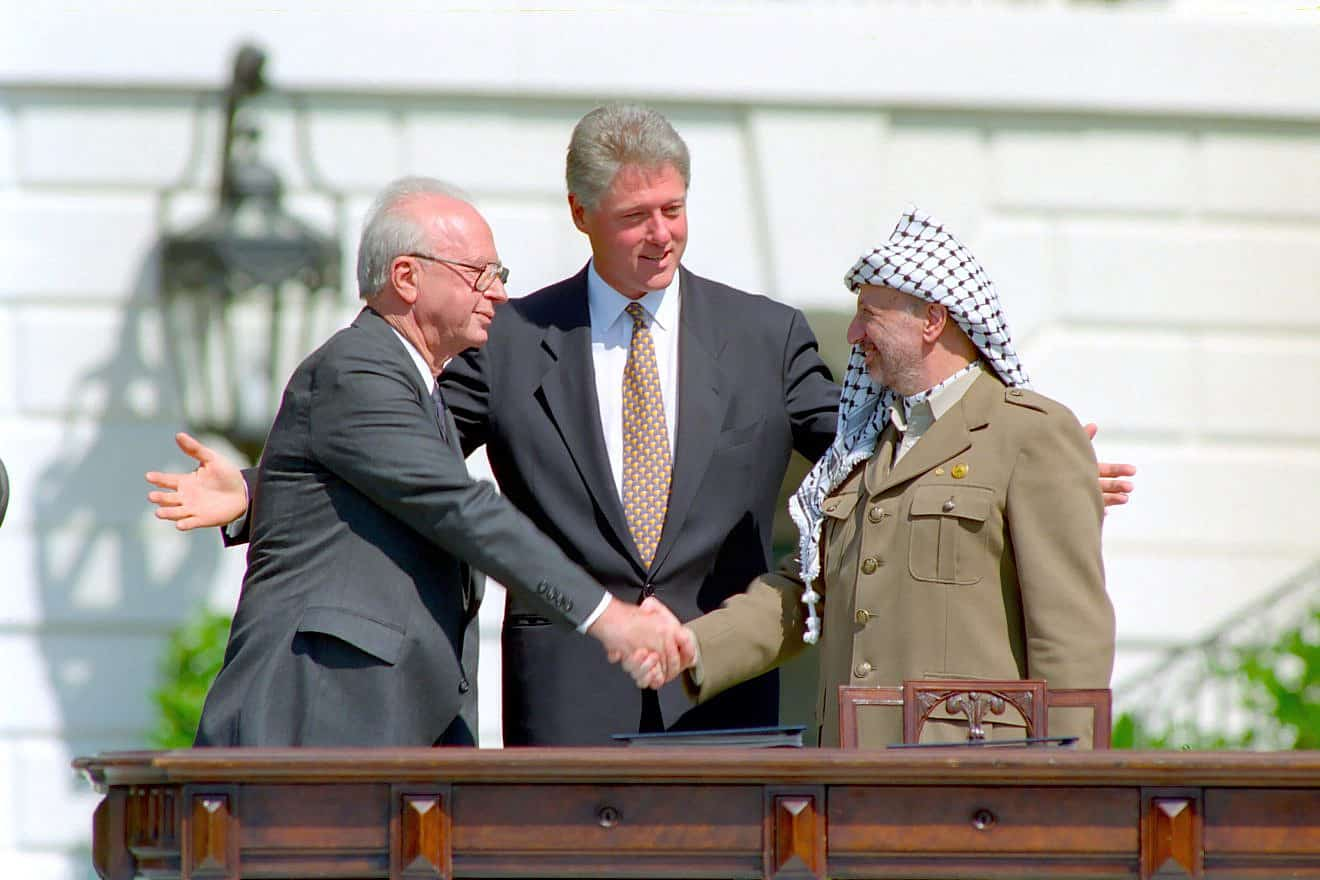
Yitzhak Rabin, Bill Clinton, and Yasser Arafat during the Oslo Accords signing ceremony at the White House on 13 September 1993

On 25 July 1993 Israel carried out a week-long military operation in Lebanon to attack Hezbollah positions. On 13 September 1993, Israel and the Palestine Liberation Organization (PLO) signed the Oslo Accords (a Declaration of Principles) on the South Lawn of the White House. The principles established objectives relating to a transfer of authority from Israel to an interim Palestinian Authority, as a prelude to a final treaty establishing a Palestinian state, in exchange for mutual recognition. The DOP established May 1999 as the date by which a permanent status agreement for the West Bank and Gaza Strip would take effect. In February 1994, Baruch Goldstein, a follower of the Kach party, killed 29 Palestinians and wounded 125 at the Cave of the Patriarchs in Hebron, which became known as the Cave of the Patriarchs massacre. Kach had been barred from participation in the 1992 elections (on the grounds that the movement was racist). It was subsequently made illegal. Israel and the PLO signed the Gaza–Jericho Agreement in May 1994, and the Agreement on Preparatory Transfer of Powers and Responsibilities in August, which began the process of transferring authority from Israel to the Palestinians. On 25 July 1994 Jordan and Israel signed the Washington Declaration, which formally ended the state of war that had existed between them since 1948 and on 26 October the Israel–Jordan Treaty of Peace, witnessed by US president Bill Clinton.

Prime minister Yitzhak Rabin and PLO chairman Yasser Arafat signed the Israeli–Palestinian Interim Agreement on the West Bank and the Gaza Strip on 28 September 1995 in Washington. The agreement was witnessed by president Bill Clinton on behalf of the United States and by Russia, Egypt, Norway and the EU, and incorporates and supersedes the previous agreements, marking the conclusion of the first stage of negotiations between Israel and the PLO. The agreement allowed the PLO leadership to relocate to the occupied territories and granted autonomy to the Palestinians, with talks to follow regarding final status. In return the Palestinians promised to abstain from use of terror and changed the Palestinian National Covenant, which had called for the expulsion of all Jews who migrated after 1917 and the elimination of Israel.

The agreement was opposed by Hamas and other Palestinian factions, which launched suicide bomber attacks at Israel. Rabin had a barrier constructed around Gaza to prevent attacks. The growing separation between Israel and the "Palestinian Territories" led to a labour shortage in Israel, mainly in the construction industry. Israeli firms began importing labourers from the Philippines, Thailand, China and Romania; some of these labourers stayed on without visas. In addition, a growing number of Africans began illegally migrating to Israel. On 4 November 1995, a far-right-wing religious Zionist opponent of the Oslo Accords assassinated Prime Minister Yitzhak Rabin. In February 1996 Rabin's successor, Shimon Peres, called early elections. In April 1996, Israel launched an operation in southern Lebanon as a result of Hezbollah's Katyusha rocket attacks on Israeli population centres along the border.

=== Late 1990s ===
The May 1996 elections were the first featuring direct election of the prime minister and resulted in a narrow election victory for Likud leader Binyamin Netanyahu. A spate of suicide bombings reinforced the Likud position for security. Hamas claimed responsibility for most of the bombings. Despite his stated differences with the Oslo Accords, Prime Minister Netanyahu continued their implementation, but his prime ministership saw a marked slow-down in the Peace Process. Netanyahu also pledged to gradually reduce US aid to Israel.

In September 1996, a Palestinian riot broke out against the creation of an exit in the Western Wall tunnel. Over the subsequent few weeks, around 80 people were killed as a result. In January 1997 Netanyahu signed the Hebron Protocol with the Palestinian Authority, resulting in the redeployment of Israeli forces in Hebron and the turnover of civilian authority in much of the area to the Palestinian Authority.

In the election of July 1999, Ehud Barak of the Labour Party became prime minister. His party was the largest in the Knesset with 26 seats. In September 1999 the Supreme Court of Israel ruled that the use of torture in interrogation of Palestinian prisoners was illegal. On 21 March 2000, Pope John Paul II arrived in Israel for an historic visit.

=== Early 2000s ===
On 25 May 2000, Israel unilaterally withdrew its remaining forces from the "security zone" in southern Lebanon. Several thousand members of the South Lebanon Army (and their families) left with the Israelis. The UN Secretary-General concluded that, as of 16 June 2000, Israel had withdrawn its forces from Lebanon in accordance with UN Security Council Resolution 425. Lebanon claims that Israel continues to occupy Lebanese territory called "Sheba'a Farms" (however this area was governed by Syria until 1967 when Israel took control). The Sheba'a Farms provided Hezbollah with a pretext to maintain warfare with Israel. The Lebanese government, in contravention of the UN Security Council resolution, did not assert sovereignty in the area, which came under Hezbollah control. In the Fall of 2000, talks were held at Camp David to reach a final agreement on the Israel/Palestine conflict. Ehud Barak offered to meet most of the Palestinian teams requests for territory and political concessions, including Arab parts of east Jerusalem; however, Arafat abandoned the talks without making a counterproposal.

Following its withdrawal from South Lebanon, Israel became a member of the Western European and Others Group at the United Nations. Prior to this Israel was the only nation at the UN which was not a member of any group (the Arab states would not allow it to join the Asia group), which meant it could not be a member of the Security Council or appoint anyone to the International Court and other key UN roles. Since December 2013 it has been a permanent member of the group.

In July 2000 Aryeh Deri was sentenced to three years in prison for bribe taking. Deri is regarded as the mastermind behind the rise of Shas and was a government minister at the age of 24. Political manipulation meant the investigation lasted for years. Deri subsequently sued a Police Officer who alleged that he was linked to the traffic-accident death of his mother-in-law (a key witness), who was run over in New York by a driver who had once been in the employ of an associate of Deri.

== Second Intifada ==
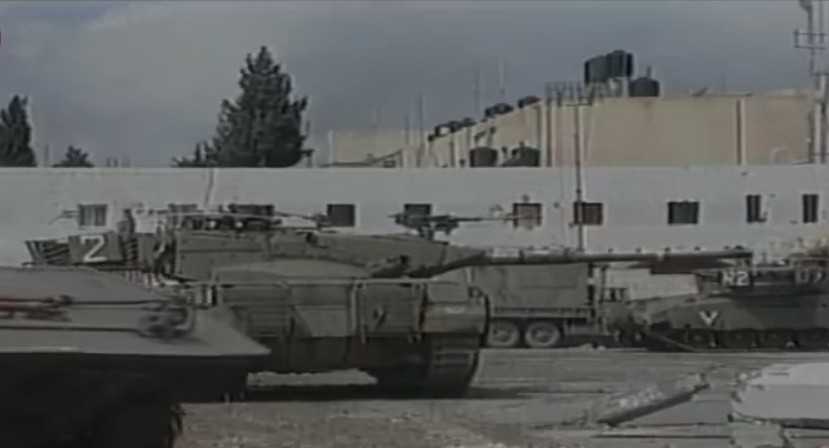
Israeli tanks and APCs at the Mukataa in Ramallah during the Second Intifada, 2002

On 28 September 2000 Israeli opposition leader Ariel Sharon visited the Al-Aqsa compound, or Temple Mount, the following day the Palestinians launched the al-Aqsa Intifada. David Samuels and Khaled Abu Toameh have stated that the uprising was planned much earlier. In October 2000, Palestinians destroyed Joseph's Tomb, a Jewish shrine in Nablus.

The Arrow missile, a missile designed to destroy ballistic missiles, including Scud missiles, was first deployed by Israel. In 2001, with the Peace Process increasingly in disarray, Ehud Barak called a special election for Prime Minister. Barak hoped a victory would give him renewed authority in negotiations with the Palestinians. Instead opposition leader Ariel Sharon was elected PM. After this election, the system of directly electing the Premier was abandoned.

The failure of the peace process, increased Palestinian terror and occasional attacks by Hezbollah from Lebanon, led much of the Israeli public and political leadership to lose confidence in the Palestinian Authority as a peace partner. Most felt that many Palestinians viewed the peace treaty with Israel as a temporary measure only. Many Israelis were thus anxious to disengage from the Palestinians. In response to a wave of suicide bomb attacks, culminating in the Passover massacre (see List of Israeli civilian casualties in the Second Intifada), Israel launched Operation Defensive Shield in March 2002, and Sharon began the construction of a barrier around the West Bank. Around the same time, the Israeli town of Sderot and other Israeli communities near Gaza became subject to constant shelling and mortar bomb attacks from Gaza.

Thousands of Jews from Latin America began arriving in Israel due to economic crises in their countries of origin. In January 2003 separate elections were held for the Knesset. Likud won the most seats (27). An anti-religion party, Shinui, led by media pundit Tommy Lapid, won 15 seats on a secularist platform, making it the third largest party (ahead of orthodox Shas). Internal fighting led to Shinui's demise at the next election. In 2004 the Black Hebrews were granted permanent residency in Israel. The group had begun migrating to Israel 25 years earlier from the United States, but had not been recognized as Jews by the state and hence not granted citizenship under Israel's Law of Return. They had settled in Israel without official status. From 2004 onwards, they received citizen's rights.

The Sharon government embarked on an extensive program of construction of desalinization plants that freed Israel of the fear of drought. Some of the Israeli desalinization plants are the largest of their kind in the world.

In May 2004 Israel launched Operation Rainbow in southern Gaza to create a safer environment for the IDF soldiers along the Philadelphi Route. On 30 September 2004, Israel carried out Operation Days of Penitence in northern Gaza to destroy the launching sites of Palestinian rockets which were used to attack Israeli towns. In 2005, all Jewish settlers were evacuated from Gaza (some forcibly) and their homes demolished. Disengagement from the Gaza Strip was completed on 12 September 2005. Military disengagement from the northern West Bank was completed ten days later.

In 2005 Sharon left the Likud and formed a new party called Kadima, which accepted that the peace process would lead to creation of a Palestinian state. He was joined by many leading figures from both Likud and Labour.

Hamas won the 2006 Palestinian legislative election, the first and only genuinely free Palestinian elections. Hamas' leaders rejected all agreements signed with Israel, refused to recognize Israel's right to exist, refused to abandon terror, and occasionally claimed the Holocaust was a Jewish conspiracy. The withdrawal and Hamas victory left the status of Gaza unclear, as Israel asserted it was no longer an occupying power but continued to control air and sea access to Gaza although it did not exercise sovereignty on the ground. Egypt insisted that it was still occupied and refused to open border crossings with Gaza, although it was free to do so.

In April 2006 Ariel Sharon was incapacitated by a severe hemorrhagic stroke and Ehud Olmert became Prime Minister.

== Late 2000s and 2010s ==
=== Late 2000s ===
In 2005, Mahmoud Ahmadinejad was elected president of Iran and the Iran–Israel proxy conflict intensified. Ehud Olmert was then elected prime minister after his party, Kadima, won the most seats (29) in the 2006 Israeli legislative election.

On 14 March 2006 Israel carried out an operation in the Palestinian Authority prison of Jericho to capture Ahmad Sa'adat and several Palestinian Arab prisoners located there who assassinated Israeli politician Rehavam Ze'evi in 2001. The operation was conducted as a result of the expressed intentions of the newly elected Hamas government to release these prisoners. On 25 June 2006, a Hamas force crossed the border from Gaza and attacked a tank, capturing Israeli soldier Gilad Shalit, sparking clashes in Gaza.

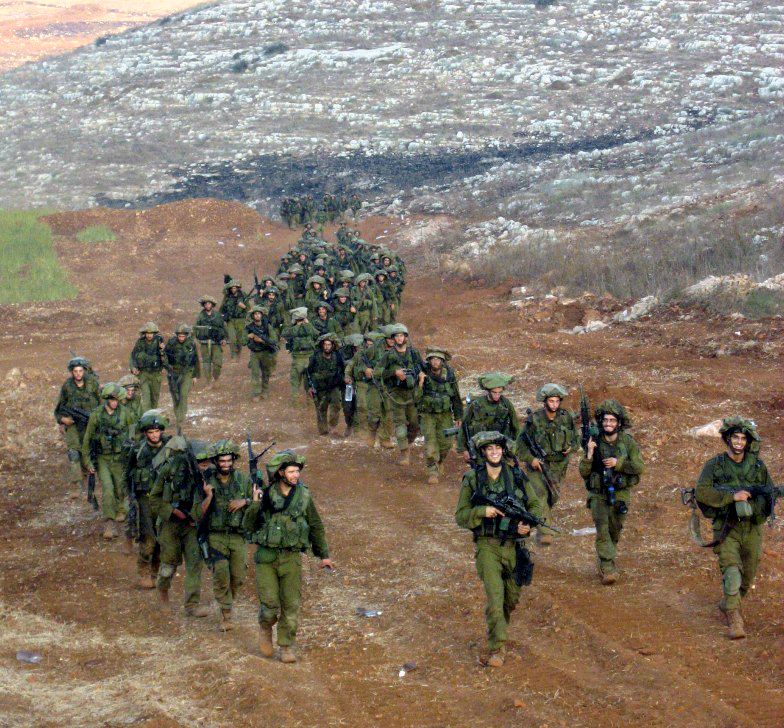
Nahal Brigade soldiers returning after the 2006 Lebanon War

On 12 July Hezbollah attacked Israel from Lebanon, shelled Israeli towns and attacked a border patrol, taking two dead or badly wounded Israeli soldiers. These incidents led Israel to initiate the Second Lebanon War, which lasted through August 2006. Israeli forces entered some villages in Southern Lebanon, while the air force attacked targets all across the country. Israel only made limited ground gains until the launch of Operation Changing Direction 11, which lasted for three days with disputed results. Shortly before a UN ceasefire came into effect, Israeli troops captured Wadi Saluki. The war concluded with Hezbollah evacuating its forces from Southern Lebanon, while the IDF remained until its positions could be handed over to the Lebanese Armed Forces and UNIFIL.

In 2007 education was made compulsory until the age of 18 for all citizens (it had been 16). Refugees from the genocide in Darfur, mostly Muslim, arrived in Israel illegally, with some given asylum. Illegal immigrants arrived mainly from Africa in addition to foreign workers overstaying their visas. The numbers of such migrants are not known, and estimates vary between 30,000 and over 100,000.

An American billionaire casino owner, Sheldon Adelson, set up a free newspaper Israel Hayom with the express intention of reducing the influence of the dominant (centre-left) newspaper Yediot Ahronot and accelerating a rightward shift in Israeli politics by supporting Netanyahu.

In June 2007 Hamas took control of the Gaza Strip in the course of the Battle of Gaza, seizing government institutions and replacing Fatah and other government officials with its own. Following the takeover, Egypt and Israel imposed a partial blockade, on the grounds that Fatah had fled and was no longer providing security on the Palestinian side, and to prevent arms smuggling by terrorist groups. On 6 September 2007, the Israeli Air Force destroyed a nuclear reactor in Syria. On 28 February 2008, Israel launched a military campaign in Gaza in response to the constant firing of Qassam rockets by Hamas militants. On 16 July 2008, Hezbollah swapped the bodies of Israeli soldiers Ehud Goldwasser and Eldad Regev, kidnapped in 2006, in exchange for the Lebanese terrorist Samir Kuntar, four Hezbollah prisoners, and the bodies of 199 Palestinian Arab and Lebanese fighters.

Olmert came under investigation for corruption and this led him to announce on 30 July 2008, that he would be stepping down as prime minister following election of a new leader of the Kadima party in September 2008. Tzipi Livni won the election, but was unable to form a coalition and Olmert remained in office until the general election. Israel carried out Operation Cast Lead in the Gaza Strip from 27 December 2008 to 18 January 2009 in response to rocket attacks from Hamas militants.

In the 2009 legislative election, Likud won 27 seats and Kadima 28; however, the right-wing camp won a majority of seats, and President Shimon Peres called on Netanyahu to form the government. Russian immigrant-dominated Yisrael Beiteinu came third with 15 seats, and Labour was reduced to fourth place with 13 seats. In 2009, Israeli billionaire Yitzhak Tshuva announced the discovery of huge natural gas reserves off the coast of Israel.

=== Early 2010s ===
On 31 May 2010 an international incident broke out in the Mediterranean Sea when foreign activists trying to break the maritime blockade over Gaza, clashed with Israeli troops. During the struggle, nine Turkish activists were killed. In late September 2010 took place direct negotiations between Israel and the Palestinians without success. As a defensive countermeasure to the rocket threat against Israel's civilian population, at the end of March 2011 Israel began to operate the advanced mobile air defence system "Iron Dome" in the southern region of Israel and along the border with the Gaza Strip.

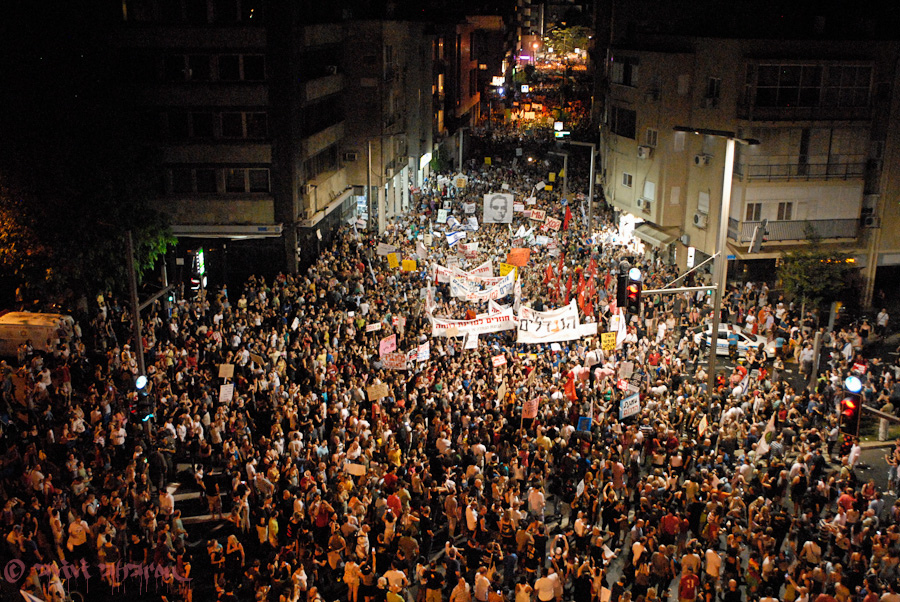
Protest in Tel Aviv on 6 August 2011

On 14 July 2011 the largest social protest in the history of Israel began in which hundreds of thousands of protesters from a variety of socio-economic and religious backgrounds in Israel protested against the continuing rise in the cost of living (particularly housing) and the deterioration of public services in the country (such as health and education). The peak of the demonstrations took place on 3 September 2011, in which about 400,000 people demonstrated across the country.

In October 2011 a deal was reached between Israel and Hamas, by which the kidnapped Israeli soldier Gilad Shalit was released in exchange for 1,027 Palestinians and Arab-Israeli prisoners. In March 2012, Secretary-general of the Popular Resistance Committees, Zuhir al-Qaisi, a senior PRC member and two additional Palestinian militants were assassinated during a targeted killing carried out by Israeli forces in Gaza. The Palestinian armed factions in the Gaza Strip, led by the Islamic Jihad and the Popular Resistance Committees, fired a massive amount of rockets towards southern Israel in retaliation, sparking five days of clashes along the Gaza border.

In May 2012 prime minister Benjamin Netanyahu reached an agreement with the Head of Opposition Shaul Mofaz for Kadima to join the government, thus cancelling the early election supposed to be held in September. However, in July, the Kadima party left Netanyahu's government due to a dispute concerning military conscription for ultra-Orthodox Jews in Israel.

In June 2012 Israel transferred the bodies of 91 Palestinian suicide bombers and other militants as part of what Mark Regev, spokesman for Netanyahu, described as a "humanitarian gesture" to PA chairman Mahmoud Abbas to help revive the peace talks, and reinstate direct negotiations between Israel and the Palestinians. On 21 October 2012, United States and Israel began their biggest joint air and missile defence exercise, known as Austere Challenge 12, involving some 3500 US troops in the region along with 1,000 IDF personnel, expected to last three weeks. Germany and Britain also participated. In response to over a hundred rocket attacks on southern Israeli cities, Israel began an operation in Gaza on 14 November 2012, with the targeted killing of Ahmed Jabari, chief of Hamas military wing, and airstrikes against twenty underground sites housing long-range missile launchers capable of striking Tel Aviv. In January 2013, construction of the barrier on the Israeli-Egyptian border was completed in its main section.

Benjamin Netanyahu was elected prime minister again after the Likud Yisrael Beiteinu alliance won the most seats (31) in the 2013 legislative election and formed a coalition government with secular centrist Yesh Atid party (19), rightist The Jewish Home (12) and Livni's Hatnuah (6), excluding Haredi parties. Labour came in third with 15 seats. In July 2013, as a "good will gesture" to restart peace talks with the Palestinian Authority, Israel agreed to release 104 Palestinian prisoners, most of whom had been in jail since before the 1993 Oslo Accords, including militants who had killed Israeli civilians. In April 2014, Israel suspended peace talks after Hamas and Fatah agreed to form a unity government.

=== 2014 Gaza War ===
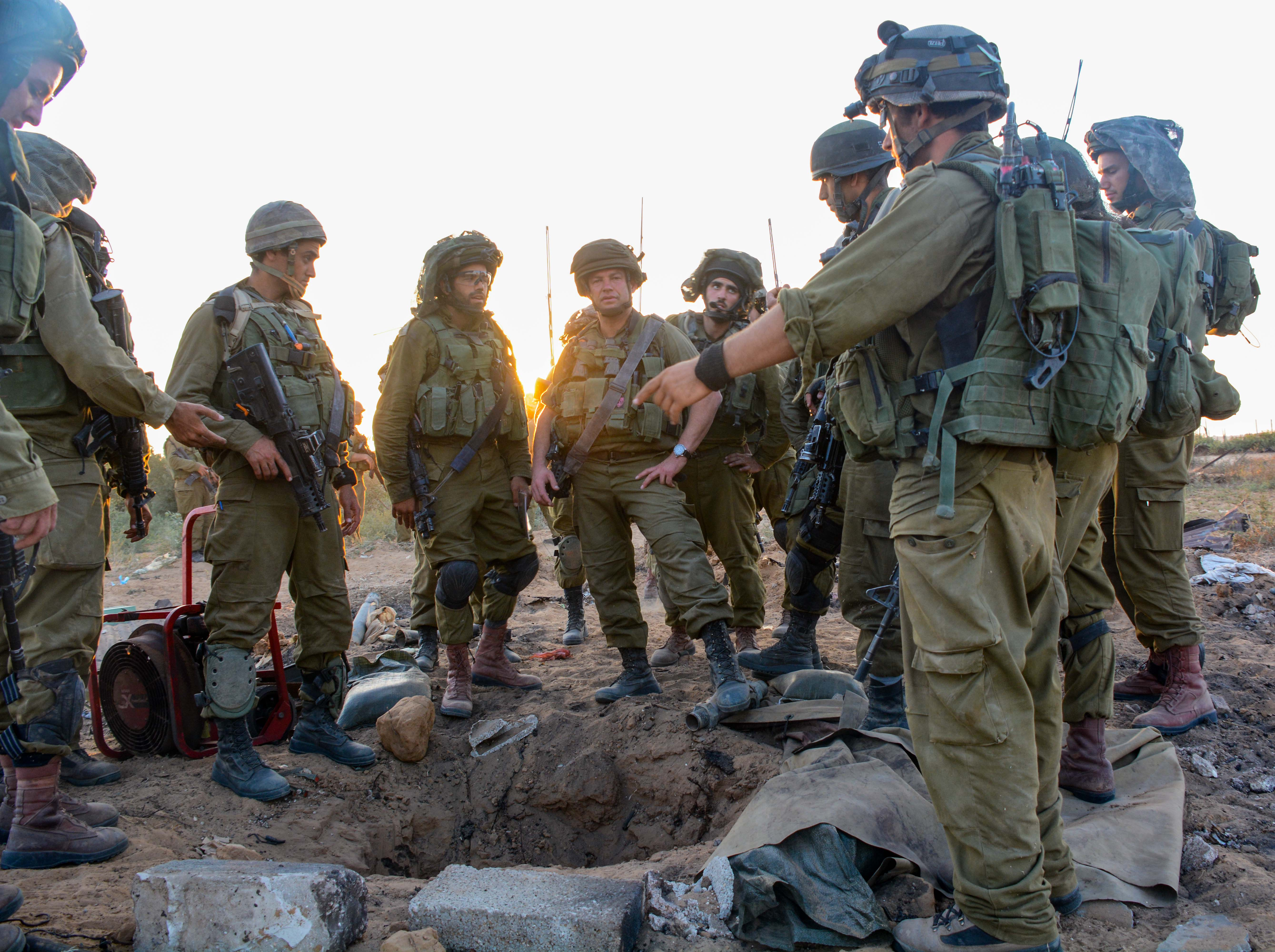
Israeli paratroopers operating against Hamas tunnels during the 2014 Gaza War

Following an escalation of rocket attacks by Hamas, Israel started an operation in the Gaza Strip on 8 July 2014, which included a ground incursion aimed at destroying the cross-border tunnels. Differences over the budget and a "Jewish state" bill triggered early elections in December 2014. After the 2015 Israeli elections, Netanyahu renewed his mandate as prime minister when Likud obtained 30 seats and formed a right-wing coalition government with Kulanu (10), The Jewish Home (8), and Orthodox parties Shas (7) and United Torah Judaism (6), the bare minimum of seats required to form a coalition. The Zionist Union alliance came second with 24 seats. A wave of lone-wolf attacks by Palestinians took place in 2015 and 2016, particularly stabbings.

=== Late 2010s ===
On 6 December 2017 president Donald Trump formally announced United States recognition of Jerusalem as the capital of Israel, which was followed by the United States recognition of the Golan Heights as part of Israel on 25 March 2019. In March 2018, Palestinians in Gaza initiated "the Great March of Return," a series of weekly protests along the Gaza–Israel border.

== 2020s–present ==
The COVID-19 pandemic began in Israel with the first case detected in February 2020 and the first death being that of a Holocaust survivor in March 2020. Israel Shield was the government's program to combat against the virus. Nationwide lockdowns and mask mandates were present throughout the country for much of 2020 into 2021, with the vaccination campaign beginning in December 2020 along with green passes.

In late 2020, Israel normalised relations with four Arab League countries: the United Arab Emirates and Bahrain in September (known as the Abraham Accords), Sudan in October, and Morocco in December. In May 2021, after tensions escalated in Jerusalem, Israel and Hamas traded blows in Gaza for eleven days.

The 2019–2022 political crisis featured political instability in Israel leading to five elections to the Knesset over four years. The April 2019 and September 2019 elections saw no party able to form a coalition leading to the March 2020 election. This election again looked to result in deadlock, but due to the worsening COVID-19 pandemic, Netanyahu, and Blue and White leader, Benny Gantz, were able to establish a unity government with a planned rotating prime ministership where Netanyahu would serve first and later be replaced by Gantz. The coalition failed by December due to a dispute over the budget and new elections were called for March 2021.

Following the March 2021 election, Naftali Bennett signed a coalition agreement with Yair Lapid and different parties opposed to Netanyahu on the right, center and left whereby Bennett would serve as prime minister until September 2023 and then Lapid would assume the role until November 2025. An Israeli Arab party, Ra'am, was included in the government coalition for the first time in decades. In June 2022, following several legislative defeats for the governing coalition, Bennett announced the introduction of a bill to dissolve the Knesset and call for new elections to be held in November. Yair Lapid became the new interim prime minister. After the 2022 elections, Netanyahu was able to return as prime minister under a coalition that included Likud, Shas, United Torah Judaism, Religious Zionist Party, Otzma Yehudit and Noam, in what was described as the most right-wing government in the country's history. A number of the right-wing coalitions have been controversial, both domestically and internationally, with its attempts at judicial reform leading to the 2023 Israeli judicial reform protests. Military actions such as the July 2023 Jenin incursion, alongside a rise in Palestinian political violence, have meanwhile resulted in an uptick in violence in the Israel–Palestine conflict, producing a death toll in 2023 that is the highest in the conflict since 2005.

=== Gaza war ===
The Gaza war between Israel and Palestinian militant groups led by Hamas (Note: The list of groups included Hamas, Islamic Jihad, Popular Front for the Liberation of Palestine, Democratic Front for the Liberation of Palestine and the Lions' Den.) began on 7 October 2023, with a coordinated surprise offensive on Israel. The attack began with a rocket barrage of at least 3,000 rockets launched from the Hamas-controlled Gaza Strip against Israel. In parallel, thousands of Palestinian militants breached the Gaza–Israel barrier, attacking military bases and massacring civilians in neighboring Israeli communities. Around 1,200 people were killed, including 378 at a music festival. Unarmed civilian hostages and captured Israeli soldiers were taken to the Gaza Strip, including women and children. Israel formally declared war on Hamas and its allies a day later, launching a bombing campaign and invading Gaza. The day after Hamas attacked, Hezbollah initiated clashes along Lebanon's border with Israel, which eventually resulted in an Israeli invasion of southern Lebanon and the fall of Assad in Syria. Israel also fought two wars with Iran in 2025 and 2026, while engaging the Houthis in Yemen and other Iranian-backed groups across the Middle East.
