= Indexation of contracts =

Adjustment of prices for inflation

In statistics relating to national economies, the indexation of contracts also called "index linking" and "contract escalation" is a procedure when a contract includes a periodic adjustment to the prices paid for the contract provisions based on the level of a nominated price index. The purpose of indexation is to readjust contracts to account for inflation. In the United States, the consumer price index (CPI), producer price index (PPI) and Employment Cost Index (ECI) are the most frequently used indexes.

== See also ==
- Indexation
- Purchasing power
- Bureau of Labor Statistics
