= Refaat Alareer =

Palestinian writer and professor (1979–2023)

- رفعت العرعير
- Born: 23 September 1979; Shuja'iyya, Gaza, Palestine
- Died: 6 December 2023 (aged 44); Shuja'iyya, Gaza, Palestine
- Cause of death: Israeli airstrike
- Occupation: Professor
- Known for: Activism
- Spouse: Nusayba
- Children: 6

Academic background
- Education: Islamic University of Gaza (BA); University College London (MA); Universiti Putra Malaysia (PhD)

Academic work
- Discipline: English literature
- Institutions: Islamic University in Gaza
- Notable works: Gaza Writes Back (2014); Gaza Unsilenced (2015); If I Must Die: Poetry and Prose (2024)

Refaat Alareer (Arabic: رفعت العرعير, romanized: Rifaʿat al-ʿAriʿīr; 23 September 1979 – 6 December 2023) was a Palestinian writer, poet, professor, and activist from the Gaza Strip.

Alareer was born in Gaza City in 1979 during the Israeli occupation of the Gaza Strip, which he said had negatively influenced every move and decision he made. Alareer earned a BA in English in 2001 from the Islamic University of Gaza and an MA from University College London in 2007. He earned a PhD in English Literature at the Universiti Putra Malaysia in 2017 with a dissertation on John Donne.

He taught literature and creative writing at the Islamic University of Gaza and co-founded the organization We Are Not Numbers, which matched experienced authors with young writers in Gaza, and promoted the power of storytelling as a means of Palestinian resistance against the Israeli occupation.

On 6 December 2023, Alareer was killed by an Israeli airstrike in northern Gaza, along with his brother, sister, and four of his nephews, during the Israeli invasion of the Gaza Strip. The Euro-Med Monitor released a statement saying that Alareer was deliberately targeted, "surgically bombed out of the entire building", and came after weeks of "death threats that Refaat received online and by phone from Israeli accounts." On 26 April 2024, his eldest daughter and his newborn grandchild were killed by an Israeli airstrike on their Gaza City home.

In December 2024, his final collection of writing, the posthumously published If I Must Die: Poetry and Prose, named after his most famous poem – If I Must Die – became a bestseller.

== Early life and education ==
Refaat Alareer was born 23 September 1979 in Shuja'iyya in Gaza City. Growing up in Gaza, he said, meant "every move I took and every decision I made were influenced (usually negatively) by the Israeli occupation."

Alareer earned a BA in English in 2001 from the Islamic University of Gaza and an MA from University College London in 2007. He earned a Ph.D. in English Literature at the Universiti Putra Malaysia in 2017 with a dissertation entitled "Unframing John Donne's Transgressive Poetry in Light of Bakhtin's Dialogic Theories."

== Career ==
Alareer edited two volumes in English. One was a collection of Palestinian short stories, Gaza Writes Back (2014), the other, which he co-edited with Laila El-Haddad, was Gaza Unsilenced (2015), an anthology of mainly non-fiction accounts of, and reactions to, Israel's 2014 attack against Gaza. In an interview, he stated: "Gaza Writes Back was an attempt to provide a testimony for future generations."

In 2007, Alareer became a professor at Islamic University in Gaza, where he taught world literature and creative writing. This included engaging with Israeli poetry and depictions of Jews in English literature, with a focus on Shakespeare. He identified his ultimate teaching goal as highlighting parallel experiences of Palestinians and Jews. At the same time, he sought to show that Israel also used literature "as a tool of colonialism and oppression."

He co-founded the organization We Are Not Numbers, a mentorship program that matches writers in Gaza with authors abroad. The organization promotes the power of storytelling as a means of Palestinian resistance.

During the 2021 Israel–Palestine crisis, he wrote an opinion piece in the New York Times about the war occurring in the Gaza Strip, ending it with a conversation with his 8-year-old daughter, Linah:

On Tuesday, Linah asked her question again after my wife and I didn't answer it the first time: Can they destroy our building if the power is out? I wanted to say: “Yes, little Linah, Israel can still destroy the beautiful al-Jawharah building, or any of our buildings, even in the darkness. Each of our homes is full of tales and stories that must be told. Our homes annoy the Israeli war machine, mock it, haunt it, even in the darkness. It can’t abide their existence. And, with American tax dollars and international immunity, Israel presumably will go on destroying our buildings until there is nothing left.” But I can't tell Linah any of this. So I lie: “No, sweetie. They can’t see us in the dark.”

During the Gaza war, Alareer made media appearances on the BBC, Democracy Now!, and ABC News. Additionally, he served as a key contact for El País, offering updates about the situation in Gaza. In the immediate aftermath of the October 7 attacks, he described the attack as "legitimate and moral" and said it was "exactly like the Warsaw Ghetto Uprising." He also rejected allegations of Hamas engaging in sexual violence during the 7 October attack as lies used to "justify the Gaza genocide."

Patrick Kingsley, Jerusalem bureau chief of The New York Times, wrote that Alareer's critical remarks about Israel drew accusations in Israel of being "virulently anti-Israeli and antisemitic". In response to the claim, since debunked, that Hamas had killed a baby by placing it in an oven, Alareer jokingly responded "with or without baking powder" on Twitter, which subsequently provoked backlash. This backlash included an online harassment campaign from Bari Weiss which led Alareer to tweet, "If I get killed by Israeli bombs or my family is harmed, I blame Bari Weiss and her likes." The New York Times reported that many of Alareer's views reflected his anger at Israel, which was worsened by the killing of his brother in an Israeli airstrike during the 2014 war, and the fact that the Israeli blockade on Gaza had at times prevented him from leaving the Gaza Strip to study and teach abroad.

== Personal life ==
Alareer and his wife had six children. His brother, Mohammed, as well as his wife Nusayba's grandfather, brother, sister, and three nieces were killed during the 2014 Gaza War by an Israeli bombing campaign. In total, Israel killed more than 30 relatives of Alareer and his wife. During the 2021 Israel–Palestine crisis, Alareer wrote an op-ed in The New York Times describing the effects on his children. He was a Gaza Zoo volunteer, which he continued during the Gaza war.

On 26 April 2024, five months after Alareer's death, his eldest daughter Shaimaa, her husband Mohammed Siyam, and their newborn baby were killed by an Israeli airstrike on their home in Gaza City. Shaimaa had written to her father Refaat in a message after she delivered her baby a few months after Refaat's death:

"I have a beautiful news for you, I wish I could convey it to you while you are in front of me, I present to you your first grandchild. Do you know, my father, that you have become a grandfather? This is your grandson Abd al-Rahman whom I have long imagined you carrying, but I never imagined that I would lose you early even before you see him."

== Death ==
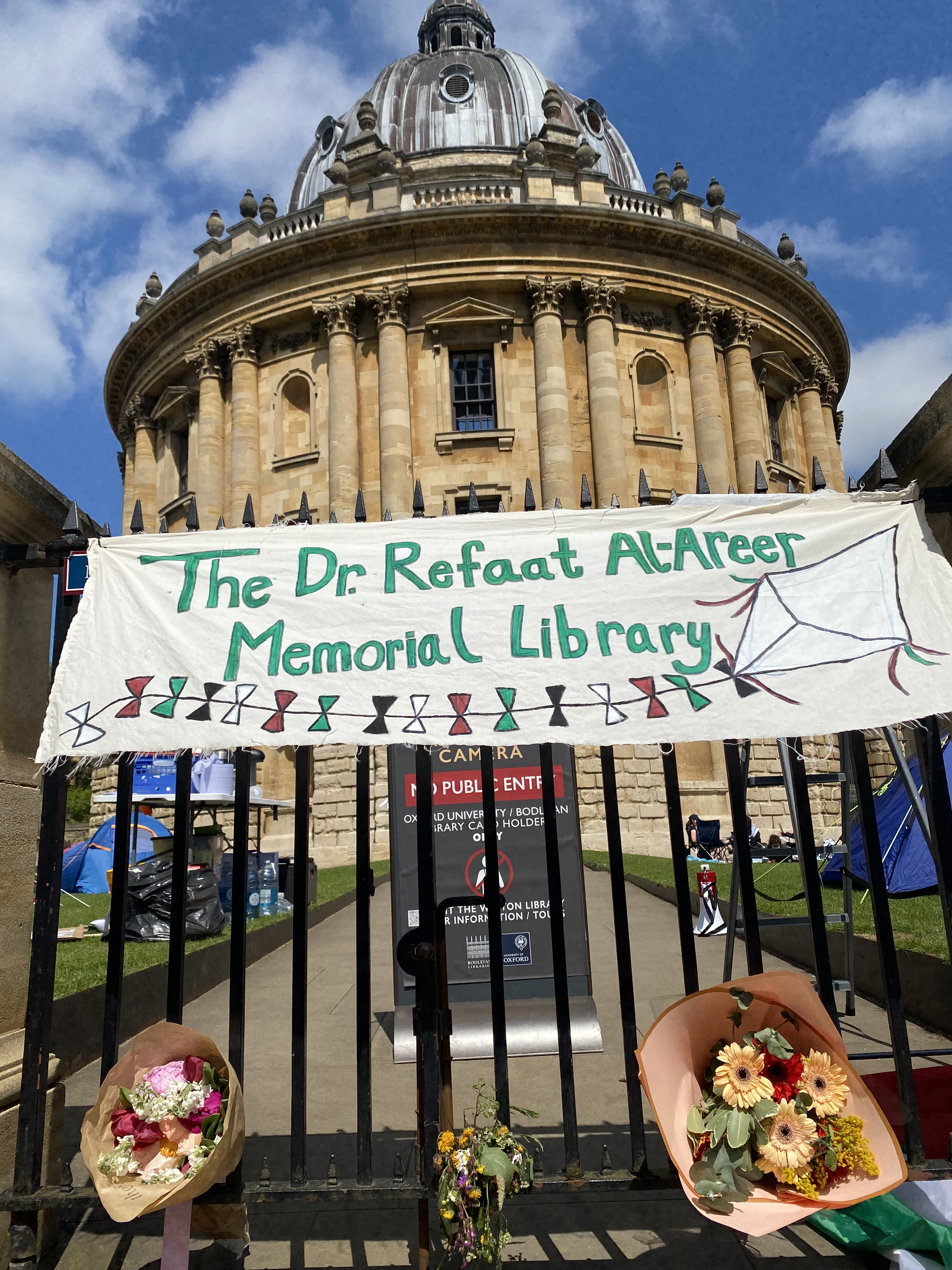
Alareer mentioned on a banner on the gates of the Radcliffe Camera during the 2024 University of Oxford pro-Palestinian campus occupations

Alareer was killed by an Israeli airstrike at approximately 18:00 on 6 December 2023 in northern Gaza. He had refused to leave northern Gaza at the start of the Gaza war. His brother Salah with son Mohammed, and his sister Asmaa with three of her children (Alaa, Yahia, and Mohammed) were also among those killed in the same airstrike.

Euro-Med Monitor released a statement saying that it appeared that Alareer was deliberately targeted, saying that the apartment he was in with his family was "surgically bombed out of the entire building where it's located, according to corroborated eyewitness and family accounts. This came after weeks of death threats that Alareer received online and by phone from Israeli accounts." The Euro-Med Monitor report stated that prior to his death, Alareer had been sheltering in a UNRWA school in Gaza with his wife and children when he received a threat via phone call stating that they knew the school where he was located. This prompted Alareer to evacuate the school and move to his sister's apartment.

In his last interview before being killed, with the sound of Israeli bombs exploding in the background, Alareer said that Gazans felt helpless and that, while he had no weapons, he would defend himself if the Israeli army were to come to his house using his Expo marker.

=== "If I must die" ===
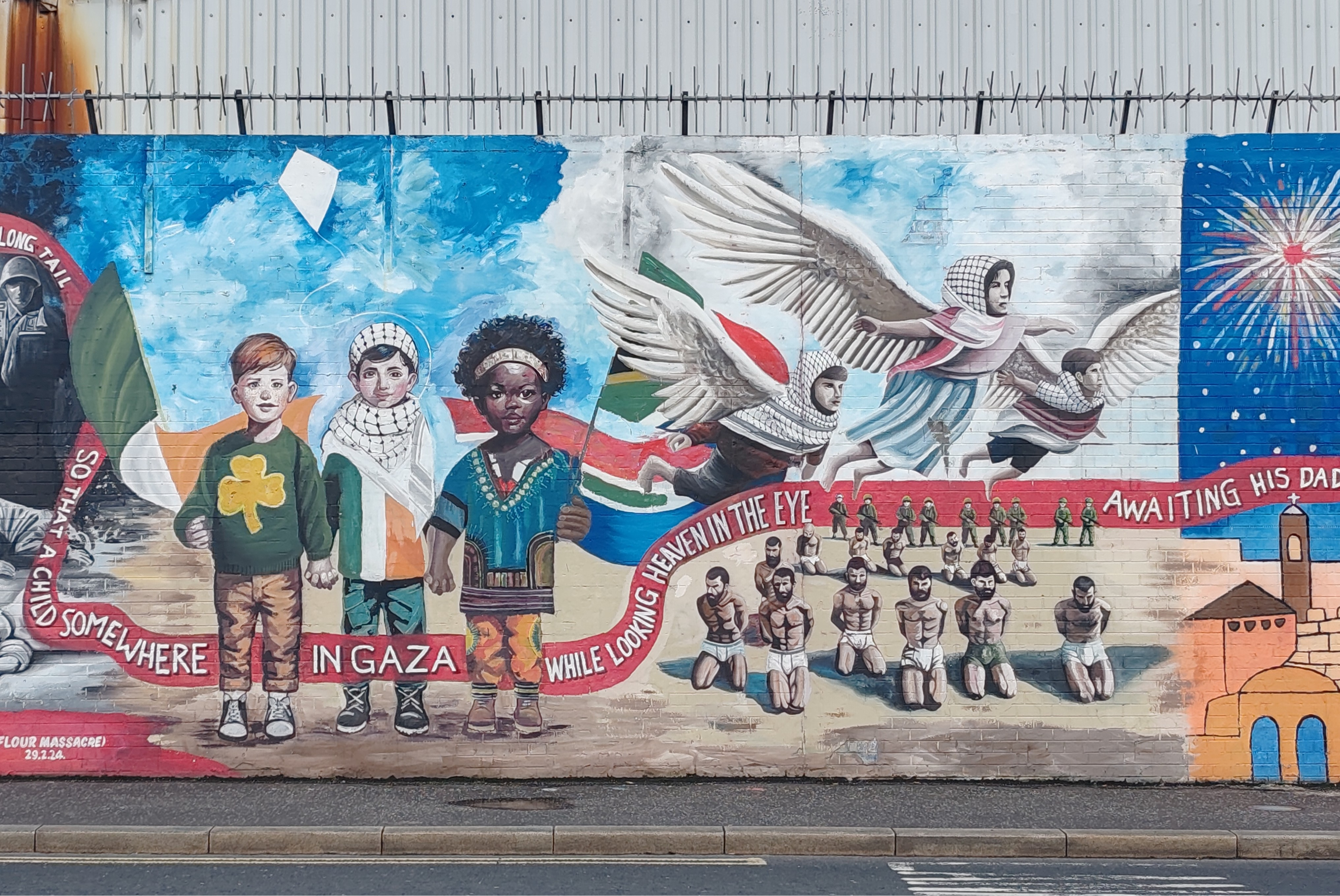
Lines from Alareer's poem If I Must Die featured in a mural in Belfast in 2026.

Alareer's poem "If I Must Die" was widely circulated after his killing and was translated into more than 250 languages.

His close friend Asem Alnabih, who had spent many moments with him and was with him just an hour before his death, mourned him. Asem recalls that in his final hours, Refaat was moving between shelter centers. He visited Yarmouk Stadium and took some photographs.

=== Tributes ===
The founder of the Euro-Mediterranean Human Rights Monitor, Ramy Abdu, stated that Israeli soldiers "targeted, went after and killed the voice of Gaza, one of its best academics, a human, my dear and precious friend."

Poet Mosab Abu Toha wrote: "My heart is broken, my friend and colleague Refaat Alareer was killed with his family." Najwan Darwish told The Guardian that Alareer had been "an influential voice," adding: "We didn't just lose Alareer, but we lost his poetry; it's all underneath the rubble, all the future poetry he would have written. And all these artists who have been killed … what's happened to their art?"

Palestinian-American professor Sami Al-Arian noted: "He was an amazing poet, an articulate voice for Gazans, and a true bridge to people outside Palestine. His loss will be missed by many inside Palestine and around the world".

== Works ==
=== Collections ===
- Alareer, Refaat (2024). Aljamal, Yousef M. (ed.). If I Must Die: Poetry and Prose. New York: OR Books. ISBN 978-1-68219-621-2. (with a foreword by Susan Abulhawa)

=== Edited collections ===
- Alareer, Refaat, ed. (2014). Gaza Writes Back: Short Stories from Young Writers in Gaza, Palestine. Charlottesville, VA: Just World Books. ISBN 978-1-935982-35-7.
  - Alareer, Refaat, ed. (2015). Gaza writes back. Racconti di giovani autori e autrici da Gaza, Palestina (in Italian). Translated by Lorusso, L. Lorusso Editore. ISBN 978-88-941069-0-9.
- Alareer, Refaat; El-Haddad, Laila, eds. (2015). Gaza Unsilenced. Charlottesville, VA: Just World Books. ISBN 978-1-935982-55-5.

=== Essays ===
- Alareer, Refaat (13 May 2021). "My Child Asks, 'Can Israel Destroy Our Building if the Power Is Out?'". The New York Times. Archived from the original on 7 December 2023.
- Alareer, Refaat (2022). "Gaza Asks: When Shall This Pass?". In Abusalim, Jehad; Bing, Jennifer; Merryman-Lotze, Michael (eds.). Light in Gaza: Writings Born of Fire. Chicago, Illinois: AFSC and Haymarket Books. pp. 15–28. ISBN 978-1-64259-725-7.
- Alareer, Refaat (20 June 2023). "They even keep our corpses: Dying in Israeli prisons". Scalawag Magazine. "And in a display of extreme cruelty, the officer's callous words echoed through the air, reverberating with the weight of a thousand fatherless nights. With a smirk, he brazenly boasted to the grief-stricken son, "I killed your father." The room fell into an abyss of silence. Time stood still, shattered by the impact of those haunting syllables. 'It was like they killed my father twice.'"

=== PhD thesis ===
- Alareer, Refaat R. (August 2017). Unframing John Donne's Transgressive Poetry in Light of Bakhtin's Dialogic Theories (PDF) (Ph.D. thesis). Serdang, Selangor: Universiti Putra Malaysia. OCLC 1121182447.
