= Tomorrow's Pioneers =

Palestinian television show

- Arabic: رواد الغد
- Created by: Hazim Al-Sha'arawi
- Directed by: Samir Abu Muhssen
- Starring: Hazim Al-Sha'arawi; Saraa Barhoum; Mohammed Alareer; Maryam
- Country of origin: Palestine
- Original language: Arabic

Production
- Editor: Hazim Al-Sha'arawi

Original release
- Network: Al-Aqsa TV
- Release: 13 April 2007 – October 2009

Tomorrow's Pioneers (Note: Arabic: رواد الغد, romanized: Ruwād al-Ghad, also known as The Pioneers of Tomorrow) is a Palestinian children's television show that was broadcast by the Hamas-run television station Al-Aqsa TV from 13 April 2007 to October 2009, and broadcast online until 22 July 2022. The show was created and edited by Hazim Al-Sha'arawi, directed by Samir Abu Muhssen, and hosted by Saraa Barhoum, later by a presenter named Maryam, alongside a succession of large costumed characters. Presented in a children's educational format similar to shows like Sesame Street and Barney & Friends, Tomorrow's Pioneers taught Islamic morals and values, periodically quoting the Quran. The characters performed skits and discussed life in Palestine in a talk show fashion with call-ins from young children.

According to a 2010 statement from the Anti-Defamation League, the show covered topics such as antisemitism, Anti-Western sentiment, and jihad. Some defenders of the show have regarded it as a reflection of life in the occupied territory. Some Palestinians in Gaza have objected to Hamas's control of children's media.

In 2007, Tomorrow's Pioneers gained attention from Diane Disney Miller, who later requested that the first co-host, Farfour, be written out of the show due to his strong resemblance to Mickey Mouse. Farfour was killed in what the show referred to as a martyrdom. He was replaced by a giant bumblebee named Nahoul, who was in turn succeeded by Assoud the rabbit, Nassur the bear, and Karkour the chicken. Nahoul came back in late 2013, but in the following year, the actor who played him and Karkour, Mohammed Alareer, was killed in an Israeli airstrike. Following Farfour's recognition, Tomorrow's Pioneers was pulled from Al-Aqsa TV and placed under review at the request of then-Palestinian Information Minister Mustafa Barghouti's ministry. In 2008, the United States House Committee on Foreign Affairs passed House Resolution 1069, which called on the Bush administration to designate Al-Aqsa TV as a Specially Designated Global Terrorist entity.

The English translation of the show by American non-profit organization MEMRI faced criticism in 2007 from CNN Arabic and Brian Whitaker of The Guardian for containing errors, undue emphasis, and potential bias. MEMRI president Yigal Carmon was later invited onto political commentator Glenn Beck's program and defended the accuracy of MEMRI's translation.

== Background ==
The Palestinian nationalist organization Hamas has used media to spread information in support of the organization and its ideologies via newspapers, leaflets, websites, television, radio, affiliated mosques, vocal groups and trading cards. According to author Thomas David Parker, Hamas focuses especially on children, with the organization referring to the practice as "training the Muslim generation" or "Islamization from below". The organization hosts youth summer camps that focus on religion, politics, developing computer skills, and, occasionally, using firearms.

The use of media to spread messages or ideologies is not exclusive to Hamas; in a 2002 letter to Taliban founder Mullah Omar, Osama bin Laden referred to media as "one of the strongest methods" of spreading information in the 21st century. Al-Qaeda strategist Abu Bakr Naji, when referring to the concept of soft power popularized by Joseph Nye, categorized the resources of global powers as either "almighty military power[s]" or "deceptive media halo[s]". Hamas and Lebanese political party Hezbollah categorize the audiences of their media into various groups, such as the "international public", the Arab world, and the Palestinian or Lebanese peoples.

Results of the 2006 Palestinian legislative election by governorate

On 9 January 2006, before Hamas won the Palestinian legislative election, Fathi Hamad established a channel, Al-Aqsa TV, due to Hamas's rising influence in the Gaza Strip. The channel broadcast news, sports, Quran readings, Islamic debates, and children's shows such as Tomorrow's Pioneers, which spread the organization's ideologies. Furthermore, the version of Islam in Hamas's media purportedly includes elements of Palestinian nationalism.

== Production and format ==
Tomorrow's Pioneers was directed by Samir Abu Muhssen and was also created and edited by Al-Aqsa TV deputy director Hazim Al-Sha'arawi, who moderated an earlier Hamas-broadcast radio program called Afnan and Aghsan. (Note: Arabic: أفنان وأغصان, lit. 'Branches and Twigs') The viewership of Tomorrow's Pioneers has not been estimated or officially announced, but during its run, Al-Sha'arawi, who played the character Uncle Hazim, (Note: Also rendered as Uncle Hazem) attracted up to 10,000 children during Hamas-sponsored festivals.

The show revolves around a host, originally Saraa Barhoum, (Note: Arabic: سرّاء برهوم) and a costumed character performing comedic or educational skits and discussing life in Palestine, similar to children's shows like Sesame Street and Barney & Friends. Tomorrow's Pioneers included call-ins from children who were as young as nine years old and occasionally sang their own anashid, a form of a cappella. The target age of the show's audience, referred to as "soldiers", is debated; Al-Aqsa TV said it was between three and seven years old, but France 24 pinpointed the show's demographic as between seven and thirteen.

In an Al Jazeera interview, Al-Aqsa TV director Fathi Hamad said Tomorrow's Pioneers was intended to remind the audience, particularly those belonging to the Palestinian diaspora, about their cause and to "expose" the situation between Israel and Palestine. Before the show began airing, Al-Sha'arawi said in an interview with The New York Times that the show's message would not "[get] into the tanks, the guns, the killing and the blood", but show Palestinian rights "through the history". The show, alongside other Hamas media, periodically quoted the Quran and taught children Islamic traditions and customs, such as performing one's daily prayers, as well as healthy habits like the importance of drinking milk.

== Broadcast history ==
Tomorrow's Pioneers was first broadcast on 13 April 2007. Episodes were intended to be aired on Fridays at 4 pm Palestinian Standard Time, but due to political instability and the regional conflict between Hamas and Fatah, the show did not maintain consistent broadcasting. During the Battle of Gaza in June 2007, the Al-Aqsa TV station was taken over and shut down by Fatah gunmen. Hamas eventually gained control of Gaza, and Fatah forces withdrew.

On 10 May 2007, Mustafa Barghouti, the then-Palestinian Information Minister, criticized the character Farfour as a "mistaken approach" against Israeli occupation. His ministry requested the removal of Tomorrow's Pioneers from Al-Aqsa TV for review following Farfour's international attention due to the character's resemblance to Mickey Mouse. Barghouti expressed support of the show if Al-Aqsa TV did not place children in political scenarios. In response, Hamad said that the show did not violate any ethical standards, adding that the criticism was designed by Western and occupying powers to oppose Islam and the Palestinian cause. An Al-Aqsa TV representative responded to Barghouti's statements, saying that he "misunderstood the issue", and Hamad denied Barghouti's response, and said that Al-Aqsa TV would not stop broadcasting Tomorrow's Pioneers. Fatah began broadcasting a competing children's show, which also used the likeness of Disney characters, on the official Palestinian Authority TV network in September 2008. In October 2009, following complaints by members of the Palestinian Authority (PA), the PA pulled Tomorrow's Pioneers from Al-Aqsa TV, but the show aired on other Middle Eastern television stations, as well as on the Internet. Following a sporadic broadcasting schedule in the 2010s, the final episode of Tomorrow's Pioneers aired on 22 July 2022.

== Characters ==
=== Saraa Barhoum ===
Saraa Barhoum was around 10–11 years old when the show started. She had seven siblings, and her uncle, Fawzi Barhoum, was a Hamas spokesman. Saraa was chosen as the host of Tomorrow's Pioneers after she entered a singing competition. In an August 2007 interview, Saraa said she wanted to be a medical practitioner, and if not that, then a martyr. In late 2013, Saraa was replaced by a new host, Maryam. (Note: Arabic: مريم; also rendered as Mariam)

=== Farfour ===
Farfour purportedly mimicking an AK-47 being fired

Farfour (Note: Arabic: فرفور; also rendered as Farfur) was a mouse from Haifa whose design resembled Mickey Mouse. He had a high-pitched voice and co-hosted Tomorrow's Pioneers with Saraa. On the show, Farfour had expressed pro-Islamist views, stating that he and Saraa "are laying the foundation for a world led by Islamists" and that they "will return the Islamic community to its former greatness" by liberating Jerusalem and Iraq, among other locations. In an episode titled "Farfour and the AK-47", he simulated shooting an AK-47 and throwing stones. In his final appearance on 29 June 2007, Farfour was imprisoned and later beaten to death during an interrogation by an Israeli official, who was trying to buy Farfour's land. The story arc in which Farfour was killed was created by Al-Sha'arawi.

From an Islamic perspective, the decision to make Farfour a mouse was unconventional. According to Islamic law and Saudi cleric Muhammad al-Munajid, rodents and rodent characters such as Mickey Mouse generally have a negative image in Islam. In a hadith from Sahih al-Bukhari, the prophet Muhammad lists rats as one of the five harmful animals, alongside scorpions, kites, crows, and rabid dogs. Emmanuel Karagiannis, in the Routledge Handbook of Political Islam, mentions how Hamas ignored the reputation of Farfour's species due to his popularity among the show's young audience.

=== Nahoul and Karkour ===
Nahoul (Note: Arabic: نحول; also rendered as Nahul or Nahool) was a bumblebee with a high-pitched voice who co-hosted Tomorrow's Pioneers with Saraa after Farfour's death, which was referred to in the show as a "martyrdom". He introduced himself as Farfour's cousin, and promised to continue in the path of martyrdom. According to Karagiannis and Al-Sha'arawi, the choice to make Nahoul a bee was an intentional reference to the 16th chapter of the Quran, An-Nahl, which translates to "The Bee" in English. Following Nahoul's introduction, Muhssen told Al Jazeera that additional characters were planned for Tomorrow's Pioneers, but they were not intended to replace Nahoul.

PETA spokesman Martin Mersereau criticized a segment where Nahoul threw stones at lions and swung cats by their tails at the Gaza Zoo, arguing that despite the show's intent to teach children not to abuse animals by showing bad behavior, children would likely mimic Nahoul. Mersereau added that teaching children to respect animals helps them respect other people. In an episode that aired in February 2008, it was revealed that Nahoul was terminally ill. He and his parents sought to travel to Al-Arish, Egypt, for medical treatment, but Israeli authorities denied them permission to leave Gaza. He died and was replaced by Assoud, (Note: Arabic: أسّود, lit. 'lion'; also rendered as Assud) a rabbit. Like Farfour, Nahoul's death was referred to in the show as a "martyrdom".

On 29 March 2013, a chicken named Karkour (Note: Arabic: كركور) was introduced. He was described as mischievous by his actor's brother, Refaat Alareer. Karkour made many errors on the show, such as jaywalking and screaming on the telephone. He gained attention from children across the Arab world, who called him to correct his behavior, but by the next episode, he went back to misbehaving.

Nahoul was resurrected in a late 2013 episode, telling children that if they encountered Jews, they should stone or beat them until their faces become as "red as a tomato". In another episode, Maryam explained to Nahoul the concept of negotiations, which involves forgiving the Zionists for the deaths of numerous martyrs and sharing Jerusalem and the Al-Aqsa Mosque, but she later said that she chose the path of resistance. On 28 July 2014, the actor who played Nahoul and Karkour, Mohammed Alareer, was killed by Israeli missiles at the age of 31.

=== Assoud and Nassur ===
Assoud was a rabbit who replaced Nahoul, who died of illness due to the blockade in Gaza, as the show's co-host. He introduced himself as a member of the Palestinian diaspora. In explaining why he is called Assoud, when Arnoub (Note: Arabic: أرنب, lit. 'rabbit') would be more appropriate, he said that "a rabbit is a term for a bad person and coward", and that he "will finish off the Jews and eat them". In "Assoud vs Denmark", he addressed the Jyllands-Posten Muhammad cartoons controversy, vowing to assassinate the magazine's illustrators. In later episodes, Assoud was killed in an airstrike and was succeeded by Nassur, (Note: Arabic: نصور) a brown bear, as the show's co-host.

Nassur claims to have come to the Gaza Strip to join the military wing of Hamas, al-Qassam Brigades, thereby becoming one of the mujahideen. In "Nassur and the Children of Reem Riyashi", he and Saraa hosted the children of Reem Riyashi, the Hamas suicide bomber who carried out the Erez Crossing bombing on 14 January 2004. The children and the two hosts then watched a music video re-enacting the events leading up to the bombing. In a later episode, Nassur said that he knows Hebrew, but when Saraa told him to speak the language, he denied it. Unlike the previous three co-hosts, Nassur survived the show's original run, which ended in October 2009.

Assoud and Nassur, being a rabbit and a bear, respectively, held less religious significance when compared to Farfour and Nahoul. While rabbit meat, which is not mentioned in the Quran, is considered halal by Sunni Muslims, Islamic scholar Ali al-Sistani argued that rabbit and bear meat are considered haram by Shia Muslims. Karagiannis believes that Hamas chose Assoud for his kid-friendly design as opposed to conveying any religious meaning. Daniel Horowitz, in an analysis of fictional bears in American culture, described bears in children's shows as generally friendly and comical, but listed Nassur as one of the exceptions.

== List of episodes ==
Title	Directed by	Original release date
TBA	Samir Abu Muhssen	13 April 2007
Farfour and Saraa discuss martyrdom and the reclamation of Al-Aqsa with Sanabel, a call-in guest. Saraa then discusses the goals of fasting, praying, reciting the Quran, and studying and speaking classical Arabic. Farfour is later caught speaking English by Uncle Hazim, who chastises him. Saraa explains to Farfour that he must have pride in his Arabic language and that Islamic culture is a dominant global power. Saraa adds that the show, whose audience Farfour refers to as "tomorrow's pioneers", shall act as a "nucleus" for the reunification of Gaza, Jerusalem, and Ramallah into one Palestine.
TBA	Samir Abu Muhssen	16 April 2007 or 23 April 2007
Farfour reacts negatively to a song sung by a call-in guest, Esraa (12). Esraa used the word "surrender" in her song and Saraa explains that they do not want to surrender, they want to win. Farfour agrees, telling various American and Israeli politicians, such as George W. Bush, Ehud Olmert, and Condoleezza Rice, that "we will win!"
"Farfour and the AK-47"	Samir Abu Muhssen	30 April 2007
A call-in guest, Harwa (11), sings a song about answering the Gaza Strip town of Rafah with AK-47s, which Farfour enacts in pantomime. Later, a second call-in guest, Muhammad (12) sings about Jerusalem. Saraa also tells Farfour the importance of memorizing the entire Quran.
TBA	Samir Abu Muhssen	11 May 2007
Farfour prepares for and takes his year-end examinations. He cheats using a cheat sheet during the test and when questioned by Uncle Hazim, he explains that the Jews bombed his home, forcing him to leave his school supplies behind. He soon learns that cheating is forbidden and fails the test. Afterwards, Uncle Hazim tells Farfour that he should strive to be like scientists and academics like Jābir ibn Hayyān, and he tells the audience to continue studying, in spite of Jewish efforts. Uncle Hazim then explains to the audience that Islam has made the world more secure, citing Al-Andalus as an example.
TBA	Samir Abu Muhssen	29 June 2007
Farfour's grandfather tells him the history of Tel Aviv, stating that the land was originally called Tel Al-Rabi. He says that the Jews renamed the city after the Israeli Declaration of Independence in 1948. Farfour's grandfather gives him the key and documents to the land before dying, and Farfour expresses anxiety over his ability to liberate Palestine. Farfour is then taken to a room where he is interrogated by an Israeli official trying to buy Farfour's land. After refusing to sell the land and calling him a terrorist, Farfour is beaten to death. Saraa later confirmed that Farfour was martyred while defending his land.
TBA	Samir Abu Muhssen	13 July 2007
Nahoul, the bumblebee cousin of the deceased mouse Farfour, pledges to continue on the path of Islam, referencing martyrdom and the mujahideen in the process. He also explains his intentions to liberate Al-Aqsa from the enemies of God.
TBA	—	10 August 2007
Nahoul and Saraa discuss the occupation of Al-Aqsa, which he suggests is very sad due to being besieged by the Zionists. Nahoul then instructs the audience how to get ahold of the key to Al-Aqsa, which is achieved through morning prayer, martyrdom, and endurance. Saraa then suggests they examine what Nahoul has been doing recently, emphasizing a visit to the Gaza Zoo where he abused animals – connected to a story from the Hadith in which a woman was sent to Hell because she locked up a cat until it died of starvation.
TBA	—	20 December 2007
It is Eid al-Adha, and Saraa performs a song about the liberation of Gaza City, emphasizing victory through force rather than the Oslo Accords. She asks Nahoul if he would like to give holiday greetings, but he expresses sorrow over his losses during past conflicts and his family's health issues. Call-in guests discuss their holiday traditions, including a calf sacrifice, while Nahoul laughs at Yaquin (13), a call-in guest from Gaza whose name he forgot.
TBA	—	1 February 2008
Nahoul is deathly ill. His parents had tried bringing him to Al-Arish, but they were denied from leaving Palestine by Israeli officials. After Nahoul dies, the audience is introduced to his brother, a rabbit named Assoud. When Assoud asks where Nahoul is, the parents at first pretend that he has gone on a walk at night and will be back shortly, but then they finally tell Assoud that Nahoul was martyred. Assoud is heartbroken and is determined to take up Nahoul's path just as Nahoul had taken up Farfour's.
TBA	—	8 February 2008
Travelling to Al-Aqsa TV headquarters, Assoud tells the audience that he is from the Palestinian diaspora carrying the "Key of Return", which he plans to free Al-Aqsa with. Saraa greets him and explains to the audience that he will be the new co-host. Assoud asks her if they seek martyrdom, to which Saraa agrees. Assoud restates that the viewers are the pioneers of tomorrow, and the episode ends with him declaring that he will eat the Jews in the name of God.
"Assoud vs Denmark"	—	22 February 2008
Assoud rails against the Danish Jyllands-Posten cartoonists responsible for the Muhammad cartoons following their reprinting. He and Saraa discuss redeeming Muhammad with Amani, a call-in guest, and they warn the cartoonists that God will punish them for insulting the prophet. Saraa instructs Amani to boycott Danish and Israeli products.
TBA	—	9 May 2008
Assoud visits his grandfather, who recounts the history of Palestinian cities. He explains that Assoud's family's original home, Tel Al-Rabi, was Hebraicized to Tel Aviv, and asserts that it rightfully belongs to Palestine. He provides evidence and notes other name changes, including Isdud for Ashdod, Al-Majdal for Ashkelon, and Beer Sheva for Al-Sab'.
TBA	—	11 July 2008
Assoud, tempted to steal from his father, wrestles with guilt until Iblis, the Islamic name for the devil, convinces him to take three bills, though Assoud ends up taking two. A call-in guest criticizes Assoud's theft, emphasizing its negative effect on his family and its moral and religious consequences. The scene shifts to Saraa and two call-in guests, Asmaa and Nur, explaining the severity of Assoud's actions and Saraa proposing that his hand be chopped off. Nur argues for Assoud's innocence and potential repentance, suggesting leniency. Ultimately, Saraa proposes that his ear be cut off instead while Assoud pleads for mercy.
TBA	—	2 January 2009
Assoud is gravely injured during Israeli attacks on Gaza during the 2008–2009 Israel–Gaza conflict. He succumbs to his injuries and dies some time later in the hospital.
TBA	—	13 February 2009
Nassur has arrived in the Gaza Strip just in time to become Saraa's new co-host. In his debut episode, Nassur shares with the audience his reasons for coming. These reasons include becoming one of the mujahideen, becoming a member of al-Qassam Brigades, performing jihad, and carrying a gun in order to defend the Palestinian youths.
"Nassur and the Children of Reem Riyashi"	—	3 July 2009
Nassur and Saraa spend the day with the children of Reem Riyashi, a Hamas suicide bomber whom the episode calls a shahid. In an attempt to explain Riyashi's patriotism to her children, the hosts created a music video re-enacting her preparing for the 2004 Erez Crossing bombing. After Riyashi's eldest daughter expresses her desire to be like her when she grows up, Saraa delivers a stern warning that the Palestinians will follow Riyashi's example until their homeland is liberated.
"Nassur and the Expulsion of the Jews"	—	22 September 2009
Nassur and Saraa have a disagreement about what the expulsion of the Jews means. Saraa believes in a more peaceful approach, as they should be "chased away" and that nothing should be done to them in the process. Nassur, on the other hand, endorses a more violent method. Saraa eventually concedes, and the two compromise that if the Jews do not want to leave peacefully, they will resort to violence. Nassur goes on to explain his plan that after the expulsion, Jerusalem will become a new Kaaba-like point of pilgrimage for Muslims.
TBA	—	16 October 2009
Nassur and Saraa discuss with a call-in guest the merits of learning English and Hebrew. Saraa explains that knowing their enemies' languages is important in order to establish contact with them. Nassur also says he knows Hebrew, but upon being told by Saraa to speak the language, he immediately denies the claim.
TBA	—	4 December 2009
Nassur and Saraa watch a cartoon contrasting education in Islam with education in Israel. In the cartoon, a Jewish boy drops some money, which is picked up by Muataz, a Palestinian Arab boy. The Jewish boy tells him negative traits his teacher taught him about Arabs did not apply to Muataz. When asked why he did not steal the money, Muataz replies that Islam teaches honesty, countering the Jewish boy's brother's claims. Muataz explains that his family used to have a garden and a large home, which was destroyed by Jews. The Jewish boy asks Muataz what he has learned, to which he says that his land can only be taken back by force.
TBA	—	22 January 2010
Saraa asks a call-in guest how she felt during the 2008–2009 Gaza War. The guest, a ten-year-old girl, denies being afraid of dying during the war, stating that she wanted to be a martyr for God.
TBA	—	5 February 2010
Raad, a call-in guest from Hebron, sings about his father gifting him a machine gun and a rifle, and expresses the desire to join al-Qassam Brigades when he grows up. After singing about Palestine's victory over Israel and the United States, Raad curses during the song, prompting Saraa to interrupt it. She tells him that the program is for children, although Nassur agrees with Raad's song.
TBA	—	12 May 2010
Nassur tells the audience about martyrdom.
TBA	—	29 March 2013
Karkour the chicken invites the grandchildren of Hamas member Umm Nidal onto the show. They discuss achievements such as the creation of the Qassam rocket, which was built by Nidal Farhat. The children share personal stories, including Jinan's recounting of a dream involving al-Qassam commander Emad Akel and her sons before Umm Nidal's return to Gaza, expressing her desire to die in her homeland. One granddaughter calls on Muslim women to defend the Al-Aqsa Mosque and encourages mothers to send their sons toward victory or Heaven. The segment concludes with the children singing about the Qassam rocket and the suicide bomber Fatma Omar An-Najar, followed by Karkour requesting a round of applause.
TBA	—	29 November 2013
Maryam explains the concept of negotiations to Nahoul. She says that it involves forgiving the Zionists for the deaths of multiple martyrs, as well as dividing Jerusalem and giving up half of the Al-Aqsa Mosque to the Israelis. Following Nahoul's backlash, he asks if Maryam supported negotiations, which she denies by making a hand gesture.
TBA	—	2 May 2014
Nahoul asks Qays, (Note: Also rendered as Qais) a guest from Jenin, if there are Jews in his area, to which Qays denies. Meanwhile, Maryam asks another guest, a girl named Tulin, why she wants to be a policewoman. Tulin mentions her uncle Ahmed, who is a policeman, as inspiration. Nahoul tells them what police officers do, and when Maryam asks if Tulin wants to be like Ahmed, she agrees.
TBA	—	16 May 2014
A girl named Zahra Zaed recites "The Bullet", a poem to remember the Nakba. When recalling what happened to her family during the event, she said that she would buy a bullet, no matter how expensive it would be, to which Nahoul showed his support.
TBA	—	23 May 2014
A call-in guest is given a pop quiz about the capitals of various Arab countries, including Jordan, Qatar and Egypt. When asked what the capital of Israel is, she says Israel does not exist, and Nahoul and Maryam affirm her response.
TBA	—	15 July 2022
A costumed man asks a girl what she knows about the Al-Aqsa Mosque, which she refers to as the capital of Palestine that must be defended from Jewish forces. The man discusses liberating Palestine with a boy, who suggests abiding by traditional Islamic law and praying every morning in the mosque. The man later theorizes that the Jews are digging tunnels under the mosque so they can replace the Dome of the Rock with what he claimed to be the false Solomon's Temple.

== Reception and reactions ==
Following Farfour's introduction and death in 2007, Tomorrow's Pioneers garnered global attention. Proponents of the show, including Al-Watan Voice writer Imad Afana, believe that Saraa Barhoum was "incapable of incitement" due to her young age when the show aired. It has also been suggested by Barghouti and Afana that, holding judgment aside, the show's content is simply reflective of life in the occupied territory. Supporters of the show, primarily from Arabic-speaking circles, have labeled critics from Western communities as "Zionists", and argued that, unlike other Arabic television stations, Al-Aqsa TV reflects a view of Palestinian thought unfettered by Western mores. In 2011, Saraa Barhoum backed the program and condemned terrorism, saying that the Palestinians are protecting their country and do not want civilians on any side to die.

The Disney corporation initially had no public statement on the use of Mickey Mouse's image in the Farfour character, since they expected that the program would not have any effect. In May 2007, Disney CEO Robert Iger said the company was "appalled" by Hamas's usage of Mickey Mouse's likeness to spread their message, explaining the initial lack of response came from the belief that Disney's feelings "should have been obvious". Walt Disney's daughter, Diane Disney Miller, asserted to the press that she was more concerned about the general themes of Tomorrow's Pioneers, and she requested that Farfour be written out of the show. Al-Sha'arawi, in an interview with Al Jazeera, denied intentionally copying Mickey Mouse's resemblance, saying that Al-Aqsa TV wanted to create a character popular with children. Following Miller's request to remove Farfour from the show, the Olmert administration requested that Tomorrow's Pioneers be discontinued.

Criticisms concerning the content and methods employed in Tomorrow's Pioneers have come from a variety of sources and communities. Arab critics and psychologists have suggested that the show has potential to introduce bias in children at an age when they are unable to properly differentiate between political viewpoints. Responses from the United States and Israel have been largely critical of Tomorrow's Pioneers, Al-Aqsa TV, and Hamas as a whole. According to a 2010 statement by Anti-Defamation League Deputy National Director Kenneth Jacobson, the show discussed topics such as antisemitism, jihad, and opposition to the United States and the Western world. Additionally, according to Itamar Marcus of Palestinian Media Watch, Hamas's stance on Jews is derived from what the organization believes to be the roots of Islam. Others, such as political scientist Daniel Byman, saw the concept of Tomorrow's Pioneers as comedic, but acknowledged the severity of the situation in Israel and Palestine. Professor Mia Bloom and psychologist John Horgan, who wrote Small Arms: Children and Terrorism (2019), said that Farfour tells the audience that "the ultimate goal is to be a shahid", and the Palestinian Committee for the Defense of the Creed of Ahl al-Sunnah (Note: Arabic: لجنة الدفاع عن عقيدة أهل السنة في فلسطين) has suggested that the show is nothing short of an indoctrination attempt aimed at children. Furthermore, Palestinians within Gaza are not wholly supportive of Hamas's control over the mosques and children's media.

In 2008, the United States House Committee on Foreign Affairs unanimously passed House Resolution 1069, which was described as "condemning Middle East media that incites violence against Americans and the United States and our ally Israel". The House Resolution specifically targeting Al-Aqsa TV for "promoting anti-Semitism and terrorism aimed at Americans and Israelis" and calling on the Bush administration to designate the station as a Specially Designated Global Terrorist (SDGT). Al-Aqsa TV was labeled an SDGT by the United States Department of the Treasury in March 2010; three months later, the French government ordered Eutelsat to cease broadcast of Al-Aqsa TV, as the European Commission said that it violated European anti-incitement laws. Hezbollah criticized the French government, saying the decision violated freedom of speech.

The effects of the reported themes of Tomorrow's Pioneers have also been considered by Western news outlets. In 2012, religious leaders in the United Kingdom worried that due to the program's accessibility on online platforms like YouTube, British children could be influenced by the messages in Tomorrow's Pioneers, particularly those of Assoud. Furthermore, the Association of Muslim Schools in the United Kingdom opposed the program, with spokesman Mohamed Mukadam saying that it "promotes the killing or injuring of human beings". To counteract the purported themes of Hamas-affiliated programming, Israeli Educational Television and the United States Children's Television Workshop created a show about a street where Arabs and Israelis lived together peacefully. The show featured clips created by child psychologists to help viewers who were struggling with trauma.

=== MEMRI translation ===
In 2007, commentators such as Brian Whitaker, the Middle East editor for British newspaper The Guardian; and CNN's Arabic department noted that the transcript of Tomorrow's Pioneers provided by the American non-profit organization MEMRI contains numerous translation errors and undue emphases. Whitaker wrote in a blog for the newspaper that in the video, which shows Farfour eliciting political comments from a young girl named Sanabel, the MEMRI transcript misrepresents the segment where he asks what she will do. MEMRI attributed a sentence said by Farfour to Sanabel, "I'll shoot", while ignoring her reply, "I'm going to draw a picture". Whitaker and others commented that a statement uttered by Sanabel, "We're going to resist" or "We want to resist", had been interpreted by MEMRI as "We want to fight". Also, where MEMRI translated her as saying "We will annihilate the Jews", Whitaker and CNN's Arabic department insisted that she either said "The Jews [will] shoot us" or "The Jews are killing us." Finally, Whitaker believed MEMRI's interpretation "I will commit martyrdom" made Sanabel sound more deliberate, so he and translation studies professorMona Baker suggested "I'll become a martyr" or "we'll become martyrs" as more appropriate alternatives.

Conservative radio host Glenn Beck had planned to run MEMRI's translation on his radio program but was stopped by his producer. Beck then invited Yigal Carmon, the founder and President of MEMRI and a former IDF Intelligence colonel, onto the program. Carmon denounced CNN's Arabic translation and supported the context and syntax of MEMRI's translation of the show. In a 2010 analysis, Baker said that MEMRI, being the most influential translation organization pertaining to the Middle East, adds to negative stereotyping of Arabs and Muslims.

== See also ==
- Social effects of television

== Bibliography ==
- Abdelal, Wael (2016). Hamas and the Media: Politics and Strategy. Abingdon, Oxon: Routledge. ISBN 978-1-138-63916-4. Archived from the original on 3 July 2025.
- Back, Les; Bull, Michael, eds. (2020). The Auditory Culture Reader. Taylor & Francis. ISBN 978-1-000-18490-7.
- Baker, Mona (10 December 2010). "Narratives of terrorism and security: 'accurate' translations, suspicious frames". Critical Studies on Terrorism. 3 (3): 347–364. doi:10.1080/17539153.2010.521639. Archived from the original on 22 April 2023.
- Bloom, Mia; Horgan, John (2019). Small Arms: Children and Terrorism. Cornell University Press. ISBN 978-1-501-71206-7. JSTOR 10.7591/j.ctvfc55rt. Archived from the original on 4 February 2022.
- Byman, Daniel (2011). A High Price. Oxford University Press. ISBN 978-0-199-83174-6.
- Gleis, Joshua L.; Berti, Benedetta (2012). Hezbollah and Hamas: A Comparative Study. Baltimore: Johns Hopkins University Press. ISBN 978-1-421-40615-2. Archived from the original on 3 December 2025.
- El-Haddad, Laila; Alareer, Refaat, eds. (July 2015). Gaza Unsilenced. PM Press. ISBN 978-1-935-98257-9.
- Horowitz, Daniel (18 July 2025). Bear With Me: A Cultural History of Famous Bears in America. Duke University Press. ISBN 978-1-478-06104-5.
- Jarosz, Adam; Kącka, Katarzyna, eds. (12 November 2018). Models of European Civil Society. Cambridge Scholars. ISBN 978-1-527-52144-5. Archived from the original on 28 October 2025.
- Karagiannis, Emmanuel (2020). Akbarzadeh, Shahram (ed.). Routledge Handbook of Political Islam (2nd ed.). Taylor & Francis. ISBN 978-0-429-75717-4.
- Konovalov, A.S. (2025). Пропаганда экстремизма в детском образовательном пространстве (на примере палестинской передачи «Пионеры завтрашнего дня») [The Promotion of Extremism in the Sphere of Children's Education (A Case Study of the Palestinian Program Tomorrow's Pioneers)] (Thesis) (in Russian). doi:10.33979/2587-7534-2025-1-208-216.
- Parker, Thomas David (2019). Avoiding The Terrorist Trap: Why Respect For Human Rights Is The Key To Defeating Terrorism. World Scientific. ISBN 978-1-783-26656-2.
- Pieslak, Jonathan (2009). Sound Targets. Indiana University Press. ISBN 978-0-253-35323-8.
- Pieslak, Jonathan (2015). Radicalism and Music. Wesleyan University Press. ISBN 978-0-819-57585-2.
- Sankey, Margaret (2018). Women and War in the 21st Century. ABC-Clio. ISBN 978-1-440-85766-9. Archived from the original on 28 January 2026.
- Sayfo, Omar (June 2021). Arab Animation. Edinburgh University Press. ISBN 978-1-474-47951-6.
- Zanotti, Jim (2011). Hamas. DIANE Publishing Company. ISBN 978-1-437-94382-5.
