= List of terrorist incidents in 2004 =

This is a timeline of incidents in 2004 that have been labelled as "terrorism" and are not believed to have been carried out by a government or its forces (see state terrorism and state-sponsored terrorism).

== List guidelines ==
- To be included, entries must be notable (have a stand-alone article) and described by a consensus of reliable sources as "terrorism".
- List entries must comply with the guidelines outlined in the manual of style under MOS:TERRORIST.
- Casualty figures in this list are the total casualties of the incident, including immediate casualties and later casualties (such as people who succumbed to their wounds long after the attacks occurred).
- Casualties listed are the victims. Perpetrator casualties are listed separately (e.g. x (+y) indicate that x victims and y perpetrators were killed/injured).
- Casualty totals may be underestimated or unavailable due to a lack of information. A figure with a plus (+) sign indicates that at least that many people have died (e.g. 10+ indicates that at least 10 people have died) – the actual toll could be considerably higher.
- If casualty figures are 20 or more, they will be shown in **bold**. In addition, figures for casualties more than 50 will also be **underlined**.
- In addition to the guidelines above, the table also includes the following categories:

0 people were killed/injured by the incident.
1–19 people were killed/injured by the incident.
20–49 people were killed/injured by the incident.
50–99 people were killed/injured by the incident.
100+ people were killed/injured by the incident.

== January ==
Total incidents: 3

Date	Dead	Injured	Location	Description	Perpetrators	Part of
January 10	4	3	Palopo, Indonesia	2004 Palopo cafe bombing: An explosive device detonated in a karaoke bar, killing four people and injuring three others. Authorities believe that the bomb was left under a table and the perpetrator was not among the victims.	Laskar Jihad	
January 14	4 (+1)	12	Gaza, Israel	2004 Erez Crossing bombing: A suicide bomber blew herself up at one of the entrances to Gaza's main crossing terminal to Israel, killing three Israeli soldiers and a civilian and wounding twelve others. Hamas and the Al-Aqsa Martyrs Brigade (Fatah) jointly claimed responsibility. Hamas stated it used a woman suicide bomber for the first time in order to counter Israeli precautions.	Hamas	Second Intifada
January 29	11 (+1)	50	Jerusalem, Israel	2004 Jerusalem bus 19 bombing: A suicide bomber blew up a bus near the prime minister's residence, killing 11 bystanders and wounding at least fifty. Prime Minister Ariel Sharon was not home at the time. The al-Aqsa Martyrs Brigades claimed responsibility for the attack. Hamas also claimed responsibility for the bombing and denounced al-Aqsa. Hamas also sent a picture of the suicide bomber to the media to verify their claim.	Hamas	Second Intifada

== February ==
Total incidents: 4

Date	Dead	Injured	Location	Description	Perpetrators	Part of
February 1	117	221	Erbil, Iraq	2004 Erbil bombings: 117 people were killed and 221 were injured when suicide bombers wearing explosives separately attacked the offices of both the Kurdistan Democratic Party and the Patriotic Union of Kurdistan. Among the dead in the near simultaneous attacks was the autonomous region's deputy prime minister Sami Abdul Rahman and Turkish businessman Resat Sevkat Akalin who was in Irbil in order to hold talks with Iraqi officials about a fair to be organized by Iraqi-American Businessmen's Association. Ansar al-Sunnah has claimed responsibility.	Ansar al-Sunnah	Iraq War
February 6	40	122	Moscow, Russia	February 2004 Moscow Metro bombing: A blast tore apart a metro train car during morning rush hour. The train was traveling between the Paveletskaya station and the Avtozavodskaya station around 8:40 am. The explosion occurred in the second car of the train, blowing out windows and causing metal pieces of the train to be strewn in all directions. The device had an explosive power of about 4–5 kg of TNT. The device was similar to that used in the commuter train attack in Yessentuki in 2003. Those who survived were forced to walk through the dark tunnel to exit the subway. At least 40 people were killed and 122 injured. Although Russian officials believe that Chechen rebels were behind the attack, particularly terrorists affiliated with Abu al-Walid al-Ghalidi, Chechen leaders deny involvement. Some officials speculated that the attack had occurred in an attempt to disrupt the upcoming March elections. There was also some speculation that there was a connection between al-Qaida and this incident. On March 1, several sources reported that a previously unknown terrorist group, known as Gazoton-Murdash (a Chechen group), claimed responsibility for the incident. The leader of the group said that the attack was intended to commemorate the fourth anniversary of the killing of Chechen civilians by Russian soldiers who took control of Groznyy. Chechen authorities were unsure if the group was a valid organization and were attempting to ascertain the true identity of the group leader, Lom-Ali Chechensky, and determine if the claim of responsibility is accurate. On March 4, Izvestiya reported that the statement of Lom-Ali was actually a reaction to the reported killing of Ruslan Gelayev in Dagestan. The source stated that this claim of responsibility was only propaganda, used to deflect attention from the killing of Gelayev and as retaliation for Russian propaganda. On September 28, Officials announced that they believed Anzor Izhayev was responsible for the blast. They believe that he died in the attack. The suspicion was based on genetic tests.	Riyadus-Salihiin	Second Chechen War
February 7	116	Unknown	Manila, Philippines	2004 SuperFerry 14 bombing: 116 people died aboard SuperFerry 14 after it was bombed by the Abu Sayyaf group in Manila Bay on what is considered the worst terror attack on the nation's history.	Abu Sayyaf	Moro conflict
February 22	8 (+1)	60	Jerusalem, Israel	Liberty Bell Park bus bombing: A suicide bomber killed himself and eight others on a rush hour bus. The al-Aqsa Brigades claimed responsibility for the attack and said the bombing was also a reprisal for the Israeli army's killing of fifteen Palestinians in Gaza two weeks earlier.	Al-Aqsa Martyrs' Brigades	Second Intifada

== March ==
Total incidents: 8

Date	Dead	Injured	Location	Description	Perpetrators	Part of
March 2	65	320	Baghdad, Iraq	2004 Ashura bombings in Iraq: A suicide attack occurred at a Shiite holy shrine, killing over 65 people and injuring at least 320 others. The attack occurred when three suicide bombers detonated their explosives simultaneously. Authorities are blaming this attack, and another on a Shiite shrine in the city of Karbala, on either groups associated with Al Qaeda or loyalists of Abu Mussab al-Zarqawi. The attacks come on one of the holiest days of the Shiite calendar and targeted Shiite pilgrims. Iraqi leaders, who were preparing to sign a new constitution, declared three days of national mourning and postponed signing the constitution until the mourning period was over.	Jama'at al-Tawhid wal-Jihad (suspected)	Iraq War
March 2	106	233	Karbala, Iraq	2004 Ashura bombings in Iraq: At least 106 people were killed and over 233 injured in a suicide attack on the holy Shiite city. At least four bombs detonated (some report up to nine bombs) by the Baghdad Gate, where pilgrims had gathered outside the Shrine of Hussain. This attack came on the same day as another Shiite shrine was attacked in Baghdad and on one of the holiest Shiite holidays. Police suspect a group linked to Al Qaeda in Iraq or loyalists of Abu Musab al-Zarqawi of carrying out the attacks. The perpetrators used a combination of suicide bombs, mortar rounds and planted bombs.	Jama'at al-Tawhid wal-Jihad (suspected)	Iraq War
March 2	47	130	Quetta, Pakistan	2004 Quetta Ashura massacre: At least 47 people were killed and 130 injured following an attack on a Shia Muslim parade. All of the injured suffered bullet wounds. Two bodies were found that appeared to be those of bombers who had blown themselves up. The Shia were observing Ashura. The bombs were reportedly from the group Lashkar-e-Jhangvi.	Lashkar-e-Jhangvi	Sectarianism in Pakistan
March 9	1 (+1)	6	Istanbul, Turkey	March 9, 2004 attack on Istanbul restaurant: Two suicide bombers blew themselves up outside a Masonic lodge in the Kartal neighborhood, killing one person and injuring five others. Only one of the bombers died in the attack, the other was seriously wounded. The attackers began by firing shots with automatic weapons into the Masonic café, they then detonated their bombs at the entrance to the lodge. Witnesses claim that one of the bombers chanted "Allahu Akbar" (God is great) before detonating himself. This led police to believe that the attackers may have been Islamic militants. By March 13, authorities had arrested fifteen people in connection with this attack, including two who had received military training in Afghanistan. CNN reports that the Abu Hafs al-Masri Brigade, the same group that claimed responsibility for the March 11 Madrid train bombings, also claimed responsibility for this incident. At least two of the attackers, Nihat Dogruel (who died in the attack) and Engin Vural (who was injured) had gone to Chechnya to fight after their training in Pakistan/Afghanistan.	Al Qaeda-affiliate	
March 11	191	2,050	Madrid, Spain	2004 Madrid train bombings: 191 people were killed and over 2,000 others were wounded when ten bombs detonated on the train line. The bombs were detonated by cell phones and were left in backpacks. At first the Spanish government blamed the Basque separatist group, ETA, but later the Abu Hafs al-Masri Brigade claimed responsibility on behalf of Al Qaeda. In their claim of responsibility, the Brigade says that Spain was targeted because of their involvement in the war in Iraq. On April 3, as the police were closing in on four suspects, including suspected ringleader Serjame ben Abdelmajid Fakhet, the suspects blew themselves up in their apartment, also killing a police officer.	Moroccan Islamic Combatant Group (suspected)	Islamic terrorism in Europe
March 14	10 (+2)	30	Ashdod, Israel	2004 Ashdod Port bombings: Ten Israeli civilians and two Palestinians suicide-bombers were killed when they blew themselves up. One bomb went off at a citrus fruit packaging factory and the other at an office just outside the perimeter of the port. A cache of grenades was found later hidden in a bag with a false bottom. Hamas and the al-Aqsa Martyr Brigades claimed joint responsibility for the blasts, stating they were in retaliation for recent members deaths in Jenin.	Hamas	Second Intifada
March 19	1	0	Jerusalem, Israel	French Hill attacks: An Israeli student was shot and killed in the French Hill section of East Jerusalem in an attack claimed by the Al-Aqsa Martyrs' Brigades.	Al-Aqsa Martyrs' Brigades	Second Intifada
March 31	4	0	Fallujah, Iraq	2004 Fallujah ambush: Four Blackwater USA contractors were dragged from their car and killed.	Islamists	Iraq War

== April ==
Total incidents: 1

Date	Dead	Injured	Location	Description	Perpetrators	Part of
April 21	73	200	Basra, Iraq	21 April 2004 Basra bombings: Suicide attackers detonated five simultaneous car bombs against police buildings during morning rush hour killing 68 people and wounding up to 200 people. Five of the injured died overnight from their wounds bringing the death toll up to 73. These were the largest attacks to hit the mainly Shiite city, since the US-led occupation began one year ago.	Islamist insurgents	Iraq War

== May ==
Total incidents: 4

Date	Dead	Injured	Location	Description	Perpetrators	Part of
May 2	7 (+4)	18	Yanbu, Saudi Arabia	2004 Yanbu attack: Four assailants fired against the personnel of a Saudi contractor. Two Americans, two Britons, an Italian and an Australian were killed and nineteen Saudi police officers were injured. The security forces returned fire killing three with the last attacker dying of his wounds later.	Al Qaeda (suspected)	
May 9	10	56	Grozny, Russia	2004 Grozny stadium bombing: A bomb exploded in the Dynamo stadium in the Chechen capital, killing the republic's president Akhmad Kadyrov. The explosion was caused by a bomb planted inside a concrete pillar and occurred at 10:35am during a parade and concert celebrating the 59th anniversary of the victory of Germany in World War 2. The blast tore a hole in the section designate for dignitaries. Khussein Isayev, chairman of the Republic's state council, and Adlan Khasanov, a reporter for Reuters, were also killed in the blast. Col. Gen. Valery Baranov, the commander of the Russian military in the northern Caucasus was gravely wounded. Although estimates of total casualties varied, at least ten people were killed and around fifty more injured. Officials believe that the blast was detonated by remote control and was intentionally installed below the VIP section. Rebel leader Shamil Basayev claimed responsibility for the blast.	Riyadus-Salihiin	Second Chechen War
May 21	3	100	Sylhet, Bangladesh	2004 Shah Jalal bombing: A powerful bomb at the shrine of 14th-century saint Shahjalal killed three and injured over 100. Authorities believe that the attack was aimed at the newly appointed British High Commissioner to Bangladesh, who was also critically injured in the blast.	Harkat-ul-Jihad al-Islami	Internal conflict in Bangladesh
May 29/30	22	25	Riyadh, Saudi Arabia	2004 Khobar massacre: Four militants wearing military-style clothing stormed the oil industry office compounds spraying gunfire and killing 13 people. The militants then moved up the street to Oasis Residential Resort. The militants first tried to ram the gate with an explosives-rigged car but when that failed they scaled the wall. They then proceeded to sort out Muslims from non-Muslims and corralled at least fifty hostages in a hotel. Nine hostages were killed and forty-one rescued by Saudi commandos. Only one of the attackers was captured. Al-Qaeda claimed responsibility for the attack.	Al Qaeda in the Arabian Peninsula	

== June ==
Total incidents: 4

Date	Dead	Injured	Location	Description	Perpetrators	Part of
June 9	0	22	Cologne, Germany	2004 Cologne bombing: A pipe bomb was detonated in an area popular with Turks. The bombing was unsolved until a group called National Socialist Underground claimed responsibility on a DVD found in 2011.	National Socialist Underground	
June 21/22	92	106	Nazran, Russia	2004 Nazran raid: A group of Ingush and Chechen militants raided Ingushetia's largest city and attacked several government buildings. In total 92 people, almost all of them civilians and members of the security forces were killed.	Ingush Jamaat	Second Chechen War
June 24	62	220	Mosul, Iraq	2004 Mosul bombings: Five car bombs targeted four police stations and a hospital.	Islamists	Iraq War
June 26	12	12	Poonch District, India	2004 Teli Katha massacre: Militants shot and killed a dozen people when they opened fire at houses. Most of the victims were family members of the local village defense committee. Twelve people were also injured in the attack.	Lashkar-e-Taiba	Insurgency in Jammu and Kashmir

== July ==
Total incidents: 2

Date	Dead	Injured	Location	Description	Perpetrators	Part of
July 12/13	18 (+15)	Unknown	Avtury, Russia	2004 Avtury raid: A group of Chechen separatists raided the village and engaged in a fire fight with security forces. The government claimed they lost 18 men and killed 15 rebels while the rebels claimed to have killed up to 50 members of security while losing five men.	Arab Mujahideen in Chechnya and ChRI	Second Chechen War
July 30	2 (+3)	9	Tashkent, Uzbekistan	American and Israeli embassy bombings in Tashkent: Three suicide bombers detonate outside the American and Israeli embassies and the office of the Chief Prosecutor of Uzbekistan. Two guards at the Israeli embassy were killed, seven people were wounded at the prosecutor's office, and two were wounded at the American embassy. No one of the casualties were Israeli or Americans. Islamic Jihad Union claimed responsibility.	Islamic Jihad Union	

== August ==
Total incidents: 8

Date	Dead	Injured	Location	Description	Perpetrators	Part of
August 1	12	37	Baghdad and Mosul, Iraq	2004 Iraq churches attacks: Six bombs blew up churches, killing at least 12 people and wounding many more. A car bomb was detonated outside an Armenian Church in Baghdad's upper market district. Two people were killed and twenty-two wounded in this and the other attack in the same neighborhood.	Islamist insurgents	Iraq War
August 15	18	40	Dhemaji, India	2004 Dhemaji school bombing: 18 people, mostly children and their mothers, were killed when a bomb exploded outside Dhemaji College where they had gathered for an independence day parade. The Indian government blamed the United Liberation Front of Assam (UFLA) for the attack but they denied responsibility.	United Liberation Front of Assam	Assam conflict
August 21	24	300+	Dhaka, Bangladesh	2004 Dhaka grenade attack: 13 grenades were thrown into a crowd at an anti-terrorism rally organized by the Awami League.	Harkat-ul-Jihad-al-Islami	Internal conflict in Bangladesh
August 21/22	76 (+50)	Unknown	Grozny, Russia	2004 Grozny raid: Hundreds of Chechen rebels led by Dokka Umarov raided the Chechen capital and engaged in firefights with security forces. At least 58 policemen, 5 federal soldiers, 13 civilians and 50 militants were killed.	ChRI	Second Chechen War
August 24	90	0	Tula and Rostov, Russia	2004 Russian aircraft bombings: Two airplanes that flew out of Domodedovo International Airport in Moscow were destroyed by suicide bombers, killing all 90 people on both flights.	Riyadus-Salihiin	Second Chechen War
August 26	74	315	Kufa, Iraq	2004 Kufa shelling: The main mosque was a hit by a barrage of mortar	Islamist insurgents	Iraq War
August 31	11	50	Moscow, Russia	August 2004 Moscow Metro bombing: A female suicide bomber blew herself up outside of the entrance to the Rizhshkaya subway station and the Krestovskiy shopping center. The explosive device was equivalent to 2 kg of TNT. The explosion was intended to occur inside the station, but the woman apparently was afraid of the police searching people and papers at the entrance to the station. The Islambouli Brigade of Martyrs claimed responsibility for the attack. 11 people were killed in the attack and at least fifty wounded. The suicide bomber was identified as Roza Magayeva, the sister of Aminat Nagayev who is believed to be responsible for one of the two airliner crashes on August 24. In a letter, Shamil Basayev claimed responsibility for the incident.	Riyadus-Salihiin	Second Chechen War
August 31	16 (+2)	85	Beersheba, Israel	Beersheba bus bombings: Two buses near the municipality building were blown up by a suicide bomber. The suicide bomber took advantage of the fact that the two buses were standing together. He blew up a bomb on one bus and then exploded a second bomb on the second bus. At least 15 people were killed and around 85 injured. The military wing of Hamas claimed responsibility for the attack, saying that it as a response to the assassination of Hamas founder Sheikh Ahmad Yassin.	Hamas	Second Intifada

== September ==
Total incidents: 2

Date	Dead	Injured	Location	Description	Perpetrators	Part of
September 1–3	354 (+31)	783	Beslan, Russia	Beslan school hostage crisis: A group of thirty to thirty-five (sources varied) armed Chechen separatists, including men and women, many wearing suicide bomber belts, seized a school taking children, parents, and teachers hostage in the gymnasium. At least ten of the hostage-takers appeared to be from Arab countries. A series of explosions shook the school, followed by a fire which engulfed the building and a chaotic gun battle between the hostage-takers and Russian security forces. Ultimately, at least 334 hostages were killed, including 186 children.	Riyadus-Salihiin	Second Chechen War
September 22	2 (+1)	15	Jerusalem, Israel	French Hill attacks: A female suicide bomber detonated her bomb at the French Hill intersection. She had tried to enter the protected soldier's pickup station but has been prevented. Two people were killed and 15 injured. The blast was targeted at the large number of civilians at the station. The military wing of al-Fatah claimed responsibility.	Fatah	Second Intifada

== October ==
Total incidents: 3

Date	Dead	Injured	Location	Description	Perpetrators	Part of
October 2	30	100	Dimapur, Nagaland, India	2004 Dimapur bombings: Two powerful bombs were set off simultaneously—one at the Dimapur railway station and the other at the Hong Kong Market resulting in thirty deaths and wounding over hundred others.	Islamic extremists	
October 7	38	100	Pakistan, Pakistan	2004 Multan bombing: A powerful car bomb explosion killed over 38 people and injured at least a hundred others. The explosion occurred after people were going home following the end of a religious rally among members of the outlawed Sunni Muslim group Millat-e-Islamia, who were marking the anniversary of their slain leader Azam Tariq. The bomb was a remote-detonate device. The attacks may have been in response to a bombing of a Shia mosque days before.	Shia extremists	Sectarianism in Pakistan
October 7	34 (+2)	171	Ras al-Shitan, Egypt	2004 Sinai bombings: In the final of three coordinated attacks in the Sinai, a car-bomb was detonated outside of al-Badiyah campground. The attacker, believed to be either Mohamed Ahmed Saleh Flayfil or Hammad Gaman Gomah (both Egyptians), drove a Nissan to the entrance to the camp and fled shortly before the bomb detonated. In the two attacks, it is believed that two people were killed and some twelve injured. The majority of the fatalities in the coordinated operations occurred in the Taba attack, in which 400 lbs of explosives were used to sheer off the front of the ten story Hilton hotel. On October 26, authorities arrested five Egyptians in connection with these attacks. The Battalions of the Martyr Abdullah Azzam, Al-Qaeda in the Levant and Egypt claimed responsibility for the attacks, but their claim was never verified.	Palestinian group	Arab–Israeli conflict

== November ==
Total incidents: 2

Date	Dead	Injured	Location	Description	Perpetrators	Part of
November 1	3 (+1)	32	Tel Aviv, Israel	Carmel Market bombing: A teenage Palestinian suicide bomber struck on outdoor market, killing at least three people and wounding more than thirty. The bomber hit the Carmel Market at 11 am, causing a big explosion using 5 kg of explosives. The attack was claimed by the Popular Front for the Liberation of Palestine (PFLP). The group said they carried out the attack to show that Arafat's illness would not stop the fight against the Israeli occupiers and as a warning to those who talk of reducing the resistance movement. Israeli forces razed the home of the suicide bomber the following day in retaliation.	Popular Front for the Liberation of Palestine	Second Intifada
November 13	6	3	Poso, Indonesia	2004 Poso bus bombing: A bomb exploded on a minibus carrying Christians.	Jemaah Islamiyah (suspected)	

== December ==
Total incidents: 3

Date	Dead	Injured	Location	Description	Perpetrators	Part of
December 19	14	50	Karbala, Iraq	2004 Karbala and Najaf bombings: A car bomb exploded near a bus stop, killing 14 and wounding at least 50. The attack also occurred near the twin shrines of Hussein and Abbas. Grand Ayatollah Ali al-Sistani also lived near the site of the blast. It was unclear if he was a target or not. The attack occurred on the same day as a bombing in Najaf.	Islamist insurgents	Iraq War
December 19	50	91	Najaf, Iraq	2004 Karbala and Najaf bombings: A car bomb exploded in the middle of a funeral procession. The bomb was detonated only 300 yards from the Imam Ali Shrine, an important Shiite shrine. Nearby were crowds of people waiting for buses. At least fifty people were killed and ninety-one wounded in this attack. The explosion ruptured water pipes and caused damage to nearby shops. The blast occurred only one day after a bomb attack in Karbala.	Islamist insurgents	Iraq War
December 21	22	72	Mosul, Iraq	2004 Forward Operating Base Marez bombing: A suicide bomber from Ansar al-Sunnah detonated at a mess hall tent at a Forward Operating Base.	Ansar al-Sunnah	Iraq War

== See also ==
- List of non-state terrorist incidents
- ETA attacks in 2004
- List of Qassam rocket attacks
- List of Palestinian suicide attacks
- List of Palestinian rocket attacks on Israel, 2001–2006
