= If I Must Die =

2011 poem by Refaat Alareer

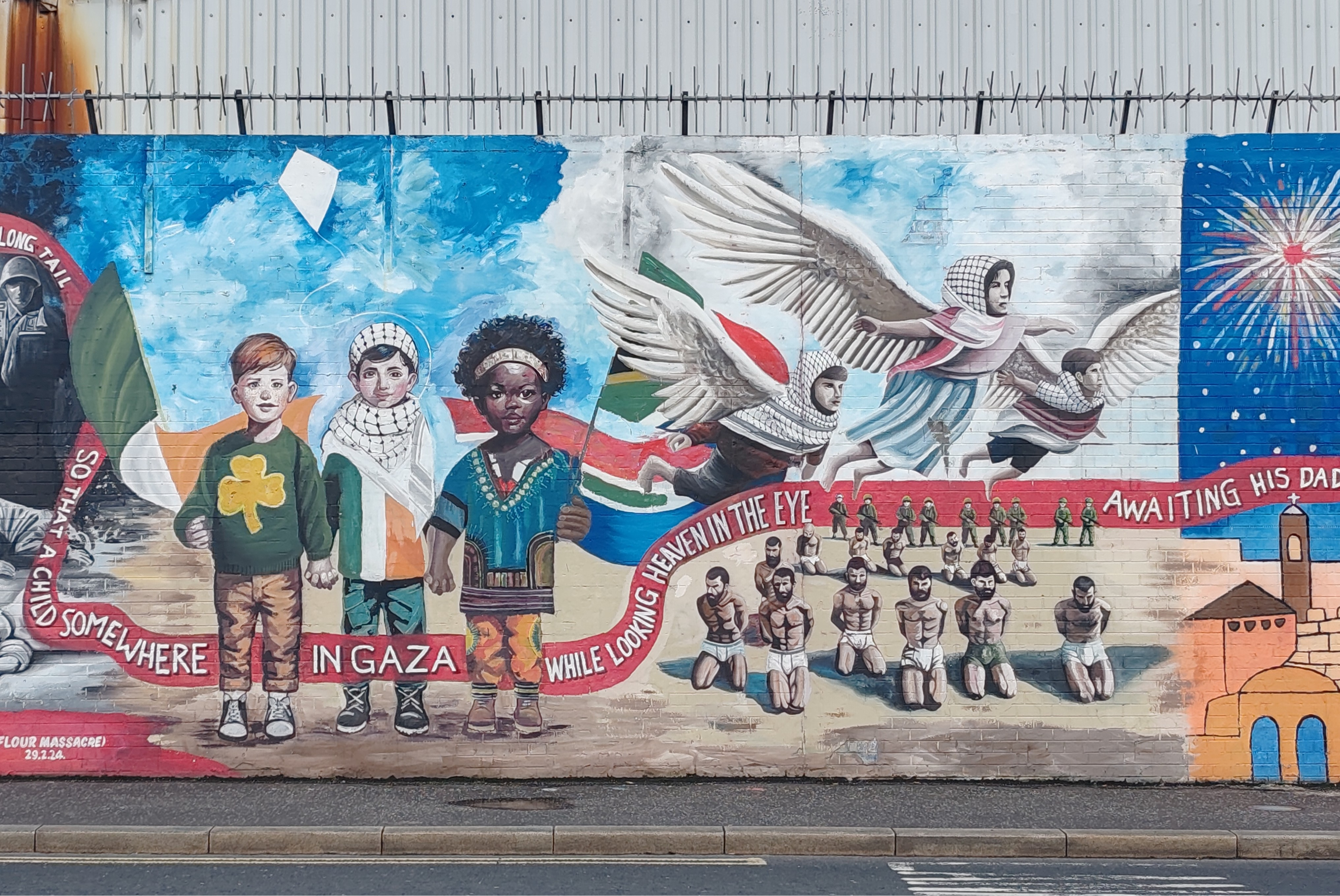
The poem inscribed on a mural in Belfast in 2026

"If I Must Die" is a fatalistic 91-word poem by Palestinian poet and scholar Refaat Alareer, written for his daughter. The poem became famous following the killing of its author, along with six members of his family, in an Israeli airstrike.

The poem has been recognized as a testament to the resilience, resistance, and humanity of the Palestinian people during the Gaza genocide. It has been analyzed in academic, journalistic, and cultural contexts for its evocative imagery and its symbolic challenge to narratives of occupation and marginalization.

It has been described as one of the most widely known poems of the 21st century, and has been translated in over 40 languages. Professor Nazmi al-Masri wrote that the poem “travelled across the world because it expresses something very simple but very powerful: the fear of disappearing without being remembered”.

The closing words of the poem were inscribed on Alareer’s tombstone: “If I must die; Let it bring hope; Let it be a tale”.

== Background and authorship ==
Refaat Alareer was a professor of English literature at the Islamic University of Gaza and co-founder of the We Are Not Numbers project, which amplified the voices of young Palestinian writers. Alareer began writing poetry in English in response to the Gaza War (2008–2009), seeking to directly address an international audience without the barrier of translation; Alareer believed Palestinians must "speak for themselves" in the language of global discourse to counteract dominant narratives about their struggle.

The poem gained widespread attention after Alareer was killed in an Israeli airstrike on December 6, 2023. In 2024, OR Books posthumously published If I Must Die: Poetry and Prose, a collection of Alareer's writings.

== Description ==
The poem opens with:

If I must die,
you must live
to tell my story
to sell my things
to buy a piece of cloth
and some strings...

The poem portrays death as a form of resistance, aligning with Palestinian traditions of sumud, which Alareer explicitly addressed in previous literary works such as Gaza Writes Back. According to Salih Altoma, Alareer’s choice to write in English reflects an effort to address international audiences.

== Reception, impact and legacy ==
Following Alareer’s death, "If I Must Die" went viral, viewed over 33 million times on Twitter alone and translated into more than 100 languages. The poem has been publicly read at vigils, protests, and artistic gatherings around the world.

Assistant Professor Amanda Joyce Hall notes a connection with the 1919 poem If We Must Die.

It has been described as one of the most widely known poems of the 21st century.

== Bibliography ==
- Abourahme, Nasser; Day, Iyko (4 March 2025). "Introduction. "If I Must Die": Writing from Gaza". Critical Ethnic Studies. 9 (1). doi:10.5749/CES.0901.11.
- Ali, Fatma R. R.; Alteib, Inass A.; Albur, Hajer M. M. (6 September 2024). "Resilience in the Face of Mortality: A Literary Analysis of Rifaat Alareer's If I Must Die". Global Journal of Research in Education & Literature: 8–17. doi:10.5281/ZENODO.13711404. ISSN 2583-2662.
- Altoma, Salih (21 June 2024), "The Story of a Poem: Refaat Alareer's 'If I Must Die'", ARABLIT & ARABLIT QUARTERLY
- Aqra, Lujain; Hamamra, Bilal (Spring 2024). "Letter from Palestine: Resistance through Storytelling in Refaat Al-Areer's "If I Must Die"". Janus Unbound: Journal of Critical Studies. III (II). Memorial University of Newfoundland: 7–12.
- Hussein, Asma (2025), "Refaat Alareer's "If I Must Die": The Death of the Author, the Afterlife of the Tale", Arab Studies Quarterly, 47 (2): 85–101, doi:10.13169/arabstudquar.47.2.0005
