= Salih Altoma =

Iraqi professor and poet

Sayyid Dr. Salih Altoma
- السيد صالح طعمة
- Born: Salih Jawad Kadhim Tumah; September 23, 1929 (age 96); Karbala, Kingdom of Iraq
- Education: University of Baghdad (BA); Harvard University (EdD)

Salih Jawad Altoma (Arabic: صالح جواد آل طعمة; b. September 23, 1929) is an Iraqi poet, author, and professor emeritus of near eastern languages and cultures at the Hamilton Lugar School of Global and International Studies and an adjunct professor emeritus of comparative literature at Indiana University.

== Early life and education ==
Altoma was born in Karbala in 1929 into the Tumah branch of the noble Al Faiz family that hold high status in Karbala. Altoma claims agnatic descent from Musa al-Kadhim, the seventh Shia Imam. His ancestors on some occasions ruled Karbala, and held custodianship of its holy sites.

He grew up studying under a Shaykh Muhammad al-Sarraj al-Asadi, until the government invaded his class and took his students into the newly opened state schools. He studied at a Bab al-Taag primary school in Karbala, which later became the Sibt School. He concluded his primary and secondary studies in Karbala, and then went to earn his B.A from Baghdad University in 1952.

In 1954, Altoma went to the United States as part of Iraq's cultural mission, and earned his Ed.D. from Harvard University in 1957.

== Career ==
Altoma returned to Baghdad in 1957 and was assigned as a teacher in the High Teachers' House (later Faculty of Education in the University of Baghdad). After the 14 July revolution, he was chosen as member of the Cultural Unity Committee with the United Arab Republic, and a director of curricula and textbooks, at the Iraqi ministry of education.

In 1961, Altoma was assigned as cultural attaché for Iraq in the United States, until 1963, and remained there, settling in Indiana.

He joined Indiana University's faculty in 1964. During his tenure, he also served as director of the Middle Eastern Studies Program from 1986-1991 and chair of the near eastern languages and cultures department from 1985-1991.

Altoma received several fellowships including Harvard Research Fellowship, Indiana University Ford International Program Fellowship, National Endowment for Humanities, American Research Center in Egypt Fellowship and Fulbright Fellowship.

In 2014, he received the Middle East Studies Association Mentoring Award for his exceptional teaching and contributions to Middle East studies.

The courses that Altoma taught included:

- Arabic-Western Literary Relations
- American Reception of Contemporary Arabic Literature
- The Literature of the Arabian Peninsula
- Classical/Modern Arabic Literature
- Modern Arabic Fiction
- Modern Islamic Literature in English Translation
- Arabic Poetry

== Works ==
- A Dictionary of Modern Linguistic Terms: English-Arabic/Arabic-English, with M. H. Bakalla. Beirut: Librairie du Liban, 1983.
- Modern Arabic Poetry in English Translation: A Bibliography. Tangier: King Fahd School of Translation, 1993.
- Guest editor. Yearbook of Comparative and General Literature 48 (2000).
- Modern Arabic Literature in Translation: A Companion. London: Saqi Books, 2005.
- Iraq's Modern Arabic Literature: A Guide to English Translations Since 1950. Lanham. Scarecrow Press, 2010. Covering 60 years of materials, this bibliography cites translations, studies, and other writings, which represent Iraq's national literature, including recent works of numerous Iraqi writers living in Western exile.

Altoma, has written numerous reports and reviews, and continues to do so at 95 years of age. His latest review, is called The Story of a Poem: Refaat Alareer’s ‘If I Must Die’, and is about one of the early poems of leading Palestinian academic and poet, Refaat Alareer chose to write in English (not in Arabic, his native language).

== See also ==
- Al Faiz Family
- Middle Eastern Studies
- Arabic Literature
