= Council for European Palestinian Relations =

The Council for European Palestinian Relations (CEPR) was a not-for-profit organisation which advocates for Palestinians' rights in Europe. The organisation was banned in December 2013 from Israel by Defense Minister Moshe Ya’alon, saying the organization serves as Hamas’ representative in Europe. The Israeli ban extends to the members of CEPR, that includes four European MPs. Dr Arafat Shoukri, the director of the organisation, said that CEPR will take legal action against the Israeli decision. He claimed that the decision of the Israel defense minister is based on false accusations and has no shred of truth, and they will challenge it through legal means. On its website the organization claimed that it "is working to improve the dialogue between Europe and the Arab world, with the objective of restoring Palestinian rights in accordance with international law, as part of a just solution to the Israeli-Palestinian conflict."

The director of CEPR was Arafat Shoukri, a resident of London, Ramy Abdu was the assistant director. The organization was registered in Belgium and has offices in Brussels and London.

== Aims and activities ==
The CEPR was engaged in political lobbying work across Europe, particularly the European and British Parliaments on behalf of the Hamas-led Gaza Government.

According to the CEPR's former website, the aim of the CEPR's work was to increase understanding of the Palestine issue and related Middle Eastern issues in Europe and to increase dialogue between European, Arab and Middle Eastern politicians.

The CEPR focused on taking parliamentary delegations to the Middle East while meeting with Hamas leadership in the area. In 2010, the CEPR was involved in taking a large number of European parliamentarians to the Gaza Strip and Egypt on the anniversary of 'Operation Cast Lead’. The delegation, the biggest ever to Gaza, was led by British Labour MP Gerald Kaufman and included over 50 parliamentarians of 13 European countries. The visit included meetings with the United Nations Relief and Works Agency (UNRWA), Prime Minister Ismail Haniyeh of Hamas, Egyptian Foreign Minister Ahmed Aboul Gheit and Secretary General of the Arab League Amr Moussa.

In October 2010, the CEPR took a delegation of parliamentarians from the European, British, Scottish and Polish parliaments to the West Bank and Jordan. The trip included meetings with Hamas representatives in the Palestinian Legislative Council seeking sanctuary at the International Red Cross, UNRWA Director John Ging and Jordanian Prime Minister Samir al-Rifai and Foreign Minister Nasser Judeh.

Between 6–9 February 2011 the CEPR was the co-organiser of a delegation of seven European parliamentarians to Lebanon, where they met with senior government figures including President Suleiman and Prime Minister Designate Mikati and visited the Palestinian refugee camps Bourj el-Barajneh, Nahr al-Bared and Shatila.

Following the popular uprising in Egypt in February 2011, the CEPR organised a delegation there to meet organisations likely to have a role to play in the forming of a new look Egyptian government and to engage with them on the issue of ending the blockade of the Gaza Strip. The CEPR has in the past held meetings with EU High Representative for Common Foreign and Security Policy Javier Solana, President of the European Parliament Jerzy Buzek and President Bashar al-Assad of Syria.

The CEPR also prepared research briefs for parliamentarians and for download on their website.

CEPR ceased operations in 2017.

== Leadership ==
The director of CEPR was Arafat Shoukri, who is also the executive director of the Palestinian Return Centre. Ramy Abdu was the assistant director and Palestine Office Manager in Gaza.

Notwithstanding, on several occasions Shoukri has denied being a Hamas advocate. An article posted by Haaretz reports Shoukri declaring: “The CEPR is a non profit organisation and is not affiliated to any political party whether inside or outside Palestine.” However, Shoukri played a prominent role in the negotiations to include Hamas-controlled Gaza into the political process aimed to reach a peaceful agreement between Israel and the Fatah-controlled Palestinian Authority.

The Comité de Bienfaisance et de secours aux Palestiniens (CBSP) was designated a terrorist entity in 2003 by the U.S. Department of the Treasury.

== Controversy ==
Hamas was included in the blacklist EU-designated terrorist groups in 2003. Hamas is banned by Jordan and designated a terrorist organization by the United States, the EU, Canada, Israel, and Japan.

CEPR was outlawed by Israel in December 2013. As a consequence, the Israeli authorities are authorized to confiscate CEPR's money and to try its members, associates and contributors. Among the implications of the 2013 designation as an “illicit association” is that four European members of Parliament who are also members of CEPR are in danger of arrest on entering Israel. An article recently published by The Independent revealed that the European members of Parliament involved were the British Labour member of European Parliament Richard Howitt, the German representative Alexandra Thein, Swiss member of Parliament Geri Müller and British member of Parliament Norman Warner. Norman Warner “was a health minister in Prime Minister Tony Blair’s government, and now serves on the All-Party Parliamentary Group for Palestine.” According to the same article, Clare Short, the former British International Development Secretary who resigned in 2003, could also be arrested as she was a prominent member of CEPR at the time of the CEPR's designation.
