= Patrick Kingsley (journalist) =

British journalist

- Education: University of Cambridge
- Occupation: Journalist
- Employer: The New York Times

Patrick Kingsley is a British journalist and currently an editor of The New York Times covering European affairs, formerly serving as the Jerusalem bureau chief of The New York Times. He previously served as a foreign correspondent for The Guardian.

== Early life and education ==
Kingsley attended Eton College. He studied English literature at the University of Cambridge.

== Career ==
Kingsley joined The Guardian in 2010. He was appointed the paper's first-ever migration correspondent in 2015.

He was named foreign affairs journalist of the year at the 2015 British Journalism Awards for his coverage of the European refugee crisis.

He authored The New Odyssey: The Story of Europe's Refugee Crisis, which was published in 2016 by Guardian Faber.

According to his online biography, Kingsley speaks Arabic and is studying Hebrew.

The New York Times appended a 266-word editor's note to a 2021 article by Kingsley about Palestinian professor Refaat Alareer which said that Kingsley's article "did not accurately reflect" Alareer's views of Israeli poetry.
