= 2004 Erez Crossing bombing =

2004 suicide bombing

Coordinates: 31.5582°N 34.5448°E

Erez Crossing bombing
- Part of the Second Intifada militancy campaign
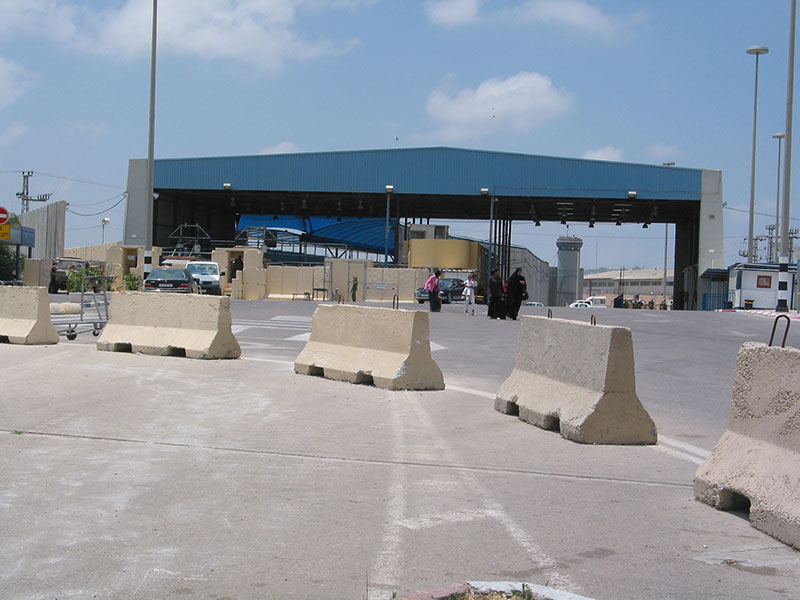
- Erez Crossing, 2005

- The attack site
- Location: Erez Crossing, Southern District, Israel
- Date: January 14, 2004 c. 9:30 am
- Attack type: Suicide bombing
- Deaths: 5 (including the perpetrator)
- Injuries: 10
- Perpetrators: Hamas; Al-Qassam Brigades; Fatah; Al-Aqsa Martyrs Brigades
- Assailant: Reem Salah Riyashi

The Erez Crossing bombing was a Palestinian suicide bombing which occurred on January 14, 2004, at the Erez Crossing, a pedestrian and cargo terminal located on the Gaza–Israel barrier. Four Israelis and the suicide bomber were killed. Additionally, 10 people, including four Palestinians, were injured in the attack. The bomber was a 22-year-old Palestinian mother of two from Gaza named Reem Riyashi. Hamas and al-Aqsa Martyrs Brigades claimed joint responsibility for the attack, stating that it was a response to weeks of Israeli incursions into West Bank cities that had left approximately 25 Palestinians dead.

== Attack ==
On Wednesday, 14 January 2004, around 9:30 am, Reem al-Reyashi, a female Palestinian suicide bomber, approached the pedestrian/cargo terminal Erez Crossing. It is a border crossing where thousands of Palestinians who cross each day from Gaza to work in a neighbouring industrial zone are processed. The IDF reported that when she reached the metal detector at the terminal, Riyashi pretended to be disabled and claimed to have metal plates in her leg that sounded the alarm. She asked to have a body search instead. After being taken to an area where a group of soldiers and policemen were checking bags, she was told to wait for a woman to come and search her in a cubicle. It was then that she detonated the concealed 2 kg explosive device, which killed herself, two Israeli soldiers, a policeman and a civilian security worker, and injured seven other Israelis and four Palestinians.

Three soldiers and one civilian employee of the Erez crossing were killed in the attack. 10 people, including four Palestinians, were injured in the attack.

Later that night, Israel handed her body back to Hamas, where it was picked up by an ambulance. Hamas members stated that a coffin was brought to Al-Shifa Hospital, where she was placed and then taken to Gaza City's main mosque, where prayers were held, before she was buried. 20 men carried the coffin, wrapped in a green flag, on which was written "There is no God but Allah," while 100 people shot rifles in the air, waved green flags, and shouted slogans.

== Victims ==
- Staff Sergeant Tzur Or, 20, of Rishon Lezion
- Corporal Andrei Kegeles, 19, of Nahariya
- Gal Shapira, 28, of Ashkelon
- Staff Sergeant Vladimir Trostinsky, 22, of Rehovot

== Perpetrators ==
Hamas and al-Aqsa Martyrs Brigades claimed joint responsibility for the attack. A Hamas spokesman stated that the suicide bomber was a 22-year-old Palestinian mother of two from Gaza named Reem Riyashi (Arabic: ريم صالح الرياشي, romanized: Rīm Ṣāliḥ ar-Riyāshī). She was born in 1981 or 1982 in Sheik Ajlin, Gaza City, Gaza Strip. Unlike most bombers, Riyashi came from a wealthy family. She was the eighth Palestinian female suicide bomber, and the second to have left behind children. Riyashi was the first female suicide bomber sent by Hamas, whose spiritual leader at the time, Ahmed Yassin had initially objected to the involvement of women in such actions, altering this position shortly before his assassination by the Israel Defense Forces (IDF) in March 2004.

After having two children, Riyashi recorded a message. She was dressed in military fatigues, a black hijab and a black long-sleeve skirt, and she held an AK-47 assault rifle. She expressed her dream of being the first woman turning "[her] body into deadly shrapnel against the Zionists" since she was 13. She added that, while she did love her children, her love to see God was stronger. She said she "always wanted to be the first woman to carry out a martyrdom operation, where parts of [her] body can fly all over and "knocking the door of heaven"." The video was published after the attack.

== Reactions ==
=== Family reaction ===
At the time of Riyashi's death, her son Obeida was three years old, and her daughter Doha 18 months old. A traditional memorial tent was immediately set up by her family near her home in Gaza City. Riyashi's relatives had no explanation for why a mother with children so young would choose to become a suicide bomber. Her brother-in-law, Yusuf Awad, denounced the attack, adding that "we don't accept women doing such things."

=== Palestinian public ===
Hamas received widespread criticism among Palestinians and some supporters for deploying a young mother as a suicide bomber and for publishing photographs of Riyashi posing with her children and weapons. In one photograph, Riyashi's son is clutching what appears to be a mortar shell and is wearing a Hamas headband while another picture shows Riyashi gazing at her children.

Hamas defended its decision to release the photographs stating that the pictures revealed the depth of the despair of Palestinian women and the depth of their desire to defeat the occupation. Sheikh Ahmad Yassin said that Riyashi's example would inspire more women to die in the fight against Israel, urging more to volunteer. Hani Almasri, a Palestinian journalist at Al-Ayyam, told the Associated Press that Hamas' decision to release the photographs damaged the Palestinian cause and that Hamas would gain little advantage by these actions since in his opinion, there was less support from among the Palestinian people for military operations than had been the case previously.

=== Cultural depictions ===
Riyashi's children appeared on a 2009 episode of Palestinian children's TV show Tomorrow's Pioneers.

== See also ==
- Female suicide bomber
- Wafa al Bass
- List of terrorist incidents, 2004
