= Ramy Abdu =

Palestinian financial expert and human rights advocate

- رامي عبده
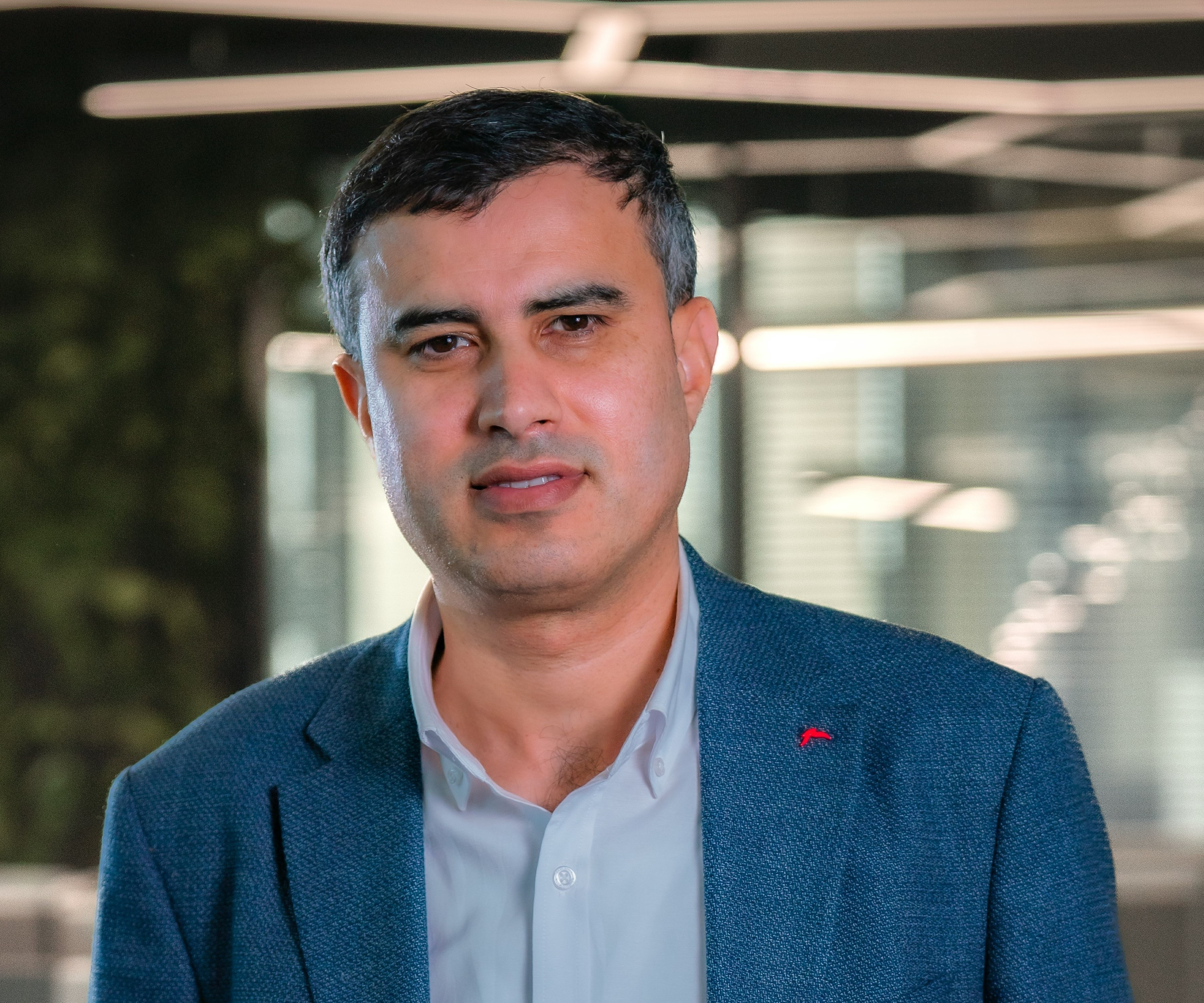
- Abdu in 2023
- Education: PhD in Law and Finance from the Manchester Metropolitan University

Ramy Abdu (Arabic: رامي عبده) (or Ramy Abdo) is a Palestinian financial expert and human rights advocate who was born in the Gaza Strip. He is the founder and chairman of the Euro-Mediterranean Human Rights Monitor, established in 2011. As the chairman of the Euro-Mediterranean Human Rights Monitor, Abdu delivered several oral statements and took part in different events at the United Nations Human Rights Council, addressing human rights violations in the Middle East and North Africa Region.

== Early life and education ==
Ramy Abdu holds a PhD and MRes in Law and Finance from the Manchester Metropolitan University, and an MBA in Finance from the University of Jordan. Abdu worked as a project and investment coordinator for the World Bank and other internationally funded projects aiming at tackling the economic and humanitarian crisis in the Palestinian territories.

== Activism ==
In 2011 Abdu founded and became the chairman of the Euro-Mediterranean Human Rights Monitor.

Abdu was the assistant director and Palestine Office Manager for Council for European Palestinian Relations, and was on the board of trustees of the International platform of NGOs working for Palestine. In 2011 he was the media coordinator for the Freedom Flotilla II. He is a policy analyst with the Al-Shabaka, a Palestinian policy network.

Abdu sponsored the establishment of We Are Not Numbers in early 2015. Conceived by American journalist Pam Bailey and co-founded by journalist Ahmed Alnaouq under the umbrella of the Euro-Mediterranean Human Rights Monitor, the project was launched for young adults in the Gaza Strip and designed both to help them share their narratives (and those of their people) in their own words with the Western (English-speaking) world to counter stereotypes about Palestinians.

== Killing of sister's family by Israeli strikes ==
In March 2025, Israeli air strikes in Gaza killed Abdu's sister alongside her entire family. On X, Abdu reported that the attack claimed the lives of his sister, Nesreen, her husband Mohammed Daoud al-Jamasi, and their three children, Ubaida, Omar, and Layan. He added that Ubaida's wife, Malak, and their children, Siwar and Mohammed, were also killed.

== Published works ==
Abdu has authored or co-authored several publications: a chapter, "The Gaza Strip: Reversing the Desire to Flee" in Escaping the Escape: Toward Solutions for the Humanitarian Migration Crisis, a book published by Bertelsmann Stiftung in 2017, in which he analysed Palestinians’ motives to take deadly risks to attempt to leave the Gaza Strip; "The Effect of the 50-day Conflict in Gaza on Children: A Descriptive Study", published by the Lancet; and "As MENA States Grow Increasingly Repressive, Businesses Should Lead Reform", published by the Journal of Political Risk, in which he analysed businesses' responsibility of challenging repressive policies and human rights violations in the MENA region.

Abdu's published works also appear on University of Oxford Law Faculty's blog Oxford Human Rights Hub, OpenDemocracy, Middle East Eye and Insight Turkey.
