= Qalqilya Zoo =

Zoo in Qalqilya, West Bank, Palestine

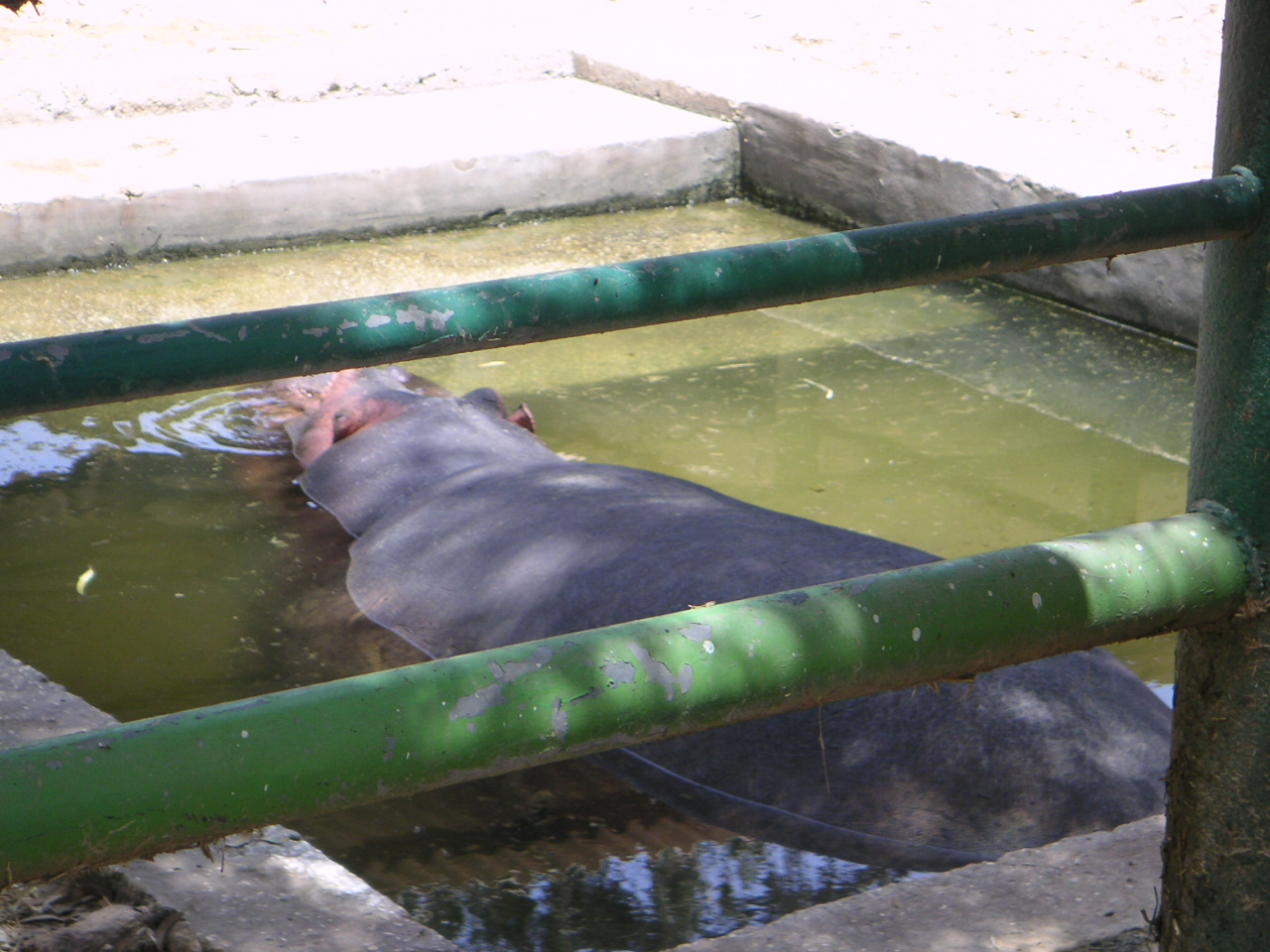
- Interactive map of Qalqilya Zoo
- 32.1953845°N 34.9707511°E
- Date opened: 1986
- Location: Qalqilya, West Bank, Palestine
- Land area: 2 hectares (4.9 acres)
- No. of animals: 170
- Website: http://qnzoo.ps/

Qalqilya Zoo (Arabic: حديقة الحيوانات الوطنية) is a small, 2-hectare (4.9-acre) zoo in the Palestinian city of Qalqilya on the western edge of the West Bank. Established in 1986, it is the only zoo in the State of Palestine. The zoo houses 170 animals, a small natural history museum, a children's entertainment park, and on-site restaurants.

== History ==
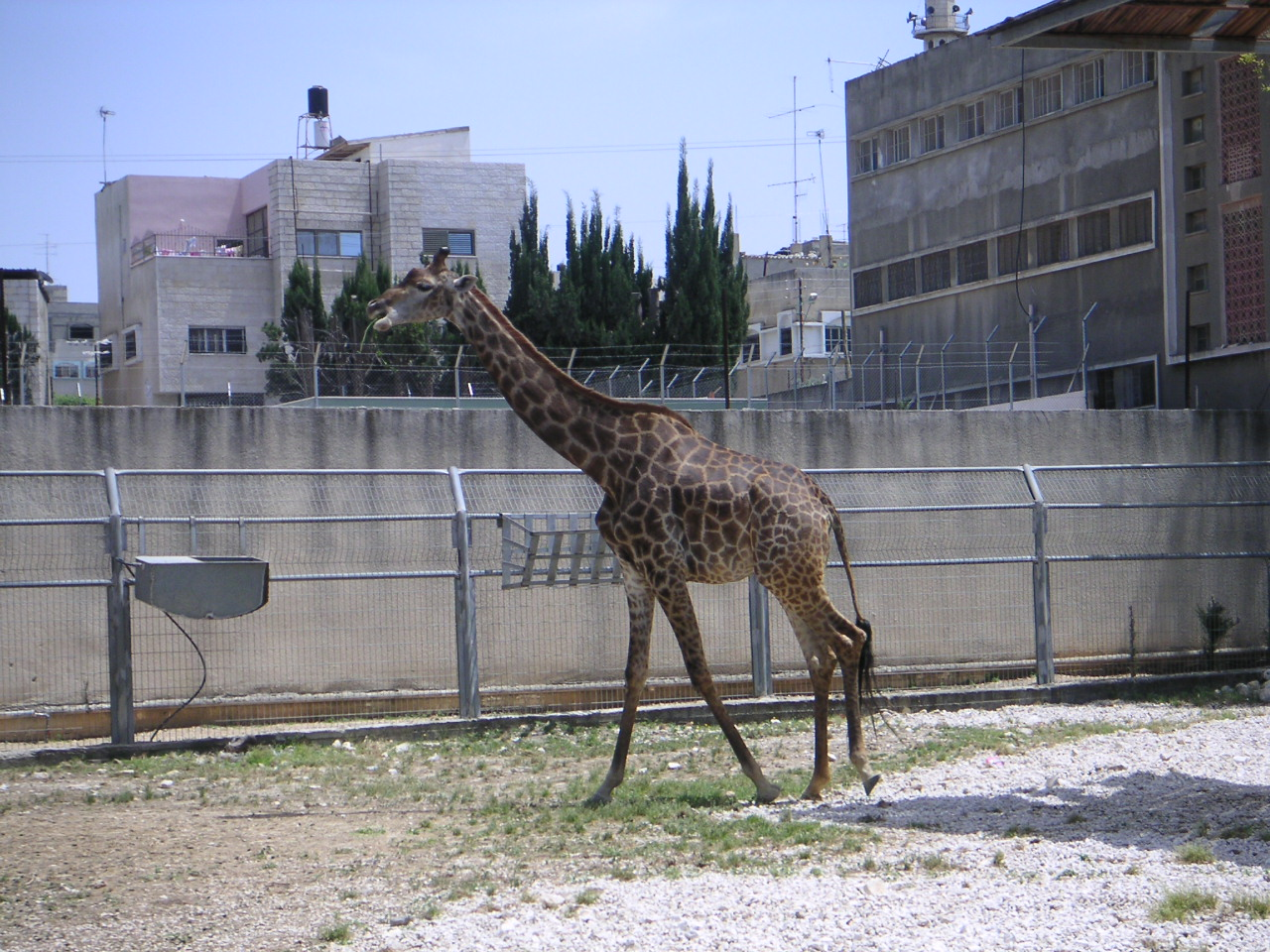
The only male giraffe at Qalqilya Zoo died in 2002, when Israeli soldiers opened fire on the zoo, and its body can now be seen at the zoo's museum

The zoo was the brainchild of the former mayor of Qalqilya. Israeli zoos helped to stock it and it was designed as a symbol of Arab-Israeli cooperation. When it opened in 1986, the zoo was considered a "jewel in the crown of Palestinian national institutions." It became a popular attraction and was later expanded to accommodate the increasing flow of visitors, which included both Arabs and Israelis.

After the outbreak of the Second Intifada, visitors from outside Qalqilya were barred entry. In 2003, the Israeli authorities allowed group visits arranged in advance. A child playing outside the main entrance of the zoo on a public holiday was killed by indiscriminate fire, which led to a brief drop in visitors. The zoo's survival has been attributed to the hard work and dedication of its resident veterinarian, Sami Khadr, and his staff.

During the intifada, "Dubi", the zoo's only male giraffe, from South Africa, died after becoming frightened by the sound of gunfire and running into a pole. "Ruti", his pregnant partner, miscarried ten days later. Both animals were taxidermied are on display at the zoo's museum. In 2002, three zebras died after inhaling tear gas used to break up a demonstration at a high school adjacent to the zoo. Dr. Khadr performed the taxidermy himself, including the giraffe "Dubi", his unborn calf, the zebras, as well as a monkey, wildcats and snakes.

Since its inception, an Israeli veterinarian, Motke Levison, has helped out at the zoo, providing phone consultations and meeting with Khadr to deliver emergency medical supplies. Levison has also served as a mediator, helping the zoo acquire new animals. Three lions, three ibex desert goats and two zebras were donated to the zoo by the Ramat Gan Safari park in September 2004. The lions were meant to be transferred to Qalqilya in 2000, but the outbreak of the Second Intifada delayed the delivery. Saeed Daoud, director of the Qalqilya Zoo, named the three lions Jafer, Jaras and Naboko, "the kings of peace." According to Khadr, the Ramat Gan zoo also sent him monkeys, an ostrich, and raccoons.

== Zoo grounds ==
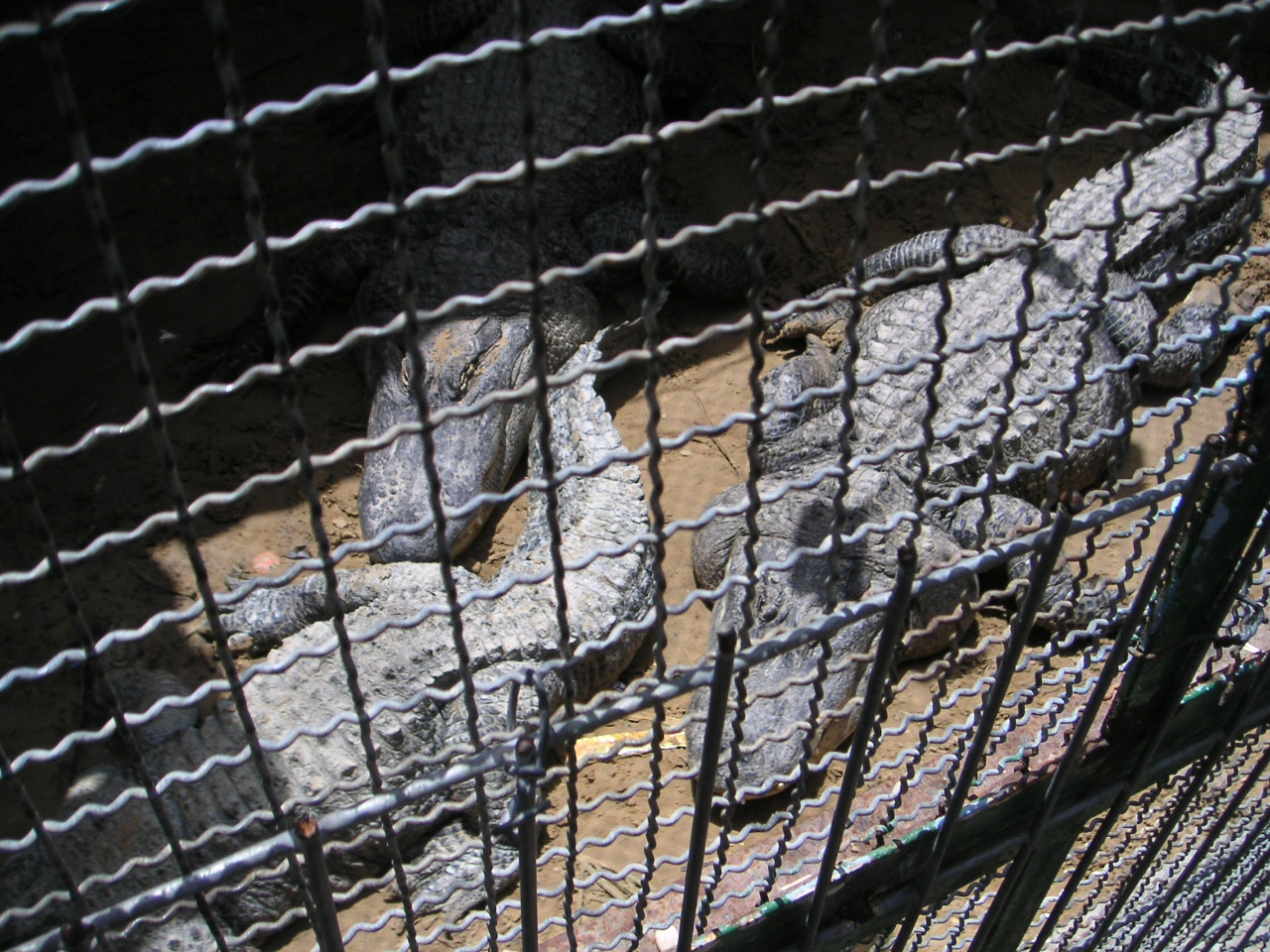
Alligators, 2006

The zoo houses lions, brown bears, crocodiles, ostriches, camels, deer, gazelles, zebras, birds, lizards, snakes, and monkeys of various types. There is also a hippopotamus named Dubi, who shares his small concrete wading pool with a family of peacocks. In December 2003, The Guardian described Qalqilya Zoo as "one of the West Bank's more pleasant surprises [...] there is a small but beautiful landscaped park. [...] And amid the trees, in spacious, clean enclosures, a lioness, an ostrich, a family of bears, a pool full of crocodiles." The animals are provided ample room to move around, with some enclosures as big as those in the London Zoo.

The zoo can be reached by taking a service taxi from the city center. The zoo also has a children's entertainment park, part of which is inside what used to be a swimming pool.

== Museum ==
After their deaths, animals from the zoo have been taxidermied by the resident veterinarian, Dr. Sami Khadr, who is also a self-taught taxidermist. School children are frequent visitors to the zoo's "colorful, highly eccentric Natural History Museum." Almost 100 exotic animals are displayed inside.

== See also ==
- Gaza Zoo
