= 2004 Palopo cafe bombing =

Terrorist incident in Indonesia

- Location: Palopo, South Sulawesi, Indonesia
- Date: 10 January 2004; 10:30 pm (UTC+8)
- Target: Sampoddo Indah Cafe
- Attack type: Improvised explosive device
- Deaths: 4
- Injuries: 3
- Perpetrators: Jasmin bin Kasau and three others.

A cafe was bombed on 10 January 2004 in Palopo, South Sulawesi, Indonesia. Occurring at 10:30 p.m. local time (UTC+8), an improvised explosive device beneath table number 11 in the Sampoddo Indah karaoke cafe. The blast killed four people and injured three others. Four men, including Jasmin bin Kasau, were arrested for the bombings. Bin Kasau was sentenced to 20 years imprisonment but later escaped.

== The attack ==
Witnesses reported that two men spent two weekends scouting the Sampoddo Indah Cafe located 4 kilometres (2.5 mi) from downtown Palopo on the road to Makassar, staying for a short period of time then leaving. On 10 January 2004, they returned and sat at table No. 11, located near the entrance, and ordered drinks, which they left unfinished. A device, thought to have been remotely detonated, exploded at 10:30 p.m. local time (UTC+8), from underneath that table.

The blast killed four people and injured three others. Three of the deceased, later identified as Abdul Rahman, Ambo, and Sumarni, 39, were residents of Palopo, while another, Suratman, was from another city. The explosion was heard up to 2 kilometres (1.2 mi) away. Most of the cafe's clients escaped through the back door prior to the arrival of the police.

== Investigation ==
Two men were identified by the police after questioning 17 witnesses on the next day, with preliminary sketches. Eighteen days later, police arrested four suspects and charged them with the bombing. Another 10 suspects were sought, and police expressed that the suspects had participated in a Laskar Jihad-run training camp in Poso Regency, Central Sulawesi, together.

On 1 February 2004, Jasmin bin Kasau was arrested in Noling village, Luwu Regency. He later confessed to the bombing, calling it "part of a jihad against vice in nightclubs and bars." Several pieces of evidence were seized from bin Kasau, including an FN MAG gun, some ammonium nitrate and several pipes. Jasmin, along with three accomplices, was sentenced to 20 years imprisonment. However, he later escaped from Gunungsari Penitentiary, Makassar, in 2007.

== See also ==
- List of terrorist incidents, 2004
- Terrorism in Indonesia
