= We Are Not Numbers =

English writing program for Palestinian youths

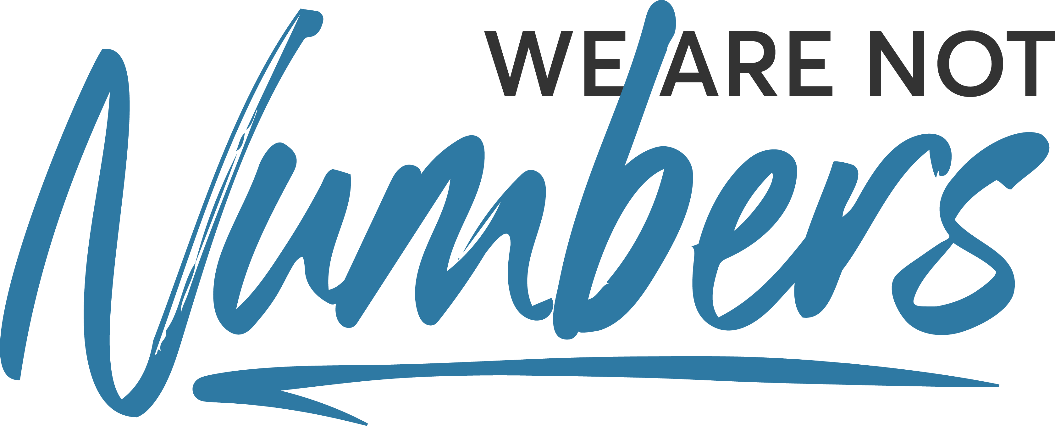
- Abbreviation: WANN
- Established: February 2015
- Purpose: Telling the stories of victims in conflict areas
- Official language: English
- Parent organization: Euro-Med Monitor
- Funding: Donation
- Website: Official Website

We Are Not Numbers (WANN) is a project established in 2015 by Euro-Mediterranean Human Rights Monitor to provide English-language writing workshops for young Palestinians in Gaza. It provides each participant with six months of training and mentoring with experienced English writers, professional authors, reporters and communicators. The features, stories, news reports and social media content produced as part of the program have been featured by various media outlets, among them HuffPost, Mondoweiss, The New Arab, Palestine Chronicle and +972 Magazine.

== History ==
WANN was launched in February 2015 to provide mentorship for young writers from Gaza on English-language content creation. The project originated in the personal mentorship by Euro-Med Monitor's Pam Bailey of a depressed Gazan youth, identified as Ahmed Alnaouq, who had lost a brother and close friends in an Israeli airstrike. Bailey encouraged Alnaouq to write about his experiences, which he did. The receptivity of international outlets for the resulting article became a "turning point" for Alnaouq that led him to found WANN together with Bailey. Writer and professor Refaat Alareer was one of the organization's founders.

== Activities ==
The program provides each participant with six months' training with native English-speaking mentors, and began in 2015 with around 40 young people from Gaza writing on an English-language blog while receiving mentoring from experienced authors and journalists. The aim was to open a window to "the people behind the numbers in the news". Within a few months of launching, it had raised over $8,200 using the crowdfunding platform Indiegogo. Mentors including Ali Abunimah, Susan Abulhawa, Ramzy Baroud, and Laila El-Haddad.

A year later, Mondoweiss reported, the project had grown to involve more than 75 writers from Gaza, and mentors included Miko Peled, Alice Rothchild, and Ben Norton.

"Days of Palestine" reported that Bailey was denied entry to Israel in August 2016, despite having a permit to enter Gaza, due to her "illegal" work. She said that an Israeli lawyer suggested she had been added to a blacklist of Palestinian and international NGOs involved with human rights advocacy.

In 2019, a collection of works from the project was published in German as the book We Are Not Numbers: Young Voices from Gaza (German: We Are Not Numbers: Junge Stimmen aus Gaza). The following year, WANN launched a Hebrew-language website called We Beyond the Fence to provide Israelis with access Palestinian articles, poems and personal essays about life in Gaza.

In 2021, WANN was involved with 30 NGOs and other organizations, and had at that point mentored 300 young Palestinian writers. WANN had also expanded into providing virtual online tours of Gazan cities, sponsoring talks by Palestinian intellectuals and activists, and providing mental health support to its writers. In 2023, the program accepted its 17th cohort of prospective writers.

== Content and aims ==
WANN is a platform to encourage creativity and writing among the youth in Gaza by having them share their stories and experiences.

WANN distinguishes itself by encouraging its writers to focus on the everyday lives and challenges of people rather than the narratives of war and conflict that dominate mainstream news cycles. While some WANN stories are political, the primary aim of the stories is to shed a personal light on the conflict, blockade, poverty and despair that define the lives of the writers. They also explore themes of hope, resilience, and the power of storytelling as a means of resistance.

Despite living under difficult circumstances, the writers find solace in their Palestinian identity and use writing as a way to challenge stereotypes and misconceptions about Gaza. The project has gained attention from international readers and media, amplifying the voices and experiences of young Gazans beyond their borders.

In contrast to the political calls to armed resistance in Gaza, WANN's writers draw inspiration from non-violent advocates such as Martin Luther King Jr., Nelson Mandela and Mahatma Gandhi.

== Sources ==
- Katz, Y. (2022). (Re)imagining Peace: Exploring Mediatized Everyday Peace in Israel/Palestine. University of Michigan (Thesis). doi:10.7302/6102.
- Charlie, J. S. (2015). "Palestine Unbound". Journal of Palestine Studies. 44 (3): 104–113. doi:10.1525/jps.2015.44.3.104.
- Hesse, I. (2017). "Sensory siege: Dromocolonisation, slow violence, and poetic realism in the twenty-first century short story from Gaza". Journal for Cultural Research. 21 (2): 190–203. doi:10.1080/14797585.2016.1272786. S2CID 152264721.
