= 2004 Karbala and Najaf bombings =

Car bombings in Iraq

- Part of Iraqi insurgency (2003–2006) in Iraqi insurgency (2003–2011)
- Location: Najaf and Karbala, Iraq
- Date: 19 December 2004 (UTC+3)
- Target: Funeral procession, Imam Ali Mosque
- Attack type: Suicide car bombings
- Deaths: 66
- Injuries: 191
- Perpetrators: Unknown, denied by Al-Qaeda in Iraq
- Motive: Anti-Shi'ism

The 2004 Karbala and Najaf bombings were car bombings that tore through a funeral procession in Najaf and through the main bus station in nearby Karbala—two Shia holy cities – on 19 December 2004. 66 people were killed and 191 wounded.

== Perpetrators ==
Abu Musab al-Zarqawi's group Tanzim Qaidat al-Jihad fi Bilad al-Rafidayn ('al-Qaeda in Iraq') said that the group was not responsible for these attacks.
