= 2004 Multan bombing =

Terrorist incident in Pakistan

- Part of Insurgency in Khyber Pakhtunkhwa
- Location: Multan District, Punjab, Pakistan
- Date: October 7, 2004
- Target: Mourners
- Attack type: Car bombing
- Weapon: Car bomb
- Deaths: 40
- Injuries: Nearly 100

The 2004 Multan bombing was a car bombing that took place in Multan, Punjab, Pakistan on October 7, 2004. The death toll was reported at 41 with nearly 100 people injured.

== Day of the attack ==
Top leaders of the banned outfit Sipah-e-Sahaba Pakistan along with Ahl-i-Sunnat-Wal Jamaat had organized a meeting to mourn the death of Amjad Hussain Farooqi. The meeting began on 10:30 pm on Wednesday after Isha prayers, and continued till 4:15 am on Thursday morning. The bomb blast took place as the people were leaving the meeting venue at Rashidabad neighbourhood.

== Incident ==
Ahl-i-Sunnat-Wal Jamaat had gathered a crowd of 2000 for a meeting when the attack happened around 4:30 am. The bomb, according to Interior Minister Aftab Khan Sherpao was remote-controlled and was placed inside of a Suzuki car. Eyewitnesses reported that they heard two blasts with a 20-second interval. Besides killing innocent civilians the bomb also damaged some nearby buildings and left puddles of blood and human flesh scattered around. Two minutes after the first explosion, another blast went off. According to reports, this bomb was attached to a motorcycle.

== Aftermath ==
After the attack, the police were deployed to the site amid attacks from protestors who burned tires, damaged vehicles, and attacked two ambulances. The blast left a one and half foot crater at ground zero. After the blast most of shops in the area closed down and people started gathering to protest. Some of them pelleted passing vehicles with stones and chanted slogans against the government for failure to provide security to the citizens.

Following the attack, he government temporarily banned all gatherings except Friday prayers. The United States put out a statement condemning the attack.

Later on the police arrested Irfan Ali Shah who was eventually found guilty on 40 counts of terrorism for masterminding the double bombing and was sentenced to death in 2006.
