= Mia Bloom =

Academic

Mia M. Bloom is a Canadian academic, author, and Professor of Communication at Georgia State University. She was formerly an associate Professor of International Studies at the Pennsylvania State University in University Park and a fellow at the International Center for the Study of Terrorism at Penn State.

Bloom received a PhD in political science from Columbia University, a Master's in Arab Studies from Georgetown University and a Bachelor's from McGill University in Russian, Islamic studies and Middle East Studies. Her studies specialize in ethnic conflict, rape in war, child soldiers, female terrorists, and terrorist communications. Bloom was a term member of the Council on Foreign Relations in 2003–2008. Bloom has also taught and researched at numerous universities. (Note: Universities included Princeton, Cornell, Harvard, McGill, University of Georgia, University of Cincinnati, Brooklyn College, Hunter College, Yeshiva University, Baruch College, Stern College, and Rutgers University.) She has appeared on CNN, PBS Newshour, MSNBC, and Fox News.

== Books ==
- Dying to Kill: The Allure of Suicide Terror (Columbia University Press, 2005)
- Living Together After Ethnic Killing: Exploring the Chaim Kaufman Argument (edited with Roy Licklider, Routledge, 2007)
- Bombshell: Women and Terror (University of Pennsylvania Press, 2011)
- Bloom, Mia; Horgan, John (2019). Small Arms: Children and Terrorism. Cornell University Press. ISBN 978-1-5017-1206-7. JSTOR 10.7591/j.ctvfc55rt.
