= Light in Gaza =

2022 book

- Author: Jehad Abusalim, Jennifer Bing, and Michael Merryman-Lotze (editors)
- Publisher: Haymarket Books
- Publication date: August 2022
- Pages: 280
- ISBN: 9781642597257

Light in Gaza: Writings Born of Fire is a 2022 book edited by Jehad Abusalim, Michael Merryman-Lotze and Jennifer Bing. It contains poems and prose about Gaza made by Palestinian writers from before the Nakba and up to the 21st-century.
