= Gaza Zoo =

Zoo in Gaza City, Gaza Strip, Palestine

- Interactive map of Gaza Zoo
- 31.480309°N 34.445372°E
- Date opened: 2010
- Date closed: 2016
- Location: Gaza City, Gaza Strip, Palestine

The Gaza Zoo (Arabic: حديقة حيوان غزة) was a leisure complex, series of public gardens, children's amusement park and zoo in the Gaza Strip created by the government of Gaza in the spring of 2010 on government property that was formerly a garbage dump. It closed in 2016.

There also is or was a small private zoo, known as Marah Land Zoo located off Salahadin Street (also spelt "Salah Al Deen") in the Gaza City district of Zeitoun. The zoo's animals, like the local people, have suffered as a result of the difficulties in Gaza and the zoo has featured often in reports by the international media. The zoos were badly damaged during the Gaza wars of 2008–2009 and 2023.

== Animals ==
The zoo's stock, in addition to the two lions has included several eagles, some doves, some foxes, Egyptian mongoose, some cats, dogs, ponies, wolves, geese, tortoises, lizards, cattle, pigs, zebras, boars, goats, ducks, red-eared sliders, turtles, deer, monkeys, chickens, pheasants, peacocks and a camel.

One of the zoo's two lions, Sabrina, which like the other animals in the zoo, got into Gaza by being smuggled through a tunnel from Egypt, was stolen in 2005 and remained missing until being rescued by Hamas militants who found her during a raid on a drug ring.

One of the most widely reported stories in the international media involved the painting of donkeys to resemble zebras. Nidal Barghout explained that "due to more than two years of the tight Israeli siege on Gaza and the closure of the border crossings, I was unable to import zebras from Africa to our zoo. Then, an idea came to my mind: bring two domestic ordinary white donkeys, paint them black and white.... It is hard to smuggle a real zebra from Egypt to Gaza, firstly, it is too heavy, and secondly, it costs around $50,000 to buy a zebra from Africa and bring it to the border area and smuggle it in ... however, I thought having a zebra in my zoo is very important for the children to see all kinds of jungle and desert wild animals, then the idea occurred to me."

== Cafe facilities ==
The zoo also had, in a small olive grove, a small cafe and some picnic tables.

== See also ==
- Qalqilya Zoo
