= Euro-Mediterranean Human Rights Monitor =

Non-profit human rights organization

- Founded: November 2011; 14 years ago
- Founder: Ramy Abdu
- Type: Non-profit; INGO
- Headquarters: Geneva, Switzerland
- Location: MENA
- Services: Protecting human rights
- Fields: Legal advocacy, media attention, direct-appeal campaigns, research, lobbying
- Chairman: Ramy Abdu
- Board chair: Richard Falk
- Website: euromedmonitor.org

Euro-Mediterranean Human Rights Monitor (commonly known as Euro-Med Monitor, EMHRM and sometimes as Euro-Med HRM) is a nonprofit organization for the protection of human rights.

== Foundation and leadership ==
Euro-Mediterranean Human Rights Monitor was founded by Ramy Abdu in November 2011 in Geneva, where it maintains its headquarters.

Ramy Abdu, the founder of Euro-Mediterranean Human Rights Monitor, serves as its chairman.

Richard A. Falk, the former United Nations Special Rapporteur on the situation of human rights in the Palestinian territories, serves as Chairman of its Board of Trustees. Board members are human rights professionals from academia, law, and international activism, including Christine Chinkin, Noura Erakat, Celso Amorim, Lisa Hajjar, Tareq Ismael, John V. Whitbeck, and Tanya Cariina Newbury-Smith.

Euro-Mediterranean Human Rights Monitor has applied for consultative status, but action on the application has been postponed several times due to queries from Libya, Bahrain, and Israel.

== Objectives ==
According to the organisation, its main objective is to raise awareness about human rights law in Europe and the Mediterranean-North Africa area and to influence the international community to take action against human rights violators.

== Projects ==
=== Women's Leadership Incubator (2017–2019) ===
Women's Leadership Incubator (2017–2019) project was funded by the Swedish Kvinna Till Kvinna organization and aimed to empower women in the Gaza Strip to defend their rights and create their own sources of income. The project was based on funding and training local non-governmental organizations staff through capacity-building programs to support women and enhance their social and economic participation.

In September 2022, Euro-Mediterranean Human Rights Monitor reviewed the case of Farah Maraqa, one of seven Arab employees of Deutsche Welle fired in February for allegedly anti-semitic social media posts; Euro-Mediterranean Human Rights Monitor found that her statements had been taken out of context.

=== We Are Not Numbers (2015–present) ===
We Are Not Numbers is a project launched by Euro-Mediterranean Human Rights Monitor international secretary Pam Bailey and Ramy Abdu in February 2015 to provide workshops for young writers from Gaza on writing English-language articles and stories, as well as producing English-language content material for social media, in order to reach Western audiences. The programme provides each participant with six months' training with native English-speaking mentors, and began with around 40 young people from Gaza writing on an English-language blog while receiving mentoring from experienced authors and journalists. The aim was to open a window to "the people behind the numbers in the news".

In August 2016, Bailey was denied entry to Israel, despite having a permit to enter Gaza, on account of her 'illegal' work. A lawyer suggested she had been added to a blacklist of Palestinian and international NGOs involved with human rights advocacy.

In 2019, a collection of works from the project was published in German as the book We Are Not Numbers: Young Voices from Gaza (German: We Are Not Numbers: Junge Stimmen aus Gaza).

WANN also launched a Hebrew-language website called We Beyond the Fence in 2020 to provide Israelis with access to Palestinian articles, poems, and personal essays about life in Gaza. As of 2021, WANN was involved with 30 NGOs and other organizations, and in 2023, the programme accepted its 17th cohort of prospective Palestinian writers.

=== WikiRights (2015–present) ===
According to Euro-Mediterranean Human Rights Monitor, there was a "dominance of the official government-issued narrative" in Wikipedia articles and "an almost complete absence of the narrative of victims of violations in different regions". Since 2015, Euro-Mediterranean Human Rights Monitor has been training college students and recent graduates in conflict zones to make improvements to Wikipedia articles with the victim narratives from different conflict areas. The training includes workshops on techniques and evidence to modify Wikipedia articles written in Arabic and English. Project beneficiaries are informed of Wikipedia's standards and policies to safeguard appropriate use of the encyclopedia. Euro-Mediterranean Human Rights Monitor had analyzed Wikipedia's human rights content during armed conflicts in the MENA region and found the content to be weak. Director of WikiRights Anas Aljerjawi stated, "The WikiRights project believes in the value and urgency of promoting and documenting the narrative of the victims and keeping it present."

== Publications ==
Euro-Mediterranean Human Rights Monitor regularly publishes reports on many different topics relating to the human rights situation in Europe and MENA, including,

=== Summary executions ===
OHCHR stated on 20 December 2023 that according to witness accounts circulated by media sources and Euro-Mediterranean Human Rights Monitor, Israeli soldiers summarily killed eleven unarmed men in Rimal. Subsequently in January 2024, Al Jazeera reported that the number of deaths was 19. Euro-Mediterranean Human Rights Monitor told Al Jazeera they believe there is a pattern of "systematic" killing, that "In at least 13 of field executions, we corroborated that it was arbitrary on the part of the Israeli forces." On 26 December, 2023, Euro-Mediterranean Human Rights Monitor submitted a file to the International Criminal Court and United Nations special rapporteurs documenting dozens of cases of field executions carried out by Israeli forces and calling for an investigation.

=== Migrants and refugees ===
In September 2021, Euro-Mediterranean Human Rights Monitor and ImpACT International documented widespread state-sponsored violations of human rights against African migrant workers in the UAE. The two organizations released a report based on about 100 interviews with migrant workers from African countries who confirmed that the authorities carried out a massive campaign of arrests against about 800 African workers in the country.

In January 2021, Euro-Mediterranean Human Rights Monitor released a report indicating that the Frontex was involved in illegal pushbacks of migrants and asylum seekers in the Mediterranean.

In December 2020, Euro-Mediterranean Human Rights Monitor released a study in cooperation with the York University to address the risks that refugees with disabilities in Turkey face, including lack of adequate care and social services.

In December 2017, Euro-Mediterranean Human Rights Monitor and Amsterdam International Law Clinic issued a report on the legal position of ‘Stateless Persons’ in the EU, shedding light on the EU's laws concerning stateless persons.

In September 2014, Euro-Mediterranean Human Rights Monitor revealed information about the fate of hundreds of migrants after their ship wrecked in the Mediterranean.

=== Arbitrary detention ===
In April 2021, a group of 22 influential academics signed a Euro-Mediterranean Human Rights Monitor petition demanding that the government of Saudi Arabia release former minister Abdulaziz Al-Dakhil.

In July 2020, Euro-Mediterranean Human Rights Monitor released a report on Jordanian government measures against teachers, including arresting teachers’ syndicate leaders and shutting down the syndicate.

In March, 2021, Euro-Mediterranean Human Rights Monitor sent a letter to UK authorities signed by 15 UK MPs and peers to highlight the case of Michael Smith who is detained in Dubai. The Independent quoted Tanya Newbury-Smith, a Euro-Mediterranean Human Rights Monitor trustee, as saying: "There has been strong backlash against Dubai over its detention and treatment of Princess Latifa, and her case is one of many."

=== Treatment of civilians during armed conflict ===
On May 24, 2022, Euro-Mediterranean Human Rights Monitor and UN Women Palestine organized an art exhibition, titled "I am 22, I lost 22 people," showing paintings made by a survivor of an Israeli airstrike on Gaza during the Israeli military attack on the Strip in May 2021. The survivor, Zainab Al-Qolaq, displayed the suffering she had experienced from the moment her house was bombed and her 12-hour stay under the rubble until she found out that she had lost 22 members of her family, in addition to the internal struggles she has been facing since that time.

Euro-Mediterranean Human Rights Monitor and UN Women Palestine released a booklet that gathered al-Qolaq's paintings and texts describing the psychological impact of the incident and presenting information about the targeting of the al-Qolaq family house.
