= Hanan (given name) =

Ḥanan (חנן) is a name of Biblical Hebrew origin (cf. Philistine Hanun) which is also found in Qur'anic Arabic. In Hebrew, it is a masculine name meaning "gracious", "gracious gift" or "grace". In Arabic where it is used as a feminine name, it means "compassion" or "affection".

The name John is speculated to derive, via Latin and Greek, from the Hebrew name Yehoḥanan or Yoḥanan meaning "Yahweh is gracious".

The word 'ḥanan' is exclusively mentioned in the Qur'an while describing Prophet Yahya (John the Baptist) in Surah Maryam 19:12-13. The name Ḥanan is mentioned many times in the bible.

Notable people with this name include:

- Hanan ben Hanan, Herodian-era High Priest of Israel in Jerusalem
- Hanan of Iskiya, rector of the Talmudical academy at Pumbedita
- Hanan the Egyptian, 2nd century tannaic sage
- Hanan bar Rava, 3rd century amoraic sage
- Hanan Mohamed Abdelrahman, mathematician
- Hanan Saeed Mohsen al-Fatlawi (born 1 July 1968), Iraqi politician
- Hanan al-Shaykh (born 1945), Lebanese author
- Hanan Ashrawi, Palestinian legislator, activist, and scholar
- Hanan Eshel, Israeli archaeologist
- Hanan Ibrahim, Somali activist
- Hanan Jacoby (born 1962), American economist
- Hanan Kattan, Jordanian-born, British-based film producer of Palestinian origin
- Hanan Keren (born 1952), Israeli basketball player
- Hanan Maman (born 1989), Israeli footballer
- Hanan Melcer, Israeli judge
- Hanan Porat, Israeli rabbi, educator, and politician
- Hanan Tarik (born 1994), Ethiopian film and television actress and model
- Hanan Tork, Egyptian actress

== See also ==
- Hanan (surname)
- Hanani (name)
- Hanania
- Hanin
- Ian
