= Hananiah =

Hananiah, Hanina, Chaninah, Haninah, Chananiah (Hebrew: חנינא, חנניה) or Ananias (Koinē Greek: Ἀνανίας) may refer to:

== Hebrew Bible ==
- Hananiah ben Zerubbabel, (Old Testament: Chronicles)
- Hananiah of Shadrach, Meshach, and Abednego
- Hananiah (Samaritan), 4th century BC, governor of Samaria under the Achaemenid Empire
- Hananiah ben Azzur, a false prophet mentioned in Jeremiah 28

== Rabbis ==
- Hanina Segan ha-Kohanim first generation Tanna
- Hanina, third generation Amora the Land of Israel
- Hanina bar Hama (d. 250)
- Haninah, or Chaninah, 2nd century AD Rabbinic sage, contemporary of Judah ben Bathyra and Jonathan
- Hanina ben Hakinai, 2nd century AD Rabbinic sage, contemporary of Ben 'Azzai and Simon the Temanite
- Haninah ben Teradion, 2nd century AD Rabbinic sage, contemporary of Eleazar ben Perata I and Halafta
- Hanina of Sura 5th generation Amora
- Hanina of Sepphoris

== Hellenistic ==
- Ananias ben Onias, son of the priest who founded the Jewish Temple at Leontopolis
- Hananiah of Damascus, known as Ananias of Damascus, Hellenized Jewish mystic, mentioned in the Acts of the Apostles as a convert to Christianity and early companion of Saul of Tarsus

== Modern era ==
A personal name, including:

- Hananiah Harari (1912–2000), American painter and illustrator
- Hanania Baer (born 1943), award-winning cinematographer
- Hananya Naftali (born 1995), Israeli journalist

== See also ==
- Ananiah
- Hanani
- Hanania
- Hanan (given name)
- Hanan (surname)
