= Hanan =

Hanan may refer to:

== People ==
- Hanan (given name)
- Hanan (surname)
- Hanan (wrestler) (born 2004), Japanese professional wrestler
- Hanan the Egyptian (fl. 2nd century), rabbi in Alexandria and Judaea
- Hanan of Iskiya (fl. 6th/7th century), rector of the Talmudical academy at Pumbedita

== Other uses ==
- Hanan International Airport, Niue
- Hanan, a 2004 film directed by Makarand Deshpande

== See also ==
- Hamam (disambiguation)
- Haman (disambiguation)
- Baal-hanan
- Hannan (disambiguation)
