= Lashon Hakodesh =

Jewish term attributed to the Hebrew language

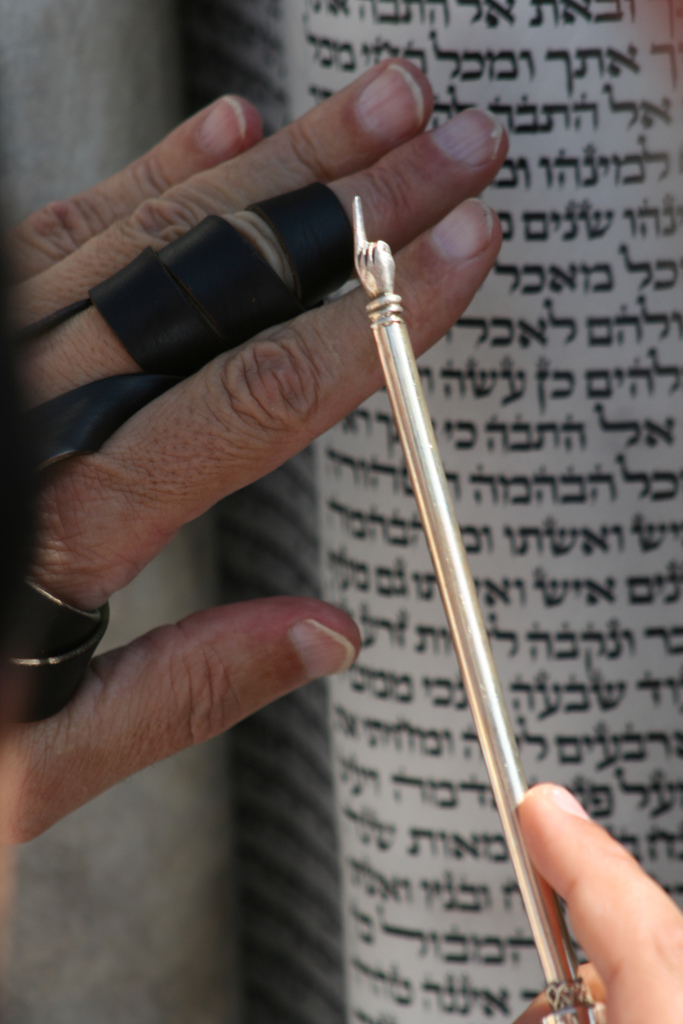
Parshat Noah in Lashon Hakodesh (לשון הקודש) on Torah scroll.

Lashon Hakodesh (Hebrew: לָשׁוֹן הַקֹּדֶשׁ; lit. "the tongue [of] holiness" or "the Holy Tongue"), also spelled L'shon Hakodesh or Leshon Hakodesh (Hebrew: לְשׁוֹן הַקֹּדֶשׁ), is a Jewish term and appellation attributed to the Hebrew language, or sometimes to a mix of Hebrew and Aramaic, in which its religious texts and prayers were written, and served, during the Medieval Hebrew era, for religious and judicial purposes, sacred liturgy and Halakha – in contrary to the secular tongue, which served for the common or routine daily needs, such as the Yiddish or Ladino languages.

== Origins in the classical texts ==
The phrase's first appearance is already in the Mishnah:

"The following may be recited in any language: The Torah-portion of 'Sotah', the confession made at the presentation of the tithe, the 'Shema', and the 'Prayer' …

The following are recited in the Holy Tongue: The declaration made at the 'First Fruits', the formula of 'Halizah', the blessings and curses, the benediction of the priests …"

— Mishnah, Tractate Tractate Sotah 7:1-2 (Talmud, Sotah 32a)

In its narrow sense, Lashon Hakodesh refers not to the Hebrew language in its entirety, but rather to the Biblical Hebrew only. In its broader sense, it was used for combining Hebrew and Talmudic-Aramaic within the Rabbinic Hebrew, which served the purpose of writing the Jewish classical texts of the Middle Ages and the Early modern period.

The exact meaning of the phrase "Lashon Hakodesh" becomes clear due to its contrary term. In the Mishnah and the Gemara the term was aimed to take out the foreign languages that were commonly spoken among the Jewish communities:

"For Rabbi said: Why use the Syrian language in the land of Israel? Either use the Holy Tongue or Greek! And R. Joseph said: Why use the Syrian language in Babylon? Either use the Holy Tongue or Persian!"

— Talmud, Tractate Sotah, 49b

"Rabbi Hanina said: Because language [of Babylonia] is akin to the Lashon Hakodesh"

— Talmud Tractate Pesachim, 87b

Some of the Rishonim sages perceived only Biblical Hebrew, and not the Mishnaic Hebrew, as "Lashon Hakodesh". The Ibn Ezra took an expansive view of Lashon HaKodesh, considering it to include not only Biblical Hebrew but also Aramaic and Arabic. In Yiddish, the term "Loshn Koydesh" serves to describe its own Hebrew-Aramaic component, as opposed to words originating from German or Slavic languages. In some Jewish Haredi denominations, the term is meant to describe old Hebrew as opposed to Modern Israeli Hebrew, and a few extreme Haredi denominations even try to avoid using renewed words since the Revival of the Hebrew language.

Jewish philosophers have offered various reasonings for Hebrew being the "Sacred Language".

Maimonides, in his book The Guide for the Perplexed (written in a Judeo-Arabic language), reasoned that the preference of the Hebrew language is based upon its internal characteristics:

"I have also a reason and cause for calling our language the holy language—do not think it is exaggeration or error on my part, it is perfectly correct—the Hebrew language has no special name for the organ of generation in females or in males, nor for the act of generation itself, nor for semen, nor for secretion. The Hebrew has no original expressions for these things, and only describes them in figurative language and by way of hints, as if to indicate thereby that these things should not be mentioned, and should therefore have no names; we ought to be silent about them, and when we are compelled to mention them, we must manage to employ for that purpose some suitable expressions, although these are generally used in a different sense."

— The Guide for the Perplexed

Nahmanides disagrees with Maimonides' reasoning, and provides his own reasoning, based on the way the Hebrew was being used:

"As I see it, the reason for the Rabbis calling the language of the Torah the Holy Tongue is that the words of the Torah and of the prophecies and all sacred utterances were all spoken in that language; it is the language that the Holy One, blessed be He, speaks with His prophets and with His people, saying, "I am ...," "Thou shalt not have ..." and the remaining commandments and prophecies; it is the language by which He is called in His sacred names... and in which He created His universe, gave names to heaven and earth and all therein, giving his angels and his host names — Michael, Gabriel, etc. — all in that language, and in that language naming the saintly people in the Land, such as Abraham, Isaac, and Solomon."

— Nahmanides' interpretation of Exodus, 30:13

== See also ==
- Biblical Hebrew
- Mishnaic Hebrew
- Lotegorisch
- Sacred language
