= Paul Glewwe =

American economist

Paul W. Glewwe
- Born: 4 April 1958 (age 68)

Academic background
- Education: Stanford University
- Doctoral advisor: John Pencavel
- Website: www.apec.umn.edu/people/paul-glewwe; Information at IDEAS / RePEc

Paul William Glewwe (born April 4, 1958) is an economist and Professor of Applied Economics at the University of Minnesota. His research interests include economic development and growth, the economics of the public sector, and poverty and welfare. He formerly was the Director of the Center for International Food and Agricultural Policy and served as co-chair of the education programme of the Abdul Latif Jameel Poverty Action Lab (J-PAL).

== Biography ==
Paul Glewwe earned a B.A. in economics from the University of Chicago in 1979 as well as a Ph.D. from Stanford University in 1985, the latter with a doctoral thesis analysing labour markets and the distribution of income in Sri Lanka. Already prior to graduation, Glewwe began working as a consultant for the World Bank (1984–85, 86-88), followed by appointments as economist in the World Bank's population and human resources department (1988–93) and as senior economist in its policy research department (1994–99). In parallel, Glewwe worked in various academic positions at Pennsylvania State University, George Washington University and Oxford University. Since 1999, he has worked in the Department of Applied Economics of the University of Minnesota, first as assistant professor (1999-2001), then as associate professor (2001–06), and finally as full professor (since 2006). Moreover, since 2013, Paul Glewwe has held the title of Distinguished McKnight University Professor. In terms of professional service, Glewwe has served on the editorial boards of the World Bank Economic Review (2009-2016), Journal of the Asia Pacific Economy (2008-2019), Journal of African Economies (since 2011), Economics of Education Review (since 2013), and the American Journal of Agricultural Economics (2014-2017). He currently serves as an associate editor of Economic Development and Cultural Change (since 2020). Additionally, he has served as co-chair of the education programme of J-PAL from 2010 to 2014 and as Director of the Center for International Food and Agricultural Policy from 2007 to 2011.

== Research ==
Glewwe's research generally focuses on the economics of education, poverty and inequality in developing countries, and applied econometrics. Overall, Glewwe belongs to the top 2% of most cited economists as ranked by IDEAS/RePEc.

=== Relationship between health and education ===
One of Glewwe's main research areas concerns the relationship between health and education. For example, he (with Hanan Jacoby) finds early childhood malnutrition - and not borrowing constraints or the rationing of school places - to be the likely cause of delayed enrollment in primary school in Ghana, and documents (with Jacoby and Elizabeth M. King) how malnutrition among young children in the Philippines impairs their academic achievements by delaying the age at which they enroll into school and causing them to learn more slowly, though not by decreasing their effort exerted at school (in terms of attendance, homework, etc.). Looking into the link between child health and maternal education, Glewwe argues based on evidence from Morocco that mothers' health knowledge, which is generally correlated with (though not necessarily caused by) their schooling, is probably the main pathway how maternal education achieves its strongly positive impact on child health and nutrition in developing countries, which consequently suggests large public health payoffs to female health education in school.

=== Impact of the quality of the supply of education on learning ===
Since the early 2000s, Glewwe has used randomized controlled trials (RCTs) in order to investigate the impact of the quality of the supply of education, e.g. in terms of school supplies or the quality of teaching, on learning outcomes. For example, Glewwe finds (with Michael Kremer, Sylvie Moulin, and Eric Zitzewitz) that in Kenya neither the provision of textbooks nor of flipcharts was effective in raising average student scores and that generally only the best students were able to take advantages of the improvement in school supplies. This in turn raises the question of whether the emphasis of many developing countries' (strongly centralized) education systems on top-down improvements to the supply of education may be guided rather by elite bias than by a concern for broad increases in students' learning outcomes. In another RCT, Glewwe (with Michael Kremer and Nauman Ilias) finds that rewarding primary school teachers in Kenya based on students' test scores and penalizing them based on their students not attending the exam leads teachers to increase the number of test preparation sessions (but not teacher attendance or homework assignments), which then increases students' test scores and exam participation, but is ineffective in reducing dropout rates. Earlier on, having found school characteristics in Ghana to be highly correlated with student achievement, e.g. via average grade attainment, Glewwe (with Jacoby) had argued that improvements to school quality, such as repairs of classrooms, may be a cost-effective investment into education in Ghana relative to the provision of more teaching materials and better trained teachers. More recently, Glewwe (with Albert Park and Meng Zhao) found that providing eyeglasses to children in primary school in rural China increases their learning, as measured by test scores, in Math, Chinese and Science.

=== Returns to schooling, determinants of household vulnerability, and willingness to pay for education ===
Glewwe's other findings include the following:

- That many pre-1990s estimates of rates of returns to schooling are significantly biased because they fail to account for differences in ability and school quality and, even if accurate, may provide poor guidance to education policy compared to rates of return to investments in school quality;
- That the vulnerability of households in Peru to welfare decreases during macroeconomic shocks decreases in education and access to foreign transfer networks, increases if households are headed by women or have more children, and is hardly mitigated by Peru's social security programme (with Gillette Hall);
- That the willingness to pay for schooling in households in rural Peru is high enough at all income levels to cover the operating costs of new schools in their villages, thus suggesting that increasing school fees to raise revenue for educational improvements in developing countries may be feasible (with Paul Gertler).

=== Views on priorities for education policy in developing countries ===
Finally, taking stock of the literature on the supply of education in developing countries, Glewwe (with Michael Kremer) criticizes that, although school enrollment rates have risen rapidly in the developing world between 1960 and 2000, dropout rates remain high and learning outcomes disappointing, and thus argues that the primary policy question should be which policies most effectively improve learning, with RCTs as the preferred tool to conduct that investigation. More recently, Glewwe has emphasized (with Karthik Muralidharan) that educational spending in developing countries could be much more cost effective, as improvements to pedagogy (e.g. remedial classes for children lagging behind) as well as improvements to school governance and teacher accountability tend to be much more cost effective than mere (yet widespread) increases in "standard" school inputs (e.g. more books); by contrast, interventions aimed at increasing the demand for education by raising students' returns to (or decreasing households' costs of) school enrollment and effort are also generally effective in improving learning outcomes, but vary widely in terms of cost effectiveness.

== Selected publications ==
- Glewwe, P., Park, A., Zhao, M. (2016) A better vision for development: Eyeglasses and academic performance in rural primary schools in China. Journal of Development Economics, 122(1), pp. 170–182.
- Wydick, B., Glewwe, P., Rutledge, L. (2013) Does International Child Sponsorship Work? A Six-Country Study of Impacts on Adult Life Outcomes. Journal of Political Economy, 121(2), pp. 393–436.
- Glewwe, P. (2013). Education Policy in Developing Countries. Chicago: University of Chicago Press;
- Glewwe, P. (2008). Education in developing countries. In: Durlauf, S.N., Blume, L.E. (eds.). The New Palgrave Dictionary of Economics (2nd ed.). London: Palgrave Macmillan.
- Agarwal, N., Glewwe, P., Dollar, D. (2004). Economic Growth, Poverty, and Household Welfare in Vietnam. Washington, D.C.: The World Bank.
- Glewwe, P. (2002). Schools and Skills in Developing Countries: Education Policies and Socioeconomic Outcomes. Journal of Economic Literature, 40(2), pp. 436–482.
- Glewwe, P., Grosh, M. (2000). Designing Household Survey Questionnaires for Developing Countries: Lessons from 15 Years of the Living Standards Development Study. Oxford: Oxford University Press.
- Glewwe, P. (1999). The Economics of School Quality Investments in Developing Countries: An Empirical Study of Ghana. London: MacMillan Press.
- Dollar, D., Glewwe, P., Litvack, J. (1998). Household Welfare and Vietnam's Transition to a Market Economy. Washington, D.C.: The World Bank.
