= Haman (disambiguation) =

Haman is the main antagonist in the Book of Esther and the Jewish holiday of Purim.

Haman may also refer to:

- Haman, a subtribe of the Tangsa, who live in Myanmar
- Haman County, South Korea
  - Haman Station, a railway station
  - Haman Stadium, used mostly for football matches
- Haman Formation, South Korea, a geological formation

== People ==
Haman is a Semitic given name and a surname.

Religious figures:

- Haman (Islam), Pharaoh's minister mentioned in the Quran

People

- Haman Daouda (born 1989), Cameroonian footballer
- Haman Sadjo (born 1984), Cameroonian footballer
- Jacques Haman (born 1994), Cameroonian footballer
- Kató Hámán (1884–1936), Hungarian Esperanto and Communist activist
- Radek Haman (born 1969), Czech ice hockey player

Fictional characters:

- Haman Karn, a main character in anime ZZ Gundam and the manga Char's Deleted Affair: Portrait of a Young Comet

== See also ==
- Hanan, a Semitic name
- Hamann, a German surname
- Hammam, a Turkish bathhouse
