= Al-Ahli Arab Hospital explosion =

2023 deadly explosion in the Gaza Strip

- Part of the Gaza war
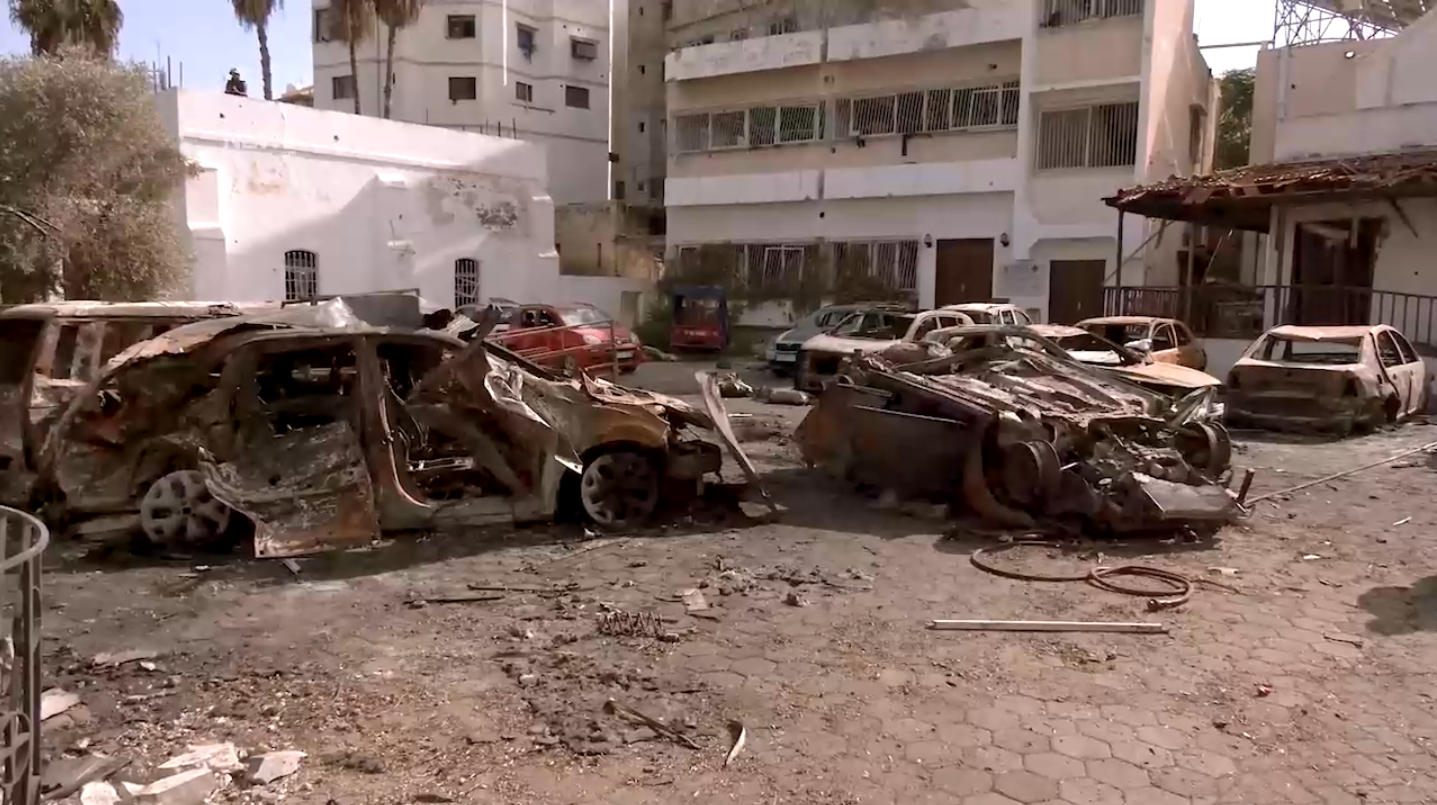
- Aftermath of the explosion in the hospital's courtyard

- Al-Ahli Arab Hospital (the Gaza Strip) Location of the hospital in the Gaza Strip
- Date: 17 October 2023 c. 6:59–7:00 p.m.
- Location: Zeitoun, Gaza, Gaza Strip; 31°30′17.6″N 34°27′41.9″E
- Deaths: 100–300 (United States); ~250 (Al-Shifa Hospital); 471 (Gaza Health Ministry)
- Injuries: 314 (Gaza Health Ministry); ~300 (Al-Shifa Hospital)

On 17 October 2023, an explosion took place in a courtyard of al-Ahli Arab Hospital in Gaza City during the Gaza war, resulting in a large number of displaced Palestinians seeking shelter there being killed or injured.

International media initially reported that over 500 Palestinians were killed according to the Gaza Health Ministry (GHM), but this was a mistranslation of a report that had mentioned over 500 total victims, including injured. The Gaza Health Ministry (GHM) later reported a more precise figure of 471 killed and 342 wounded. A report by Human Rights Watch (HRW) questioned the Health Ministry's casualty figures. The Anglican Diocese of Jerusalem, which manages the hospital, reported 200 people killed, while the U.S. assessed a figure between 100 and 300.

The cause of the explosion is contested. Israel, the United States, France, the United Kingdom, and Canada said that their intelligence sources indicated that the cause of the explosion was a failed rocket launch from within the Gaza Strip by the Palestinian Islamic Jihad (PIJ). Hamas and PIJ stated the explosion was caused by an Israeli airstrike.

In the days after the incident, several organizations concluded that an errant rocket from Gaza was the likeliest explanation, including the Associated Press (AP), CNN, The Economist, The Guardian, and The Wall Street Journal (WSJ). Le Monde and the New York Times (NYT) rejected the Israeli interpretation of Al Jazeera and Hevrat HaHadashot footage cited as evidence of a stray rocket from Gaza hitting the hospital, while noting that other evidence was consistent with that hypothesis and concluding that the cause of the blast remained uncertain. In November 2023, Human Rights Watch (HRW) said that the available evidence made an Israeli airstrike "highly unlikely".

Investigations by Al Jazeera, and research groups Earshot and Forensic Architecture (FA) contested Israeli claims of a misfired Palestinian rocket being responsible for the blast. In its investigation on 20 October 2023, Forensic Architecture concluded that the blast was the result of a munition fired from the direction of Israel. Subsequent investigations by Forensic Architecture published in February and October 2024—the first one tracking, in 3D, each rocket in a volley of Palestinian rockets that Israel accused of striking the hospital, and the latter including situated testimony from Dr. Ghassan Abu-Sitta—were said by the organisation to cast further doubt on the errant rocket launch theory.

== Background ==
=== Al-Ahli Arab Hospital ===
The al-Ahli Arab Hospital is an 80-bed hospital in Gaza City. It was run by the Foreign Mission Board of the Southern Baptist Convention (SBC) between 1954 and 1982, and is still known as the Baptist Hospital (Arabic: المستشفى المعمداني) despite currently being under Anglican management.

The Anglican Archbishop of Jerusalem described the cancer treatment centre as the "Crown Jewel of Ahli Hospital" that had provided cancer diagnoses as a prelude to treatment options at Ahli and other hospitals.

=== Gaza war ===
==== Prior incidents ====
The World Health Organization (WHO) indicated that there were 51 attacks on health facilities in Gaza between 7 and 17 October 2023, killing 15 hospital workers and injuring 27 others.

Before the explosion, there was also a history of Palestinian militant groups firing rockets from within the Gaza Strip that fell short of their target, resulting in property damage and casualties. According to Human Rights Watch (HRW), armed Palestinian groups had unlawfully launched thousands of rockets towards Israel since 7 October. The Israel Defense Forces (IDF) said that in the 11 days preceding the explosion at the al-Ahli Hospital, 450 rockets fired by Palestinian militant organizations landed inside Gaza. The rockets which are fired on Israel by Palestinian groups usually "have only basic guidance capabilities"; Palestinian groups often use Qassam rockets and military-style Grad-type rockets, and both are, in most variants, unguided rocket artillery.

In addition to this, HRW claims that these rockets are prone to misfire, a term which means a rocket does not fire properly or its propellant fails to function properly, or alternatively that its payload does not explode on impact.

Human Rights Watch (HRW) said that Israeli and Palestinian armed groups have both demonstrated a longstanding failure to impartially and credibly investigate violations of international humanitarian law (IHL).

Israel made allegations of the Palestinian Islamic Jihad (PIJ) rocket launches killing Gaza civilians during the August 2022 conflict between Israel and the PIJ. Three munition strikes in Gaza that resulted in a notably high number of child deaths (together these three hits accounted for 12 out 15 child deaths in that conflict so far) were all attributed by Israel to PIJ munitions falling inside Gaza. The Associated Press (AP) examined two sites, of the first strike and of the second strike, both of which took place around the times when the PIJ announced they had just launched a rocket attack; in both places they: "saw none of the telltale signs of an Israeli [F-16 or drone] strike" which "lent support to suspicions they were caused by rockets that went off course". However the Israeli military later took responsibility for the second strike.

Concerning the first strike, the Israeli military published a video "purportedly showing a barrage of militant rockets, with one falling short", similar to initial claims after the al-Ahli explosion.

==== Incident on 14 October 2023 ====
On Saturday 14 October, according to a statement by the Archbishop of Canterbury, Justin Welby, an Israeli rocket had damaged the upper two floors of the hospital's cancer treatment center, which contained the ultrasound and mammography wards, and injured four staff members. The Washington Post, Le Monde, and Human Rights Watch (HRW) reported that the munition on 14 October was likely an illumination shell.

The Washington Post reported that an Anglican pastor working for the diocese had filmed a video of a shell in the hospital's ultrasound room and that the video showed a 155mm artillery illumination shell. The report said:

"[I]llumination rounds are not fired directly at targets and descend on a parachute to signal, illuminate areas or mark targets, while the body of the shell falls from the sky."

An Israeli military spokesman said:

If an artillery round landed there, then it was probably a result of it falling or landing after having been fired, but definitely not targeting the hospital."

Le Monde published an article containing an analysis of a photo shared on social media depicting the damage from 14 October and the remnant of a shell. According to several experts consulted by Le Monde, the photo shows a 155 mm caliber shell. Richard Stevens, of the CAT-UXO collective, a specialist in collating information about explosive devices, told Le Monde that the color of the shell was consistent with an illumination projectile.

The Human Rights Watch (HRW) report published on 26 November 2023 said that the damage resulting from the 14 October incident appeared kinetic and not explosive, and that an illumination flare was visible in social media posts depicting the event.

=== Evacuation orders ===
On Friday 13 October, Israel ordered hospitals and the population of northern Gaza to evacuate to southern Gaza. Because of insufficient beds in the southern Gaza Strip and no means of transporting patients, such as newborns in incubators or patients on ventilators, the evacuation orders were widely regarded as impossible to comply with.

The Anglican Diocese of Jerusalem said the hospital had received at least three evacuation warnings from the Israeli military on Saturday, Sunday, and Monday. Human Rights Watch (HRW) reported that all hospitals in northern Gaza—not just al-Ahli—received general evacuation orders on 13 October and the days after. On Saturday 14 October, the World Health Organization (WHO) issued a statement: "Evacuation orders by Israel to hospitals in northern Gaza are a death sentence for the sick and injured". In his statement on Sunday 15 October 2023 Archbishop of Canterbury, Justin Welby said: "The seriously ill and injured patients at the Anglican-run Ahli Hospital – and other healthcare facilities in northern Gaza – cannot be safely evacuated".

=== Day of the explosion ===
About 1,000 displaced Gazans remained sheltering on hospital grounds from the ongoing Gaza war, in addition to about 600 patients and staff inside hospital buildings, according to Reverend Sewell from the Diocese of Jerusalem. Throughout the day, Hamas published numerous posts on its Telegram channels, providing updates on rocket attacks aimed at Israeli territory. The New York Times later concluded that there appears to have been Israeli bombardment in the area, with two explosions visible near the hospital within two minutes of it being struck.

== Explosion ==
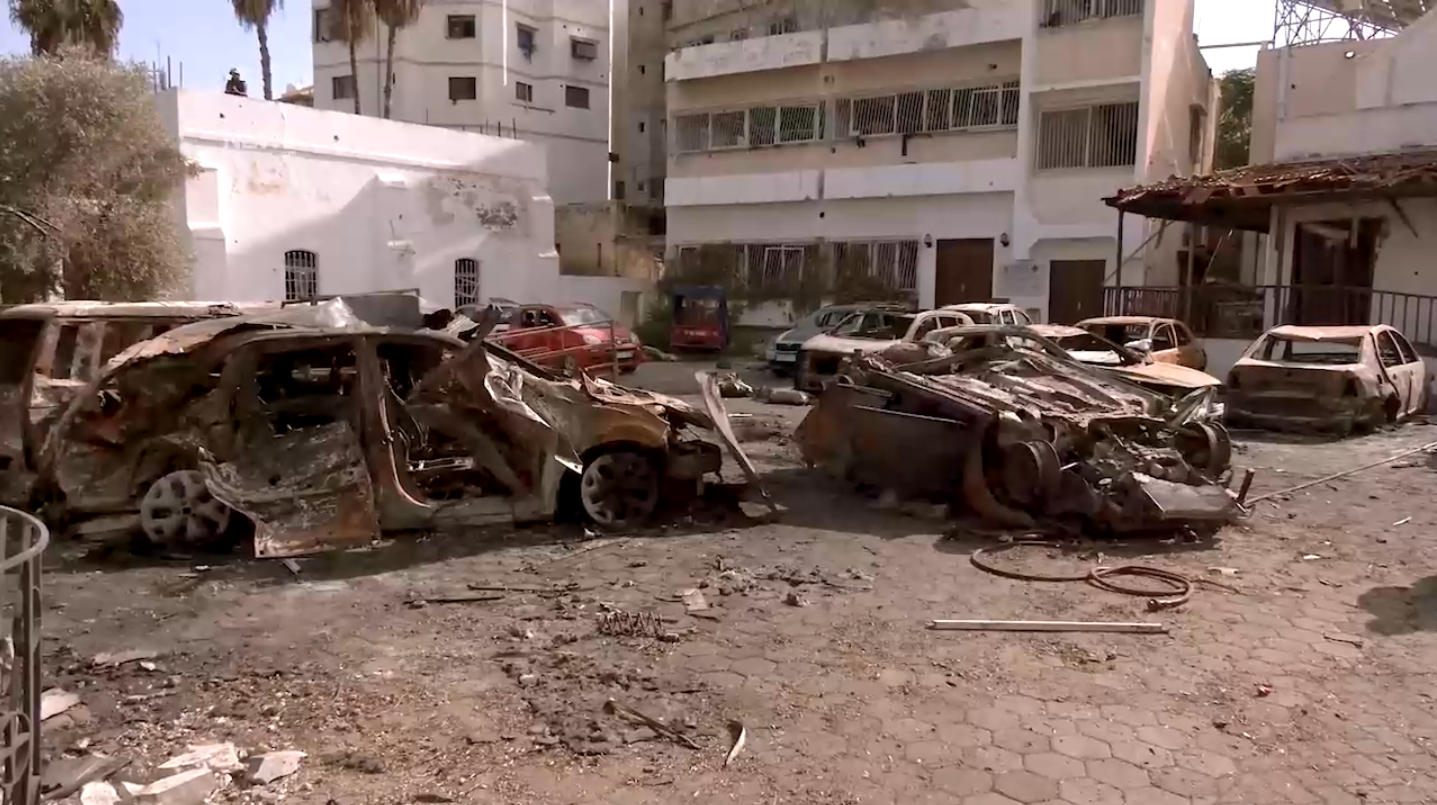
Aftermath of Al-Ahli Arab Hospital explosion

=== Explosion ===
The explosion occurred in a parking lot in the courtyard at 6:59 p.m. local time on Tuesday 17 October, creating orange plumes in the sky.

Multiple videos captured the moment of the blast:

- Al Jazeera did broadcast the explosion live. During the few minutes preceding the al-Ahli explosion, the livestream captured several explosions in the Gaza Strip (at 6:54:28, 6:55:03, 6:57:42, and 6:58:04). A fifth explosion is visible at 6:59:55. Two seconds later, with the hospital complex in full view of the camera, the hospital courtyard is hit by a bright explosion and engulfed by fire.
- A video recorded by a person located close to the hospital shows building walls being suddenly illuminated by the flash of the explosion, then immediately pans to the explosion itself. Immediately before the flash of the explosion, a whooshing sound is heard. According to one description, the first sounds of the explosion are a "whirring noise". Local reports of the explosion were made between 7 p.m. and 7:20 p.m.

A video from Netivot broadcast by the Israeli Channel 12 news station, and initially claimed by some news outlets to depict a Palestinian rocket launch causing the explosion, was later confirmed by The New York Times to depict something else: Palestinian rocket launches, the launch of an Israeli rocket from a position near Nahal Oz (which later blew up mid-air, possibly intercepting a target), and an unrelated explosion on the ground in a different area than the al-Ahli hospital (southeast of it). Le Monde confirmed that this explosion occurred more than 20 seconds before the al-Ahli explosion. This video, and others such as a CCTV video from a suburb of Tel Aviv (showing a wide view of the Gaza Strip) and a CCTV video from Netiv HaAsara by the border wall (showing the same explosion as the Netivot video, not the al-Ahli explosion), were later used by The New York Times and Al Jazeera (separately) to create synchronized video compilations of the events.

Le Monde pointed out the presence of two warplanes over Gaza (which could be tracked because of decoy flares they were leaving behind), in both the Tel Aviv video and the Netivot video, at the time of the explosion; Le Monde did not make the claim that these warplanes were responsible for the blast. The videos also show Palestinian rocket salvos, including one salvo from a location a few kilometers southwest of the hospital, which Le Monde claimed is "compatible" with the hospital explosion (the paths of some rockets in that salvo passed over areas close to the al-Ahli hospital); however, Forensic Architecture disputed the possibility of accidental malfunction, pointing out how every rocket in that salvo can be tracked from the launch until the moment each rocket flamed out; and that all of them exhausted their fuel in flight, and none of them flamed out significantly earlier than the other ones.

Another fragment of the aforementioned Al Jazeera broadcast depicted a rocket exploding (or breaking up) in the air. It occurred when an Israeli rocket, launched from a site near Nahal Oz known to have an Iron Dome installation, exploded mid-air (possibly destroying a target), but the video was sometimes incorrectly claimed to show an accidental malfunction of a Palestinian rocket. This mid-air explosion was initially claimed by news outlets, and by an IDF spokesperson, to be the cause of the al-Ahli explosion; however, this was ruled out by The New York Times based on the location of the mid-air explosion and the time needed for the debris to fall to the ground.

The fire inside the hospital courtyard was filmed from a nearby rooftop.

=== Post-explosion ===
The explosion did not cause significant damage to surrounding buildings. Scorch marks and fire-damaged vehicles, including one vehicle that was flipped over, were observed in the parking lot at the explosion site the following day. Photographs show a crater in a driveway, close to the point where the driveway reaches the parking lot, and the base of the fence on both sides of the driveway had been ripped out; the grassy areas on both sides of the driveway were covered with victims' belongings. A crater at the impact site was described as "fairly shallow". French intelligence assessed the crater to be about 1 m (3.3 ft) long, 75 cm (2.46 ft) across, and 30 cm (0.98 ft) to 40 cm (1.3 ft) deep. According to CNN, the impact crater was approximately 3 ft (91 cm) by 3 ft wide, and 1 ft (30 cm) deep.

Ghassan Abu-Sittah, of Doctors without Borders, said that the ceiling of the operating room collapsed.

The cause of the explosion has not been confirmed. Early efforts to analyse the al-Ahli Arab Hospital explosion were quickly complicated by a variety of claims and counterclaims over who was responsible, as well as the rapid spread of unverified, misleading and false information on social media.

== Casualties ==
The number of persons killed in the explosion has not been independently verified. As of 19 October 2023, the death toll reported by the Hamas-led Gaza Health Ministry (GHM) was 471. The board chair of the American Friends of the Episcopal Diocese of Jerusalem told a local ABC News station that the organization believes approximately 200 people died in the explosion. As of 19 October 2023, U.S. intelligence agencies had assessed that the blast killed 100 to 300 people, and that the actual number was likely on the low end of that range. Human Rights Watch (HRW) said that the numbers put out by the Gaza Health Ministry (GHM), if true, would represent an unusually high death-to-injury ratio (471 killed vs. 342 injured) and would appear out of proportion with the damage observed at the explosion site.

Mohammed Abu Selmia, director of the nearby al-Shifa Hospital, estimated a death toll of 250 and reported that around 350 injured people were brought to his hospital by both ambulances and personal cars. He said the terrible condition of many bodies made it difficult to arrive at a total number of dead.

=== Israel ===
IDF spokesman Rear Admiral Daniel Hagari criticized media outlets for quickly disseminating what he termed as "unverified claims" by Hamas regarding the death toll, saying it was implausible for Hamas to accurately determine the casualty figures so soon after the incident.

=== Hamas ===
Hamas declined to disclose any information about the identity of the deceased to The New York Times.

== Aftermath ==
=== Protests ===
The explosion resulted in massive protests in the West Bank, Iran, Canada, Egypt, Iraq, Jordan, Kuwait, Lebanon, Libya, Morocco, Qatar, Syria, Tunisia, Turkey, the United Kingdom, and Yemen. In Ramallah and other cities in the West Bank, protestors chanted against President Mahmoud Abbas and threw stones, leading to police using tear gas and stun grenades in an attempt to disperse protestors. Thousands of protestors marched outside the Israeli Consulate in Istanbul to protest against the war, and in Jordan, protestors attempted to storm the Israeli embassy. The U.S. and French embassies in Beirut also faced protests aimed at their support for Israel.

=== Political fallout ===
Jordan canceled a quadrilateral summit that had been scheduled to take place between Jordanian King Abdullah II, President of the Palestinian National Authority (PNA) Mahmoud Abbas, Egyptian President Abdel Fattah el-Sisi, and U.S. president Joe Biden, after Abbas withdrew from it in protest of the explosion.

=== News coverage ===
News coverage of the event changed quickly, with conflicting reports from Gazan, Israeli, and American sources. The Guardian initially reported that "the scale of the blast appeared to be outside either of the militant groups' capabilities". BBC correspondent Jon Donnison told BBC News viewers on the evening of the explosion: "It's hard to see what else this could be, really, given the size of the explosion, other than an Israeli air strike, or several air strikes", adding: "When we've seen rockets being fired out of Gaza, we never see explosions of that scale". Days later, BBC's deputy director of news Jonathan Munro said that the corporation had made a mistake in its live coverage, and that Donnison: "was wrong to speculate about the cause of the explosion of the hospital". BBC also issued a clarification and apology on 23 October, writing: "We accept that even in this fast-moving situation it was wrong to speculate in this way about the possible causes and we apologise for this, although he did not at any point report that it was an Israeli strike".

In the immediate aftermath, Hananya Naftali, an aide to Israeli Prime Minister Benjamin Netanyahu, posted a tweet stating:

"Israeli Air Force struck a Hamas terrorist base inside a hospital in Gaza. A multiple number of terrorists are dead. It's heartbreaking that Hamas is launching rockets from hospitals, Mosques, schools, and using civilians as human shields."

He then deleted it after Israel blamed a Palestinian rocket for the explosion. Nicola Perugini and Neve Gordon find the above to be an example of Israelis falsely accusing Palestinians of using human shields.

After the explosion on 17 October, The New York Times' home page prominently featured headlines highlighting the Palestinian claims about an "Israeli Strike" and "At Least 500 Dead", before starting to tone them down and include Israeli counter-claims after about two hours (according to an analysis by Nieman Lab). Several journalists of The New York Times had raised concerns about these headlines internally, but they were overruled. On 23 October 2023, The New York Times published an Editors' Note (which Nieman Lab summarized as "a limited mea culpa") indicating that its early coverage of the event "relied too heavily on claims by Hamas, and did not make clear that those claims could not immediately be verified" and said that: "Times editors should have taken more care with the initial presentation, and been more explicit about what information could be verified".

On 25 October 2023, Le Monde published an explanation stating that they "were not cautious enough" in their initial coverage, which suggested that the Israeli army was responsible for the explosion and was not explicit in disclosing that the health ministry in the Gaza Strip is "administered by Hamas". The explanation said that information could not be verified on the ground because the Israeli army bans access to Gaza, making cautious coverage especially important, and pledged to: "regularly remind [its] readers that some news coming out of the Gaza Strip, in particular casualty figures, cannot be verified" and to clarify Hamas's control over the Gaza Health Ministry (GHM).

== Analyses ==
On 26 October 2023, the BBC said that the analyses since the explosion have focused on three main areas: the absence of any fragments from the munition, the crater and damage caused by the explosion, and images showing "a projectile rising over Gaza". To conduct a full investigation would require independent access to the site, inspection of any physical evidence, and the ability to interview witnesses–none of which has been possible because of the state of the ongoing war.

=== Origin and trajectory of munition ===
On 18 October, the day after the blast, Channel 4 News reported that the trajectory of the missile that appeared on Al Jazeera Live is inconsistent with the missile launching location given by the IDF and further said a contradiction in the IDF's presentation on the missile's purported launching location. On 20 October, Channel 4 News in collaboration with research group earshot also used doppler effect sound analysis of the strike and visual analysis of the crater created by the strike. Both analyses indicated that the object that caused the blast would have come from points "east of the hospital not west as the IDF claimed". Channel 4 also reported that Hamas and Palestinian Islamic Jihad (PIJ) had not backed their claims of Israeli origin with evidence and that "Islamic Jihad claimed to have a missile fragment but have not produced it". Forensic Architecture, in an analysis of footage of the blast site, disputed Israel's account that it was caused by a rocket from Gaza and concluded instead that it resulted from a munition fired from the direction of Israel in the northeast. The New York Times also released a report stating that it was unlikely that the rocket that appeared on Al Jazeera Live was even related to the explosion as it was too far away from the hospital, despite Israeli officials using it as evidence for an errant rocket launched by Palestinian militants.

On 19 October, Al Jazeera published their own analysis of the video recordings, presenting both their own video and the Tel Aviv video. They said that there is no evidence for a Palestinian rocket causing the hospital explosion. The analysis said that the Palestinian rocket volleys and the lone rocket ascending vertically were two different events, shown by the Tel Aviv video to have occurred in two different areas. The vertically launched rocket then exploded mid-air, which was correctly identified by Al Jazeera as an Iron Dome interceptor explosion (however, Al Jazeera erroneously said that the lone rocket launched vertically was Palestinian and was destroyed by the Iron Dome—in fact, it was an Israeli Iron Dome rocket that was launched vertically and then exploded; in another part of the video, decoy flares were mistaken for other Iron Dome interceptions).

On 21 October, the Associated Press (AP) concluded—from analyzing "more than a dozen videos from the moments before, during and after the hospital explosion, as well as satellite imagery and photos"—that a rocket was "fired from within Palestinian territory, and that the hospital explosion was most likely caused when part of that rocket crashed to the ground", while noting the unavailability of definitive proof. AP reported that its preliminary conclusion was supported by experts in open-source intelligence, geolocation, and rocketry: "who all agreed the most likely scenario was a rocket from within Gaza that veered off and came apart seconds before the explosion". The Associated Press (AP) article reads:

"The camera pans to zoom in on a volley of rockets being fired from the ground nearby. One of the rockets appears to veer from the others, away from the distant lights of Israel and back toward a darkened Gaza City, where electricity has largely been cut. The camera follows the light from the rocket's tail as it arches in the sky upwards and toward the left. Suddenly, the rocket seems to fragment, and a piece appears to break off and fall."

The Al Jazeera video, contrary to the way it was initially described by the AP, does not depict any of the rockets in a volley "veering" from the others and then breaking up. Instead, it shows a lone rocket, not part of any volley fired earlier rising and then exploding.

In November, the Associated Press (AP) issued an update to their analysis, saying that the lone rocket visible in the original Al Jazeera video could not have caused the hospital explosion because it was launched, and exploded, away from the hospital. The AP said this was discovered thanks to the Tel Aviv video, which the Associated Press described as a "new video", a piece of evidence that "emerged after AP's story was published".

After posting the update, the AP continued to say that a misfired Palestinian rocket was the most probable cause. The AP said that both U.S. and French intelligence officials support this assessment, and said that there is other supporting evidence, such as the Netiv HaAsara video, which shows a Palestinian rocket volley closely followed by a large explosion. Le Monde, however, had already concluded earlier that the explosion in the Netiv HaAsara video does not show the al-Ahli explosion at all. Other factors cited by AP—sometimes attributed to identified experts—include the fact that Palestinian rockets would fail and fall inside Gaza in the past; the inconsistency of the damage and crater with Israeli air strikes, particularly with the use of "large bombs"; the inconsistency with other weapons such as artillery, mortars, car bombs or suicide vests; and the inability of Palestinians to produce evidence of Israeli munitions at al-Ahli. AP quoted N.R. Jenzen-Jones as saying: "the most likely explanation would be a failed militant rocket that was still full of highly flammable propellent".

On 21 October, CNN had an anonymous American acoustic expert analyze the sound waveform from the incident, and concluded that although the changes in frequency indicated the projectile was in motion, no information could be gleaned regarding the direction of the motion. CNN also reported that the dark scorch marks on the "dark patches on the ground fanning out in a southwesterly direction from the crater", and burnt trees and a knocked-over lamppost behind the crater, were consistent with a rocket approaching from the southwest. CNN said that, if the projectile were an artillery munition, this could indicate a trajectory from the northeast, but the direction on impact would be inconclusive if the projectile malfunctioned and broke apart in the air. Markus Schiller, a missile expert who has provided analyses for NATO and the European Union (EU), told CNN that he believed a malfunctioning rocket "fell apart mid-air" and crashed into the car park. He also said it was not possible for him to confirm it with the "usual analysis drawing on altitude, flight path and the burn time" because it is not possible to predict the flight path and behavior of a malfunctioning rocket.

A further video analysis conducted by The Wall Street Journal (WSJ) on 21 October suggested that a long-range rocket was launched from Gaza in a northeastern direction toward Israel before veering west towards the hospital. It also concluded that the impact crater was consistent with an impact from the east. This analysis included the Netiv HaAsara video which, on 25 October, Le Monde reported did not show the al-Ahli explosion at all.

Three days later, a The New York Times (NYT) analysis concluded that what The Wall Street Journal (WSJ) described as a "malfunctioning" long-range rocket fired from Gaza was, in fact, a rocket fired from an Israeli position near Nahal Oz; according to The New York Times, it exploded far from the hospital, over the border, and as such it could not have been connected to the hospital explosion. According to their analysis, some 25 seconds elapsed between the firing of the last Palestinian rocket towards Israel and the explosion at the hospital. The NYT said the Al Jazeera footage—cited by the IDF as depicting a rocket aimed at Israel that exploded close to the time of the al-Ahli Arab Hospital blast—instead showed an unrelated rocket fired from an Israeli position near Nahal Oz that exploded on the border some two miles from the hospital. The NYT analysis said that while responsibility for the hospital blast is unknown, and Israeli and American assessments that a failed Palestinian rocket launch might have been to blame remained plausible, its analysis: "cast doubt on one of the most-publicized pieces of evidence that Israeli officials have used to make their case and complicates the straightforward narrative they have put forth".

In addition, the videos analyzed by the NYT showed two things: firstly, that militants were firing rockets, 17 of them in the last salvo, from a position a few kilometers southwest of the hospital, so a failed rocket falling well short of its target with unspent fuel might have caused the fiery explosion (however, the videos show each of those rockets having a similar burn time; Forensic Architecture, besides showing the trajectory of each rocket, said it is unlikely there was any unspent fuel: they said the fact that each rocket traveled a similar distance during the burn time, and achieved a similar speed, and then went dark, indicates each rocket used up all its fuel); and secondly, that there appears to have been Israeli bombardment in the area, with two explosions visible near the hospital within two minutes of it being struck. Israeli forces told the NYT that they had not been striking "within a range that endangered the hospital", but did not indicate how close the nearest strike had been.

The Washington Post (WP) published a similar analysis on 26 October 2023, which also concluded that the projectile shown in the videos is not the same projectile that caused the explosion at the hospital. Instead, The Washington Post concluded that the projectile seen in the videos appeared to be an Israeli missile intercepting a rocket over Israeli territory about three miles from the hospital. Le Monde's analysis on 3 November 2023 also concluded that the projectile shown in the Al Jazeera broadcast was probably unrelated to the explosion at the hospital, noting that the projectile shown appeared to have exploded at such an altitude and distance from the hospital that it was unlikely that debris could have reached the hospital in the time between the projectile exploding midair and the explosion at the hospital, which was about seven seconds.

In a 26 November report, Human Rights Watch (HRW) reached the same conclusion as The New York Times, The Washington Post, and Le Monde, namely, that the projectile shown in the Al Jazeera live stream video appears to be an Iron Dome missile intercepting a rocket over Israeli territory at a location that is too far away from the hospital to have caused the explosion.

In February 2024 the research group Forensic Architecture based at Goldsmiths, University of London analyzed footage of the rocket salvo from Gaza and concluded that unspent fuel from it was an unlikely cause of the blast, as video showed that all 17 rockets in the salvo stopped flaring mid-flight, after each of them traveled a similar distance (1.8–2 km) and achieved a similar speed (500–630 m/s); after consulting an anonymous aerospace expert with a specialism in rockets and missiles, they said this is most consistent with the rockets finishing burning all of their propellant in flight. Forensic Architecture also presented the exact trajectory each of the rockets had.

Using 3D trajectory analysis, Forensic Architecture contradicted the Israeli military's account as presented by military spokesperson Lt. Col. Peter Lerner, who had claimed that a mid-air explosion shown on Al Jazeera captured a misfired rocket responsible for the blast at al-Ahli. Forensic Architecture said it disputed the Israeli military's claims that:

- Footage of a mid-air explosion before the blast shows the misfired Palestinian rocket that allegedly struck al-Ahli: According to Forensic Architecture's analysis, this footage in fact showed an exploding Israeli interceptor.
- Most of the damage to the hospital and its courtyard was caused by unspent rocket propellant from a misfired rocket in the salvo: Forensic Architecture's analysis of open source footage suggested instead that all seventeen of the rockets in question had finished burning their propellant while in flight.

=== Rocket vs airstrike ===
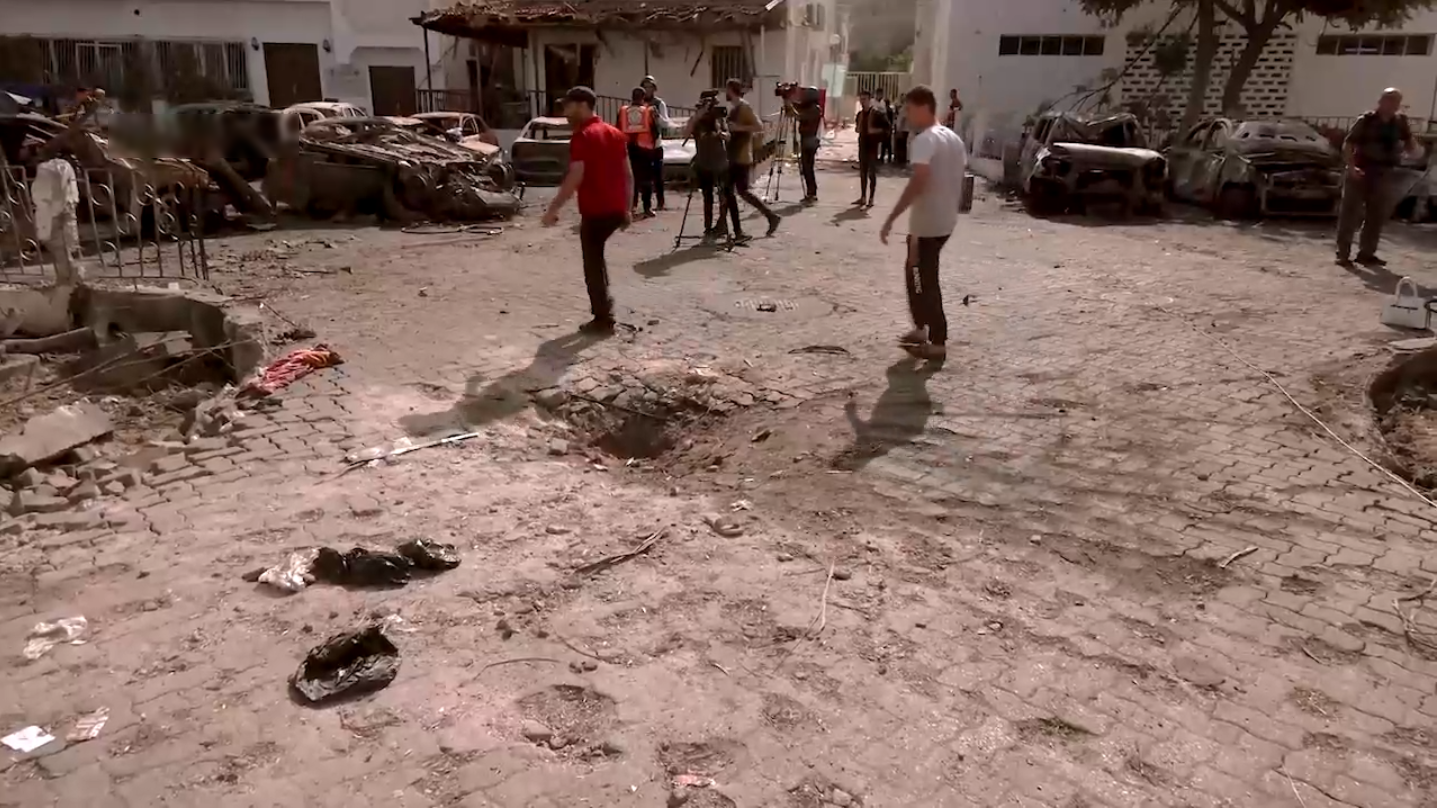
An impact crater after the strike

The Washington Post consulted over two dozen munitions experts, all of whom agreed that the impact of the explosion was inconsistent with an airstrike (which would have caused greater destruction), or an artillery strike (which would have left substantial fragments and probably not caused the massive fireball seen in videos). BBC Verify spoke to a number of experts to establish whether publicly available evidence could establish the cause of the explosion. Some experts said they could not form a view on what occurred, while three experts (Note: J. Andres Gannon at Vanderbilt University, Justin Bronk at Royal United Services Institute, and Valeria Scuto of the risk assessment firm Sibylline) said that the evidence was inconsistent with an Israeli airstrike or warhead damage, and that evidence was consistent with an explosion caused by rocket fuel. Security experts said that the preliminary evidence suggests that a Palestinian rocket fired inside Gaza caused the explosion.

Justin Bronk at Royal United Services Institute (RUSI) said that, while not conclusive: "a rocket failure causing an explosion and fuel fire" was a more likely explanation than an Israeli airstrike. Independent open-source intelligence (OSINT) groups and analysts interviewed by The Daily Telegraph, including Evan Hill, an OSINT investigator for The Washington Post, as well as The Independent, agreed. The Wall Street Journal reported that analysts who examined publicly available images said the explosion site did not: "bear the hallmarks of a strike with a bomb or missile of the types used by Israel" and that the: "damage appeared more consistent with a fireball from a rocket".

The Guardian quoted Marc Garlasco as saying that the crater at the blast site required kinetic energy inconsistent with a Joint Direct Attack Munition (JDAM) aerial bomb, and was also inconsistent with an airstrike, concluding that it was "more likely to be a weapon that failed and released its payload over a wide area". In an interview with PBS, Garlasco also referred to an unusual amount of fire damage, pointing to a long period of burn which, according to him, is also inconsistent with the way standard military munitions work. Bellingcat said that one of the images the IDF spokesman used to demonstrate there was no crater did in fact show what appeared to be a crater, and also quoted Garlasco's analysis. Bellingcat requested comment, and the next day IDF spokesman Jonathan Conricus said that the size of the crater and the damage caused were too small for the munitions used by the IDF: "Scroll through pictures of rockets that impacted in Sderot, Ashkelon, in Be'er-Sheva, you'll see very similar sites", he said. "A small crater, lots of soot and fire remarks and you can see that all of the buildings around are generally intact." NR Jenzen-Jones, a director at Armament Research Services (ARES), also told the BBC that the crater observed at the hospital was significantly smaller than what would typically result from a 155 mm artillery projectile. On the other hand, Mark Cancian of the Centre for Strategic and International Studies (CSIS) said that he was unable to conclude from the available evidence whether the crater may have been caused by an artillery shell, a mortar, or a rocket.

Human Rights Watch (HRW) determined that the sound audible in the video recorded by a bystander was consistent with a motor-propelled munition, such as a rocket or missile, and inconsistent with an artillery shell. Additionally, Human Rights Watch (HRW) said that the impact crater lacked any indication that the projectile was spin-stabilized, as would be an artillery shell launched at an angle of less than 45 degrees. Two researchers from the Australian Strategic Policy Institute (ASPI) said that the blast radius and lack of structural damage on the surrounding cars were inconsistent with a typical Israeli airstrike.

The Associated Press (AP) noted the absence of any large crater of the sort that would be expected if the explosion were caused by an Israeli airstrike. Although Israel does have smaller munitions in its arsenal, the AP said that: "there has been no public evidence of such missile strikes in the area around the al-Ahli Arab Hospital on Tuesday night". AP reported that David Shank, a retired U.S. Army colonel with expertise in military rockets and missiles, explained that the large explosion and subsequent fire was likely caused by the fact that the rocket was still full of propellant. An analysis by the AP on 21 October, including video evidence and satellite imagery, as well as expert opinion, assessed that a rocket was fired from Gaza, and that: "the hospital explosion was most likely caused when part of that rocket crashed to the ground", though the lack of physical evidence makes definitive proof unlikely if not impossible.

In November, AP issued a correction noting that the "key" video of a rocket fired from Gaza and then breaking up could no longer be used to support its earlier assessment: it depicted a rocket fired from Israel. The AP nonetheless stood by its assessment. AP referred to experts having determined, based on three videos, that the rockets launched by the Palestinians before the explosion were launched "on a trajectory that would have taken them in the direction of the hospital seconds before the explosion". The AP then referred to the Netiv HaAsara video of a rocket volley followed by a large explosion—which Le Monde had already concluded was not the al-Ahli explosion but happened over 20 seconds earlier, and in a different place, than the al-Ahli explosion.

Der Spiegel reported that the opinion of Fabian Hoffman, a weapons researcher at the University of Oslo, is that the most likely explanation regarding the cause of the explosion is that a rocket fell apart in several phases and hit the hospital. According to Der Spiegel, Hoffman could not say for sure what caused the rocket's failure, but he suspected that the engine overheated, causing the rocket to fall to the ground.

Agence France-Presse (AFP) published an article on 20 October 2023, reporting on interviews of several analysts, who "remained cautious, preferring not to rule out any scenario". Heloise Fayet, a researcher at the French Institute of International Relations, said that it was difficult to link the minor damage observed at the hospital with the large explosion seen on video. Based on the nature and extent of the damages, Fayet concluded that the most likely scenario was that a rocket hit the gas tanks of several cars. The same AFP article quoted Joseph Henrotin, editor-in-chief of the journal Defense and International Security (DSI), as saying that the visible damage was "consistent with the hypothesis of engine pieces, for example, of a rocket, which fall in a ballistic alignment, projecting debris, flaming materials, and creating a blast effect", at the same time noting that the absence of any structural damage to the building, the impact site being in the parking lot, and the size of the craters were all inconsistent with "the ammunition and targeting capabilities available to the Israelis". Similarly, Xavier Tytelman, an air defense consultant who also works for the magazine Air & Cosmos, said that the grade of munitions used by Israel, which frequently destroy entire buildings with a single strike, "would have done infinitely more damage" than that seen in the hospital parking lot, noting that the images of the scene were not comparable to the effects of laser-equipped JDAM bombs. Tytelman also suggested the rocket in question was likely an Iranian-designed Badr-3 and that its trajectory change was caused by faulty detachment of the first stage. The analysts interviewed by AFP said that they could not completely rule out the scenario of a micro munition fired from an Israeli drone, at the same time observing that they were not aware of any evidence to support it. Specialists consulted by Le Monde also said that the small explosion could be consistent with some missiles in Israel's arsenal, usually launched from helicopters or drones.

CNN's investigative report from 21 October 2023 suggests that a rocket launched from Gaza malfunctioned mid-air, causing the explosion. Experts consulted found the damage inconsistent with an Israeli airstrike. Missile expert Markus Schiller hypothesized that the rocket broke apart mid-air and ignited fuel at the hospital's car park, causing the explosion. Both Cedric Leighton, former National Security Agency of US deputy director, and Chad Ohlandt, a senior engineer at RAND Corporation, concurred. Analysis of mobile phone-captured audio also did not align with a high-grade military explosion. The experts noted a smaller impact crater and lack of wide destruction, undermining the possibility of an aircraft bomb. Patrick Senft from ARES and an unnamed explosives specialist emphasized that the damage was more likely caused by the rocket's fuel and shrapnel, rather than an artillery shell. All cautioned that definitive conclusions could not be made due to various limitations. In a follow-up report on 2 November 2023, CNN concluded that while a "previous version of this story had drawn a [...] conclusion, that the video seemed to capture an errant rocket likely fired from Gaza", it was now known to have been an Israeli rocket that had no connection to the explosion. CNN reiterated that "[u]ntil an independent investigation is allowed on the ground and evidence is collected from the site, the prospect of determining who was behind the blast is remote".

The Wall Street Journal published a report on 21 October 2023, claiming to contain an analysis of four geolocated and verified videos of the incident, which concluded that the explosion was caused by a misfired rocket. According to Le Monde, one of these videos depicted a completely different explosion, and its synchronization with the other videos was deemed incorrect. The New York Times said The Wall Street Journal's analysis mislabeled a rocket fired from Israel as a Palestinian one, and that particular rocket turned out to be unrelated to the hospital explosion.

Channel 4 News said that the explosion site contained only small craters, that buildings surrounding the explosion site were only superficially damaged (and did not structurally collapse), and some of the windows of a nearby church were undamaged—all facts that made it unlikely that the cause of the explosion was a ground-detonating Israeli missile strike, without ruling out the possibility of an air-burst explosion. Channel 4 also observed that although Palestinian Islamic Jihad had indicated they had recovered a warhead, they have not produced it.

India Today's OSINT Team analyzed the footage and images of the explosion and the aftermath, as well as comparing the explosion site to previous aerial bombings by Israel. On 18 October, India Today reported that the visual evidence does not match previous aerial bombings by Israel but that a more detailed investigation would be needed for a conclusive verdict.

Le Monde's analysis on 3 November 2023 showed that several rockets were launched from at least two sites within Gaza toward Sderot before the explosion, with the New York Times placing the firing of the last rocket about 25 seconds before the al-Ahli explosion, and the paths traveled by the rockets from one of those sites passed in close proximity to the al-Ahli Arab Hospital. A rocket launched from this site would have had to travel at a velocity of at least 100 meters per second to reach the hospital in the relevant timeframe. Le Monde said that a rocket with a range of approximately 15 kilometers would be required to reach Sderot from Gaza, and the velocity of such rockets exceeds the required 100 meters per second. Based on these data points, Le Monde concluded that "one of the rockets fired during this salvo could therefore have caused the explosion, but there is no evidence to prove this".

Numerous other news outlets reported on similar opinions from experts they spoke with—all agreeing that the cause of the explosion was more likely a misfired rocket than an Israeli airstrike. According to NPR, as of 19 October 2023, the majority of independent researchers conclude that the damage is not consistent with a standard Israeli air strike. Human Rights Watch found that "the sound preceding the explosion, the fireball that accompanied it, the size of the resulting crater, the type of splatter adjoining it, and the type and pattern of fragmentation visible around the crater are all consistent with the impact of a rocket" and that this was consistent with the type of rockets that Palestinian armed groups use.

In its February 2024 investigation, Forensic Architecture said that "Multiple news outlets cited Israeli military spokesperson Daniel Hagari's claim that it was a Palestinian rocket that struck al-Ahli hospital with 'most of this damage... done due to the propellant, not just the warhead'. Similar claims were made by Human Rights Watch, the Washington Post, the BBC, and AP." However, FA's analysis "suggests that all seventeen visible rockets in the salvo the Israeli military claimed was responsible had finished burning their fuel mid-flight, meaning that by Hagari's own logic they could not have caused the damage to al-Ahli." Forensic Architecture further said that while what happened at al-Ahli remains inconclusive, the Israeli military "launched an aggressive disinformation campaign" in its aftermath, and that it "has yet to provide any conclusive visual evidence to support the claim that the source of the deadly blast at al-Ahli hospital was a Hamas or PIJ rocket". According to The New Yorker, the investigation showed that the IDF "had fostered an environment of uncertainty by putting out misinformation about a misfired Palestinian rocket."

==== Wounds suggesting a fragmentation or DIME bomb ====
In October 2024, Forensic Architecture published another report that employed methods such as situated testimony, photogrammetry, and 3D reconstruction. The report utilized geolocated video evidence from survivors, including Dr. Ghassan Abu-Sittah and journalists, to create a digital model of the hospital and conduct a spatial analysis of the explosion's impact. Abu-Sittah, who was present in the hospital during the impact, provided firsthand accounts of the scene and the nature of the injuries he treated. He recalled that the wounds were clean, characterized by sharp cuts and amputations, suggesting the use of a fragmentation bomb. "You can tell the difference between an IED and a missile by looking at the wound," he said. "You can also distinguish between a fragmentation bomb and a regular bomb." Abu-Sittah further said that most of the injuries he observed after the explosion were caused by munition fragments rather than burns, challenging the assertion made by Israeli military spokesperson Daniel Hagari that the explosion was caused by a Palestinian rocket that failed to ignite its propellant in the air but instead ignited on impact.

On November 17, 2024, Dr. Ang Swee Chai said that the wounds were consistent with dense inert metal explosives (DIME), a type of explosive known for causing high casualties within a small blast radius while doing minimal damage to surroundings.

=== Iron Dome ===
After the explosion, there was speculation on social media that Israel's Iron Dome air defense system could have played a role in causing the event. Der Spiegel relayed the analysis of weapons expert Fabian Hoffman, of the University of Oslo, who said that the Iron Dome is not designed to intercept rockets during their ascent. Similarly, the Associated Press (AP) cited to the opinion of John Erath, senior policy director at the Center for Arms Control and an expert on missile defense, who also relayed that the Iron Dome is designed to intercept rockets during their downward path into Israeli territory—not while they are in an upward trajectory—though Erath conceded that it is not technically impossible for Iron Dome to destroy a rocket during its ascent. Retired U.S. Army colonel David Shank, an expert in missiles, concurred with this view, telling the Associated Press (AP) that the air defense system is generally not engaged unless a rocket has a high probability of causing casualties or damage within Israel, and would not likely be used to destroy a rocket flying over Gaza. Experts consulted by CNN found no evidence that the Iron Dome intercepted the projectile that caused the explosion.

Al Jazeera published an analysis of the hospital explosion on 19 October. Al Jazeera said they had constructed a second-by-second timeline by analyzing video footage of the event. According to Al Jazeera, a rocket launched from Gaza was intercepted by an Iron Dome interceptor and "completely destroyed" in mid-air five seconds before the hospital explosion. As no more rocket launches could be seen in video footage from Gaza from this time until the hospital explosion, Al Jazeera said that they found "no grounds" for the IDF assertion that the hospital explosion was caused by a failed rocket launch from Gaza. The investigation also identified "four Israeli air strikes on Gaza, targeting the area near the hospital" in the minutes before the explosion. Uzi Rubin, the founder and first director of the Israel Missile Defense Organization, told the BBC that the video footage is not consistent with an Iron Dome interception, which causes "an almost immediate sympathetic explosion of the hostile rocket warhead" as opposed to the "elongated glowing debris cloud that fades out after a couple of seconds" seen in the video. By contrast, Marc Garlasco said he did believe the video was consistent with an Iron Dome interception.

The New York Times also determined that the mid-air explosion was caused by a rocket fired from Israel. It said that, based on their analysis of three videos, the launch point of the rocket was within the Israeli territory, and is a known Iron Dome site. It also determined that this Israeli rocket exploded mid-air over the Gaza-Israel border (indeed the missile seen in the video may not have crossed over into Gazan territory) and was not the cause of the al-Ahli explosion, which happened in a different area. The NYT analysis does not state outright whether that Israeli rocket intercepted another rocket—a Palestinian one—while exploding mid-air.

=== Death toll ===
The death toll asserted by the Gaza Health Ministry (GHM) was not independently verified as of 18 October. The Wall Street Journal reported that open-source intelligence analyst Blake Spendley estimated the death toll at 50, based on his review of videos and photos of the scene. Several analysts cast doubt on the death toll figure from the Gazan Health Ministry, citing the limited shock-wave damage and the small size of the open area. On 19 October, Agence France-Presse (AFP) cited an unnamed senior European intelligence official who said he believed the death toll was no more than 50. A video geolocated by Bellingcat showed "[a]t least two dozen bodies" in a grassy area near the explosion.

The New York Times, after reviewing video footage and witness accounts, said on 18 October that there were "scores" of bodies in the hospital's courtyard and the number of casualties was "high".

The general director of Gaza's al-Shifa Hospital, which took in victims of the blast, estimated the death toll at 250. Journalist David Zweig reported that widely reported claims in Western media that a GHM spokesperson claimed 500 had been killed appear to have originated from a mistranslation of an Al Jazeera Arabic tweet, which correctly translated claimed over 500 total victims or casualties, not 500 or anywhere near 500 killed.

=== Authenticity of purported call recording ===
Shortly after the explosion, the IDF released an audio recording purportedly containing an intercepted conversation between two Hamas operatives saying that a misfired rocket launched by PIJ caused the explosion. BBC Verify and CNN said they could not verify the recording. Channel 4 News reported on a forensic analysis of the alleged Hamas operative audio released by the IDF, concluding that it was digitally manipulated. Two Arabic language journalists said that the recording did not appear authentic, because the "language, accent, dialect, syntax and tone" were not credible. A forensic sound analysis performed by Earshot, a sonic analysis company, concluded that the audio recording had been edited to fuse two channels that were recorded separately, one for each speaker.

A translation of the audio by The New Arab found that the spoken words did not match the English subtitles provided by the IDF. An investigation by fact-checking website Misbar found that the information in the recording was inconsistent with the satellite footage of the blast.

Voice of America (VOA) and NBC News quote a U.S. intelligence official who said that their conclusions regarding the cause of the explosion were based in part on another audio recording, different from the publicly available one and assessed as authentic by language experts. According to Muhammad Shehada, communications chief of Euro-Mediterranean Human Rights Monitor: "the dialect sounds dead foreign to Gaza itself". A Palestinian activist told +972 Magazine that he was "stunned to hear his own voice" in the recordings released by the IDF and that he had never been a Hamas member.

=== Governments and other entities ===
==== Israel ====
The Israel Defense Forces (IDF) said the cause of the blast was a misfired rocket targeting the Israeli city of Haifa and launched by Palestinian Islamic Jihad (PIJ), a Palestinian militant group allied with Hamas. Rear Admiral Daniel Hagari of the IDF Spokesperson's Unit said that intelligence indicated that PIJ had launched a barrage of rockets near the hospital, and shared drone-collected aerial photography that he said was inconsistent with Israeli munitions.

The IDF specifically said that the misfired rocket was part of a barrage of 10 rockets launched by the Islamic Jihad at 6:59 p.m. from a cemetery near the al-Ahli hospital. BBC journalists noted a discrepancy in the IDF statements, because while there is a cemetery behind al-Ahli, the Israeli military presented a map with a different location of the supposed launch site; it was a place located a few kilometers away from the hospital, and no cemetery is located there.

The IDF also published audio that it says contains intercepted discussions among Hamas militants saying that a misfired Palestinian Islamic Jihad (PIJ) rocket caused the explosion. BBC Verify said that it could not verify the recording. Hamas said the recording was fabricated. Channel 4 said that it was told by "two independent Arab journalists" that the audio was not credible "because of the language, accent, dialect, syntax and tone".

On 18 October, the IDF released drone footage, which it said showed the hospital before and after the explosion. The annotated video showed burned vehicles in the hospital parking lot, and noted the apparent lack of a crater or significant structural damage to surrounding buildings. The IDF said these attributes were inconsistent with the aftermath of Israeli munition strikes.

Following the explosion, the official Israel Twitter account published a statement saying that the attack was the result of an enemy rocket. Attached to the tweet was footage, purported to be proof of the rocket coming from Gaza. Aric Toler, a journalist on the visual investigations team of The New York Times, said that the timestamps on the video were at least 40 minutes after the explosion was known to have occurred. Shortly after, the Israeli government Twitter account edited the tweet, removing the video from it. The IDF said it was not involved with the video, and attributed it to the Israeli Ministry of Foreign Affairs.

According to The New York Times, Israel has declined its requests to share logs of its military activity in the area at the time of the explosion or say what video it was basing its assessment that a failed Palestinian rocket launch was responsible for the blast on.

==== Hamas and Palestinian Islamic Jihad ====
The Gaza Health Ministry (GHM) said the explosion was caused by an Israeli airstrike. Palestinian Islamic Jihad (PIJ) has denied responsibility, blaming Israel for the explosion and drawing attention to the fact that Israel had also hit the hospital on 14 October and previously ordered its evacuation. Hamas said that Israel struck the hospital as punishment for the failure to evacuate.

David Leonhardt of The New York Times wrote on 20 October that "Gaza officials and their supporters have three main arguments, all circumstantial":

- First, Palestinians have said that the al-Ahli Arab Hospital was hit by rocket fire three days earlier, although according to The New York Times, the source of the rocket fire remains unclear, and staff had received text messages and phone calls demanding that the hospital be evacuated. Anglican Archbishop Hosam Naoum said the Israeli military had telephoned and texted the hospital at least three times since 14 October, asking patients and staff to leave. He said these warnings were specific to the hospital, and not part of Israel's general push to have civilians leave northern Gaza: "There were specific warnings to get out of the building".
- Second, Israel dissembled about civilian casualties before, such as in the death of Palestinian-American journalist Shireen Abu Akleh.
- Third, Israeli government officials have put out inconsistent information regarding the hospital explosion, including a video of a rocket barrage showing a time stamp well after the time of the explosion. Hananya Naftali is frequently cited on this point. Naftali, an Israeli social media influencer and a social media advisor to Netanyahu, initially posted a statement on Twitter, stating the Israeli Air Force (IAF) had struck a Hamas terrorist base inside a hospital. Naftali promptly deleted this, later stating that his previous post was a false assumption he had made based on a Reuters report. PolitiFact found no evidence of Naftali being "an official spokesperson for Israel or its military", adding that "He said in an Oct. 14 Facebook video that Netanyahu assigned him to a task force to defend Israel in the media".

Hamas failed to produce or describe any evidence linking Israel to the explosion. Islamic Jihad claimed to have a missile fragment, but have not produced it." Ghazi Hamad, a Hamas spokesperson, told the Associated Press (AP) that Hamas would welcome a United Nations (UN) investigation of the cause of the explosion. He told The New York Times on 22 October that the munition was not available for inspection because it had: "dissolved like salt in the water. It's vaporized. Nothing is left".

A witness told Human Rights Watch (HRW) that workers from Hamas' Interior Ministry removed all shrapnel from the explosion site. The BBC said that, in photographs taken in the moments following the explosion, Hamas-affiliated security forces with clothing bearing logos of the Palestinian police's Explosive Ordnance Disposal Unit could be seen inspecting the point of impact. An expert consulted by the BBC said that it would be highly unusual for there to be no debris left behind by such an explosion. Le Monde observed that the Palestinian police's EOD division's duties, according to their website, include collecting projectile debris and the investigation of explosions. On 22 October 2023, Hamas declined a request by The New York Times to view any remnants of the object that had struck the parking lot, and did not answer specific questions from Human Rights Watch (HRW) about the remnants in their written response on 25 November 2023.

N. R. Jenzen-Jones, director of the Australia-based Armament Research Services, said that:

"[O]ne would expect remnants to be recoverable in all but the most extreme circumstances, and the available imagery of the hospital site suggests something ought to be identifiable on the ground."

And he told The New York Times that recoverable debris should be present based on satellite imagery. Marc Garlasco echoed this sentiment, indicating that in his 20 years of investigating war crimes, including during three wars in Gaza, this is the first time there were no remnants to be seen. Hamas told The Washington Post that it possessed remnants of the munition and that "they will soon be shown to the world", directly contradicting what was said to The New York Times. David Leonhardt concluded that Hamas's failure to produce evidence from the projectile "suggests the group may not want outsiders to see it".

During an Israeli interrogation, a PIJ spokesman said that the group was responsible for the explosion and that it had attempted to blame Israel in an attempt to "erase this story".

==== United States ====
U.S. president Joe Biden supported the Israeli account of events, and referred to Pentagon intelligence sources that indicate the explosion was caused by a Palestinian Islamic Jihad (PIJ) rocket misfire.

U.S. officials said that the U.S. had collected "high confidence" signals intelligence indicating that the PIJ was responsible. Adrienne Watson, a spokesperson for the United States National Security Council (NSC), said:

"While we continue to collect information, our current assessment, based on analysis of overhead imagery, intercepts and open-source information, is that Israel is not responsible for the explosion at the hospital in Gaza yesterday."

Other U.S. intelligence officials concurred, adding the analysis was still preliminary and investigations would continue.

Blake Spendley of CNA (Note: US federally funded nonprofit, primarily through the US Department of Defense) said on 18 October that: "At the moment, the preponderance of evidence does point to it being a Hamas or PIJ rocket hitting the area".

On 24 October 2023, U.S. intelligence officials briefed reporters or the New York Times, NBC News, and other U.S. media, including on the intelligence community's assessment of the explosion on condition of anonymity. The New York Times reported that Palestinian communications intercepted by Israel and publicly available video gave the intelligence community high confidence that a rocket launched from Gaza experienced a "catastrophic motor failure", causing the warhead to fall near the hospital. The officials said their analysis focused primarily on the Al Jazeera video that captured the moment of the explosion during a live broadcast, though they also considered signals intelligence and images of the aftermath of the explosion. They further said that their assessment was also based on the absence of any Israeli weapon presented by Palestinians at the site of the explosion.

According to the U.S. officials, the videos showing the fireball and fire-damaged vehicles in the hospital parking lot are consistent with a malfunctioning missile. The officials also told The Times that they had authenticated communications intercepts provided by Israeli intelligence, all of which consisted of Hamas members: "discussing their belief that the explosion was caused by an errant or malfunctioning rocket fired by Palestinian Islamic Jihad". The officials also told The Times that they had low confidence in their assessment of a death toll between 100 and 300, noting that an accurate figure was impossible to confirm because of the absence of independent sources. The Washington Post reported that the U.S. intelligence community had determined with "high confidence" that the cause of the explosion was not an Israeli airstrike and, "absent other points of information and supporting material", with "low confidence" that Palestinian fighters were responsible for the rocket that struck the parking lot. NBC News quoted an intelligence official who said that the intelligence community: "assessed with high confidence that Israel was not responsible for the explosion at the hospital and that Palestinian militants were responsible" and that they assessed with low confidence that Palestine Islamic Jihad had launched the rocket.

==== France ====
France's Directorate of Military Intelligence (DRM) said that a misfired rocket from within Gaza was the "most probable cause". A French military official who spoke with Associated Press (AP) on condition of anonymity said that French intelligence drew this conclusion from classified information, satellite imagery, intelligence shared by other countries, and open-source information. The official said that the blast crater was indicative of an explosive charge of approximately 5 kilograms, which is consistent with several types of rockets used by Palestinian militant groups. With regard to the origin of the rocket, the French official said that the impact hole suggested the projectile was on a south-to-north trajectory.

In addition, the French military intelligence official indicated that, while he could not say for certain, the reported death toll of 471 did not seem possible based on the apparent size of the rocket.

==== Canada ====
As of 19 October 2023, Canada had refrained from taking a position regarding the cause of the explosion. Prime Minister Justin Trudeau said that Canadian officials "saw some preliminary evidence", but would continue to work with allies "before reaching any firm and final conclusion". On 21 October, Canada's Department of National Defence (DND) announced that an independent analysis conducted by Canadian Forces Intelligence Command (CFINTCOM) had determined: "with a high degree of confidence that Israel did not strike the hospital on October 17, 2023", and that the more likely cause was an errant rocket fired from inside Gaza. The assessment was based on open source intelligence and classified reporting.

==== United Kingdom ====
Rishi Sunak, the British Prime Minister, told the House of Commons that, relying on British intelligence agencies, the government had concluded that the blast was likely the result of a Palestinian rocket fired towards Israel. He also criticized the initial reporting, saying it had a negative impact on the region.

==== Italy ====
Antonio Tajani, Italy's Foreign Minister, said on 24 October 2023 that the cause of the explosion was not an Israeli missile and that the death toll was around 50. He did not indicate what evidence formed the basis of his comments.

== Reactions ==
Palestinian Authority (PA) President Mahmoud Abbas declared three days of mourning following the deadly event and canceled a planned meeting with U.S. President Joe Biden. Biden said that he was "outraged and deeply saddened by the explosion", but he did not immediately attribute blame for the incident, saying instead that the US would investigate the event. Canadian Prime Minister Justin Trudeau described the explosion as "horrible" and "unacceptable", but did not assign blame. The Director-General of the World Health Organization (WHO), Tedros Adhanom Ghebreyesus, condemned the alleged attack. The secretary-general of the United Nations, António Guterres, said that he was "horrified by the killing of hundreds of Palestinian civilians in a strike on a hospital". UN human rights chief, Volker Türk, condemned the "totally unacceptable" and "horrific" strike and demanded accountability. Médecins Sans Frontières (Doctors without Borders) said it was "horrified" by the "recent bombing", and called it a "massacre". The Red Cross was "shocked and horrified" by the reports. Indian Prime Minister Narendra Modi conveyed condolences to President Mahmoud Abbas.

Israeli President Isaac Herzog condemned Palestinian Islamic Jihad (PIJ), writing: "Shame on the vile terrorists in Gaza who willfully spill the blood of the innocent". Herzog said that accusations that Israel caused the blast were "a 21st-century blood libel".

Egypt, Iran, Iraq, Jordan, and Turkey condemned what they said was an Israeli attack on the al-Ahli hospital.

=== Hezbollah ===
Hezbollah, a Lebanese Shia militia supported by the Islamic Republic of Iran and aligned with Hamas, said the blast was an Israeli "massacre" and called for a "day of rage" on 18 October against Israel and Biden's pending visit to the Middle East. Following the hospital blast, Hezbollah declared a "day of rage against the enemy" on Wednesday. In response, numerous protesters congregated outside the French and U.S. embassies in Lebanon's capital, hurling stones at the buildings while chanting slogans such as "death to America" and "death to Israel," as reported by AFP. In light of the situation, the Beirut government made the decision to shut down schools throughout the country on Wednesday.

=== Qatar ===
Qatar condemned what they described as "a dangerous escalation".

=== Saudi Arabia ===
The Kingdom of Saudi Arabia (KSA) condemned: "the forces of the occupation" for the alleged attack, which it described as a: "heinous crime".

=== Russia ===
Russia and the United Arab Emirates (UAE) called for an urgent meeting of the United Nations Security Council (UNSC). The King of Jordan, Abdullah II, said that the Middle East was "on the brink of falling into the abyss" amid fears that the conflict could escalate into a wider war involving other armed groups. Dmitry Medvedev, the Deputy Chairman of the Russian Security Council, condemned the explosion on the messaging app Telegram as a "blatant act of war", and placed the blame on the United States for this tragic incident. He emphasized that those who profit from wars in various countries and continents bear the ultimate responsibility for it. Furthermore, he criticized the reckless distribution of vast sums of money for weapons, which only serves to strengthen the military-industrial complex. Medvedev also highlighted the hypocrisy of those who claim to have a global mission to safeguard democratic values, specifically referring to the United States.

In a similar vein, Maria Zakharova, the spokesperson for Russia's Foreign Ministry, recalled former U.S. President Barack Obama's claim that American policies had made the world a much safer place and suggested that the explosion and other recent events have clearly demonstrated the fallacy of such claims. According to Reuters, the foreign ministry said on Wednesday that Israel must present satellite images as evidence to disprove its involvement in the explosion. Dmitry Polyanskiy, the country's deputy envoy to the UN, mentioned on Twitter that Russia, along with the United Arab Emirates (UAE) and China, has suggested the inclusion of a condemnation of the blast in a resolution drafted by Brazil, which calls for a "humanitarian pause" in the Israel–Hamas conflict. The resolution was voted upon by the UNSC on Wednesday.

=== Iran ===
Iranian Supreme Leader Ali Khamenei mentioned just hours before the hospital explosion on Tuesday that "the U.S. is responsible for the recent crimes". He added "If the crimes of the Zionist regime continue, no one can stop the Muslims and the resistance forces", the post was captioned. Iranian President Ebrahim Raisi promised a "harsh response" to what happened. In Iran, many of protesters went to the streets on the capital Tehran early Wednesday in support of the people of Palestine. Dozens were seen setting the Israeli national flag on fire and chanting "death to Israel."

=== China ===
During a press conference on Wednesday, a spokesperson from the Chinese foreign ministry expressed deep shock and condemnation towards the hospital attack in Gaza, which resulted in a significant number of casualties. The spokesperson conveyed heartfelt condolences to the victims and offered sympathies to those who were injured. China urgently appeals for an immediate ceasefire and an end to the ongoing hostilities, emphasizing the utmost importance of safeguarding civilians and preventing any further escalation that could lead to a more severe humanitarian crisis.

=== Turkey ===
Turkey declared three days of mourning for the victims of the explosion.

=== North Korea ===
Without providing any evidence, the Foreign Ministry of North Korea accused Israel of bombing the hospital "under the undisguised patronage of the United States" and alleged that the United States was guilty of "giving Israel a green light to massacre Palestinians without any worries".

=== Indonesia ===
Indonesia's foreign ministry, expressed on Twitter that the "Israeli attack" flagrantly disregarded "international humanitarian law". The ministry's official statement emphasized the prolonged and ongoing injustice faced by the Palestinian people, urging the international community to prioritize the establishment of a fair and equitable peace for Palestine.

=== Malaysia ===
In Southeast Asia's Malaysia, Prime Minister Anwar Ibrahim expressed his dismay over the Gaza hospital explosion, labeling it as "madness", and urgently called for a ceasefire. Furthermore, he criticized Western nations for their stance in the ongoing conflict. Anwar highlighted the inconsistency in Western countries' interpretation of human rights, stating: "It is truly unfortunate that those nations, who frequently advocate for human rights, actually perceive them in two distinct categories". He further elaborated, "Some are placed in the 'Class 1' category, while others are unjustly labeled as 'slaves'".

To emphasize his point, Anwar shared a photo of a sign that read: "Israel bombs hospitals. Biden pays for it". As the PM prepared to address the Israel–Hamas conflict during an inaugural summit between Southeast Asian and Gulf states, he has previously resisted pressure to denounce Hamas, affirming Malaysia's commitment to maintaining its relationship with the Islamist group.

=== Jordan ===
Following the hospital explosion, Jordanian authorities abruptly canceled Biden's scheduled trip to Amman, the capital of Jordan, where he was supposed to meet with Abbas, King Abdullah II of Jordan, and Egyptian president Abdel Fattah el-Sisi. In a statement, the Jordanian authorities mentioned that the summit would not have the ability to halt the ongoing war. According to a post by Jordan's Royal Hashemite Court, King Abdullah II described the hospital blast as a reprehensible act of war that cannot be overlooked.

=== Syria ===
In statement shared on Twitter, Syrian President Bashar al-Assad expressed his deep condemnation of the hospital attack, describing it as an abhorrent and extremely brutal act that stands as one of the most atrocious and bloodiest massacres in modern history.

Furthermore, Assad emphasized in a separate post that Syria holds Western nations, particularly the United States, accountable for this massacre and other similar acts of violence. He asserted that these countries are complicit in the organized killings perpetrated against the Palestinian people, stating that they are closely aligned with the state of Israel.

=== Red Cross and Red Crescent ===
The hospital blast has been unanimously condemned by the constituent members of the International Red Cross and Red Crescent Movement, which is recognized as the largest humanitarian network in the world. In response to the explosion, the International Committee of the Red Cross expressed their strong stance by stating: "No patient should lose their life while being treated in a hospital bed". They further emphasized the importance of protecting hospitals under international humanitarian law and highlighted the tragic loss of doctors who were striving to save lives.

Francesco Rocca, the president of the International Federation of Red Cross and Red Crescent Societies, also voiced his condemnation on the matter. He emphasized the significance of adhering to rules even during times of war, stating: "Even war has rules!" The IFRC expressed their shock and dismay over the loss of life in the incident, stating that there are no words to describe the immense human suffering caused. They emphasized that hospitals should serve as sanctuaries for all, and it is deeply distressing that patients and individuals seeking refuge lost their lives in this tragic event.

=== World Health Organisation (WHO) ===
The hospital bombing in Gaza was strongly condemned by the World Health Organisation (WHO), which emphasized the importance of abiding by international humanitarian law. The WHO said that health care facilities should be actively protected and never targeted. According to the WHO, the hospital was one of 20 in the northern part of Gaza that had received evacuation orders from the Israeli military. However, due to the current insecurity, critical condition of patients, lack of ambulances, staff, health system bed capacity, and alternative shelter for the displaced, carrying out these orders was deemed impossible.

On a separate occasion—UN Secretary-General—António Guterres expressed his condemnation of the strike and his horror at the killing of hundreds of Palestinians. He reiterated that hospitals and medical personnel are protected under international humanitarian law. Guterres called for an immediate humanitarian ceasefire and emphasized that the original attack by Hamas on Israel should not justify the collective punishment of the Palestinian people.

=== Médecins Sans Frontières (Doctors without Borders) ===
Médecins Sans Frontières, also known as Doctors without Borders, said: "Nothing justifies this shocking attack on a hospital and its many patients and health workers, as well as the people who sought shelter there". Dr. Ghassan Abu-Sittah, a British volunteer with Doctors without Borders at al-Ahli hospital, said afterwards that the explosion was when Israel's actions "stopped being a war, and became a genocide".

=== Norwegian Refugee Council ===
Jan Egeland, secretary general of the Norwegian Refugee Council, an independent organization that assists in order to displaced persons and that is active in Gaza, posted: "The massacre of children at the Gaza Hospital should lead to a ceasefire and end to missiles on/from densely populated Gaza, whoever triggered this fateful missile". Egeland also said: "A war with many more dead kids than armed men is considered to be a very dirty war".

=== On culpability ===
Biden subsequently said at a meeting with Israeli Prime Minister Benjamin Netanyahu that: "Based on what I've seen, it appears as though it was done by the other team, not you", later adding "I'm not suggesting that Hamas deliberately did it, either – it's that old thing: You've got to learn how to shoot straight".

Saudi Arabia, Jordan, Qatar, the UAE, Bahrain, Oman, Egypt, Lebanon, Pakistan, Algeria, and Libya condemned the explosions as attacks, and accused Israeli forces of bombing the hospital. The UAE and Bahrain condemned the explosions as Israeli attacks, and demanded an "immediate cessation of hostilities". The Turkish President Recep Tayyip Erdoğan denounced the bombing as: "the latest example of Israeli attacks devoid of the most basic human values". Moussa Faki, Chairperson of the African Union Commission, denounced the IDF attack as a "war crime" and demanded that other countries stop what they said was Israeli aggression.

=== Calls for international investigation ===
On 19 October 2023, during a State Department daily briefing, U.S. Department of State spokesperson Matthew Miller, indicated that he did not believe an international investigation into the explosion was "appropriate at this time" given the fact that Israel had provided evidence to support its claims, whereas Hamas had provided none.

On 20 October 2023, the United Nations Human Rights Office (OHCHR) called for an independent investigation into the explosion. A spokesperson for the office said that there was a need for accountability and observed that it would be difficult for the UN to monitor an investigation because of the ongoing conflict between Israel and Hamas.

On 26 November 2023, Human Rights Watch (HRW) published a report finding that the cause of the explosion was likely a misfired Palestinian rocket, but that the victims and their families deserved full answers concerning the circumstances, including the identity of those responsible for launching or authorizing the attack–something that only a thorough investigation and analysis of all evidence could provide. Human Rights Watch (HRW) observed that the mandate of the Independent International Commission of Inquiry on the Occupied Palestinian Territory, which was established by the United Nations Human Rights Council (UNHRC) in 2021, gave it authority to investigate the incident, and said that the commission had previously issued a statement indicating that it was documenting human rights violations committed by all parties in the context of the ongoing armed conflict.

== See also ==
- Attacks on health facilities during the Gaza war
- Misinformation in the Gaza war
- Al-Shifa Hospital siege
- Kamal Adwan Hospital sieges
- Gaza genocide
