= Hannan =

Hannan may refer to:

- Hannan (surname), a common Irish surname coming from the Gaelic Ó hAnnáin or Ó hAnáin
- Hannan (Arabic: "gracious"), popular first name in Middle-Eastern cultures
- Hannan Azlan, Malaysian stand-up comedian
- Hannan, Osaka, city in southern Osaka Prefecture, Japan
- Hannan University, a university located to the south of Osaka, Japan
- Hannan District, in Wuhan, Hubei, China
- Hannan Rathorr, in Kashmir

== See also ==
- Hanan (disambiguation)
- Hennan
