= Hanin =

Hanin may refer to:

== Given name ==
- Hanin Elias (born 1972), German industrial/techno musician of Syrian descent
- Hanin Sayyed, Lebanese politician
- Hanin Tamim (born 2000), Lebanese footballer

== Surname ==
- Florent Hanin (born 1990), French professional footballer
- Leo Hanin (1913–2008), Russian Zionist activist
- Roger Hanin (1925–2015), French actor and film director

== Other ==
- Hanin (한인), an autonym for Koreans, especially of oversea Koreans
- Hanine, a village in southern Lebanon
- Hanin Corporation, Chinese printer manufacturer.
