= Hanani (name) =

Hanani or Chanani (Hebrew: חֲנָנִי) is a Hebrew name which means "God has gratified me" or "God is gracious". The name may refer to:

- Haim Hanani (1912–1991), Israeli mathematician
- Khaled Hanani (born 1978), Algerian athlete
- Nidhi Chanani (born 1975), American artist
- Yasmine Hanani (born 1980), American actress
- Yehuda Hanani (born 1980), American cellist

== See also ==
- Hanani
- Hananiah
