= Ordeal of the bitter water =

Trial by ordeal in the Hebrew Bible

Halakhic texts relating to this article
- Torah: Numbers 5:11–31
- Mishnah: Sotah
- Babylonian Talmud: Sotah
- Jerusalem Talmud: Sotah
- Mishneh Torah: Sefer Nashim, Sotah

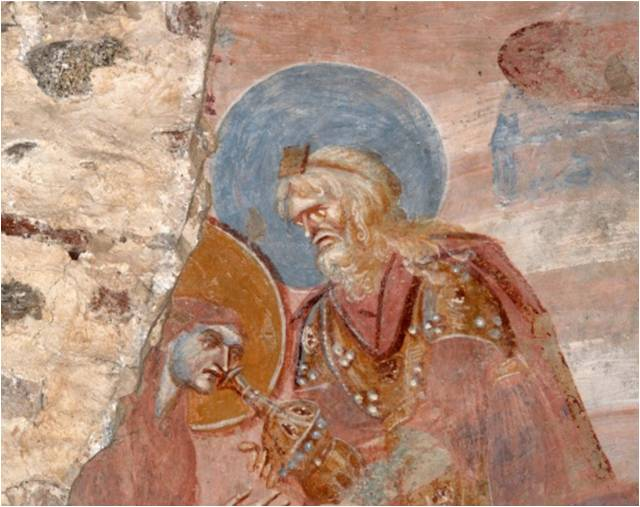
Fresco in Castelseprio depicting the Virgin Mary undergoing the ordeal of the bitter water

In the Hebrew Bible, the ordeal of the bitter water was a Jewish trial by ordeal administered by a priest in the tabernacle to a wife whose husband suspected her of adultery, but the husband had no witnesses to make a formal case. It is described in the Book of Numbers (Numbers 5:11–31).

== Terms ==
Bitter water is "מֵי הַמָּרִים" mei ha-marim. In Rabbinic Judaism, the woman undergoing this ritual was called a sotah (Hebrew: שוטה / סוטה, "strayer"). The term sotah itself is not found in the Hebrew Bible but is Mishnaic Hebrew based on the verse "if she has strayed" (verb: שטה satah) in Numbers 5:12. The ordeal is discussed in the Sotah tractate of the Talmud.

According to Tikva Frymer-Kensky, the ritual is not actually an "ordeal" which provides a verdict on the woman's guilt for use by human judges for the issuance of the penalty for adultery on the woman (which would be execution by stoning), but rather takes the form of a "purgatory oath, in which the individual swearing the oath puts herself under divine jurisdiction, expecting to be punished by God if the oath-taker is guilty".

This ritual is not to be confused with Deuteronomy 22:13–19, in which a man accuses his newlywed bride of premarital sex with someone else.

== Hebrew Bible ==
The account of the ordeal of bitter water is given in the Book of Numbers:

Then Yahweh spoke to Moses, saying, "Speak to the sons of Israel and say to them, 'If any man's wife goes astray and is unfaithful to him, and a man lies sexually with her, and it is hidden from the eyes of her husband, and she is undetected; but she has defiled herself, and there is no witness against her, and she has not been caught in the act, if a spirit of jealousy comes over him and he is jealous of his wife and she has defiled herself, or if a spirit of jealousy comes over him and he is jealous of his wife but she has not defiled herself, the man shall then bring his wife to the priest and shall bring as an offering for her one-tenth of an ephah of barley meal; he shall not pour oil on it nor put frankincense on it, for it is a grain offering of jealousy, a grain offering of remembrance, a reminder of iniquity.

'Then the priest shall bring her near and have her stand before Yahweh, and the priest shall take holy water in an earthenware vessel; and the priest shall take some of the dust that is on the floor of the tabernacle and put it into the water. The priest shall then have the woman stand before Yahweh and let the hair of the woman's head go loose, and he shall place the grain offering of remembrance in her hands, which is the grain offering of jealousy; and in the hand of the priest is to be the water of bitterness that brings curses. Then the priest shall have her swear an oath and shall say to the woman, "If no man has lain with you, and if you have not gone astray into defilement, being under the authority of your husband, be free from this water of bitterness that brings curses; if you, however, have gone astray, being under the authority of your husband, and if you have defiled yourself, and a man other than your husband has lain with you" (then the priest shall have the woman swear with the oath of the curse, and the priest shall say to the woman), "Yahweh make you a curse and an oath among your people by Yahweh making your thigh fall away and your abdomen swell; and this water that brings curses shall go into your stomach and make your abdomen swell and your thigh fall away." And the woman shall say, "Amen. Amen."

'The priest shall then write these curses on a scroll, and he shall wash them off into the water of bitterness. Then he shall make the woman drink the water of bitterness that brings curses, so that the water which brings a curse will go into her to cause bitterness. And the priest shall take the grain offering of jealousy from the woman's hand, and he shall wave the grain offering before Yahweh and bring it near to the altar; and the priest shall take a handful of the grain offering as its memorial offering and offer it up in smoke on the altar, and afterward he shall make the woman drink the water. So he will have her drink the water, and it will be that, if she has defiled herself and has been unfaithful to her husband, that the water which brings curses will go into her to cause bitterness, and her abdomen will swell and her thigh will fall away, and the woman will become a curse among her people. But if the woman has not defiled herself and is clean, she will then be free and conceive a seed.

'This is the law of jealousy: when a wife, being under the authority of her husband, goes astray and defiles herself, or when a spirit of jealousy comes over a man and he is jealous of his wife, he shall then make the woman stand before Yahweh, and the priest shall apply all this law to her. Moreover, the man will be free from guilt, but that woman shall bear her guilt.'"

— Numbers 5:11–31

=== The ordeal ===
When a man suspects his wife of having sex with another man but has no witnesses, the woman is brought to a kohen (priest), or before God.

The woman is required by the biblical passage to have loosened hair during the ritual (Numbers 5:18). This is often taken to be a symbol of the woman's supposed shame, but according to Josephus, it was merely the standard behaviour for anyone accused of any crime when they appeared before the Sanhedrin.

The husband was required to make a sacrificial offering as part of the ritual, probably due to a general principle that no one should seek answers from God without giving something in return. This offering is placed in the wife's hands, and is described as her offering for her. Scholars think that it is the man's offering, concerning the ordeal of his wife, and that her holding of it is merely symbolic of this.

The offering specified is an omer of barley meal, unaccompanied by oil or frankincense; this is the cheaper type of flour, unlike the flour specified for all other biblical sacrifices. The specification is now thought to be a rare survival of an earlier period, in which there was no restriction on the types of flour which could be used for sacrifices, although the Mishnah argues that it was a reference to the bestial nature of adultery, coarse flour being the food of beasts.

The ordeal consisted of the wife having to drink a specific potion administered by the priest. The text specifies that the potion should be made from water and dust. In the Masoretic Text, the water used for the potion must be holy water, and the Targum interprets it as water from the Molten Sea, but the Septuagint instead requires running water. The passage states that the curse was washed into the water; it is thought that this idea derives from a belief that the words of a curse exist in their own right. Others argue that the curse is a euphemism for a miscarriage or infertility.

The potion also had to be mixed in an earthenware vessel. This may have been because the potion was regarded as impure, and therefore also made the vessel impure, necessitating its subsequent destruction (see Leviticus 11:33). However, the Talmud and Rashi explain that this vessel is chosen to contrast the woman's predicament with her behavior.

If the woman was unharmed by the bitter water, the rules regard her as innocent of the accusation. The account in the Book of Numbers states that the man shall be free from blame.

=== The punishment ===
In cases of guilt, the text does not specify the amount of time needed for the potion to take effect; 19th century scholars suspected it was probably intended to have a fairly immediate effect. Maimonides records the traditional rabbinical view: "Her belly swells first and then her thigh ruptures and she dies". Other scholars maintain that since the word "thigh" is often used in the Bible as a euphemism for various reproductive organs, in this case it may mean the uterus, the placenta, or an embryo, with the implicit threat of death resulting from possible fatal childbirth complications.

Several commentaries on the Bible maintain that the ordeal is to be applied in the case of a woman who has become pregnant, allegedly by her extramarital lover. In this interpretation, the bitter potion could be an abortifacient, inducing a purposeful abortion or miscarriage if the woman is pregnant with a child which her husband alleges is another man's. If the fetus aborts as a result of the ordeal, this presumably confirms her guilt of adultery, otherwise her innocence is presumed if the fetus does not abort. One translation to follow this suggestion is the New International Version, which translates that the effect of the bitter water on an adulterous woman will be to make "your womb miscarry and your abdomen swell". Such a translation is effectively reading the Hebrew word yarek (יָרֵך) to mean "loins", a meaning which that word can carry.

However, Tikva Frymer-Kensky rejected this interpretation on the grounds that the Biblical text does not limit the ordeal to pregnant women, and that the phrase venizreah zera ("she shall be sown with seed", the reward given to an innocent woman after the trial) refers to conception rather than delivery. Instead, Frymer-Kensky argues that the punishment "your belly will swell and your thigh will fall" most likely refers to a uterine prolapse.

H.C. Brichto argued that the damaged reproductive system (as in some other interpretations), along with the swollen belly, indicate that the punishment is a false pregnancy.

== In rabbinic literature ==
According to the Mishnah, it was the practice for the woman to first be brought to the Sanhedrin, before being subjected to the ordeal. Repeated attempts would be made to persuade the woman to confess, including multiple suggestions to her of possible mitigating factors; if she confessed, the ordeal was not required. The Mishnah reports that, in the time of the Second Temple, she was taken to the East Gate of the Temple, in front of the Nikanor gate.

The Mishnah also states that the garment she was wearing was ripped to expose her heart. A rope was tied above her breasts so that her clothes did not completely fall off.

The Mishnah mentions that while a guilty woman would normally die immediately from the trial, her death could also be delayed by one, two or three years, if she possessed offsetting merits.

Nachmanides points out that of all the 613 commandments, it is only the sotah law that requires God's specific co-operation to make it work. The bitter waters can only be effective miraculously.

Maimonides wrote: "When she dies, the adulterer because of whom she was compelled to drink will also die, wherever he is located. The same phenomena, the swelling of the belly and the rupture of the thigh, will also occur to him. All the above applies provided her husband never engaged in forbidden sexual relations in his life. If, however, her husband ever engaged in forbidden relations, the [bitter] waters do not check [the fidelity of] his wife."

The rabbinical interpretation of Numbers 5:28 is that when a woman accused of adultery who was innocent drinks the bitter water, even if she was previously unable to conceive, she will now conceive and give birth to a male.

=== Cessation of the ordeal ===
According to Mishnah, the practice was abolished some time during the first century CE under the leadership of Yohanan ben Zakkai. If it had not been abolished then according to Jewish Law the ritual would have ceased with the fall of the Temple (in approximately the year 70 CE), as it should not have been performed elsewhere. Explanations in rabbinical literature vary concerning cessation of the practice. Yohanan Ben Zakkai stated:

When adulterers became many, the ordeal of the bitter water stopped, for the ordeal of bitter water is performed only in a case of doubt. But now there are many who see their lovers in public.

Rav Hanina of Sura said:

Nowadays a man should not say to his wife, "Do not be secluded with so-and-so", ... If she then secluded herself with the man, since we have not now the water for the suspected woman to test her, the husband forbids her to himself for all time.

== Christian references ==
Although the actual ordeal was not practiced in Christianity, it was referenced by Christian writers through the ages in relation to both the subject of adultery and also the wider practice of trial by ordeal. Additionally, some early Christian legends, such as the Gospel of Pseudo-Matthew, embroider the life of Mary, mother of Jesus with accounts including Mary and even Joseph undergoing a version of the ordeal.

== Textual analysis ==
Biblical critics from the 19th and early 20th centuries argued, based on certain textual features in the passage, that it was formed by the combination of two earlier texts. For example, the text appears to suggest first that the offering should occur before the ordeal (5:24–25), and then that it should occur after it (5:26). Due to the awkwardness of the idea that the wife has to drink the potion twice, textual scholars argue that either the first drinking must be a later addition to the text, or that the whole account of the ordeal must be spliced together from two earlier descriptions.

Similarly, noting that there are two descriptions of the location for the ritual (in the presence of a priest (5:15) and before Yahweh (5:30)) and two occasions on which the punishment for the woman is mentioned (5:21 and 5:27), the division into two earlier documents, first suggested by Bernhard Stade is typically as follows:

- one account is the ordeal and sacrifice before God, in which the possible miscarriage/abortion results from drinking the potion;
- the other is merely a condemnation by a priest, in which the woman stands with hair loosened, her guilt is assumed, and divine intervention (due to the priest's involvement) will cause a miscarriage/abortion as punishment.

Other early biblical scholars thought that the ordeal is itself a fusion of two earlier rituals (pre-dating the original priestly text), one using water, and the other dust. The use of dust might be connected to necromancy. In other historic Semitic cultures there are many instances in which holy water was regarded as taboo, and therefore that contact with it, or its consumption, was dangerous.

== Similar rituals ==
Trials by ordeal are found in other societies of the ancient Near East such as in the Laws of Hammurabi (§132).

Pre-Islamic Arabic culture similarly had an adultery ordeal, although in scientific terms, compared to the Israelite ritual it relied more on nausea, than on directly poisoning the woman. In this pre-Islamic Arabic ritual, the woman simply took oaths attesting to her innocence, and asking the divinity to cause her to have a miscarriage/abortion, should she be lying.

Ordeals involving the risk of harm, including potential injury resulting from the drinking of certain potions, were common in antiquity; in parts of Europe, their judicial use even lasted until the late Middle Ages. Such ordeals were once believed to result in a direct decision by a deity, about the guilt or innocence of the party/parties undertaking the ordeal; typically divine intervention was believed to prevent the innocent from being harmed, or to ensure that the guilty were.

The naturalist Alfred Grandidier presented similar practices among the Malagasy to argue for ancient Israelite migrations to Madagascar.

== Modern applications ==
According to Helena Zlotnick, even though the ordeal of bitter water is no longer practiced, it remains a reference point in the search for replacements for the test of adultery.

== See also ==
- Jewish views of marriage
- Nocebo
- Women in Judaism
- Sotah (Talmud)
