= Embassy of France, Beirut =

French Embassy, Beirut
- Location: Lebanon
- Address: Espace des Lettres, Damascus Road, Ras El-Nabaa, Beirut
- Coordinates: 33°52′49″N 35°30′46″E
- Ambassador: Anne Grillo
- Website: lb.ambafrance.org/-Francais

The French Embassy, Beirut is the chief diplomatic mission of France in Lebanon. Its ambassador has been Anne Grillo since 2020.

== History ==
=== Pine Residence ===
The Pine Residence, built in 1916, hosted the high commissioner of France in the Levant (known today as Lebanon and Syria) from 1919 to 1945, before becoming the ambassador's residence in 1946.

A car bomb exploded inside the French embassy compound in Beirut on the morning of 24 May 1982. It killed ten Lebanese people and two French people; it injured another 27.

In October 1990, General Michel Aoun, while combating the Syrian invasion, took refuge at the embassy before going into exile in France.

=== Espace des Lettres ===
The French embassy, including the general consulate of France and the cultural and economic services, are today in Espace des Lettres, Damascus Road in Beirut, which was the demarcation line between the Christian and the Muslim neighborhoods during the Lebanese Civil War. The new diplomatic chancellery building was integrated into the numerous pavilions in the Cité Bounoure, the old École des Lettres de Beyrouth.

=== Architecture ===
Built in 2003 by the architects Yves Lion and Claire Piguet, it integrates Jean-Charles Moreux and André Leconte's colonnade built in the 1950s, walls built with Ramleh rocks and glass structures in the middle of hundred years old pine and olive trees. The building was meant to be secure while keeping an aesthetic look.
