= Radek Haman =

Czech ice hockey player

- Born: 22 December 1969 (age 55); Žďár nad Sázavou, Czechoslovakia
- Height: 6 ft 0 in (183 cm)
- Weight: 209 lb (95 kg; 14 st 13 lb)
- Position: Forward
- Shoots: Left
- team Former teams: Free Agent; HC Kometa Brno; HC Dukla Jihlava; HC Olomouc; Orli Znojmo; HC Plzeň
- Playing career: 1987–present

Radek Haman (born 22 December 1969) is a Czech professional ice hockey center who most recently played with HC Breclav of the Czech 4, Liga. He has played the majority of his career in the Czech Republic, most notably with HC Kometa Brno and Orli Znojmo before finishing his Czech Extraliga career with HC Plzeň during the 2010–11 Czech Extraliga season.

Haman previously played for HC Olomouc, HC Kometa Brno and HC Znojemští Orli.
