= Leo Hanin =

Lithuanian-American political activist

Arie Leo Hanin (Hebrew: ליאו חנין; 20 November 1913 – 21 September 2008) was a Lithuanian-American political activist.

Born into a Jewish family in November 1913 in Vilna (Wilno, Vilnius), then in Russian Empire, he and his family left for Harbin, Manchuria (northern China), in 1916. There Leo joined a Zionist group and studied Jewish history at a Jewish primary school, and then studied at a Russian secondary school. When Japan occupied Manchuria in 1931, he went to Shanghai where attended a British school, and also served in the Jewish Shanghai Volunteer Corps. He was a leader of Shanghai Betar, the Revisionist Zionist youth organization.

In 1937, he moved to Kobe, Japan, to work in a textile firm. The small Jewish community there elected him its honorary secretary. From August 1940 to November 1941 two thousand Polish-Lithuanian Jewish refugees, who were saved from the Holocaust by the Japanese viceconsul in Kaunas, Lithuania, Chiune Sugihara, arrived into Kobe. The Jewish community helped them by finding homes, donating medical supplies and clothing, and arranging, by the Polish ambassador to Japan Tadeusz Romer, their visas so they could stay on in Japan.

In 1942 he returned to Shanghai and spent the rest of the war working there. He emigrated to Israel in 1948 and next moved to the United States where he became a naturalized citizen on March 9, 1962.

He described the Jewish community in Kobe and its activities in a special interview in 1999. Hanin died in September 2008 in Los Angeles, California at the age of 94.
