= Hanunu =

Philistine king in the 8th century BC

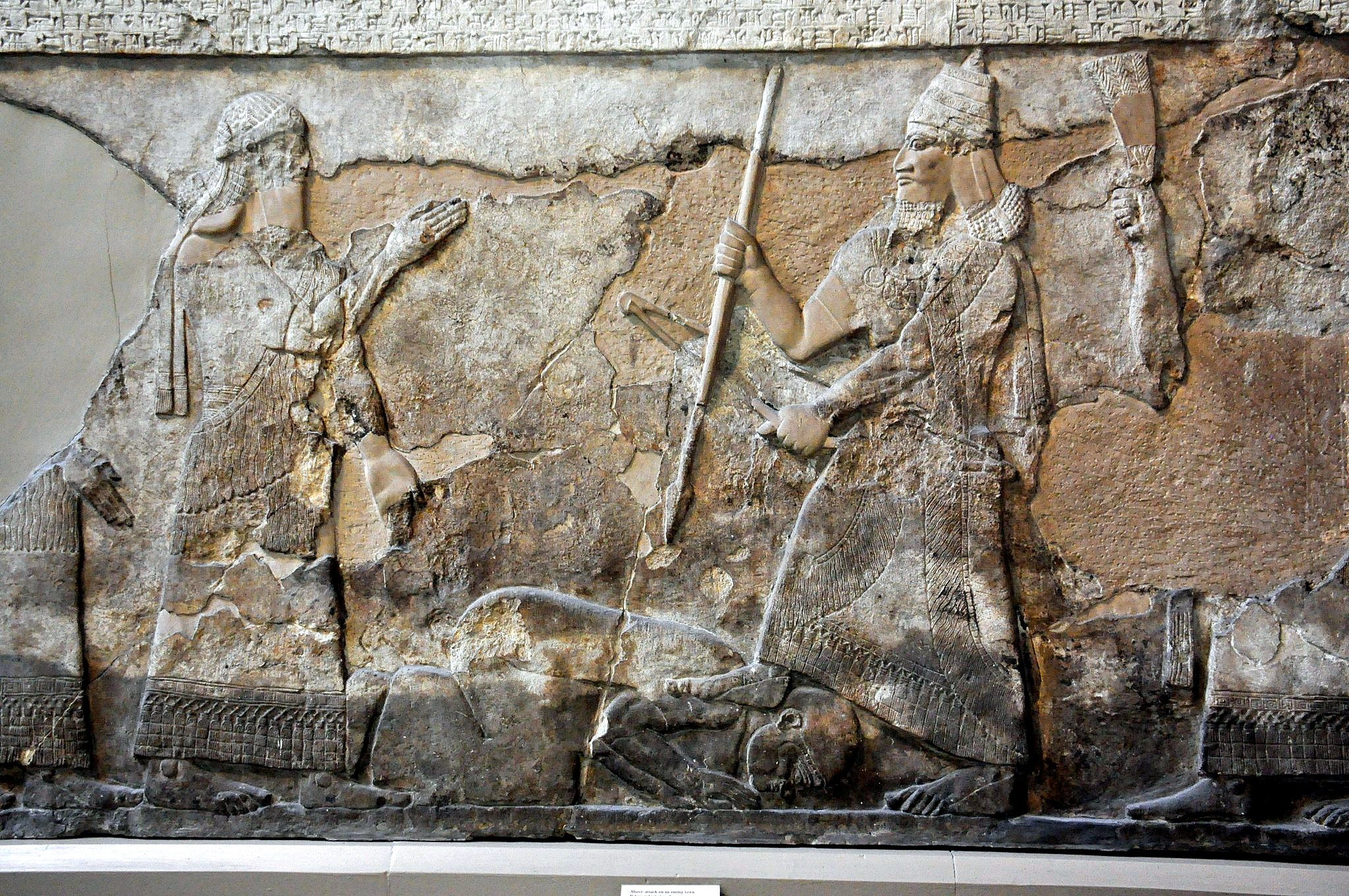
Tiglath-Pileser III trampling an enemy king, sometimes identified as Hanunu, in a relief from his palace in Kalhu. The conquest of Gaza, among other nations, are described in the surrounding inscriptions.

Hanunu (Philistine: 𐤇𐤍𐤍 *Ḥanūn; Akkadian: 𒄩𒀀𒉡𒌑𒉡 ḫa-a-nu-ú-nu, West Semitic meaning "he who has found mercy") sometimes called Hanno, was the Philistine king of Gaza during the 8th century BC. Hanunu's rule began as king of an independent kingdom of Gaza, and continued after Gaza, like much of the Levant, including Philistia, was conquered and made into an Assyrian dependency, beginning in 734 BCE. He remained a king, paying tribute to the three Assyrian emperors until he was deposed and deported to Assyria by Sargon II.

== Assyrian conquest of the Levant ==
According to the Hebrew Bible, during the mid-8th century BCE, Rezin, king of Aram-Damascus - a significant buffer state separating the Middle East from the Neo-Assyrian Empire, began forming powerful alliances with its neighboring nations, including the northern Kingdom of Israel. Fearing the threat posed by an Israel with Syrian military backing, the king of Judah, Ahaz, paid homage to the Neo-Assyrian king Tiglath-Pileser III, and appealed to him to invade the Levant. In the ensuing war, Aram-Damascus was annexed, many cities in Israel were captured, reducing the kingdom to a rump state, and Judah became a tributary to Assyria.

=== Hanunu's return to Gaza ===
During the conquest, Philistia attempted to withstand the Assyrian invasion, to little success. In 734 BC, as Tiglath-Pileser III marched through the Philistine pentapolis, Hanunu realized Gaza would not hold against the Assyrian armies, and fled to Egypt, probably to shore up support. With Gaza's capture and sacking, the Assyrians had completely conquered Philistia, and Hanunu was called back to Gaza by Tiglath-Pileser III to rule as a client king. Why Hanunu returned is unclear, Tiglath-Pileser's annals record he returned because he was "overwhelmed" by the "terrifying splendor" of the Assyrian patron deity Aššur, in reality it might have been that he had expected aid from the Egyptians due to Gaza's position in their trade network, and returned once it became clear that no help was coming.

=== Rebellion against Assyria ===
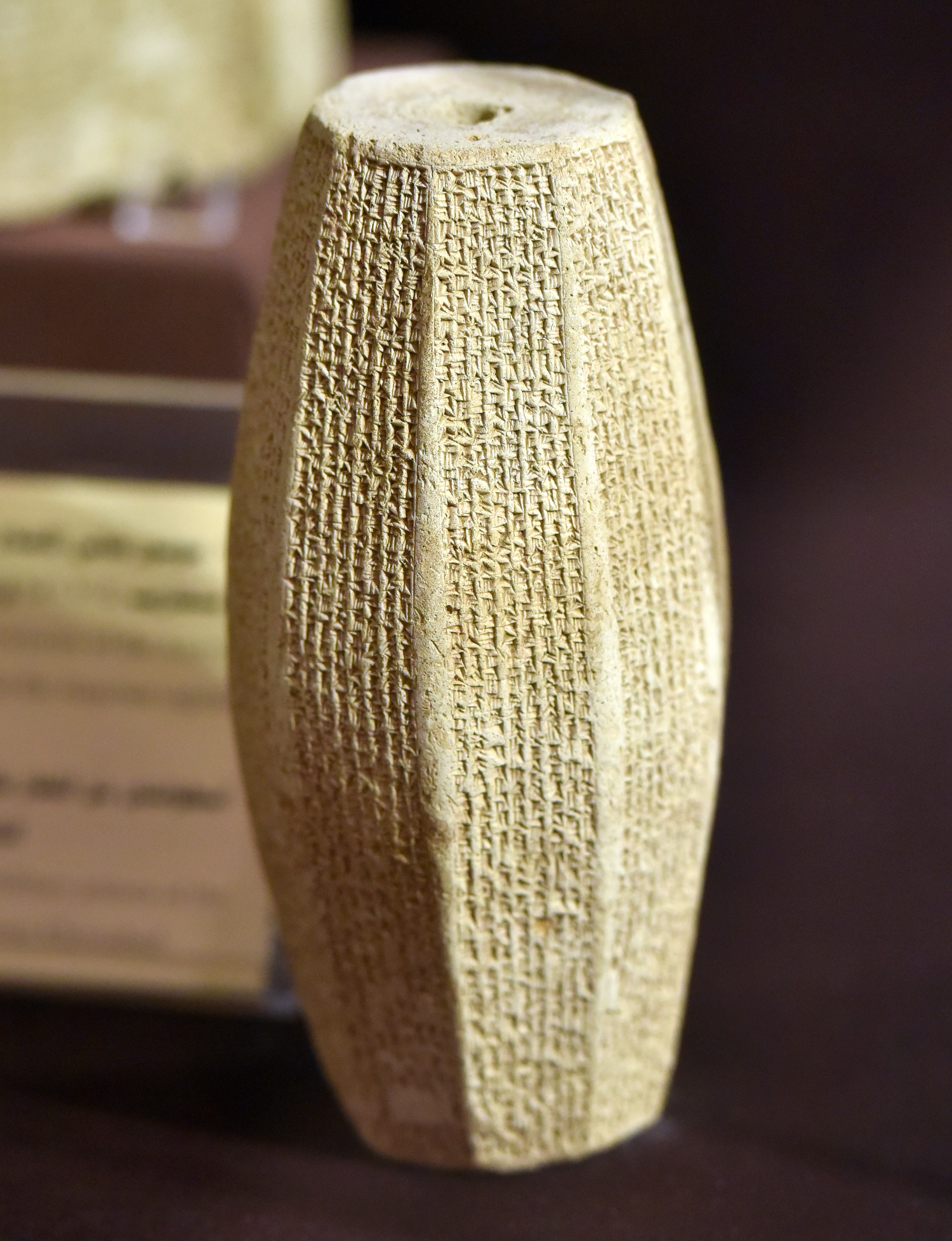
While not the exact cylinder recording Hanunu's name, this one narrating Sargon II's military campaigns elsewhere is almost exactly similar. To see the exact cylinder, follow the link to the Dartmouth museum

Under Assyrian rule, Gaza resumed its longtime role as a lucrative trading station, and brought Assyria's borders against Egypt's. Tiglath-Pileser's successor, Shalmaneser V, continued to spread the Empire's borders through the Middle East in 720 BC. During this time, Shalmaneser V was suddenly deposed by Sargon II, sending the empire into chaos. Numerous Assyrian dependencies saw opportunity in the resultant political instability and rebelled against Assyrian rule. Philistia was no exception, and Hanunu joined the other kings of Philistia in rebelling against Sargon. Egyptan forces came to support Hanunu's kingdom of Gaza, battling with the Assyrian forces at Rafah. Despite facing concurrent rebellions in other parts of the empire, Sargon II was able to decisively crush each revolt against Assyria. By 711 BC, Gath had been destroyed, Ashdod had been conquered, and Hanunu and the Egyptian forces were routed at Rafah. Following Gaza's capture, Hanunu was put in bondage and brought to Assur, his fate is unknown. The inscription recording this final chapter of Hanunu's rule, in the words of his conqueror, reads:

Sargon, prefect of Enlil, exalted priest of Assur, elect of Anu and Dagan, the great king, the mighty king, king of the universe, king of Assyria, king of the four quarters (of the world) ... who brought under his sway, beginning with the land of Rashi on the Elamite border, the people of Pakudo (and) Damunu, the cities of Dur-Kurigalzu and Rapiku, all of the desert as far as the River of Egypt, ... who devastated the wide land of Bit-Humria, at Rapihu brought about the defeat of Egypt and had Hanunu (Hanno), king of Gaza, brought in bonds to Assur; .... The sagacious king, full of kindness (words of grace), who gave his thought to the restoration of (towns) that had fallen to ruins ....
