= Sotah (Talmud) =

Tractate of the Mishnah and the Talmud

Tractate of the Talmud
- Seder: Nashim
- Number of mishnahs: 67
- Chapters: 9
- Babylonian Talmud pages: 49
- Jerusalem Talmud pages: 47
- Tosefta chapters: 15

Sotah (Hebrew: סוֹטָה or Hebrew: שׂוֹטָה, "strayer") is a tractate of the Talmud in Rabbinic Judaism. The tractate explains the ordeal of the bitter water, a trial by ordeal of a woman suspected of adultery, which is prescribed by the Book of Numbers in the Hebrew Bible (Tanakh). In most editions, this tractate is the fifth in the order of Nashim, and it is divided into nine chapters. The tractate exists in the Mishnah, Tosefta, and both the Babylonian and Jerusalem Talmud.

Sotah is also the term used for the woman tried in this manner.

== Mishnah ==
The mishnas (mishnayot) are devoted in the main to an exact definition of the rules of procedure in the case of a wife who was either actually or supposedly unfaithful. The mishnas discuss other rituals in which speech is a key component, such as egla arufa, breaking the heifer's neck; Hakheil, the Jewish King's septa-annual public Torah reading; and the Blessings and Curses of Mount Gerizim and Mount Ebal.

== Tosefta ==
The Tosefta of Sotah is divided into fifteen chapters and contains a large number of aggadic and exegetic interpretations, as well as various historical statements and narratives.

== Gemara ==
Both Gemaras, Bavli, and Yerushalmi, contain many tales and legends, aggadic interpretations, sayings, and proverbs, in addition to their elucidations of Mishnaic passages.
