= Hananya Naftali =

Israeli journalist and YouTuber (born 1995)

- חנניה נפתלי
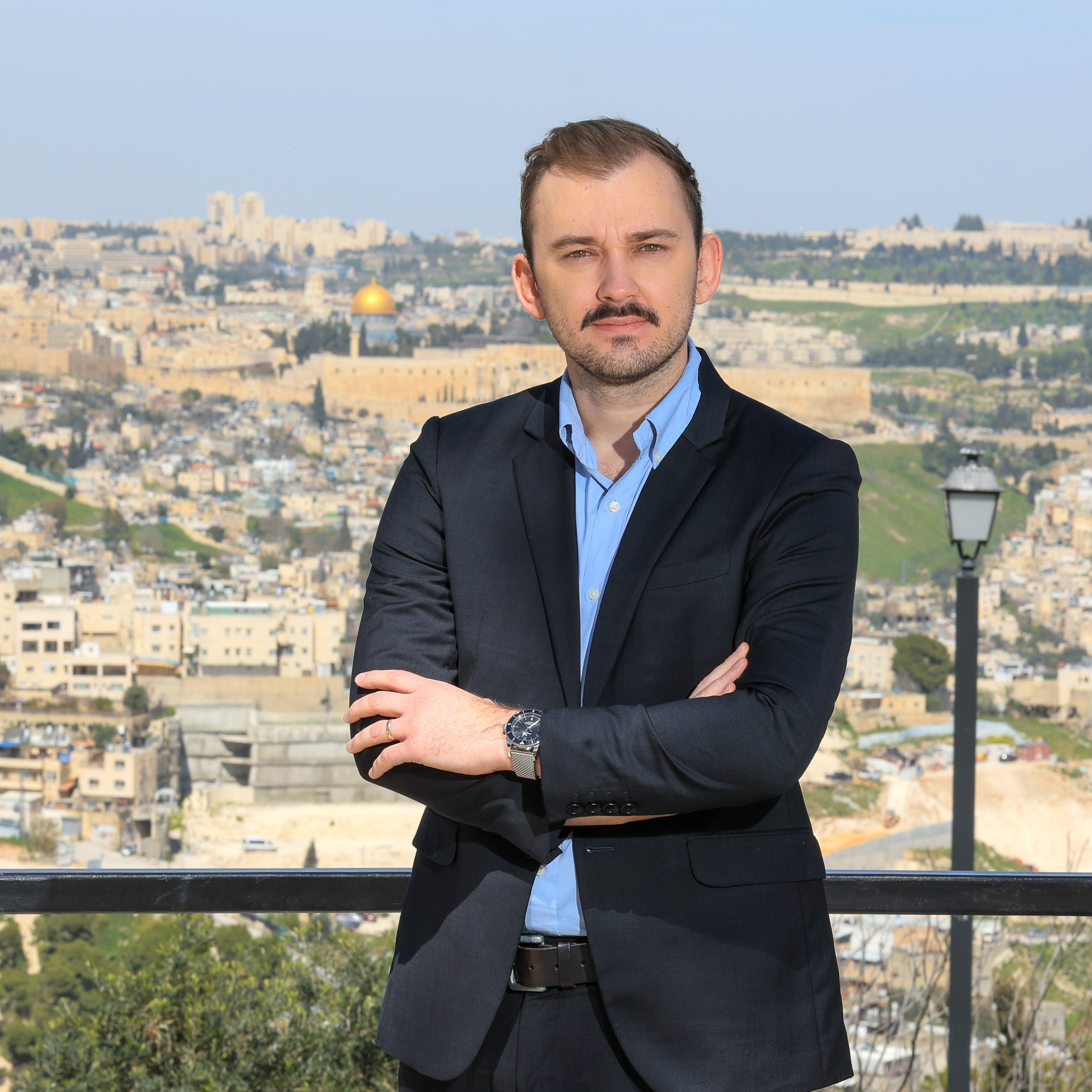
- Born: 7 July 1995 (age 31); Safed, Israel
- Occupations: Journalist, YouTuber, military personnel
- Years active: 2014–present
- Spouse: India Naftali
- Military career
- Allegiance: Israel
- Service years: 2023-present
- Conflicts: Gaza–Israel conflict; 2014 Gaza War; Gaza war

YouTube information
- Channel: Hananya Naftali
- Years active: 2012-present
- Genres: Jewish history, World War II, Holocaust, Wartime Journalism
- Subscribers: 624K
- Views: 149 million
- Last updated: 24 July 2026
- Website: hnaftali.com

Hananya Naftali (Hebrew: חנניה נפתלי; born 7 July 1995) is an Israeli journalist and YouTuber. He served as a digital aide to Israeli prime minister Benjamin Netanyahu.

== Early life and education ==
Hananya Naftali was born in Safed in 1995 to Jewish parents originally from the former Soviet Union. His parents grew up in Russia and were later relocated to Budapest, Hungary, and eventually to Tel Aviv, Israel, with assistance from the Jewish Agency for Israel. He grew up in the West Bank and graduated from Kadoorie Agricultural High School.

== Career ==
In 2017, after gaining around 200,000 followers on Facebook, Naftali was able to interview the Israeli prime minister, Benjamin Netanyahu. A few months later, he began to serve as Netanyahu's deputy social media adviser. He also worked as a freelancer for the Likud party.

Hananaya announced on X that he was drafted into the army to fight against Hamas in the Gaza war.

On 17 October 2023, in response to the Al-Ahli Arab Hospital explosion, he tweeted, "Israeli Air Force struck a Hamas terrorist base inside a hospital in Gaza." He later deleted this tweet, after the Israeli government claimed a misfired Palestinian rocket was responsible for the explosion. There was controversy when it was not clear whether Naftali was actually authorised to speak on behalf of the Israeli government, or was in fact a Likudite.

In April 2025, fact-checking organization FakeReporter reported that Naftali was one of 30 prominent Twitter accounts promoting content from Gazawood, an Israeli Twitter account which attempts to discredit Palestinians by claiming they are exaggerating or faking their casualties.

== Personal life ==
Naftali has mentioned that he can speak basic Russian. He has on several occasions spoken at events organized by the Norwegian right wing microparty Conservative. which has been criticized for being pro-Kremlin and for promoting Russian propaganda.

He identifies as a follower of Jesus and with Messianic Judaism, a Protestant Christian movement that appropriates Jewish tradition with belief in Jesus as the Messiah. In an interview, he stated: "I am Jewish, but I follow the teachings of the New Testament as well. It is not my job to tell people what they should believe in." He has been accused of having proselytized during his army service, which he denies.

Naftali is married to India Naftali, an American journalist of Jewish and Indian descent.
