= Hanina of Sepphoris =

R. Hanina (or Hananiah) of Sepphoris (Hebrew: רבי חנניה דציפורין, read as Rabbi Hananiah DeTziporin; alternative Hebrew spelling: בי חנינא דציפורי) sometimes cited merely as R. Hanina [Hananiah] or Hanina (Hananiah) II, was an Amora of the Land of Israel (in Byzantine Galilee at the time), of the fifth generation of the Amora era.

== Biography ==
He was a disciple of Rabbi Mani II. He gradually rose to his master's level and discussed with him as a "fellow student" many halakhic questions. Eventually he moved to Sepphoris, where he became the religious head of the community; hence he is sometimes cited as Hanina of Sepphoris. When Mani also moved to Sepphoris (due to Roman persecutions in Tiberias), Hanina resigned the leadership in his favor—an act of self-abnegation extolled by the Rabbis as having few parallels. Hanina, however, did not long remain in Palestine. As the persecutions became general and intolerable, he emigrated to Babylonia, where Ashi frequently sought information from him. Hanina's family accompanied him, and were highly respected in their adopted country. There Hanina's daughter married the son of Ravina.
