= Hanan Jacoby =

American economist

Hanan G. Jacoby
- Born: 28 December 1962 (age 62)
- Occupation: American economist
- Website: https://www.worldbank.org/en/about/people/h/hanan-jacoby

Hanan G. Jacoby (born December 28, 1962) is an American economist and Lead Economist in the World Bank's Development Research Group.

== Biography ==
Hanan Jacoby received a B.A. in economics from the University of Washington in 1983, and an M.A. and Ph.D. in economics from the University of Chicago in 1985 and 1989. After his Ph.D., he taught at the University of Rochester as assistant professor from 1989 to 1996, during and after which he also held visiting appointments at Princeton, Penn, and IFPRI before joining the World Bank in 1998. Having joined the World Bank as economist, Jacoby was promoted later promoted to Senior and then Lead Economist of the World Bank's Development Economics Research Group. He is affiliated with the Bureau for Research in Economic Analysis of Development (BREAD) and either has or has had editorial duties at the World Bank Economic Review, Economic Development and Cultural Change, and the Journal of Development Economics.

== Research ==
Hanan Jacoby's research interests include agriculture, rural institutions and human capital. In January 2019, he ranked among the top 4% of economists registered on IDEAS/RePEc in terms of research output.

=== Research on education ===
- Jacoby, H.G. (1994). Borrowing constraints and progress through school: evidence from Peru. Review of Economics and Statistics, pp. 151–160.
- Glewwe, P., Jacoby, H. (1994). Student achievement and schooling choice in low-income countries: Evidence from Ghana. Journal of Human Resources, pp. 843–864.
- Glewwe, P., Jacoby, H. (1995). An economic analysis of delayed primary school enrollment and childhood malnutrition in a low income country. Review of Economics and Statistics, 77(1), pp. 156–69.
- Glewwe, P., Jacoby, H.G., King, E.M. (2001). Early childhood nutrition and academic achievement: a longitudinal analysis. Journal of Public Economics, 81(3), pp. 345–368.
- Jacoby, H.G. (2002). Is there an intrahousehold 'flypaper effect'? Evidence from a school feeding programme. Economic Journal, 112(476), pp. 196–221.
- Glewwe, P., Jacoby, H.G. (2004). Economic growth and the demand for education: Is there a wealth effect? Journal of Development Economics, 74(1), pp. 33–51.

=== Research on land rights and transportation ===
- Jacoby, H.G. (2000). Access to markets and the benefits of rural roads. Economic Journal, 110(465), pp. 713–737.
- Jacoby, H.G., Li, G., Rozelle, S. (2002). Hazards of expropriation: tenure insecurity and investment in rural China. American Economic Review, 92(5), pp. 1420–1447.
- Jacoby, H.G., Minten, B. (2007). Is land titling in Sub-Saharan Africa cost-effective? Evidence from Madagascar. World Bank Economic Review, 21(3), pp. 461–485.
- Jacoby, H.G., Minten, B. (2008). On Measuring the Benefits of Lower Transport Costs. Washington, D.C.: World Bank Publications.

=== Other research ===
- Jacoby, H.G. (1991). Productivity of men and women and the sexual division of labor in peasant agriculture of the Peruvian Sierra. Journal of Development Economics, 37(1–2), pp. 265–287.
- Jacoby, H.G. (1993). Shadow wages and peasant family labour supply: an econometric application to the Peruvian Sierra. Review of Economic Studies, 60(4), pp. 903–921.
- Jacoby, H.G. (1995). The economics of polygyny in Sub-Saharan Africa: Female productivity and the demand for wives in Côte d'Ivoire. Journal of Political Economy, 103(5), pp. 938-971.
- Jacoby, H.G., Skoufias, E. (1997). Risk, financial markets, and human capital in a developing country. Review of Economic Studies, 64(3), pp. 311-?.
