= Hanan the Egyptian =

2nd century rabbi

Hanan the Egyptian (Hebrew: חנן המצרי, translit: Hanan ha-Mitzri) was a rabbi of the 2nd century (third generation of tannaim) who first lived at Alexandria. He later moved to Judaea and was active among the scholars of Jabneh. He was a disciple of Rabbi Akiva and is quoted among "those who argued before the sages." Only one law, relating to the Temple service on Yom Kippur, is preserved in his name.

Another sage bearing the same name, also known as Hanan ben Abishalom, presided as a civil court judge in Jerusalem during Temple times. He was active a few generations earlier. Several of his decisions have been preserved.
