= Hanina of Sura =

Babylonian Amora of the fifth generation

Rav Hanina of Sura (Hebrew: רב חנינא מסורא) was a Babylonian Amora of the fifth generation.

Like other Babylonian rabbis, his title was "Rav", but this is sometimes written in error as "Rabbi".

== Biography ==
His mother was a "rebellious wife" who refused to sleep with her husband and desired a divorce. Yet Mar Zutra, the judge, compelled them to remain together, and Hanina was born. However, the Talmud recommends against forcing the couple to remain together in this way as a general policy.

He was a colleague of Mar Zutra, Rav Man, and Rav Papi. His rulings are quoted in a number of places in the Babylonian Talmud.
