= Hanan (surname) =

Hanan is a surname of Semitic origin. Notable people with the surname include:

- Elizabeth Hanan (1937–2024), New Zealand local politician
- Harry Hanan (1916–1982), British cartoonist
- Josiah Hanan (1868–1954), New Zealand politician
- Maurice Hanan, the namesake of the Hanan grid, a geometrical construction
- Peter Hanan (1915–2008), New Zealand swimmer
- Ralph Hanan (1909–1969), New Zealand politician, nephew of Josiah
- Stephen Mo Hanan, American actor and performance artist
