= Nidal =

Nidal (in Arabic نضال meaning warrior in Arabic) is a unisex given name and surname of Arabic origin. Notable people with the name include:

== Given name ==
- Nidal Al Achkar (born 1941), Lebanese actress
- Nidal Algafari (born 1965), Bulgaria-based director
- Nidal Asmar (born 1969), Lebanese-born Australian sport shooter
- Nidal A. Ayyad (born 1968), one of the convicted perpetrators of 1993 World Trade Center bombing
- Nidal Baba (born 1972), U.S. football (soccer) player / midfielder
- Nidal Bchiri (born 1991), Dutch-Moroccan kickboxer
- Nidal Čelik (born 2006), Bosnian footballer
- Nidal Fat'hi Rabah Farahat (1971–2003), creator of the Qassam rocket
- Nidal Haddad (born 1959), Syrian boxer
- Nidal Malik Hasan (born 1970), former US Army major who perpetrated the 2009 Fort Hood shooting
- Nidal Hilal (born 1958), British academic and engineer
- Nidal Jaafari (died 2017), Palestinian military border guard, killed by an ISIS attack on Rafah crossing
- Nidal Mourad (born 1988), Canadian musician and producer
- Nidal Al Tunaiji, Emirati academic and politician
- Nidal Yehya, Lebanese diplomat
- Mohammad Nidal al-Shaar (born 1956), Syrian politician and government minister

== Surname ==
- Abou Nidal (born 1974), Côte d'Ivoirian singer
- Abu Nidal (1937–2002), founder of the militant Palestinian splinter group Fatah – The Revolutionary Council
- Umm Nidal (1948–2013), Palestinian politician
