= Sakar-20 =

The Sakar-20 is a Russian-made 122mm surface-to-surface missile. It is approximately 2 meters in length with a range of approximately 30 kilometers and the capacity to devastate an area of about 100 square meters. There are reports of Pakistani-supplied Sakar-20s being used by the Taliban against United States military, NATO and Afghan positions along the border with Pakistan.

== See also ==
- Qassam rocket
- Katyusha
