= Wissam Farhat =

Hamas militant (1974–2023)

Personal details
- Born: 1974
- Died: 2 December 2023 (aged 48–49)
- Manner of death: Assassination by airstrike
- Party: Hamas
- Relations: Nidal, Muhammad, and Rawad (brothers, all deceased)
- Parent: Umm Nidal (mother)
- Occupation: Head of Hamas's Shejaiya Battalion

Military service
- Battles/wars: 2014 Gaza War; Battle of Shuja'iyya (2014); Gaza war; October 7 attacks; Nahal Oz attack; Shuja'iyya ambush; Battle of Shuja'iyya (2023) X

Wissam Abu Hussein Farhat (Arabic: وسام أبو حسين فرحات, romanized: Wisām Abū Ḥusayn Faraḥāt; 1974 – 2 December 2023) was a Palestinian militant who was the head of Hamas's Shejaiya Battalion. He was the mastermind behind various attacks such as the Atzmona Attack, the Nahal Oz attack and more.

== Biography ==
Wissam Farhat was born in 1974 to Umm Nidal. Three of his brothers -- Nidal, Muhammad, and Rawad were killed for their Hamas activities.

Farhat was arrested on 20 March 1995 on charges of transporting 6 bags of explosives into Israel, which Israel alleged was an attempt to carry out a suicide bombing in Israel. He spent almost 11 years in Israeli prison, including 2 years in Ashkelon, 6 years in Nafha, and 2 and a half years in Hadarim. He was released from Israeli prison in November 2005, three weeks after his brother Rawad was killed by Israel.

While in prison, Farhat learned of his younger brother Muhammad's participation in the Atzmona attack, in which Muhammad killed 5 Israeli civilians and wounded 12 others. Their other brother Nidal was previously killed.

== Death ==
On 2 December 2023, the Israel Defense Forces (IDF) killed Farhat in an airstrike during the Gaza war. The IDF identified Farhat as the commander of Hamas's Shejaiya battalion responsible leading the Nahal Oz attack during the October 7 attacks and for an incident during the Battle of Shuja'iyya in 2014 in which 7 IDF soldiers were killed, including Oron Shaul.

On 8 December 2023, the military wing of Hamas, Al-Qassam Brigades, published a video showing footage of close-range battles in Shuja'iyya that resulted in the destruction of an IDF tank, and a Qassam militant is heard shouting "for your sake, Abu Hussein!" referring to Farhat.

== See also ==
- Casualties of the Gaza war
