= Yoav Keren =

Israeli journalist and literary editor

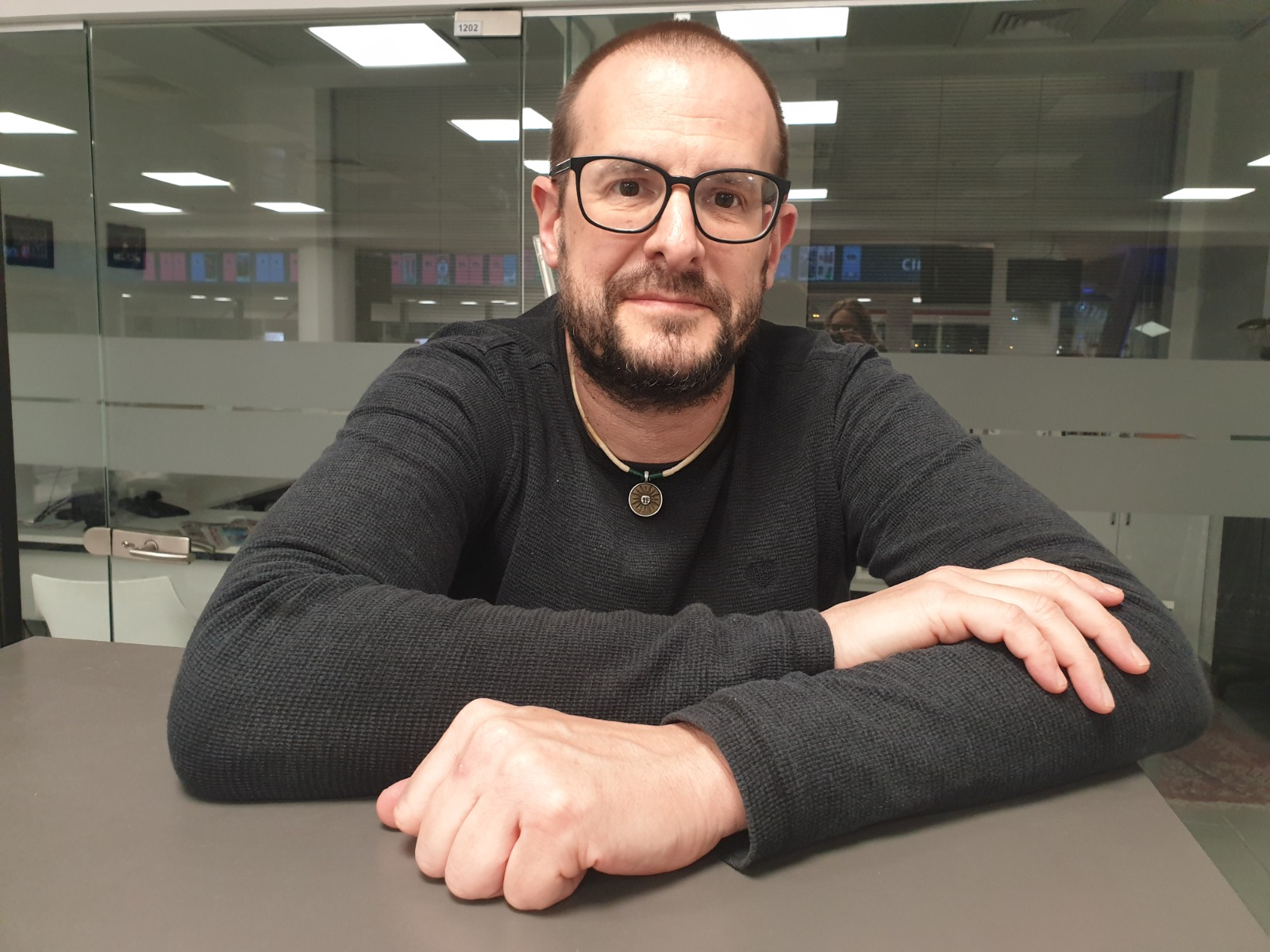
- Keren in 2021
- Born: July 6, 1972 (age 54); Haifa, Israel

Yoav Keren (born 6 July 1972) is an Israeli journalist, literary editor, and author.

== Biography ==
Keren was born in Haifa. He studied at the Reali School and the military boarding school for command in Haifa. In 1990, he enlisted in the Israel Defense Forces (IDF), volunteered for the paratroopers, and was assigned to Battalion 890. He underwent combat training and an infantry commanders' course, and participated in operational activities in South Lebanon. He later completed an officers' course and served in staff and training positions. During his reserve service, he was promoted to the rank of major. Keren holds a bachelor's degree in humanities from Bar-Ilan University.

=== Journalistic career ===
In 2000, Keren began working as an editor at Yedioth Ahronoth's local news network. In 2002, he joined Maariv as a news desk editor and deputy editor of the political supplement. At the same time, he contributed opinion articles and reports.

In 2006, to mark 50 years since Operation Kadesh, Keren participated in a parachute jump organized by the IDF as a journalist for Maariv, alongside paratroopers who had jumped at Mitla Pass. In 2008, he returned to Yedioth Ahronoth as a news desk editor, front-page editor, and editor of the Sabbath supplement. He also edited holiday supplements and special projects. At Yedioth Ahronoth, he published opinion pieces and feature reports, primarily on military affairs and international travel. His notable stories included a roots trip to the Philippines with an Israeli soldier of Filipino–Thai heritage, a visit to the Jewish community and Shaar Hashamayim synagogue in Cairo, a two-week journey along IDF positions from the Lebanon border to the Egypt border with photographer Gadi Kabalo, a visit to the Falashmura transit camp in Gondar, Ethiopia, with journalist Danny Adino Ababa, and a report on the Jewish town of Qırmızı Qəsəbə in Azerbaijan. One of his opinion articles received more than 1.7 million views and thousands of comments on Yedioth Ahronoth's Facebook page.

In 2022, Keren reported on the Russian invasion of Ukraine with press photographer Amit Shaabi. While in Odesa and Mykolaiv, near the frontline, they published a series of reports in Yedioth Ahronoth and on Ynet.

In September 2023, ahead of the 50th anniversary of the Yom Kippur War, Yedioth Ahronoth released a special supplement on wartime letters, edited by journalist Lior Ben-Ami. Keren contributed extensively, conducting interviews with more than 20 soldiers and bereaved family members, and authoring around ten feature articles, some of which were also published on Ynet.

During the Israel–Hamas War, Keren published a series of field reports in Yedioth Ahronoth and on Ynet about IDF units, nearby communities, and Israeli casualties during the ground offensive in the Gaza Strip. Together with photographer Gil Yohanan, he embedded with Israeli forces in Shuja'iyya, Gaza, and documented a battle with Palestinian militants.

=== Literary career ===
Keren's first book, The Gatekeeper's Daughter, was published in 2010 by Yedioth Books. In later years, his short stories appeared in various literary journals and anthologies, and he participated in public readings.

His published works include:

- "The Dream Cores," Moznaim, October 2021.
- "The Tender," Motiv, August 2021.
- "Who Remembers the Name of Bar Kokhba's Deputy?", Motiv, June 2021.
- "With Us in the Studio," second prize in the "Harvest Challenge" by Afik Literature, Reading Creates, and Page: A Stage for Independent Creation.
- "Letter from the Free State of Florentin," first prize in the "Dark Room Challenge" by the Page website.
- "From Moshe Dayan to Moshe Selekter," in When We Were Children, Saar Publishing.
- "Butterfly," in A Story All Good, Sipur Chozer Network and Orion Publishing.

He has read his works at various venues, including:

- Bar Giora in Tel Aviv, as part of the literary project Shorts.
- "Stories from Life" events at Cafe Yudfat, hosted by Eshkol Nevo and Orit Gidali.
- The radio program Land of Golan by Shani Hader.
- An event of the Hebrew Writers Association, dedicated to the theme of freedom, edited by poet Shuki Gutman.

Additional publications include:

- "The Organization," Slont, November 2021.
- "Pursued," Between Purple and Sky Blue, issue 18, December 2021.
- "Class Reunion," in the International Inspiration Day 2022 anthology, edited by Orit Merlin-Rosenzweig.
- The poems "Room" and "Spring in Mykolaiv," in issues of Deferred Salon edited by poets Yehi Levi and Shani Arnehaim.
- "Transparent," Between Purple and Sky Blue, issue 20, September 2022.
- "Smooth Wall," "A.A.A. Cleaning Services and Special Tasks," and "Where Has Lawyer Pinchas Smokler Disappeared To?", in Old Age Home, Motiv Publishing, February 2023.
- "Letter from the Free State of Florentin," in Tikkun Gathering, edited by Ilan Sheinfeld, also translated into English for distribution in the United States ahead of Prime Minister Benjamin Netanyahu's September 2023 visit.

Keren is currently working on his second book.

== Books ==
=== Authored ===
- The Gatekeeper's Daughter. Yedioth Books, 2010.

=== Edited ===
Keren has edited a wide range of works, including biographies, military accounts, and illuminated manuscripts, many of which were published by Yedioth Books. Several of these became bestsellers, such as For Your Eyes Only by Shimon Shiffer, From Zero to One Hundred: The Story of a Team in Unit 669 by Guy M., A Psychiatrist on the Couch by Ilan Rabinovich, and The Journey is Not Over by Danny Adino Ababa.

Selected edited works:

- Yehuda Weinstein, The Advisor. Yedioth Books, 2022.
- Eliezer Shkedi, Why Who Is Michael. Yedioth Books, 2021.
- Shimon Shiffer, For Your Eyes Only – Secrets, Leaks, and Exposures. Yedioth Books, 2021.
- Avner Shor and Aviram Levi, Sayeret Matkal – The Unit's Major Operations. Yedioth Books, 2020.
- Shimon Sheves, Friend. Yedioth Books, 2020.
- Shimon Shiffer, The Warner – Conversations with General Amos Gilad. Yedioth Books, 2019.
- Guy M., From Zero to One Hundred – The Story of a Team in Unit 669. Yedioth Books, 2019.
- Danny Adino Ababa, The Journey Is Not Over. Yedioth Books, 2019.
- Arieh Meliniak (with Rami Rotholz), Winning Is a Profession. Tafar Publishing, 2018.
- Moshe (Bogie) Ya'alon (with Anat Shinkman), A Long Short Road. Yedioth Books, 2018.
- Ilan Rabinovich, A Psychiatrist on the Couch. Yedioth Books, 2017.
- Yair Lapid, Journey to the Future – A Look at the Future of Israeli Society. Yedioth Books, 2017.
- Yoaz Hendel, In an Unplowed Land – An Israeli Journey. Yedioth Books, 2015.
- Amir Rapaport, Fire on Our Forces – How We Failed Ourselves in the Second Lebanon War. Maariv Library, 2007.
- Omri Ginzburg, That One Out There. Self-published, 2021.

== Personal life ==
Keren is married to Tali, and they have two daughters. The family resides in Holon.
