= Umm Nidal =

Palestinian activist (1949–2013)

Maryam Mohammad Farhat
- Born: 24 December 1949; Shuja'iyya, Gaza City, Gaza Strip, Palestine
- Died: 17 March 2013 (aged 63); Gaza City, Gaza Strip, Palestinian territories
- Other name: Umm Nidal
- Occupation: Politician
- Known for: Being the "Mother of Martyrs"
- Children: 10, including Nidal Farhat and Wissam Farhat

Maryam Mohammad Yousif Farhat (Arabic: مريم محمد يوسف فرحات), or Mariam Farahat (24 December 1949 – 17 March 2013), more commonly known as Umm Nidal (Arabic: أم نضال) was a Palestinian activist known by Palestinians as the "Mother of Martyrs" for her support for her sons' involvement in attacks against Israel. Three of her sons were members of al-Qassam Brigades, who conducted or participated in the organisation of attacks against Israeli civilian and/or military targets and were killed by Israeli forces, while she was still alive. Two more sons, who were also members of al-Qassam, were killed in the Gaza war more than a decade after her death.

Farhat was a close associate of the Hamas leadership for over two decades. She had strong militant credentials, including an appearance carrying a gun in a video in which she advised one of her sons, Mohammed, on tactics before he attacked a Jewish settlement. She also was a member of the Palestinian Legislative Council for Hamas. Farhat was one of the most prominent Islamist female leaders in Gaza and became an icon of the Second Intifada.

== Early life and family ==
Umm Nidal, born Maryam Farhat, was born in Shuja'iyya in Gaza City in 1949. She had ten brothers and five sisters, and married Fathi Farhat when she was in high school, becoming pregnant with her first child shortly after marriage.

Farhat had a total of ten children, and her six sons joined al-Qassam Brigades, Hamas's military wing. Her eldest son Nidal was one of the first manufacturers of the Qassam rocket and helped to make rockets for Hamas and was killed in February 2003 while preparing to conduct an attack. A third son Rawad died in 2005 in an Israeli airstrike on his car, which was carrying a Qassam rocket. Her son Wissam served eleven years in Israeli prison for attempted murder. After that, he was the perpetrator of various terrorist acts such as the Atzmona and the Nahal Oz attacks. Him and his brother Moamin, a Hamas commander, were killed by the Israel Defense Forces in December 2023 and September 2025, respectively, during the Gaza war.

== Public attention ==
Farhat came to public attention in 2002 after being filmed carrying a gun and advising her 17-year-old son Muhammad Farhat before the Atzmona attack on 7 March. Muhammad entered the Gaza Strip former settlement of Atzmona and opened fire and threw hand grenades at Israeli students enrolled in a pre-military school, killing five and wounding 23 others. After the attack, he was shot dead. After Muhammad's death, Farhat said she "wished [she] had 100 boys like Muhammad."

Farhat became known as "Khansa of Palestine" (Arabic: خنساء فلسطين), a reference to Al-Khansa (one of the companions of Muhammad), all four of whose sons were killed in the Battle of Qadisiyah. Umm Nidal got this title because of her great sacrifices - as in the Palestinian and Islamic culture - during the Second Intifada and before that, where her house was home to many prominent leaders of al-Qassam, including Emad Akel, who was assassinated in her home in 1993 by the Israel Defense Forces.

== Political career ==
Farhat ran as a candidate of Hamas in the 2006 Palestinian legislative election. She was successfully elected to the Palestinian Legislative Council.

== Views on martyrdom and murder of civilians ==
In an interview published in both the Israeli Arab weekly Kul al-Arab and the London-based Arabic-language daily Al-Quds Al-Arabi, Umm Nidal said she was proud of her sons. In her December 2005 interview, Umm Nidal said:

- "I protect my sons from defying Allah, or from choosing a path that would not please Allah. This is what I fear, when it comes to my sons. But as for sacrifice, Jihad for the sake of Allah, or performing the duty they were charged with - this makes me happy."
- (Referring to Israelis) "They are all occupiers. Besides, don't forget that they all serve in the army. They are all considered soldiers. They are all reserve soldiers."
- "They are all occupiers, and we must fight them by any legitimate means."
- "All means are legitimate as long as the occupation continues."
- "There is no difference. This is Islamic religious law. I don't invent anything. I follow Islamic religious law in this. A Muslim is very careful not to kill an innocent person, because he knows he would be destined to eternal Hell. So the issue is not at all simple. We rely on Islamic religious law when we say there is no prohibition on killing these people."
- "The word 'peace' does not mean the kind of peace we are experiencing. This peace is, in fact, surrender and a shameful disgrace. Peace means the liberation of all of Palestine, from the Jordan River to the Mediterranean Sea. When this is accomplished - if they want peace, we will be ready. They may live under the banner of the Islamic state. That is the future of Palestine that we are striving towards."

== Death ==
Farhat died on 17 March 2013, aged 64, from multiple organ failure, in Gaza City. Her death was announced by al-Qassam Brigades. Her funeral was attended by 4,000 Palestinians, including top Hamas leaders such as Ismail Haniyeh.
