= Nidal Farahat =

Palestinian militant (1972–2003)

Nidal Fat’hi Rabah Farahat (Arabic: نضال فتحي رباح فرحات, romanized: Niḍāl Fatḥī Rabāḥ Faraḥāt; 8 April 1971 – 16 February 2003) created the Qassam rocket, a homemade weapon produced by Izz ad-Din al-Qassam Brigades.

After the First Intifada, Farahat was arrested following the death of senior Hamas militant Imad Aqel. After spending three years in Israeli detention, he returned to Gaza.

At the beginning of Al-Aqsa Intifada, in 2000, Farahat officially joined the Izz ad-Din al-Qassam Brigades and soon became an active member in the organization, planning and carrying out numerous operations including mortar attacks on Jewish settlements in the Gaza Strip.

Farhat and Tito Masoud manufactured the first Qassam rocket, with a 2,500m range, in June 2001. The rocket was first deployed on 26 October 2001, when the Izz ad-Din al-Qassam Brigades claimed credit for launching one from the Gaza Strip into the Israeli city of Sderot. This development in rocket manufacturing and development was a turning point in the war between Palestinian armed factions and Israel.

In 2001, Farahat, after several months of work, produced the first prototype for the Qassam rocket and presented it to Izz ad-Din al-Qassam Brigades leaders Salah Shahade and Adnan al-Ghoul. Together with al-Ghoul, Farahat then worked on developing a better version of the Qassam, the "Qassam 2". Hamas militants used the Qassam 2 extensively after 2002 to attack nearby Israeli settlements and towns. Up to the beginning of 2005, the Qassam rockets were responsible for the death of 6 Israelis, all but one in the Israeli town of Sderot near the Gaza Strip, from which several hundreds of rockets were fired over a period of three years.

Farahat also worked as a bombmaker, supplying Izz ad-Din al-Qassam Brigades militants with explosive devices and homemade rocket launchers like the Al-Bana and the Batar. He also worked, under the direction of Salama Hamad, on the conception of a drone that could fly over Israeli towns and cities and bomb them. On 16 February 2003, Farahat was working along with other militants around newly acquired parts of the drone when one of them, booby-trapped, exploded. The device killed Farahat and 5 other militants.

The youngest brother of Nidal Farahat, Mohammed, died on 7 March 2002, when he attacked a military academy in the Israeli settlement of Azmona, killing 5 young settlers. Farwad Farahat, another of his brothers, was killed in an IDF airstrike on his car south of Gaza City on his way to launch rockets at Israel in 2005. His three other brothers are alive, with one in prison since 1992 and the two others, Wissam Farhat and Momen Farahat, lived in the Gaza Strip where they assume high-ranking functions in the Izz ad-Din al-Qassam Brigades. The latter sustained serious injuries to a hand while fighting against Israeli soldiers during an incursion in Gaza City in 2003. Finally, Nidal's mother, Maryam Farahat, nicknamed Um Nidal, was elected in the Palestinian parliament dominated by Hamas following the 26 January 2006 Palestinian legislative election. Wissam Farahat was later killed in an IDF airstrike on 2 December 2023 during Gaza war. His last surviving brother, Moamen Farhat, was killed in an airstrike with his family in September 2025.
