= Mohammed Dababish =

Palestinian senior intelligence official in Hamas (died 2023)

Mohammed Khamis Dababish, also spelled Mohammed Dababesh (Arabic: محمد دبابش), also known as Abu-Ridwan (أبو رضوان), from at least 2010 and until 2019, headed the General Security Service, the Palestinian Hamas's internal security service in the Gaza Strip. Israel states that Dababish was killed in Gaza on 13 November 2023 during the Gaza war.

== Biography ==
Dababish was head of Hamas's internal security service (General Security Service) by 2010. Egyptian authorities arrested Dababish upon his arrival at Cairo International Airport on 16 September 2010. Egypt claimed Dababish was returning to Gaza via Cairo, Egypt, after visiting Hamas's headquarters in Damascus, Syria, to devise a plan to smuggle weapons into Gaza. However, Hamas and Dababish's relatives insisted he was returning from pilgrimage in Saudi Arabia. Egypt said Dababish was detained for attempting to smuggling sophisticated telecommunications equipment interdicted by the Egyptian authorities bound for Gaza.

Dababish's arrest was one of several Egyptian detentions of Hamas officials after Hamas killed Egyptian soldier Ahmad Sha'ban in a border shooting in 2010. Egypt charged Dababish had recommended to Hamas interior minister Fathi Hamad not to release the names of two Hamas members allegedly responsible for Sha'ban's killing. Egypt also blamed Hamas for rocket attacks on Aqaba, Jordan, that killed one person and wounded four.

In response to the arrest, Hamas spokesman Fawzi Barhum claimed the arrest was an "extremely dangerous" move by Egypt. Ynet News reported that after Dababish's arrest, Hamas immediately moved Gilad Shalit, the Israeli soldier the group held captive. According to Egypt, Dababish was one of few Hamas officials who knew Shalit's location. While under interrogation, Dababish apparently revealed plans for Palestinian rocket attacks from Sinai targeting Israel. Dababish was released on 24 September and deported to Gaza via the Rafah crossing.

In July 2019, he resigned as director of military intelligence to become the Dean of Military Colleges for Al-Qassam Brigades, Hamas's military wing.

As a member of the Hamas Political Bureau, Dababish met with the leadership of the Popular Front for the Liberation of Palestine-General Command in Gaza.

The Israeli government said that a joint IDF and Shin Bet operation in Gaza on 13 November 2023 during the Gaza war killed Dababish, whom Israel described as Hamas's former director of military intelligence. According to Israel, Dababish was involved in the Atzmona attack, a 2002 terror attack in which five Israelis were killed.

== See also ==
- Casualties of the 2023 Israel–Hamas war
