= Walid Hamdiya =

Palestinian spy for Israel (1963–2004)

Walid Radi Ibrahim Hamdiya
- Born: وليد حمدية; August 30, 1963; Shuja'iyya, Gaza City
- Died: 2 August 2004 (aged 40); Gaza City
- Cause of death: Assassination
- Occupations: Senior member of Hamas, Spy for Israel
- Known for: Spying for Israel, Assassination by Hamas
- Criminal charge: Collaboration with Israel
- Criminal penalty: Death sentence (firing squad)
- Criminal status: Executed
- Espionage activity
- Country: Israel (worked for)
- Allegiance: Israel (as a spy)
- Agency: Shin Bet
- Service years: 1987–1995 (period of collaboration)
- Rank: Senior member of Hamas
- Key operations: Assisted in the deaths of several Hamas leaders
- Other work: Hamas military member

Walid Radi Ibrahim Hamdiya (Arabic: وليد حمدية; 1963–August 2, 2004) was a senior member of Palestinian militant group Hamas. During the 1980s and 1990s, information he supplied to Israel reportedly enabled the Israel Defense Forces to kill several senior Hamas members, including Emad Akel. He was considered by Palestinian security officials to be one of the most senior Palestinian spies for Israel ever discovered. Hamdiya was assassinated in his hospital bed during a Hamas operation at the Shifa Hospital in Gaza City on August 2, 2004.

== Spying for Israel ==
Hamdiya was a senior leader of Hamas. In 1995, Hamas arrested Hamdiya for allegedly providing information to Israel that led to the 1993 death of militant leader Emad Akel and four other senior Hamas military leaders. He was considered one of the most important and senior captured spies employed by Israel.

In detention, he reportedly confessed to helping Israel locate and kill at least 5 Hamas members between 1987 and 1995. After a 1-day trial condemned by human rights groups such as Amnesty International, Hamdiya was convicted on October 17, 2002, and sentenced to death by firing squad.

== Assassination ==
On Monday, August 2, 2004, a policeman at Gaza Central Jail threw grenades into a prison cell holding accused collaborators with Israel. Later that day, masked gunmen entered the Shifa Hospital in Gaza City and shot to death Hamdiya and another accused spy. Hamdiya was in his bed in the intensive care unit. Hamas claimed responsibility for the operation. Human Rights Watch condemned the operation at the hospital as a violation of international humanitarian law.
