= Deaths of Oron Shaul and Hadar Goldin =

Incident during the 2014 Gaza War

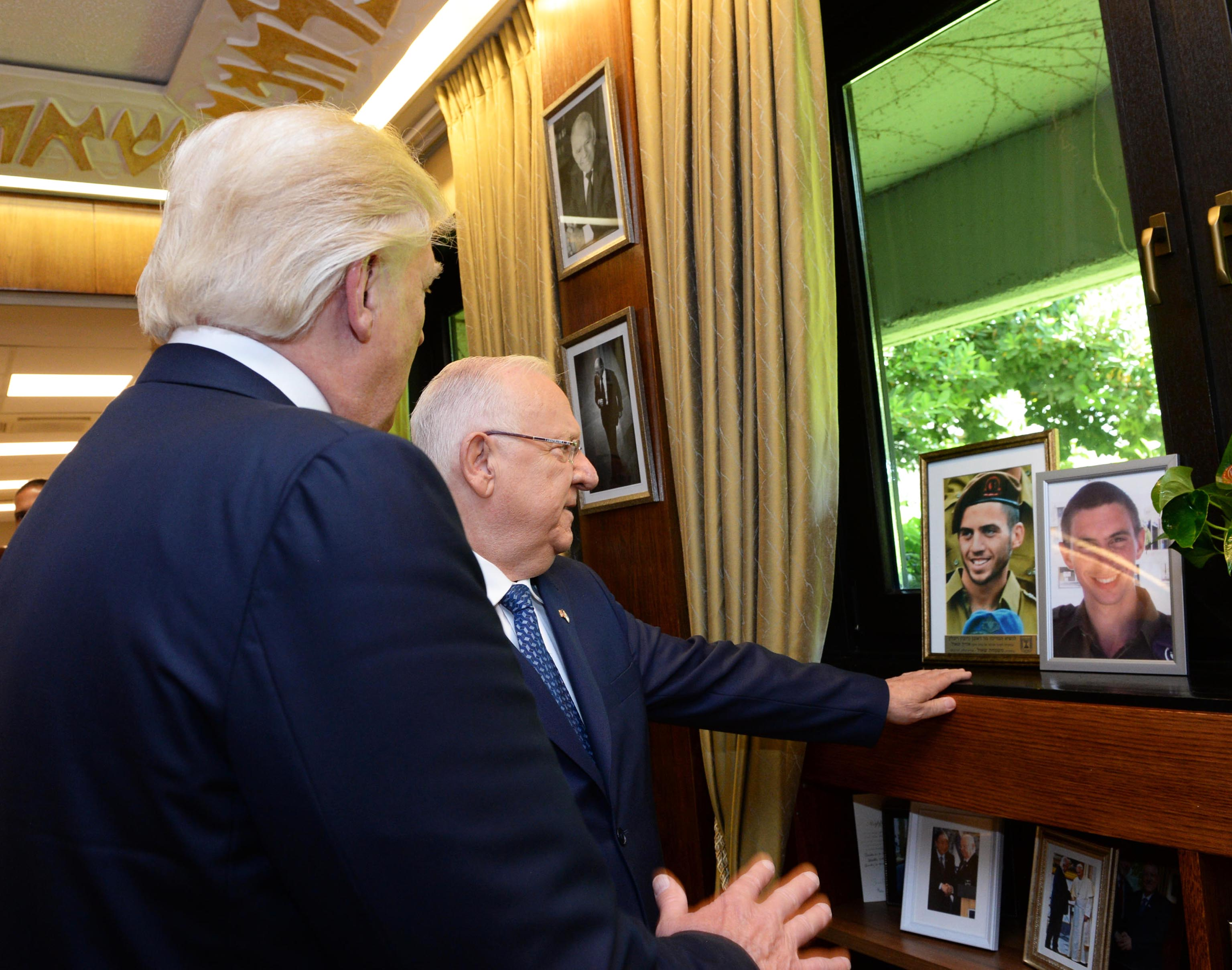
Israeli President Reuven Rivlin showing American President Donald Trump photos of Oron Shaul (left) and Hadar Goldin (right) in 2017.

During the 2014 Gaza War, Hamas captured Israel Defense Forces (IDF) soldiers Oron Shaul (Hebrew: אורון שאול) and Hadar Goldin (Hebrew: הדר גולדין), and held their bodies captive. Since their capture, there were efforts by the Israeli government and activists to secure their release. Shaul's body was recovered from the Gaza Strip by Israeli forces in January 2025, and Goldin's body was returned by Hamas later that year.

On July 21, 2014, Hamas announced it had captured IDF soldier Oron Shaul during the Battle of Shuja'iyya. Initially Israel denied the capture, but later acknowledged it. Shaul was presumed by Israel to be dead, and there were negotiations between Israel and Hamas to exchange his body for Palestinian prisoners in Israel. On August 1, Hamas captured Hadar Goldin near Rafah. He is believed to have died before his body was taken away by Hamas.

On January 19, 2025, during the Gaza war, Shaul's body was retrieved from the Gaza Strip and returned to Israel. On November 9, 2025, Goldin's body was returned by Hamas as part of the Gaza peace plan.

== Oron Shaul ==
Oron Shaul
- אורון שאול
- Born: December 27, 1993; Israel
- Died: July 20, 2014 (aged 20); Shuja'iyya, Gaza Strip, Palestine
- Body discovered: January 18, 2025
- Resting place: Poria Illit, Israel
- Occupation: Soldier

During the Battle of Shuja'iyya on July 20, 2014, Hamas fired an anti-tank missile at an IDF armored personnel carrier carrying seven soldiers, including Oron Shaul. Hamas rapidly claimed to have captured an IDF soldier named Aron Shaul, backing up its claim with the soldier's "photo ID and credentials". On July 21, Ron Prosor, Israel’s ambassador to the UN, denied the capture, saying "There is no kidnapped Israeli soldier and those rumors are untrue".

The IDF later confirmed that the body of Oron Shaul had not been identified among the dead found inside the vehicle. Shaul's fate was the focus of great concern during the short period when it was feared that he had been taken captive, because, according to the Associated Press, "In the past, Israel has paid a heavy price in lopsided prisoner swaps to retrieve captured soldiers or remains held by its enemies." According to The New York Times, "Hamas has recognized the pull such incidents have over the Israeli psyche and clearly has moved to grab hostages.

The claim that an Israeli soldier had been captured, "touched off celebrations among Palestinians in both Gaza and the West Bank", according to The Independent, which ran photos of Palestinians cheering in the streets of Ramallah. According to The New York Times, "Celebrations immediately broke out in Gaza and the West Bank."

Hamas television celebrated the purported kidnapping with a victory mocking the IDF and celebrating the hostage-taking in song: "We've taken a second Shalit, a young, blond-haired boy."

By July 22, spokesmen for Israel questioned the claim of capture. On July 25, Israel confirmed that Shaul was killed in action.

== Hadar Goldin ==
Hadar Goldin
- הדר גולדין
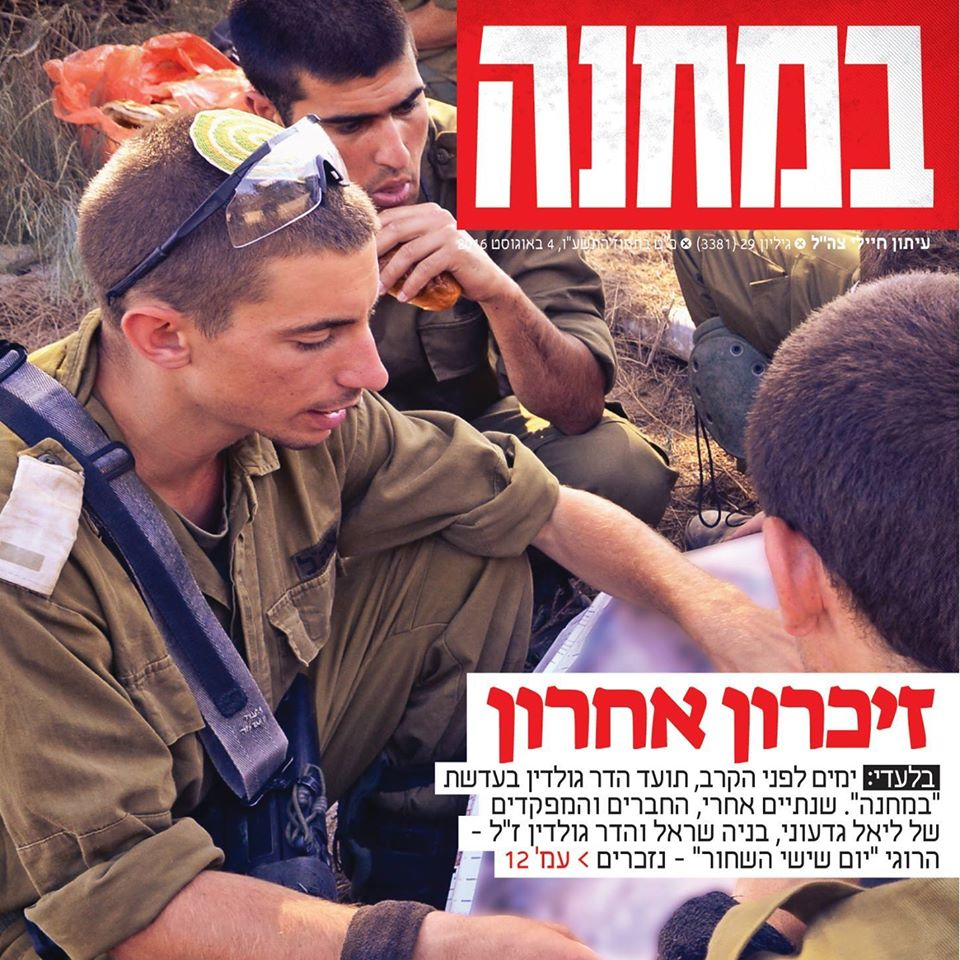
- August 4, 2016 cover of Bamahane, marking the two year anniversary of Goldin's disappearance
- Born: February 18, 1991; Israel
- Died: August 1, 2014 (aged 23); Rafah, Palestine
- Body discovered: November 9, 2025
- Resting place: Kfar Saba, Israel

On 1 August during the 2014 Gaza War, Givati Brigade Lieutenant Hadar Goldin reportedly was taking part in an operation to decommission a tunnel belonging to militants. Hamas militants reportedly emerged from a tunnel and attacked an Israeli patrol in Rafah. Killing two Israeli soldiers, the militants returned to Rafah through a tunnel, bringing the body of Goldin with them.

The incident occurred during a 72-hour cease-fire that had been announced by UN Secretary General Ban Ki-moon and John Kerry the day before. According to the AP the terms of the truce allowed for the continued destruction of the tunnels that were behind Israeli defensive lines and lead into Israel. The Al-Qassam Brigades alleged that the IDF had broken the truce by beginning an incursion, while the IDF claimed Hamas had broken the cease-fire.

Israel at first believed that the militants had abducted Goldin and were holding him, but later determined that he had also been killed. The IDF Rabbinate later declared Goldin deceased for the purposes of Jewish burial and grieving rituals and buried the remains.

== Efforts to return the soldiers' bodies ==
On August 11, 2014 Israeli Minister of Defense Moshe Ya'alon visited the Shaul family to inform them that the government was making every effort to retrieve their son's body from Hamas.

There was coverage of the request for Hamas to return the bodies of Shaul and Goldin in international media through the late summer and early fall of 2014. Ongoing negotiations for the exchange of Palestinian prisoners held in Israel for the bodies of the two men were the focus of international press coverage in late 2014.

The question of whether Israel should release convicted Palestinian militants in exchange for Hamas' agreement to return the bodies of the two dead soldiers ignited a heated political debate within Israel. Apparently referring to the two bodies, Hamas official Mushir al-Masri boasted that "Hamas has bargaining chips that forced Israel to succumb to Palestinian demands. The indirect negotiations mediated by the Egyptians may in the future lead to a new prisoner swap deal in which many Palestinian prisoners are freed." on his Facebook page.

In September 2017 a gallery show of works by Goldin was put on in Brooklyn, New York, to both bring attention to Goldin's fate and celebrate his life and artistic talents.

In 2018, Goldin's father was reportedly told by politicians that the prisoners released in the Gilad Shalit prisoner exchange who were later rearrested would serve as bargaining chips for his sons body. Later in 2018, he said that Netanyahu had repeatedly promised the family that there would be no arrangement in Gaza without the return of Goldin and Shaul's bodies.

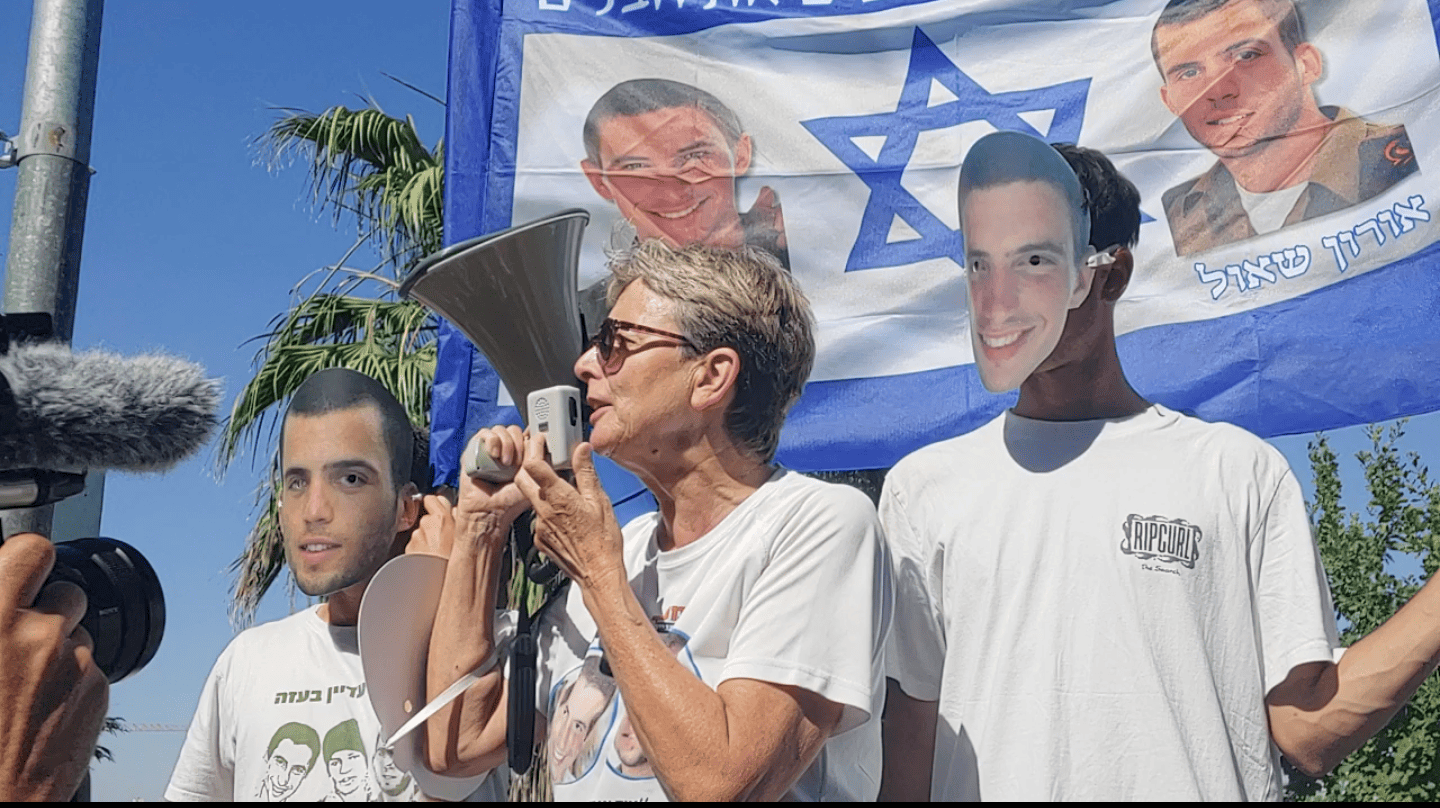
Goldin's mother at a 2023 demonstration calling for the return of his body

During the Gaza War that began after the 7 October 2023 attacks the status of Shaul and Goldin was brought to the forefront, especially during the ceasefires and hostage exchanges. Shortly after the attacks, the Goldin family had partnered with Psagot, a PTSD treatment organization, and over 600 people had contacted them for support and information helping lead to the creation of the Hostages and Missing Families Forum. However, the families of Shaul and Goldin had to fight for their sons and those previously captured by Hamas to be included on the IDFs official count of hostages.

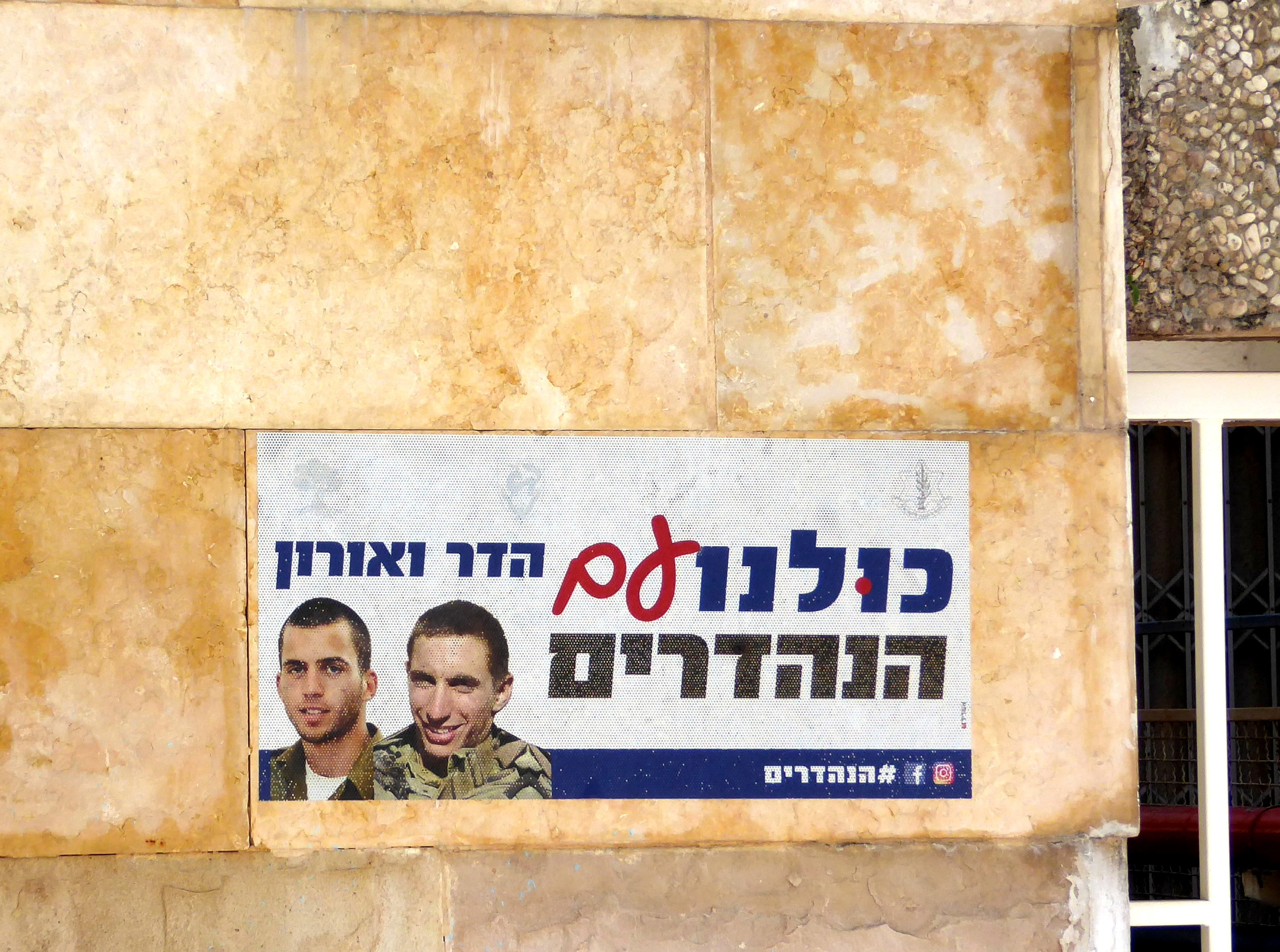
A bumber sticker promoting the cause of returning the bodies of Goldin and Shaul. Translation of sticker's text: We are all with the wonderful Hadar and Oron ("the wonderful" is a homonym of the word "the missing").

In July 2023, the families of Shaul, Goldin, Avera Mengistu, and Hisham al-Sayed visited Geneva, Switzerland, and met with the UN Human Rights Chief Volker Türk and the vice-president of the International Committee of the Red Cross Gilles Carbonnier to speak on behalf of their relatives. In December 2023, IDF troops destroyed Palestine Square in Gaza City along with a statue reportedly erected by Hamas which showed a fist emerging from an armored personnel carrier holding ID tags one of which is styled to mimic Oron Shauls. In March 2024, Israeli officials agreed to a proposed prisoner exchange and release which would include the bodies of Shaul and Goldin.

In January 2025 the parents of Goldin criticized Netanyahu about the perceived inaction for the recovery of their son's body, and the re-release of Palestinians who had been reportedly held as bargaining chips towards the release of their son and Shaul.

== Recovery ==
=== Recovery of Oron Shaul ===
On January 19, 2025, it was publicized that Israeli troops had recovered Shaul's body. The operation to recover the body was carried out jointly by the IDF and the Shin Bet security agency, with several special forces units including the Navy’s Shayetet 13 commando unit and another elite force in the Military Intelligence Directorate. The IDF did not reveal where in the Gaza Strip they found the body, and revealed three weeks later that the body was recovered only "hours before the ceasefire in Gaza came into effect". Shaul's body was brought back to Israel and taken to the Abu Kabir Forensic Institute where it was identified. He was buried at a cemetery in Poria Illit with President Isaac Herzog delivering a eulogy.

=== Return of Hadar Goldin ===
On November 8, 2025, during the Gaza ceasefire, a team of Red Cross and Hamas operatives entered Rafah's Al-Janina neighborhood, on the Israeli-controlled side of the Yellow Line, in search for Goldin's body. Later, Hamas announced that it recovered his body from a tunnel in the area. The Southern Command told Walla that Hamas recovered seven bodies from the area, but could not verify that Goldin's body was among them. On November 9, 2025, Hamas announced that Goldin's body would be returned at 2 p.m. the same day. Later that day, his body was picked up by the Red Cross and given to the IDF to be returned to Israel, where it was taken to the Abu Kabir Forensic Institute and identified as his. He was buried at the Kfar Saba military cemetery on November 11, and during his funeral, he was eulogized by IDF chief of staff Eyal Zamir.

== See also ==
- List of kidnappings
- Avera Mengistu
- Hisham al-Sayed
- Kidnapping of Alon Ohel
- List of Gaza war hostages
