= Tito Masoud =

Hamas militant (1967–2003)

Tito Masoud (1967 – 11 June 2003), also spelled as Tito Mas'ud, was a Palestinian militant and leader in the Izz ad-Din al-Qassam Brigades, the military arm of Hamas. He was an important figure in Palestinian domestic weapons production. Together with Nidal Farhat, Masoud manufactured the first Qassam rocket in 2001, which is actively deployed by the Izz ad-Din al-Qassam Brigades against military and civilian targets in southern Israel.

== Hamas career ==
Masoud began his involvement as a stone-throwing youth in 1987 during the First Intifada. He joined the Izz ad-Din al-Qassam Brigades, Hamas's military wing, and participated in raids against the Israel Defense Forces in Gaza. Masoud then moved into specializing in explosives and rocket development. In 1995, he became wanted by Israel after a colleague revealed his name and involvement in a deadly attack on an Israeli position.

Masoud and Nidal Farhat manufactured the first Qassam rocket, with a 2,500m range, in June 2001. The rocket was first deployed on 26 October 2001, when the Izz ad-Din al-Qassam Brigades claimed credit for launching one from the Gaza Strip into the Israeli city of Sderot. This development in rocket manufacturing and development was a turning point in the war between Palestinian armed factions and Israel.

== Death ==
On 11 June 2003, a Hamas suicide bomber dressed as an Orthodox Jew detonated an explosive device and killed 17 people in Jerusalem. Approximately half an hour after the bombing, Israeli Apache helicopters fired missiles at Masoud's car in Gaza City, killing him. Masoud's family will receive a stipend from Hamas until the children are older.
