= Hisham al-Sayed =

Israeli prisoner held by Hamas

- هشام السيد
- Born: February 15, 1988 (age 38); Al-Sayyid, Israel
- Known for: Hostage held by Hamas in the Gaza Strip

Hisham al-Sayed (Hebrew: הישאם א-סייד; Arabic: هشام السيد; born February 15, 1988) is a Muslim Bedouin Arab Israeli civilian who was held hostage by Hamas in the Gaza Strip for nearly ten years. Hamas has claimed al-Sayed is an Israeli soldier but Human Rights Watch has confirmed he is a civilian exempted from military service after attempting to serve for a brief period.

Hisham, who has schizophrenia, was released on 22 February 2025 as part of the 2025 Gaza war ceasefire.

== Biography ==
Hisham al-Sayed was born in 1988 in al-Sayyid to Manal al-Sayed and Sha’ban al-Sayed. He was diagnosed with a mental health condition, loss of hearing, tinnitus, and vertigo. In 2005 he was sent to study in Cyprus, and in 2010 studied in London. In 2010 he was diagnosed with "acute psychotic disorder" and in 2013 with schizophrenia.

Al-Sayed suffered from auditory hallucinations, and took orders from a voice in his head. He entered the West Bank on at least 15 occasions, and was detained by Palestinian Preventive Security at least three of those times.

On 18 August 2008, he volunteered for military service, but was discharged less than three months later on November 6, after being identified as "incompatible for service."

== Capture ==
On 20 April 2015, al-Sayed wandered into the Gaza Strip and was abducted by Hamas.

On 28 June 2022, Hamas released a video showing a sickly Al-Sayed in a hospital bed with an oxygen mask and an IV drip. Former Israeli Prime Minister Naftali Bennett condemned Hamas: "Spreading the clip of a sick man is despicable and an act of desperation."

== Release ==
In January 2025 after the leaking of a document showing information about the 2025 Gaza war ceasefire it was reported that Al-Sayed was set to be released by Hamas as part of the exchange. His family issued a statement shortly after the announcement expressing their happiness at his return and hope for all hostages to be released.

Al-Sayed was released on 22 February 2025, along with five other hostages held by Hamas. Unlike the other five hostages, al-Sayed was released without a public ceremony. The IDF confirmed receiving him a few hours later.

== See also ==
- Avera Mengistu, another Israeli civilian held by Hamas in Gaza since 2014 and released on 22 February 2025
- Deaths and ransoming of Oron Shaul and Hadar Goldin
