= Battle of Shuja'iyya (2014) =

Battle in the 2014 Israel-Gaza conflict

Coordinates: 31.4944°N 34.5111°E

- Part of the 2014 Gaza War
- Palestinians being evacuated from Shuja'iyya, with one of them receiving treatment from the Palestine Red Crescent Society paramedics, 20 July
Date	19–23 July 2014 (3 days)
Location	Shuja'iyya, Gaza City, Gaza Strip
Result	Israeli military victory Significant damage to the neighborhood

Belligerents
Israel	Hamas

Commanders and leaders
(Israel) Col. Ghassan Alian (WIA)	(Hamas) Wissam Farhat (commander of Shuja'iyya Battalion)

Units involved
Golani Brigade	Unknown

Casualties and losses
16 soldiers killed 56 soldiers wounded 1 captured	70–120 killed Combatants and civilians

The Battle of Shuja'iyya occurred between the Israel Defense Forces and the Izz ad-Din al-Qassam Brigades on 20 July 2014 during 2014 Israel–Gaza conflict in the Shuja'iyya neighborhood of Gaza City, in the Gaza Strip. Shuja'iyya, with 92,000 people in 6 sq-kilometres, is one of the most densely populated areas of the Gaza Strip. According to the IDF, it had become a "terrorist fortress", that between 8 and 20 July had fired over 140 rockets into Israel after the outbreak of hostilities. Casualty figures are not known with precision, partly because bodies were recovered long after the fighting, and people had also died of injuries afterwards. The UN Protection Cluster states that between the 19-20th, 55 civilians, including 19 children and 14 women, were killed as a result of the IDF's actions. At the time, estimates varied from 66 to about 120 Palestinians killed, with a third of them women and children, and at least 288 wounded. The UN figures of Palestinian casualties are preliminary and subject to revision. 16 Israeli soldiers were killed.

On 16 July, Israeli forces told residents of Shuja'iyya to leave and relocate to central Gaza City until further notice by means of leaflets, loudspeaker announcements, telephone calls, text messages, and radio messages. Residents interviewed afterwards by The Independent claimed lack of safe refuges and the difficulty of fleeing as reasons for staying put. By 19 July, OCHA reported that while the majority ignored the warnings and had not left their homes, up to half had gone as bombardments intensified. Israel condemned Hamas for using "human shields". According to Amnesty International, the UNRWA shelter facilities were overflowing and many of the residents had nowhere to go. Residents interviewed later also cited confusion due to lack of electricity and communications. The official Israeli view was that Hamas had compelled residents of Shujai'iya to stay behind in the face of IDF warnings to evacuate prior to the IDF assault, holding civilians as "hostages".

The assault on Shuja'iyya, involving a combination of F-16, tank and mortar fire, began at 11 pm on 19 July. Initially the attack led by the Golani Brigade encountered little resistance, until late on Saturday Hamas units emerged from tunnels to engage and put up stiff resistance, surprising the Israelis with their tenacity and effectiveness in taking on armoured units. According to Israeli military and intelligence sources, Israel then made use of heavy aerial bombardment and artillery fire, in what was described as a "risky and unusual step to save Israeli soldiers' lives" and "a battle against the hub of Hamas' terror infrastructure, primarily the so-called 'terror tunnels'". Palestinians attempting to flee the area described the scene as a "massacre", as did Mahmoud Abbas, Richard Falk, Norwegian physician Dr. Mads Gilbert and journalist Sharif Abdel Kouddous in The Nation.

The conclusion of U.S. military experts interviewed by Mark Perry was that the IDF did not target Hamas sites specifically or try solely to destroy Hamas tunnels, but rather laid down a "walking barrage" to "crater the neighbourhood". This bombardment was carried out instead of using suppressive fire to protect IDF forward troops, a strategy they deemed "indefensible". The operation was condemned internationally, with UN Secretary-General Ban Ki-moon calling it an "atrocious action" and the European Union stating that it "is particularly appalled by the human cost of the Israeli military operation in Shuja'iyya", while also criticising Hamas calls for using "human shields".

== Build up ==
On Wednesday 16 July, Israeli forces dropped leaflets and delivered warnings by phone and text that residents in the Zeitoun and Shujai'iya areas of Gaza City should evacuate ahead of planned strikes. Hamas had told the civilians to stay put, which were prompted by fears of psychological warfare and perhaps a desire to avoid panic. On Thursday Israel began what it thought of as a limited operation, involving the Nahal, Paratrooper and Givati Brigades, in the Shuja'iyya area's sparsely populated eastern periphery, intent on uncovering Hamas's tunnel system. In the face of stiff resistance over the following two days, the probing advance developed into a full-scale battle in Shuja'iyya and the surrounding areas, as the IDF suffered upwards of 56 casualties.

In Ben White's reconstruction of the background, the day after flyers were dropped, Yedioth Ahronoth's military analyst, Alex Fishman noted that an order had been given to the tank units advancing the assault "to open fire at anything that moved," and a military spokesman declared that Israel was "taking off the gloves" in Shuja'iyya. On Saturday night, the Golani Brigade was sent in with armoured battalions into the densely populated heart of Shuja'iyya, and suffered heavy casualties. and only then did Israel decide to increase the intensity of its firepower, resulting in the steep rise in Palestinian civilian casualties, as commanders envisaged a repeat of Dahiya tactics used in Dahieh in Beirut, Lebanon, were resistance to continue. A local Gazan woman, returning to the ruins of her home in the neighbourhood, made the same comparison. As a result of the onslaught 670 buildings in Shuja'iyya were completely destroyed, 608 were severely damaged, 576 moderately damaged, and over 1800 buildings were affected.

== Battle ==
Shuja'iyya is a densely populated area of the city with 92,000 residents according to Amnesty International. The UNRWA shelter facilities were overflowing and many of the residents had nowhere to go. According to Israeli sources the area had been designed by Hamas, houses had tunnels to hide weapons and combatants and that 10% of rocket attacks had been done from within Shuja'iyya. The assault on Shuja'iyya, involving a combination of F-16, tank and mortar fire, began at 11 pm on 19 July. According to the IDF, 15 Hamas fighters were killed in the preemptive bombardment. After midnight, on Sunday, 20 July, Israeli forces entered the neighbourhood, stating that over 140 rockets had been fired at Israel from the neighborhood since 8 July. Flyers had been dropped over the neighbourhood, urging residents to flee.

Some families, such as that of Khalil Atash, spoke of being alerted in Arabic by the IDF to evacuate, but dismissed the message as a prank. Fleeing, as did his son, Tamar and his family and neighbours, was difficult since Israel had destroyed all the electricity towers and the area was shrouded in darkness which had to be traversed under withering fire by the use of cellphone flashlights.

Initially the attack, led by the Golani Brigade, encountered little resistance, until late on Saturday when forward elements of the Israeli force met Hamas units, and fierce fighting broke out as Hamas fighters emerged from tunnels and bunkers to engage the Israelis, employing sniper fire and dozens of anti-tank missiles, surprising the Israelis with their capacity to take on armored units. Fierce fighting that lasted into Sunday morning ensued as IDF forces battled Hamas squads, sniper units and teams carrying anti-tank rockets, rocket-propelled grenades, and automatic weapons. Some Israeli formations were pinned down in heavy fighting in the neighborhood's streets and alleys.

On 20 July, beginning in the early morning hours, the IDF suffered 13 fatalities, beginning with an attack on an IDF M113 armored personnel carrier in Shuja'iyya. The APC had stalled while driving through one of the neighborhood's narrow streets. A soldier and officer then exited the vehicle to fix the problem. Shortly after 1 AM, Hamas fighters fired an RPG-29 anti-tank rocket at the APC, causing it to explode and burst into flames. All 7 soldiers inside the vehicle, who were from the Golani Brigade, were killed while the soldier and officer who had exited it survived the attack. Following the attack, an Israeli drone recorded infrared images of five people near the armored vehicle. Golani Brigade commanders then ordered other soldiers in the field to converge on the APC and recover the remains of soldiers inside the vehicle. However, the soldiers were wary of approaching the APC, fearing that weaponry inside could set off a secondary explosion. Soldiers reported hearing shouting in Arabic in the vicinity of the APC. The IDF concluded that Hamas fighters had already reached the vehicle and taken the remains of Sergeant Oron Shaul, one of the seven soldiers in the armored vehicle, by this time. Shaul's body was not found, and the IDF later officially changed his status from missing in action to killed in action, although his body had not yet been recovered. Hamas said it captured an IDF soldier it identified as Aron Shaul. Around twenty minutes after the attack on the APC, another Israeli soldier was killed in a firefight. By dawn, with the APC still ablaze, IDF commanders ordered engineers to tow the stricken vehicle back into Israel. During the operation, Hamas fighters targeted the rescue vehicles and engaged in battles with IDF troops as the convoy pulled back. As the APC was being towed, human remains fell out of the vehicle and the engineers, under constant threat of fire, inadvertently drove over and buried some of the remains. Hamas fighters targeted the rescue force with prepared ambushes and emerged from tunnels to attack soldiers. Two Israeli soldiers were killed in an exchange of fire at around 6 AM, after which the IDF brought in D9 armored bulldozers to destroy Hamas positions. In one instance, some Hamas operatives were killed when an IDF D9 bulldozer destroyed the tunnel they were in. Three more Israeli soldiers were killed when an anti-tank missile hit a building where the IDF was establishing a command post, setting it on fire.

Later, when Hamas scouts spotted a large part of the Israeli force, particularly heavy fire was laid down by Hamas fighters. Israeli commanders then gave the order to "take the gloves off" and "fire at anything that moves." The Israeli infantry were ordered to go into protected Namer armored personnel carriers, and given half an hour to do so, after which Hamas positions were targeted by a fierce artillery barrage and airstrikes. Artillery fire landed within 100 meters of IDF positions, closer than the 250 meters normally considered safe. Around 600 shells were fired in a half-hour period. An IDF officer told Haaretz that troops "were taking fire from all sides and they couldn't neutralize the threat with all the firepower we gave them", leading the IDF to use its artillery in close proximity to IDF troops, a decision Haaretz described as "extremely risky" and "unusual". As Israeli artillery intensively shelled the neighborhood, Israeli Air Force planes bombed from above. Following the barrage, all Hamas firing stopped. According to the IDF, 37 Hamas fighters were killed, including several field commanders, eight squad commanders, and a company commander.

An unnamed American military officer told Al Jazeera that, according to Pentagon reports of the IDF's actions, a total of 11 Israeli artillery battalions deployed 258 artillery pieces which fired around 7,000 high explosive shells into Shuja'iyya, including 4,800 shells in a 7-hour period. The IDF sources reported that the tactics used prevented significant additional Israeli casualties and that the battle resulted in the IDF changing the rules of engagement to allow the use of artillery in urban areas. A paramedic at a local call centre said there were more than 200 calls for help in the period, one from virtually every house in a-Nazaz Street, a-Sha'ath Street, and al-Beltaji Street, with children's screams audible in the background. Commenting on the intensity of the firepower, perhaps due to the loss of Israeli soldiers, Tamer Atash later recalled:

"The F-16s were no longer up in the sky bombing us, they were flying just above the houses. It felt like an atomic bomb with four F-16s coming one way and another four from the opposite direction, weaving between the houses. At this point, we realized we were not surviving. We said our last prayers, and that was it. Because we know that when the Israelis lose one of their soldiers they become lunatics. We just knew they had suffered something, we could sense it."

Witnesses interviewed by Max Blumenthal testified observing people jumping from fourth-floor stories as flames engulfed their houses and of men stripping off clothes to cover near-naked women fleeing the scene. Several residential blocks were extensively shelled destroying dozens of houses. Palestinians attempting to flee the area described the scene as a "massacre", as did the Palestinian president Mahmoud Abbas, Richard Falk, Norwegian doctor Mads Gilbert and journalist Sharif Abdel Kouddous in The Nation. Hundreds of civilians were injured during the unpredictable combination of artillery shelling and airstrikes overnight and only began to leave the area at dawn, many to seek refuge at the Al-Shifa Hospital. Two paramedics were killed during attempts to enter the area and assist the wounded, and Médecins Sans Frontières complained that its post-operative clinic in Gaza City was running at 10 to 30 percent of capacity due to the intensity of the bombing, which hindered patients from reaching the center.

The following day, the IAF dropped at least 100 one-ton bombs about 250 meters away from IDF ground troops in a broad aerial attack. Makor Rishon reported that a total of 120 one-ton bombs were used. On July 23, the IDF completed its takeover of the neighborhood. Although the IDF took control of the neighborhood, clashes continued. On July 26, Golani Brigade soldiers found the tunnel from which the Hamas squad that had destroyed the Israeli APC had operated from, and Israeli combat engineers subsequently blew it up. In an attempt to further recover the remains of soldiers, the IDF sent in military tractors to sweep away a large amount of sand which could have contained remains.

== Incidents ==
- Al Helo family. At 3 a.m. 2 missiles struck the 3rd floor of 3 story home of Talal Mahmoud Hamed Al Helo in Nasas Street. The family was on the 2nd floor. His brother Jihad Mahmoud Al Helo, next door, phoned to ask after them. Shortly afterwards, Johad's house was struck by two missiles and all his Al Helo family members, 11 people including 4 children (including 2 six-month old twins and 4 women), were killed. The three-story house was totally destroyed. The surviving brother said no warning had been received, unless the rocket hitting his house was a roof knocking missile. If so, he claimed, the warning was not sufficient to allow them to flee in safety.
- Ayyad family. At 6.30 a.m., artillery shelling killed 11 members of the Ayyad family and relatives they were hosting, as they were leaving their home on Al Mansura Street, Shuja'iyya, as they left their home to escape the shelling. The area where their house was located had been subjected to shelling since 1 a.m., leaving the family in a state of total panic. As they made their way, some 70 metres down the road, a shell hit the house's entrance, and two follow up rounds struck the group of 11 people, which included 4 children and 5 women, one pregnant. A further 7 persons were wounded including 3 children and one woman. Ambulances could not reach them because of the continual IAF aerial bombing. One survivor said no warnings had been given: had they been messaged to that effect, the women would have been evacuated, he said. The munitions were probably 155 mm high explosive artillery shells, exploding just above ground level, the UN Commission concluded.
- Al Jamal and Al Sheikh Khalil families. Israeli forces launched an attack in Baltaji Street. The Al Sheikh Khalil family stayed inside their home on the street: one witness said at 6 a.m, explosions rang outside, and mortars had struck the roof. The family relocated to the stairwell, and called the red Cross for help. When ambulances arrived, they too were hit by mortars, and the family could not exit. 6 members were killed, 2 children and 4 women, and another two children seriously wounded. Four died while waiting 6 hours for another ambulance to arrive. At 7 a.m., 47 members of the Al Jamal family fled their home in Tawfiq Street. During the assault, 4 members of the Al Jamal, 3 aged between 10 and 12, were killed, and another 7, including 2 children and 4 women, were wounded while attempting to flee Shuja'iyya.

== Ceasefire ==
Some time after dawn, a one-hour ceasefire was brokered but the International Committee of the Red Cross proved unable to evacuate those trapped in the area. According to a witness interviewed by the UNHRC, there was a 2-hour ceasefire, but the family still had to wait for 6 hours before ambulances arrived at the scene. About 7 a.m. a military medical aid ambulance was directly struck twice while trying to succor casualties. Of the 4 persons occupants - a driver, a photographer and two paramedics -two were killed, and two wounded. Two of them were killed and two injured. Israel's Golani Brigade positioned itself on the outskirts, in home east of the main Shuja'iyya mosque.

According to Max Blumenthal, maps discovered later indicated the broad swathe of land where apartments were flattened beyond these houses was defined as a "Soccer Field". According to one survivor, Mohammed Fathi Al Areer, bullet casings found near the bodies of four of his brothers, one mentally disabled, who were killed in houses east of the "Soccer Field", suggested they were executed. His neighbours, the Shamaly family, stayed behind to protect their valuable retail clothing stock, and, according to a son, Hesham Naser Shamaly, his father was shot as he tried to speak to approaching soldiers in Hebrew, as was his uncle and aunt, and two cousins. His father survived, but a cousin, Salem Shamaly (22), a grocer at the local market who attempted to find missing family by returning to the neighbourhood during the two-hour ceasefire at 3:30pm that day, was shot three times, while calling out the names of family members, after crossing the imaginary red line Israeli soldiers are reported to have drawn to kill anyone coming close to their positions. He was injured by the first shot and fell to the ground, and killed when a further two shots were fired into him. The New York Times reported however that the 'gunman's' identity is unknown. The incident was caught on film by members of the International Solidarity Movement accompanying him, and posted on YouTube.

According to a former IDF sergeant turned activist, Eran Efrati, who has stated he took testimony from three Israeli soldiers present at the scene, a sniper asked his commandant three times if it was ok to shoot Shamaly, and was given permission when the latter stepped beyond the line. The soldiers felt guilty, Efrati added, about the death of a man who had posed no threat to their lives. Channel 4 stated it "has been unable to independently verify the video or Mr Efrati's claims".

One instance of soldiers looting a house in Shuja'iyya, including $605 for partying after the war, led to an indictment in Israel.

== Casualties ==
At least 65 Palestinians, including at least 17 children, 14 women and 4 elderly were killed and 288 Palestinians were wounded according to Shifa hospital's director, Naser Tattar. The United Nations' Committee on the Exercise of the Inalienable Rights of the Palestinian People put the estimate at over 70 Palestinian dead. Other reports at the time claimed 120 Palestinians had been killed, a third women and children. According to the spokesman for the Palestinian Ministry of Health, Ashraf al-Qidra, rescue teams retrieved more than 80 dead bodies from houses destroyed in Shuja'iyya, 17 of which were children, 14 women and 4 elderly people.

Hamas said it captured an Israeli soldier.

On 20 July, the IDF confirmed that 13 soldiers were killed and 56 wounded in the battle. Of the dead, two were American-born and one who was French-born. Seven of the IDF soldiers were killed when their armored vehicle was hit by an anti-tank rocket, three were killed in clashes with militants, and three were killed by an anti-tank missile fired at a building where IDF soldiers were setting up a makeshift command center. In the following 24 hours, three additional IDF soldiers were killed in Shuja'iyya. Among the wounded was Colonel Ghassan Alian, the commander of the Golani Brigade.

Shortly after the battle, Hamas is reported to have shot twenty civilians from Shuja'iyya for protesting against Hamas for the massive destruction inflicted on their neighborhood by the IDF. Hamas said it had executed spies in the area.

Unexploded Israeli ordnance left over from the bombing exploded in late September killing a further two young men, Ayman Ziad Abu Jibba (23) and Abdullah Jibril Abu Aser (23) and wounding three in Shuja'iyya.

== Military assessments ==
When U.S. Secretary of State John Kerry was overheard sarcastically remarking on Fox News on July 20 that the operations in Shuja'iyya were "a hell of a pinpoint operation,” according to Mark Perry, his comments reflected U.S. military assessments of a battle in which Israel's use of 11 artillery battalions was equivalent to what the U.S. deployed for 2 divisions, or even a full corps. The only explanation for adopting the massive firepower unleashed by a mix of Soltam M-71 and Paladin M109 guns was, according to one U.S. military expert, "to kill a lot of people in as short a period of time as possible,” adding that, “It's not mowing the lawn. It's removing the topsoil.” 'Mowing the lawn' is an Israeli idiom referring to periodic operations conducted by the IDF in the Gaza Strip. Lieutenant General Robert G. Gard Jr. noted that technically, even if 10% of the shells fired on Shuja'iyya hit close to their targets, at a minimum in the range of 700 lethal shells would have landed amidst the civilian population overnight 20–21 July. 155-mm howitzer shells have a kill radius of 164 feet.

The conclusion of U.S. military experts interviewed by Perry is that the IDF did not target Hamas sites specifically, simply to collapse Hamas tunnels, but rather laid down a 'walking barrage' to 'crater the neighbourhood' instead of using suppressive fire to protect their forward troops, a strategy they deemed 'indefensible'. Accounting for the high civilian casualties as a result of a Hamas strategy of using civilians as 'human shields' was dismissed by one officers as a refusal by the IDF to assume responsibility for the consequences of the strategy adopted.

According to a report by Action on Armed Violence (AOAV), after Israeli soldiers came under heavy fire in Shuja'iyya on 20 July 2014, where 13 soldiers were killed, Israel was thought to have fired 600 artillery shells were fired into the densely populated neighbourhood and dropped 100 one-ton bombs. Up to 65 Palestinians were reportedly killed that day, of whom 10 were women and 13 children, and more bodies were later found under the rubble. The author of the report, Robert Perkins, said "Errors occur with this type of shell, it is fundamental to the way it works, but there is no margin for error in Gaza because you will hit markets, houses, and civilians, and that is what happened".

== Analysis of the UN Commission of Inquiry 2015 ==
As a result of its investigation into the battle, part of a general inquiry into the Gaza war, the UN Commission concluded that:

The sheer number of shells fired, as well as the reported dropping of over 100 one-ton bombs in a short period of time in a densely populated area, together with the reported use of an artillery barrage, raise questions as to the respect by the IDF of the rules of distinction, precautions and proportionality. These methods and means employed by the IDF could not, in such a small and densely populated area, be directed at a specific military target and could not adequately distinguish between civilians and civilian objects and military objectives as required by IHL. ... Therefore, there are strong indications that the IDF’s Shuja’iya operation on 19 and 20 July was conducted in violation of the prohibition of indiscriminate attacks and may amount to a war crime.

Regarding the killing of Salem Shamaly, the UN Commission wrote:

The fact that he was shot twice while lying injured on the ground is indicative of an intent to kill a protected person (either owing to his civilian status or to the fact that he was hors de combat) and constitutes an act of wilful killing.

A deputy company commander in the Golani Brigade responded by saying "The claim that the IDF acted immorally is an untrue statement, and our situation in Shujaiyeh is the best example of this. Hamas operatives were waiting for us there, and we were sent into a carefully laid trap because of our considerations in harming the Palestinian population."

== Official reactions ==
Involved parties

Israel: Prime Minister Benjamin Netanyahu defended the military actions that resulted in the deaths, maintaining that Hamas was using the area to launch attacks against Israel. He blamed the Palestinians, stating, "We asked in every way for the civilian population to leave, Hamas told them not to so they could be used as human shields".

Palestine: The Palestinian Authority condemned the attack as a "massacre" and declared three days of mourning. The newly inaugurated Palestinian government described the attack as a "war crime" which required immediate international intervention. "The Palestinian consensus government condemned in the strongest terms the heinous massacre committed by the Israeli occupation forces against innocent Palestinian civilians in the neighbourhood of Shuja'iyya," it said.

International

Iran: "The Iranian government and nation, as in the past, will stand by the proud Palestinian people and their brave resistance and will not be silent in the face of the brutal crimes by the Zionists," Iran's Foreign Ministry Spokeswoman Marzieh Afkham said on Sunday. She added that Muslim and freedom-seeking nations in the world would undoubtedly give an "unforgettable lesson" to the Israeli government on Friday's International Quds Day in support of the Palestinian resistance against Israel.

Canada: Foreign Affairs Minister John Baird told reporters: "We mourn the death of every single innocent civilian. I think you can just conclude that there’s one group that is fully and entirely responsible for this tragedy. And it is Hamas. They are responsible and they can stop this at any moment."

Supranational

Arab League: Secretary-General Nabil Elaraby called for an immediate cessation to the Israeli "barbarous ground incursion" in Gaza in addition to the ongoing bombardment across Gaza. He called to provide the necessary protection to the Palestinian civilians, holding Israel fully responsible for what he described as a "hideous crime."

UN: Secretary-General Ban Ki-moon called the attack on Shejaiya "an atrocious action","Israel must exercise maximum restraint and do far more to protect civilians.”.

EU: The European Union said it "is particularly appalled by the human cost of the Israeli military operation in Shuja'iyya".

== See also ==
- Israeli war crimes
- List of massacres in the Palestinian territories
