= 2002 Atzmona attack =

Terrorist attack in the Second Intifada

Coordinates: 31.7887°N 35.2223°E

The attack in Atzmona pre-military training camp
- Part of the Second Intifada
- Location: Atzmona
- Date: March 7, 2002; 24 years ago c. 23:30 (GMT+2)
- Attack type: Terrorist attack
- Deaths: 5 trainees on age 18-19
- Injuries: 23 (including four seriously injured)
- Perpetrator: Hamas claimed responsibility

An attack took place on the night of March 7, 2002 at the Otzem Pre-Military Preparatory School in the Israeli settlement of Atzmona in the Gaza Strip in which five of the seminary students were killed and twenty-three were injured.

== Background ==
March 2002 was the deadliest month of the Second Intifada, known in Israel as "Black March". During the month, 135 people were killed in over a dozen attacks, and there was a suicide bombing once every two days on average. In addition to the Atzmona attack, notable attacks during the month included the Yeshivat Beit Yisrael bombing that killed 10 Israeli civilians on 2 March, the Wadi al-Haramiya sniper attack on 3 March that killed 10 Israelis, and the Café Moment bombing that killed 11 Israeli civilians on 9 March. After the Passover massacre on 27 March killed 30 people celebrating the Jewish holiday of Passover, the Israeli government launched Operation Defensive Shield targeting Palestinian militant capabilities in refugee camps and cities in the West Bank that had developed after the Israeli withdrawal after the Oslo Accords.

== Massacre ==
On March 7, 2002, at around 11:30 p.m., a terrorist from the Jebaliya refugee camp, armed with an automatic weapon, entered the Atzmona settlement in the southern Gaza Strip. He entered the settlement from the territory of the neighboring Arab village of Hamuasi, cutting a passage in the barbed wire that surrounded Atzmona. Then he went to the building of training courses for military service (“mekhina kdam-tsvait”). Having entered a room intended for classes on the study of religious texts, the terrorist opened fire from a Kalashnikov assault rifle at students studying in the building and threw several grenades. After that, he ran out into the street and started shooting at passers-by and houses. He continued until he was eliminated by one of the residents of the settlement, an Israel Defense Forces soldier. From the moment the attack began until the militant's death, 10 to 20 minutes has passed, during which time he managed to shoot 9 machine gun magazines and throw 7 grenades.

== The victims ==
The attack killed five Israelis and injured 23 people were injured, four seriously. The wounded were evacuated to Soroka Hospital in Beer Sheva.

Those killed were all 18 year old boys:

- Arik Krogliak of Beit El
- Tal Kurtzweil of Bnei Brak
- Asher Marcus of Jerusalem
- Eran Picard of Jerusalem
- Ariel Zana of Jerusalem

== Circumstances and further events ==
The Izz ad-Din al-Qassam organization (the military wing of the Hamas movement) took responsibility for the attack. The terrorist was identified as 19-year-old (according to other sources, 17-year-old) Muhammad Fathi Farhat, a native of Gaza.

The day after the Atzmona massacre, the Israel Defense Forces carried out major operations in the Gaza Strip in search of other militants. IDF operations killed 16 Palestinians in two villages near Khan Younis in the southern part of the strip, including the head of the area's security agency, General Ahmad Mufrij, who became the highest-ranking Palestinian security official killed since the start of the Al-Aqsa intifada. Four more Palestinians were killed by fire from Israeli ships and helicopters in a police station north of Gaza.

It subsequently turned out that the ideological training of the future suicide bomber was conducted by his own mother, Maryam Muhammad Yusif Farhat, now better known as Umm Nidal. On the eve of the terrorist attack, she filmed a video with Muhammad in which she blessed his future actions and which was made public after his death. In addition to Muhammad Farhat, two more sons of Umm-Nidal died in the process of preparing hostile actions against Israel - the eldest son, Nidal, during the preparation of a terrorist attack (he and five other Hamas members worked on the creation of an unmanned aerial vehicle filled with explosives), and third son Ruad in a car carrying a Qassam missile and fired upon by Israeli soldiers. During the first intifada, Farhat hid one of the commanders of the Izz al-Din al-Qassam Brigades, Imad Akel, in her home for 14 months. Muhammad Farhat, who witnessed Akel and his associates preparing actions against the Israelis, became his student and member of the Izz al-Din al-Qassam Brigades at the age of seven. Later in an interview, Maryam Farhat talked about how she fostered a love of jihad in her sons, who fully joined the military wing of Hamas. In September 2002, the IDF destroyed the Farhat family's home in Gaza as part of efforts to prevent future terrorist attacks. In 2006, Umm Nidal, after the death of Ruad, who declared that she wanted to see her other four sons as martyrs, was elected as a deputy of the Palestinian Legislative Council from Hamas.

During Operation Iron Swords, more than 20 years after the attack, the Israeli military killed in Gaza two senior Hamas militants it stated were involved in planning the attack in Atzmona. Mohammed Dababish was killed on November 13, 2023, and Wissam Farhat was killed on December 3, 2023. Taysir Mubasher, who was also involved in the attack and many others during the following years, was killed in a joint IDF-Shin Bet operation in Gaza in October 2023. He was then the commander of the Hamas in Khan Yunis.

== See also ==
- Israeli casualties of war
- List of massacres in Israel
- List of terrorist incidents, 2002
- Palestinian political violence
