= Gilles Carbonnier =

Swiss academic, development economist and humanitarian

Gilles Carbonnier is Professor of development economics and Director of executive education at Geneva’s Graduate Institute of International and Development Studies (IHIED).. From April 2018 to April 2026, he was the Vice-president of the International Committee of the Red Cross (ICRC).

Carbonnier is an academic, development economist and humanitarian. His fields of expertise include tax governance and development finance, humanitarian and development policies, natural resource governance, as well as business and human rights.

Carbonnier pioneered the scholarly field of humanitarian economics with the publication of Humanitarian Economics: War, Disaster and the Global Aid Market (Oxford University Press 2016).

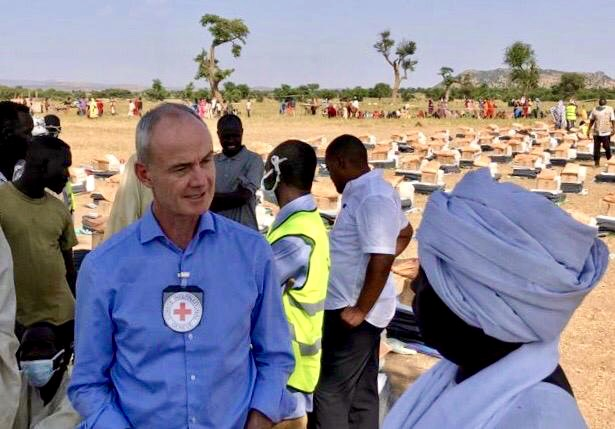
In South Darfour, Sudan, with returnees (2020).

== Early life and studies ==
Carbonnier was born in 1965 and grew up in Neuchâtel, Switzerland. In his youth, he worked and travelled across Latin America. This experience led him to study development economics and prompted a life-long interest in global development. He obtained a Ph.D. in Economics from the University of Neuchâtel in 2001 with a thesis on The Economics of War-torn Countries.

== Career ==
Carbonnier’s career trajectory combines academia, humanitarian action, international trade and development.

Academia

Since 2007 Carbonnier has been a full professor in the Department of International Economics at Geneva’s Graduate Institute of International and Development Studies (IHEID), where he was also Director of Studies in 2015-18.

Carbonnier was the founder and first Editor-in-Chief of the e-Journal International Development Policy (2010-2018). Over the same period, he was President of the Centre for Education and Research in Humanitarian Action and Vice-President of the European Association of Development Studies.

Carbonnier has been a visiting professor in several academic institutions including the American University of Beirut (Issam Fares Institute); the Lee Kuan Yew School of Public Policy and SciencesPo - Paris.

ICRC & humanitarian action

Carbonnier first joined the ICRC in1989, working as a field delegate in El Salvador, Sri-Lanka, Ethiopia and Iraq through to 1991. He returned as economic adviser in 1999-2006 and developed ICRC’s relations with the private sector. In 2018 he was appointed vice-president, representing the ICRC internationally, engaging with states and other stakeholders on international humanitarian law (IHL) and humanitarian access. He has promoted humanitarian innovations with the scientific community and linkages between humanitarian action and sustainable development for people caught in protracted crises.

International Trade and Development

After short assignments in the 80’s with the Government Development Bank for Puerto Rico and Japan Institute for Social and Economic Affairs (Keizai Koho Center), Carbonnier joined the Swiss Federal Office for Foreign Economic Affairs where he conducted multilateral trade negotiations under the GATT/WTO and trade-related development work (1992-1996). He also served as an adviser to Vietnam’s accession to the WTO (1996-1999).

He is a member of the Council on Economic Policies, and a former member of the Swiss Advisory Committee on International Cooperation (2008–19) and Independent Evaluation Committee (2009–14). Between 1993-1996 he undertook electoral supervision missions with the UN and OSCE in Armenia, Bosnia-Herzegovina, Mozambique and Ukraine.

Carbonnier speaks French, English, German, Spanish and Portuguese.

== Selected publications ==
- Humanitarian Economics - War, Disaster, and the Global Aid Market (Hurst & Oxford University Press, 2016)
- Thematic issues Editor, International Development Policy Journal:
  - Missing Dollars - Illicit Financial Flows from Commodity Trade (Brill, 2024)
  - The ILO @100 – Addressing the Past and Future of Work and Social Protection (Brill, 2019)
  - Alternative Pathways to Sustainable Development: Lessons from Latin-America (Brill, 2017)
  - Education, Learning, Training: Critical Issues for Development (Brill, 2015)
  - Religion and Development (Palgrave, 2013)
  - Aid, Emerging Economies and Global Policies (Palgrave, 2012)
  - Energy and Development (Palgrave, 2011)
  - Africa – 50 Years of Independence (The Graduate Institute, 2010)
- The Global and Local Governance of Extractive Resources (2011)
- Natural Resource Governance and Hybrid Political Orders (2013)
- The Rise of Disaster Risk Insurance and Derivatives (2015)
- Reason, Emotion, Compassion: Can Altruism Survive Professionalization in the Humanitarian Sector? (2015)
- Business-Humanitarian Partnerships: Processes of Normative Legitimation (2015)
- Privatization & outsourcing in wartime: the humanitarian challenges (2006)
- The Competing Agendas of Economic Reform and Peace Process (2002)
- Institutional Learning in North-South Research Partnerships (2015)

== Media references ==
- Thought Economics - How to change the world, by Vikas Shah MBE
- Geneva Solutions - Business is the engine of development, under the right conditions, by Gilles Carbonnier
- ReliefWeb - ICRC's Gilles Carbonnier on impact of heavy explosive weapons in populated areas
- SciDev - Power imbalances ‘still harming North-South alliances’, by Jan Piotrowski
