= Amir Rapaport =

Israeli journalist

- עמיר רפפורט
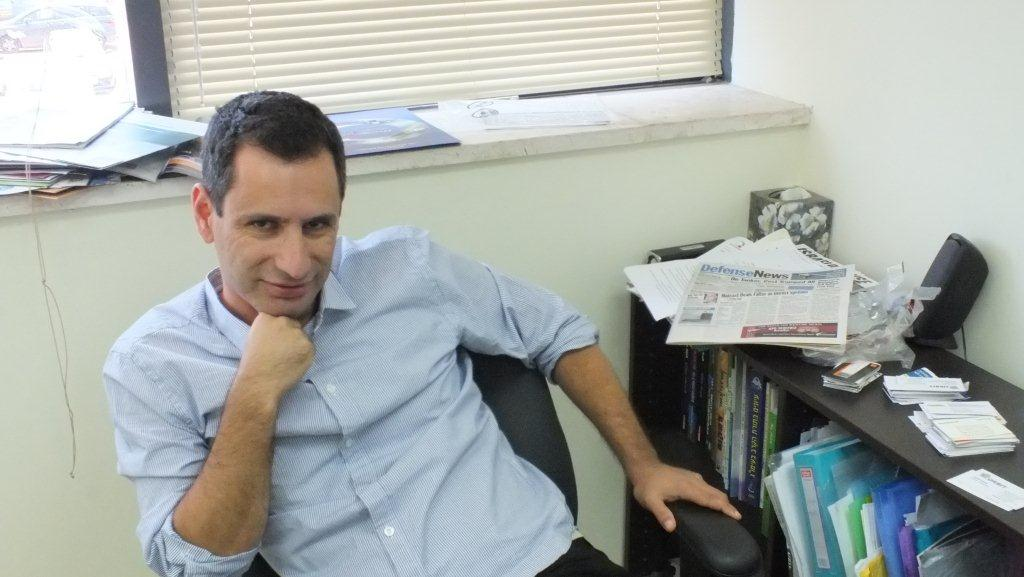
- Born: March 11, 1970 (age 56)
- Education: Ben-Gurion University
- Occupations: Analyst; Journalist

Amir Rapaport (Hebrew: עמיר רפפורט; born 11 March 1970) is an Israeli analyst, journalist, entrepreneur, and cyber expert.

== Personal life ==
Amir Rappaport was born in Beersheba, Israel and holds a B.A. in economics from Ben-Gurion University of the Negev. He is married and has two children.

== Journalism career ==
From 1987 to 1989, Rapaport was a partner and first editor of the agriculture magazine Mashov Khakla'ut.

From 1991 to 1996, Rapaport wrote for Yediot Aharonoth. He covered the arrival of Yasser Arafat to Gaza. In 1994 he published the book Mystery about the murder of Hanit Kicos.

In 1996 Rapaport became the military correspondent of Yedioth Ahronoth. In 2002 he moved to Ma'ariv as a military analyst, remaining until November 2008. Rapaport covered the withdrawal of Israel Defense Forces from security belt in south Lebanon, the Second Intifada, disengagement from Gaza, and the Second Lebanon War. He is the author of Fire on Our Forces.

In 2006 Rapaport published the findings of a multi-year investigation, along with criminologist Dr. Ariel Livne. They claimed that the Bedouin Suleiman Alabid, convicted of murdering Hanit Kicos, was innocent. Following the investigation a committee headed by former Supreme Court judge Miriam Ben Porat shortened Alabid's sentence.

In 2009 Rapaport joined the Security Zone radio program. In 2010 he published a study, The IDF and the Lessons of the Second Lebanon War at the Begin-Sadat Center and founded the media group Arrowmedia Israel, Ltd.

In 2021 Rapaport’s fourth book, Cybermania was published (co-written with Prof. Eviatar Matania). Cybermania describes the story of the global cyber revolution and the leading role Israel has in shaping the cyber eco system.

== Cybertech Global Events ==
Rapaport is the founder of Cybertech Global Events, an international business platform for cyber, tech, and innovation.
