= Qassam rocket =

Palestinian homemade artillery rocket

Qassam
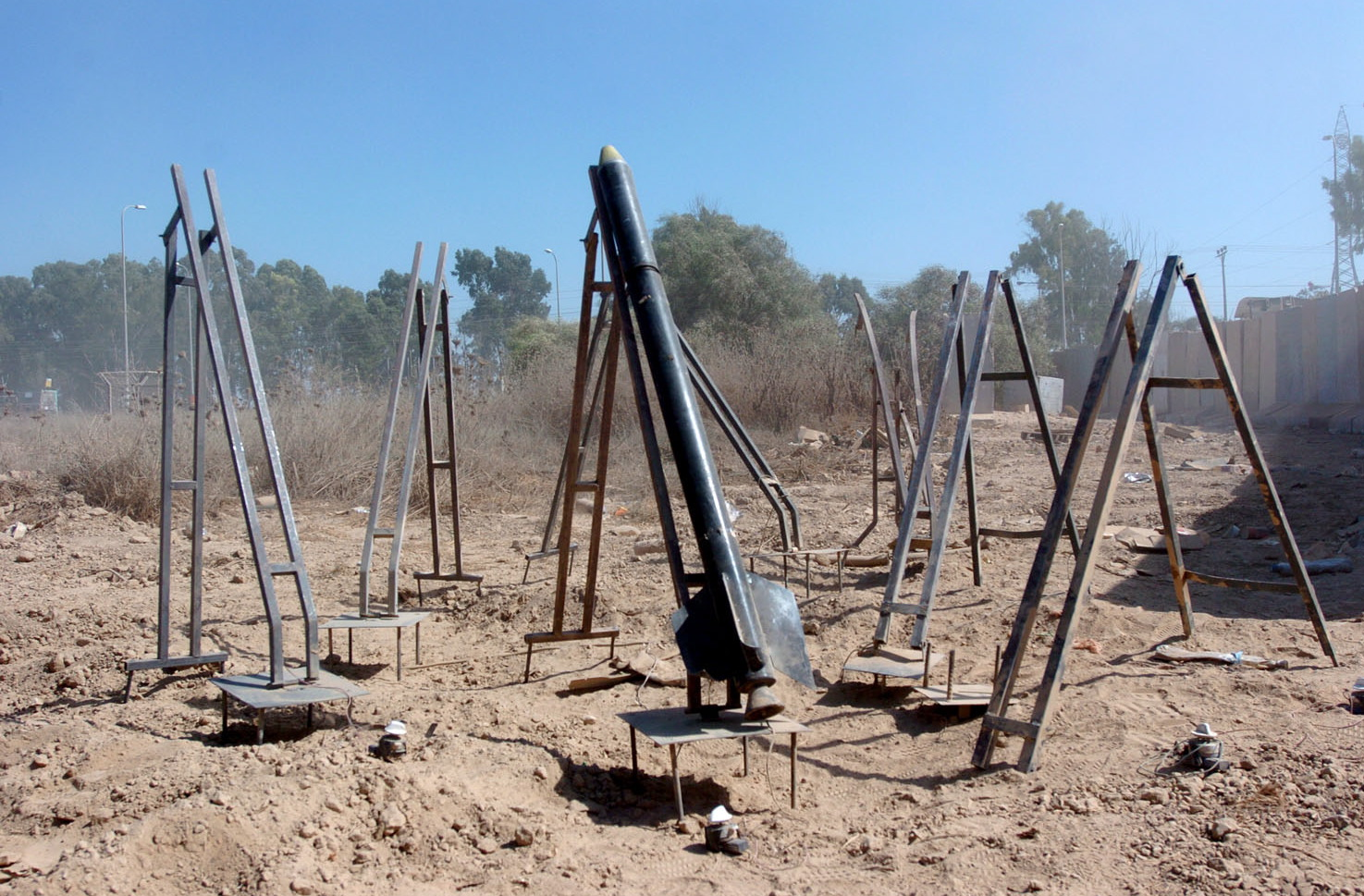
- Eight Qassam launchers, seven equipped with operating systems and one armed and ready to launch.

Service history
- Used by: Palestinian militants
- Wars: Gaza–Israel conflict

Production history
- Designer: Izz ad-Din al-Qassam Brigades
- Designed: 2001
- Manufacturer: Palestinian militants
- Produced: 2001–current

Specifications
- Mass: 35 kg
- Length: 180 cm
- Diameter: 11.5 cm
- Warhead: Explosive material with metal bearing balls; standard explosive material
- Propellant: Solid fuel (sugar and potassium nitrate mix)

The Qassam rocket (Arabic: صاروخ القسام Ṣārūkh al-Qassām; also Kassam) is a simple, steel artillery rocket developed and deployed by the Izz ad-Din al-Qassam Brigades, the military arm of Hamas. The rockets are propelled by a solid mixture of sugar and potassium nitrate.

Since the rocket was first manufactured in 2001 by Tito Masoud and Nidal Farhat, three models of the Qassam rocket have been produced and used. More generally, all types of Palestinian rockets fired into southern Israel, for example the Palestinian Islamic Jihad Al Quds rockets, are called Qassams by the Israeli media, and often by foreign media.

Leading international human rights organizations have called Palestinian armed groups' use of Qassam rockets against civilians and civilian targets a war crime and a violation of international law.

Many of the rocket's components are made of common materials such as sugar, fertilizer, firearms cartridges, springs, nails, and steel cylinders.

== History ==
=== Name ===
Qassam rockets are named after the Izz ad-Din al-Qassam Brigades, the armed branch of Hamas, itself named for Izz ad-Din al-Qassam, a Syrian Muslim preacher whose death during a guerrilla raid against British Mandatory authorities in 1935 was one of the catalysts for the 1936–39 Arab revolt in Palestine.

=== Manufacture and deployment ===
Tito Masoud and Nidal Farhat manufactured the first Qassam-1 rocket in June 2001. This development in rocket manufacturing and development was a turning point in the war between Palestinian armed factions and Israel. The first Qassam produced was the Qassam-1, with a maximum range of 5 kilometers (3.1 mi) and carrying a 5 5 kilograms (11 lb) warhead.

Hamas launched the first Qassam-1 rocket attack in October 2001, during the Second Intifada. The first time Palestinians launched rockets into Israel, rather than at an Israeli settlement in the Gaza Strip, occurred on February 10, 2002. One of the rockets landed in Kibbutz Saad. Two Qassam rockets landed in the southern Israeli city of Sderot, the first city hit, on March 5, 2002. Some rockets have hit as far as the edge of Ashkelon. By the end of December 2008, a total of 15 people had been killed by Palestinian rockets since attacks began in 2001. Since 2000, Palestinian rockets, which include the Qassam, alongside others such as the Grad rocket, have been used to kill 22 Israeli citizens and one Thai national (as of January 9, 2009).

== Description ==
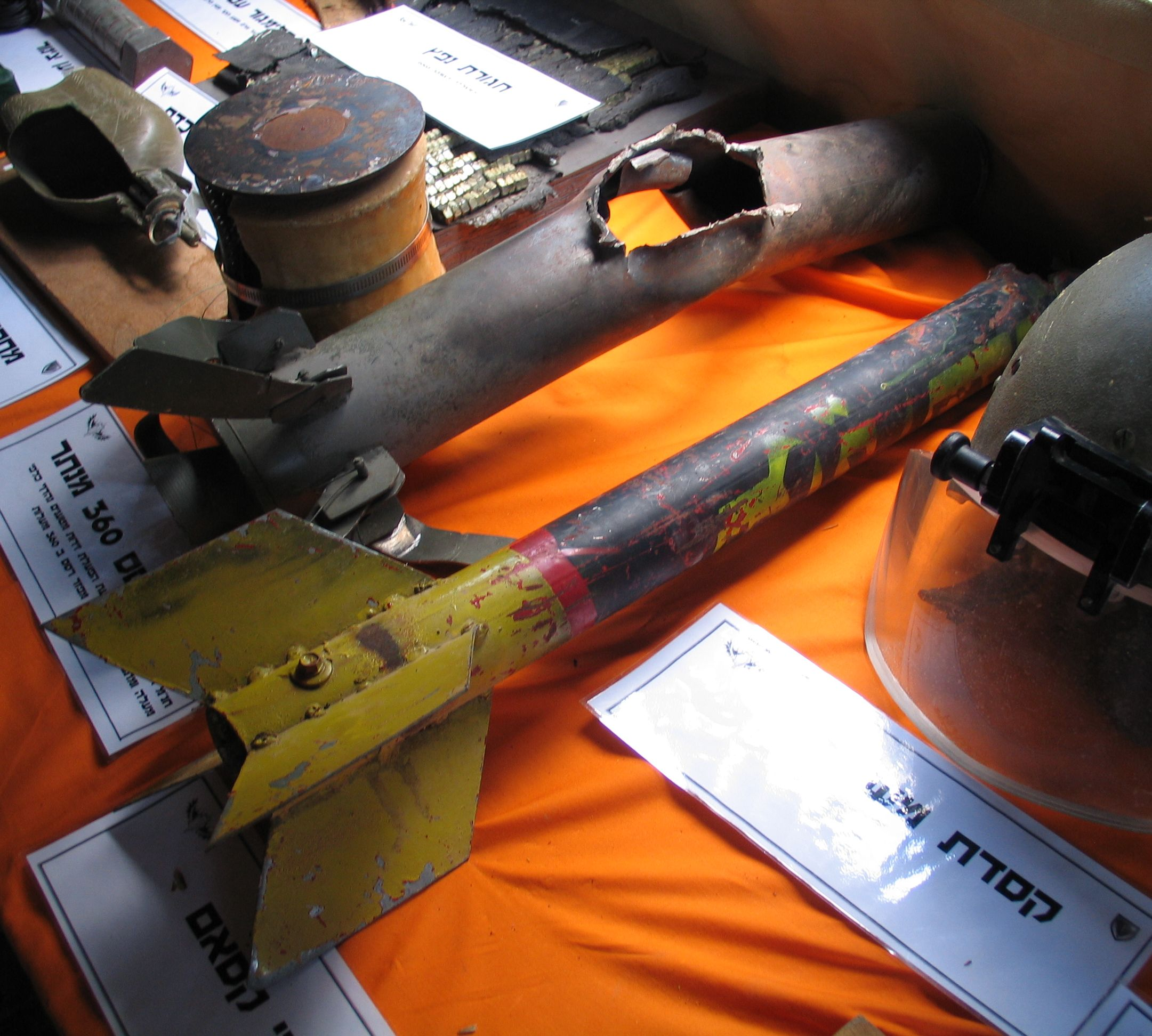
Rockets being exhibited

The Qassam rocket is the best-known type of rocket deployed by Palestinian militants, mainly against Israeli civilians, but also some military targets during the Second Intifada of the Israeli–Palestinian conflict. According to Human Rights Watch, Qassam rockets are too inaccurate and prone to malfunction to be used against specific military targets in or near civilian areas, and are mainly launched for the purpose of "harming civilians".

The utility of the Qassam rocket design is assumed to be ease and speed of manufacture, using common tools and components. To this end, the rockets are propelled by a solid mixture of sugar and potassium nitrate, a common fertilizer. The warhead is filled with smuggled or scavenged TNT and urea nitrate, another common fertilizer. The warhead's explosive material is similar to the civilian explosive ammonite.

The rocket consists of a steel cylinder, containing a rectangular block of the propellant. A steel plate which forms and supports the nozzles is then spot-welded to the base of the cylinder. The warhead consists of a simple metal shell surrounding the explosives, and is triggered by a fuse constructed using a simple firearm cartridge, spring and a nail.

Early designs used a single nozzle which screwed into the base; later rockets use a seven-nozzle design, with the nozzles drilled directly into the rocket baseplate. This alteration both increases the tolerance of the rocket to small nozzle design defects, and makes manufacture easier by allowing the use of a drill rather than a lathe during manufacture (because of the smaller nozzle size). Unlike many other rockets, the nozzles are not canted, which means the rocket does not spin about its longitudinal axis during flight. While this results in a significant decrease in accuracy, it greatly simplifies manufacture and the launch systems required.

The cost of the materials used for manufacturing each Qassam was up to $800 or €500 per rocket in 2009.

== Reactions ==
=== Israeli ===
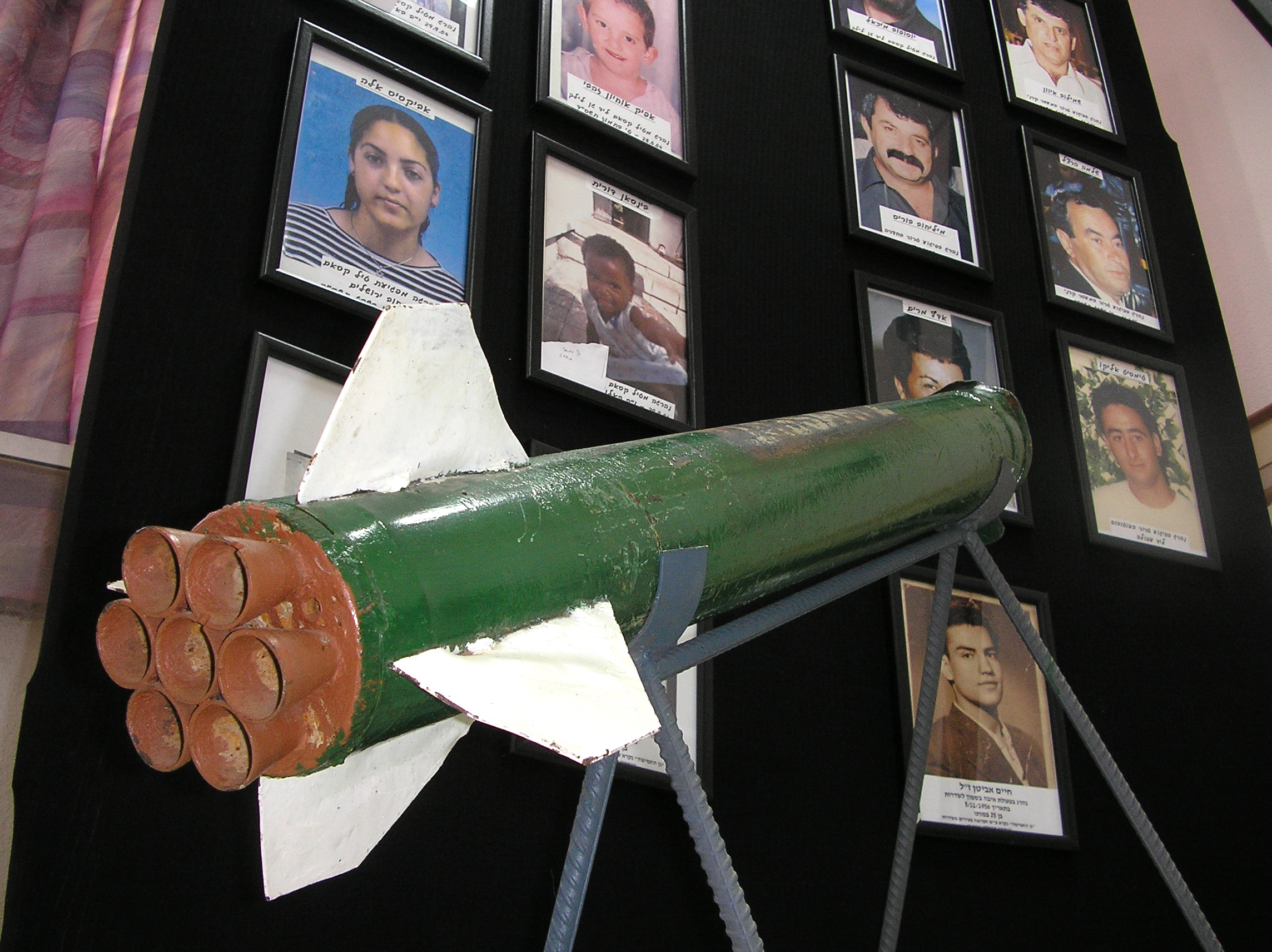
A Qassam rocket is displayed in Sderot town hall against a background of pictures of residents killed in rocket attacks

The introduction of the Qassam rocket was unexpected by Israeli politicians and military experts, and reactions have been mixed. In 2006, the Israeli Ministry of Defense viewed the Qassams as "more a psychological than physical threat." A 2008 study found that over half of Sderot's residents have been hurt, either physically or psychologically, by the use of Qassams. The Israel Defense Forces has reacted to the deployment of the Qassam rockets by deploying the Red Color early warning system in Sderot, Ashkelon, and other potential targets placed at risk. The system consists of an advanced radar that detects rockets as they are being launched, and loudspeakers warn civilians to take cover between 15 and 45 seconds before impact in an attempt to minimize the threat posed by the rockets. A system called Iron Dome, designed to intercept the rockets before they can hit their targets, has been in use since March 2011. A system based on lasers (Nautilus) was researched in a joint Israeli-American project in the early 2000s, but was discontinued.

=== Palestinian ===
In 2012, Palestinian president Mahmoud Abbas stated "There is no justification for rockets from Gaza or anywhere else," adding that "Rocket attacks are in vain because they do not bring peace any closer."

=== Human rights groups ===
Amnesty International labeled Palestinian groups' use of rockets during the 2014 Gaza war as a "war crime", stating that "Palestinian armed groups operating in the Gaza Strip fired thousands of indiscriminate rockets and mortars into Israel; firing munitions which cannot be aimed accurately into civilian areas is a war crime, and statements by Hamas and Palestinian armed groups also indicates that some attacks were intended to kill or injure civilians."

Amnesty additionally "has documented that Palestinian armed groups have stored munitions in and fired indiscriminate rockets from residential areas in the Gaza Strip, and available evidence indicates that they continue to do both during the current hostilities, in violation of international humanitarian law (..) Under international humanitarian law, (..) Parties to the conflict must also take necessary precautions to protect civilians in their power from the effects of attack. This includes avoiding, to the maximum extent feasible, co-locating military objectives in the vicinity of densely populated civilian neighbourhoods. This means the parties should avoid endangering civilians by storing ammunition in, and launching attacks from, populated civilian areas."

Human Rights Watch has called the use of Qassam rockets by Hamas against civilians and civilian targets illegal under international law. In a 2005 statement, the group said that "such weapons are therefore indiscriminate when used against targets in population centers. The absence of Israeli military forces in the areas where rockets have hit, as well as statements by leaders of Palestinian armed groups that population centers were being targeted, indicate that the armed groups deliberately attacked Israeli civilians and civilian objects." In another 2005 statement, the group noted that as the ruling authority of Gaza, Hamas was obligated to uphold the laws of war and should appropriately punish those responsible for serious violations". The international community considers indiscriminate attacks on civilians and civilian structures that do not discriminate between civilians and military targets as illegal under international law.

== See also ==
- Ababeel1
- Improvised artillery in the Syrian Civil War
