= Emad Akel =

Militant leader of Hamas (1971–1993)

- عماد عقل

2nd Commander of the Izz al-Din al-Qassam Brigades
- In office 1993 – 24 November 1993
- Preceded by: Saleh al-Arouri
- Succeeded by: Yahya Ayyash

Personal details
- Born: 19 June 1971
- Died: 24 November 1993 (aged 22)
- Military career
- Allegiance: Al Qassam Brigades (Hamas)
- Branch: Izz ad-Din al-Qassam Brigades

Emad Akel also spelled Imad Akel (Arabic: عماد عقل, 1971–1993) was a commander of the Izz al-Din al-Qassam Brigades, the military wing of Hamas. He was killed by the Israel Defense Forces.

== Biography ==
Emad was born on 19 June 1971 in the Jabalia Refugee Camp in the northern Gaza Strip, to a family who immigrated there after the 1948 war from the village of Barair (Arabic: برعير), near Al-Majdal, where Ashkelon is today.

According to his older brother Adel, Emad was more interested in geography than in politics. He was reportedly the most academic student in the class at his elementary school and then assistant to his teacher in preparatory school. Some of his relatives were arrested, including his cousin Walid. Distant relatives were killed by Israeli troops in firefights. Afterward, he joined Hamas. On 23 September 1988, Emad and his brother were arrested for their Hamas membership.

After being released from prison, he became a fighter in the Gaza Strip. He became known as "the ghost" for his many disguises, including dressing up as a Jewish settler with a skullcap. In the early 1990s, Akel topped Israel's most wanted list for his suspected role in killing 11 Israeli soldiers, an Israeli civilian and four Palestinian informants in a series of attacks. According to his brother, Emad noted in 1991, "The Israelis are after me and they will go on following me until I fight back and then I will die at their hands and, for this reason, I will go to paradise."

Akel was a commander and mentor of Mohammed Deif, who followed Akel as the commander of the al-Qassam Brigades in 1993.

=== Death ===
On 24 November 1993, a Palestinian informant reported Akel's location to the Israel Defense Forces. Akel was hiding with other Hamas soldiers in a house in Shuja'iyya in the Gaza Strip. After several hours of the siege of the neighborhood, Akel tried to escape and was immediately shot by Israeli soldiers. At the time of his death, journalist Robert Fisk called Akel "the most important Hamas activist ever shot dead by the Israeli army." Israeli soldiers buried Akel in a cemetery in the Jabalia Camp. To avoid demonstrations by supporters of Akel, they carried out the burial at night.

In 1995, Hamas arrested senior member Walid Hamdiya for providing information to Israel that led to the death of Akel and four other senior Hamas military leaders. In 2002, Hamdiya was sentenced to death by firing squad.

== Legacy ==
In 2009, Hamas released a biopic celebrating Akel's life and martyrdom. The film was written by Hamas strongman Mahmoud al-Zahar and the interior minister, Fathi Hamad. Majed Jundiyeh is the director of the film.

== See also ==
- Ahmad Yasin
- Salah Shehade
- Yahya Ayyash
