= Palestinian rocket arsenal =

Rockets and missiles in the Arab–Israeli conflict

The Palestinian rocket arsenal used in the Arab–Israeli conflict includes a wide range of rockets and missiles, varying in design, size and payload capacity. Palestinian rockets include those locally made in Gaza and the West Bank as well as weapons smuggled from Iran and Syria. Rockets are used in attacks on Israel, mostly to target Israeli civilian centers in addition to Israeli military posts. Various Palestinian groups have used rockets against Israel including Fatah, Hamas, Islamic Jihad, as well as left-wing groups. Rockets are one of the main weapons produced by Palestinian militant and terrorist groups.

== Types of rockets ==
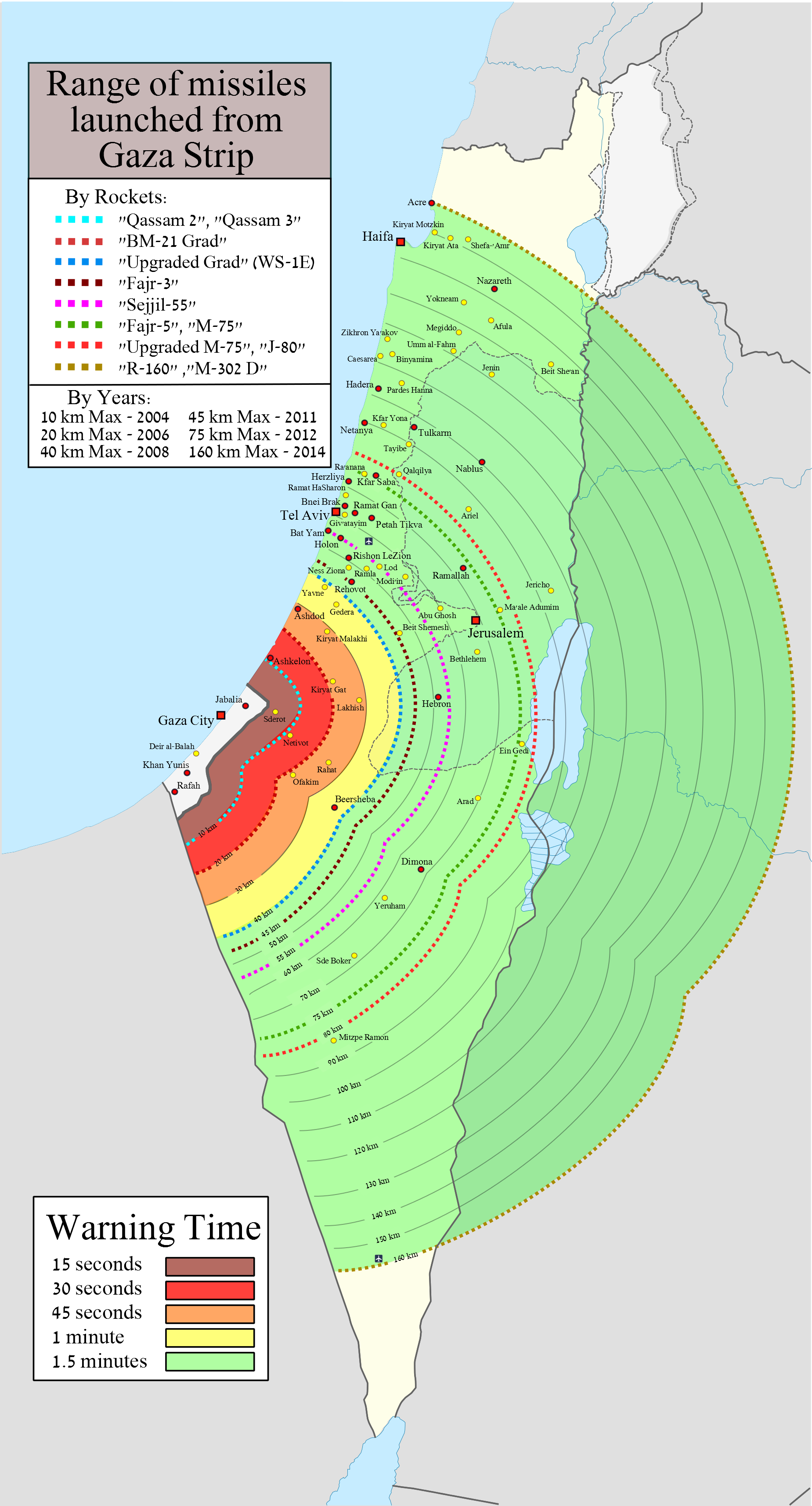
Range of Palestinian rockets (shot from Gaza)

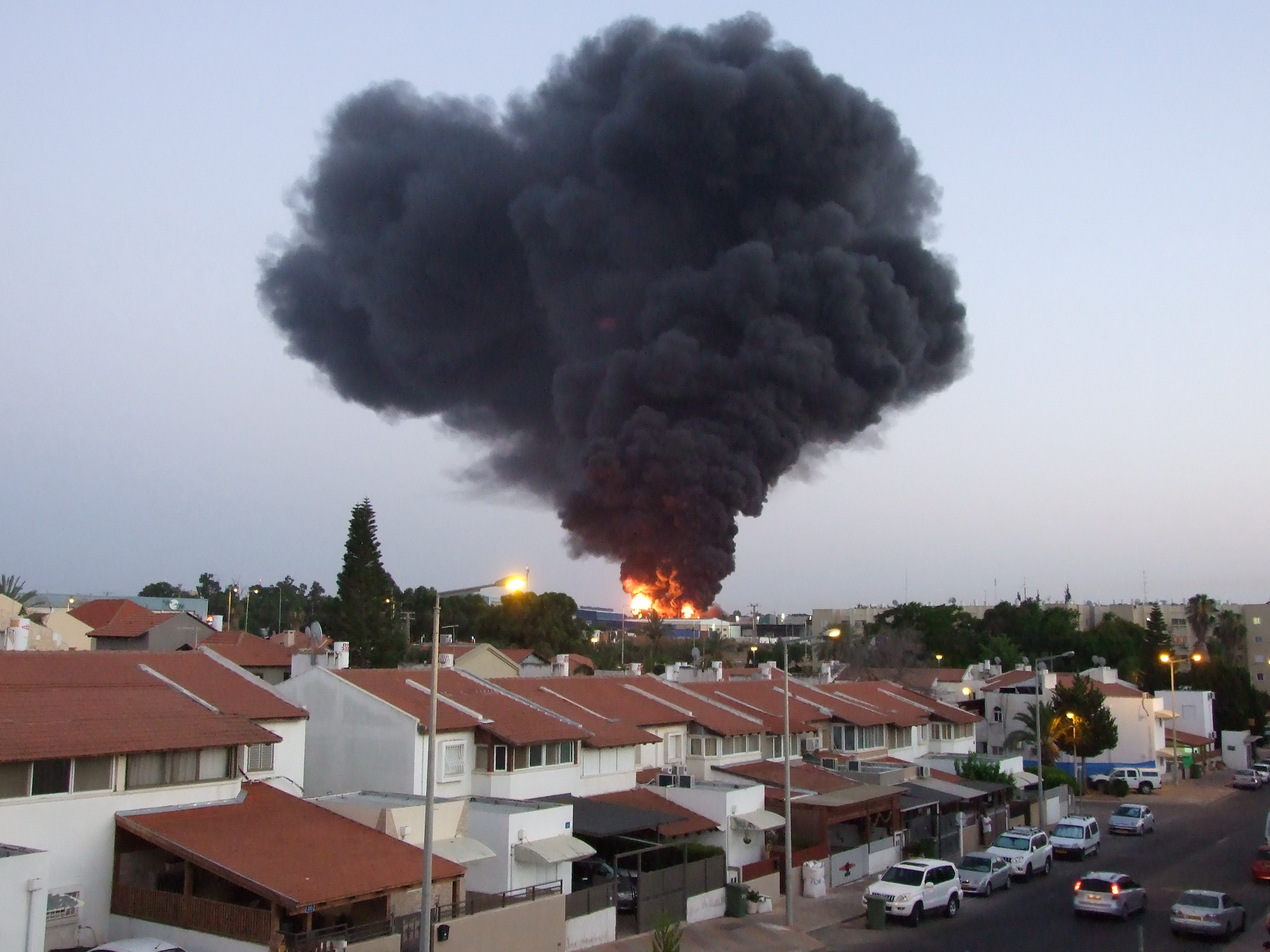
Sderot factory bursting into flames following rocket strike

- al Nasser – used by Popular Resistance Committees and left-wing militant organizations
  - al Nasser-3
  - al Nasser-4
- al Quds – a homemade rocket used by Islamic Jihad
  - Al Quds 101
  - Al Quds 102
- Arafat used by the Al Aqsa Martyrs Brigade and Fatah, launched from the West Bank
  - Arafat 1
  - Arafat 2
- Aqsa-3 – used by the Al Aqsa Martyrs Brigade and Fatah
- Bahaa – developed by Al Aksa Martyrs Brigade, named after Saed Bahaa, launched from West Bank
- Cenin – a rocket used by Fatah
- Fajr-5 – an Iranian artillery rocket first developed in the 1990s
- M-75 – Gazan produced Fajr-5 rocket, used in attacks on Tel Aviv, Israel's most populated city. Hamas has produced the M-75 rockets in local workshops using the drawings and documentation supplied by Iran. The location of the workshops is unknown, though Hamas has displayed their production on Gaza television stations.
- Jenin-1 – used by Fatah
- Kafah – used by Fatah
- Katyusha – an old term now used to denote the Soviet BM-21 Grad rocket launcher and the type of rocket fired from it, first used in 2006 in a strike that killed two Israeli Bedouin Arabs; at the time the Katyusha's range exceeded the Qassam. Soviet designation for the rocket originally was M-21-OF, later changed to 9M22.
- Arash - an Iranian development of the Grad rocket
- KN-103 – rocket referenced in threat by Fatah, use and existence unknown
- M-302 (M302), Palestinian designation R160 (R-160) – a Chinese designed, Syrian made rocket, used in attacks on cities near Jerusalem and Haifa
- Qassam (or Kassam) – a Gazan produced rocket used by Hamas
  - Qassam 1 – weighs 35 kilograms and is 180 centimeters long
  - Qassam 2 – weighs 40 kilograms and is 180 centimeters long
  - Qassam 3 – weighs 50 kilograms and is 220 centimeters long
  - Qassam 4 – weighs 40–50 kilograms and is 244 centimeters long
- Saria-2 – used by Tanzim
- Sumoud – in use by the Popular Front for the Liberation of Palestine
- Ayyash-250 - with a range of 250 km (155 miles) - used by Hamas
- Badr-3 - unveiled by Palestinian Islamic Jihad in 2019, carries a 300–400 kg warhead

=== Anti-tank missiles ===
- Yasin RPG – used by Hamas
- al Bana RPG – used and developed by Hamas, in use by other factions
- al Batar RPG – used and developed by Hamas, in use by other factions

=== Rocket launchers ===
- al Quds-3 Multiple Rocket Launcher – in use by Hamas & Islamic Jihad

== Impact ==
As of July 2014 Palestinian attacks on Israel using rockets have killed 28 people, mostly civilians, and injured more than 1,900 people, but their main effect is their creation of widespread psychological trauma and disruption of daily life among the Israeli populace. Medical studies in Sderot, the Israeli city closest to the Gaza Strip, have documented a post-traumatic stress disorder incidence among young children of almost 50%, as well as high rates of depression and miscarriage.

Israel Iron Dome is Israel's first line of defense against Palestinian rockets, demonstrating an effectiveness of around 90%.

== See also ==
- Palestinian rocket attacks
