= Ababeel1 =

Drone used Hamas

Ababeel-1 (A1)

General information
- Type: Reconnaissance, UAV
- National origin: Palestine
- Manufacturer: Hamas (al-Qassam Brigades)
- Designer: Nidal Farahat, Mohamed Zouari, & others.
- Primary user: al-Qassam Brigades

The Ababeel-1 or "A1" (Arabic: أبابيل1) is the first Palestinian reconnaissance unmanned aerial vehicle (UAV), armed drone, made in Gaza by al-Qassam Brigades Industries, the military wing of the Islamic Resistance Movement (Hamas).

== Background ==
Mohamed Zouari, an aerospace engineer originally from Sfax, left Tunisia for Syria in 1991 in order to escape the wave of repression of the Islamic political party Ennahdha by the Zine El Abidine Ben Ali regime. With knowledge of aeronautics and the design of drones, He then joined the Izz al-Din al-Qassam Brigades, Hamas' military wing, where he supervised its unmanned aircraft manufacturing program, ultimately leading to the development of Ababeel1. The first battlefield use of the Ababeel1 was in the Gaza War of 2014.

== See also ==
- Palestinian domestic weapons production
- Qassam rocket
- Yasin (RPG)
