= Egypt and the Gaza war =

Egypt, which shares a 12-kilometer land border with the Gaza Strip, has largely adopted a neutral and non-interventionist position toward the Gaza war. Its involvement has been limited to certain evacuations of wounded children and the exit of individuals able to bear the high costs required to facilitate extremely limited crossings.

== Background ==
Following the Six Day War in 1967, Israel began an occupation of the Egyptian Sinai Peninsula. In the late 1970s, Egypt and Israel signed the Camp David Accords, establishing peace between the two countries and returning the Sinai to Egypt. In the 21st century, ever since Hamas' takeover of Gaza in the mid-2000s, the Egyptian government has frequently acted as a mediator between the Israeli government and Palestinian factions during conflicts. After seizing power from the Muslim Brotherhood-affiliated Mohamed Morsi in the 2013 Egyptian coup d'état, the Egyptian government under Abdel Fattah el-Sisi has been ideologically opposed to Hamas, who are linked to the Brotherhood.

== Egyptian government ==
=== Overview of the positions of the Egyptian government ===
According to Mohamed Nabil El Bendary of the Stimson Center, the Egyptian government's position to the Gaza War was an attempt to balance its desire to maintain its close geopolitical relationship with the United States, its desire to avoid excessive escalation of tensions with Israel, and its longstanding role as a mediator in the Israeli-Palestinian conflict with its fear of a mass displacement of Gazans into the Sinai Peninsula, strong popular support for Palestinian nationalism among Egyptians, and its longstanding stated commitment to the establishment of an independent Palestinian state.

Egypt maintained a low-profile response when Israeli forces seized control of the Rafah crossing on the Egyptian-Palestinian border in May 2024, in a move widely regarded as a violation of the Egypt–Israel peace treaty.

Egypt also refrained from expressing any substantive opposition to Israel's violations in the Gaza Strip. The closest gesture resembling a form of protest may have been the reported delay in the arrival of the Israeli ambassador to Cairo as of May 2025. Meanwhile, the Egyptian ambassador remained in Tel Aviv until his departure from the post in September 2024.

On 16 June 2026, El-Sisi accused Israel of extending the yellow line boundaries while the world was distracted by the Iran war, demanding that it stop immediately.

=== Peace efforts ===
On 27 October 2024, el-Sisi proposed a two-day truce in exchange for the release of four Israeli hostages and a number of Palestinian detainees.

=== Post-war plans ===
The Egyptian government has been involved in training Palestinian Authority security officials for a potential post-war PA takeover of Gaza.

=== Egyptian military build-up in the Sinai Peninsula ===
According to Sarah El Sirgany of CNN, tensions between the Israeli and Egyptian governments have grown since the outbreak of the war, especially over "whether Cairo has deployed more soldiers and military equipment to the Sinai than permitted under the security provisions that followed the 1979 peace treaty with Israel." Mohamed Saad Khiralla of PEN Sweden has also noted rising tensions over the Sinai, claiming that "At the official level, the Egyptian regime feigned cordiality with Israel. But since the war began, its media and institutions have consistently broadcast antagonism. Now, Egyptians are openly debating the prospect of future confrontation, particularly as Cairo eyes new arms purchases from China, North Korea, and others and as military activity intensifies in the Sinai." In April 2025, the Egyptian government deployed tanks to the Sinai, violating the Camp David Accords. A senior Egyptian military official told the Middle East Monitor in September 2025 that "Egypt’s army is on the highest state of alert we’ve seen in years," with the number of Egyptian soldiers in the northern Sinai reaching 40 000.

=== Gazan refugees ===
The Egyptian government has largely refused to accept refugees from Gaza, and has expressed significant opposition to any mass displacement of Gazans into the Sinai Peninsula. According to Rory McCarthy of Durham University, this position is motivated by three factors: the government's desire not to be complicit in potential ethnic cleansing as well as its concerns such a displacement would negatively affect the prospects of establishing an independent Palestinian state; its fears that such a displacement would destabilise the Sinai and re-ignite the Islamist Sinai insurgency, particularly as Islamist groups like Hamas remain strong in Gaza; and finally that such a displacement would destabilise the Egyptian economy, especially as Egypt already plays host to a significant population of immigrants and has been negatively affected by the war.

== Political impact ==
In July 2025, Amr Salah Mohamed of the Atlantic Council wrote that, although Egyptian politics showed a slight trend towards increased openness in early 2023, following the outbreak of the Gaza War, "national debate has shifted from reform to national security," while "deepening ideological fractures among Egypt’s intellectuals and secular opposition, further discrediting their democratic narrative while lending credibility to conspiracy theories, and restoring the battered image of Egypt’s military as the nation’s ultimate protector."

Amira Oron of the Israeli Institute for National Security Studies has written that the war contributed to "the growing prominence of the Palestinian issue on Egypt’s national agenda, which resonates deeply within Egyptian public opinion," citing the December 2023 Egyptian presidential election where "al-Sisi’s statements in various forums throughout November and December 2023 showed how effectively he leveraged the war as an issue of national security for Egypt to serve his campaign and restore his standing among the Egyptian public."

Journalist Hossam el-Hamalawy of the Middle East Monitor wrote in December 2024 that "street activism, which experienced a rare, sudden revival in October 2023 with the outbreak of the Gaza war, was quickly crushed by security services, who ensured the streets remained quiet. A year later, more than 100 people are still in prison for taking part in peaceful solidarity actions with the Palestinian people." According to Jessica Genauer of Flinders University, public protests in Egypt against the Gaza War "have been tightly controlled. And notably, they have not been permitted at Tahrir Square, the heart of the Arab Spring protests."

== Economic impact ==
A May 2024 report by the United Nations Development Programme warned that the Gaza War was "straining Egypt's economic reform and development trajectory," with adverse effects particularly on tourism and the Suez Canal. An October 2024 report from the Atlantic Council noted that Suez Canal revenue dropped by 47% in January 2024, significantly contributing to projections "that annual [GDP] growth may fall between 0.5 and 0.6 percentage points per year by 2025."

David Butter of the European Institute of the Mediterranean, however, has argued that the economic impact of the war on Egypt has been relatively limited, as Egypt, like Jordan, "have also received substantial financial support from international institutions and Gulf Arab states," also noting that the war "stopped short of triggering a regional escalation that could have affected global energy supplies."

== International human rights ==
On 18 October 2023, during a meeting in Cairo with German Chancellor Olaf Scholz, President Abdel Fattah el-Sisi made controversial remarks suggesting that Israel could relocate civilians to the Negev Desert temporarily while dealing with armed groups in the Gaza Strip. He further stated that the displacement of Palestinians toward Egypt would turn Sinai into a launching ground for armed operations against Israel, which, in response, would defend itself by striking targets on Egyptian territory. On 25 December 2023, it was reported that Hamas and Islamic Jihad rejected an Egyptian proposal that called for them to relinquish authority in exchange for a permanent ceasefire. The factions declined to make any concessions beyond the release of additional hostages.

Egypt refused to allow foreign solidarity activists to pass through to the Rafah crossing and deported them to their countries. The government claims that this policy stems from concerns about forced displacement and terrorism in Sinai, as well as assertions that the settlement of Palestinians there could lead to the establishment of a state in the peninsula. Notably, Egypt has no historical precedent of hosting Palestinian refugees on a wide scale.

== International criticism of the Egyptian government ==
The Egyptian government’s stance has been described as complicit in genocide, exposing it to possible prosecution in international courts due to its refusal to intervene to protect civilians or to admit those subjected to or at risk of persecution.

The Egyptian government's positions on the war have deepened tensions between it and Hamas, particularly after the Egyptian government shifted its policy to begin pressuring Hamas to commit to post-war disarmament during ceasefire negotiations. Hamas official Khalil al-Hayya has accused Egypt of complicity in Gaza's humanitarian crisis, addressing "the Egyptian people and their leaders" by asking "Are your brothers in Gaza dying of hunger while they are at your border, close to you?"

Protests have been held outside Egyptian embassies and consulates in several cities, (Note: Ankara, Baghdad, Beirut, Berlin, Brussels, Copenhagen, Damascus, Dublin, Helsinki, Istanbul, Johannesburg, London, Madrid, Milan, Oslo, Prague, Rabat, Stockholm, Tokyo, Tripoli, The Hague, Tunis, and Washington D.C.) calling for the opening of the Rafah crossing to allow humanitarian aid into Gaza.

== See also ==
- Egypt–Israel relations
- Egypt–Palestine relations
- International reactions to the Gaza war
