= Palestinian domestic weapons production =

Even before the outbreak of the Al-Aqsa Intifada, various insurgent Palestinian (Palestinian resistance) groups built domestically-produced weapons for attacks against Israel. Most of the effort has been in the production of unguided artillery rockets, though Hamas has built its own versions of anti-tank missiles and rocket-propelled grenades (RPGs). Though usually smuggled across the Egyptian border into the Gaza Strip and to a lesser extent Jordanian border into the West Bank, various small arms are believed to be produced in the Palestinian territories.

On 14 August 2008 the Popular Resistance Committees showed off the Nasser-4 missile, an upgraded version of the existing Nasser-3.

== Known equipment ==
=== Aircraft ===
- Ababeel1 - reconnaissance and armed drone.

=== Rockets ===
Multiple Rocket Launcher

- al Quds-3 MRL (Hamas & Palestinian Islamic Jihad Movement)

Short Range Artillery Rockets

- Qassam Type 1, 2, 3, & 4 (Hamas)
- al Quds Type 101 & 2 (Palestinian Islamic Jihad Movement)
- al Nasser-3 (Popular Resistance Committees)
- al Nasser-4 (Popular Resistance Committees)
- Saria-2 (Tanzim)
- Kafah (Fatah)
- Jenin-1 (Fatah)
- Arafat Type 1 & 2 (Al Aqsa Martyrs Brigade)
- Aqsa-3 (Al Aqsa Martyrs Brigade)
- Al-Samoud (Popular Front for the Liberation of Palestine)

Anti-Tank Missiles

- Yasin RPG (Hamas)
- al Bana RPG (Hamas developed, in use by other factions)
- al Batar RPG (Hamas developed, in use by other factions)

=== Mortars ===
- Sariya-1 240mm Mortar (Fatah & Popular Front for the Liberation of Palestine)

=== Small arms ===
- Carlo (submachine gun)

== Bibliography ==
- Horowitz, Adam; Ratner, Lizzy; Weiss, Philip (2011). The Goldstone Report: The Legacy of the Landmark Investigation of the Gaza Conflict. Bold Type Books. ISBN 978-1568586410.
