= Al-Bana =

Palestinian anti-tank rocket launcher

The al-Bana (Arabic: البنا) rocket launcher is a weapon developed by Hamas's Izz ad-Din al-Qassam Brigades under the direction of Adnan al-Ghoul and Mohammed Deif. Made from raw material and equipment smuggled into the Gaza Strip using tunnels in Rafah, named after Hassan al-Banna founder of the Muslim brotherhood, the al-Bana was the first example, during the Second Intifada, of Hamas' engineers capacity. It was to launch Palestinian rocket attacks on Israel.

The shoulder-fired al-Bana was extensively used during Israel Defense Forces incursions to fight against tanks and armored vehicles. The al-Bana was replaced, in 2003, by the more elaborated Batar and is no longer used by Hamas. Slightly modified versions of the al-Bana were made and used by other Palestinian militant groups. In 2004, Hamas engineers provided the group with a new and sophisticated shoulder-fired rocket launcher, the Yasin.

== See also ==
- Palestinian domestic weapons production
