= Mohamed Zouari =

Tunisian drone expert (1967–2016)

- Born: January 1967; Sfax, Tunisia
- Died: 15 December 2016 (aged 49); Sfax, Tunisia
- Occupation: Aerospace engineer
- Notable work: Ababeel1 drones

Mohamed Zouari (Arabic: محمد الزواري; January 1967 – 15 December 2016) was a Tunisian aerospace engineer working for the Izz ad-Din al-Qassam Brigades, Hamas' military wing. He was assassinated in his hometown of Sfax on 15 December 2016 when he was shot dead in a drive-by shooting that has been widely attributed to the Mossad.

== Biography ==
Mohamed Mahmoud Zouari was born in January 1967 in to a conservative Muslim family in Sfax, Tunisia. He was one of the followers of the Islamic political party Ennahdha. He left Tunisia in 1991 to Syria to escape the wave of political repression by the Zine El Abidine Ben Ali regime.

Having gained knowledge of aeronautics and of the design of drones, he joined the ranks of the Izz al-Din al-Qassam Brigades, the Hamas armed wing, where he supervised its unmanned aircraft manufacturing program. The unmanned aircraft developed in this program, the Ababeel1, were first used on the battlefield during the Gaza war of 2014. Zouari returned to Tunisia after the Tunisian Revolution of 2010-11.

== Assassination ==
On 15 December 2016, after getting in his car and just about to drive away, a truck drove up and blocked the way. Two shooters opened fire with silenced firearms, firing about twenty shots. Zouari was mortally wounded, as three bullet hits to the chest turned out to be fatal. After the assassination, the surveillance system of a restaurant near the place of the assassination had its video recordings erased by an unknown external party.

Hamas confirmed Mohamed Zouari's membership of the Izz al-Din al-Qassam Brigades and the role he played in the development of the Ababil drone in a statement released on its website on 17 December 2016. It also accused Israel of being behind the assassination and promised to avenge Zouari.

The Tunisian Government announced that it will prosecute, both nationally and abroad, any person involved in Zouari's assassination.

Asked about the assassination, Israeli Defense Minister Avigdor Liberman said that Israel would continue to defend its interests.

== See also ==
- Nidal Fat'hi Rabah Farahat
- Operation Wooden Leg
- Khalil al-Wazir
- Salah Khalaf
