= Adnan al-Ghoul =

Palestinian militant leader (c. 1962 – 2004)

- Adnan al-Ghoul
- Native name: عدنان الغول
- Born: c. 1962
- Died: October 21, 2004 (aged 41–42) Gaza
- Cause of death: Assassination by airstrike
- Allegiance: Hamas
- Branch: Izz ad-Din al-Qassam Brigades
- Conflicts: Al-Aqsa Intifada

Adnan Al-Ghoul (c. 1962 – 21 October 2004) (Arabic: عدنان الغول) was the assistant of Mohammed Deif, the leader of the Izz ad-Din al-Qassam Brigades, the armed wing of Hamas. He was killed in a targeted killing along with Imad Abbas when an Israeli Air Force AH-64 helicopter attacked their car in Gaza on 21 October 2004. He is seen as a martyr by Hamas members.

Adnan Al-Ghoul was one of the senior operatives in Hamas' military apparatus. He specialized in explosives and among other attacks was behind the 1995 attack at the Beit Lid junction in central Israel, and the 1996 bombing at Dizengoff Center in the heart of Tel Aviv, together responsible for the deaths of 32 Israelis.

Adnan was not an "ordinary rank-and-file" operative but rather a top-ranking of Hamas' military apparatus in the Gaza Strip. He specialized in the preparation of IEDs and developed the Qassam rocket system for Hamas (earning him the nickname "father of the Qassam"). He was the right-hand man of Muhammad Deif, head of Hamas' military wing, and had an important role in Hamas' plot to sabotage the Oslo Accords. For example, Al-Ghoul was involved in manufacturing the bombs used in the double attack at the Beit Lid junction in the center of Israel on 22 January, 1995, in which 22 Israelis were killed. He also prepared the explosive belt for the 1996 Purim suicide bombing at Dizengoff Center in the heart of Tel Aviv, in which ten Israeli civilians were killed. He died in an Israeli Air Force targeted killing on 21 October 2004.

Identified by the Israel Defense Forces (IDF) as Hamas' top bombmaker, he joined the organisation soon after its creation in 1988. He then served as an assistant to Izz ad-Din al-Qassam Brigades's top engineer, Yahya Ayyash. Al-Ghoul took over Ayyash's role in 1996, after his mentor's targeted killing.

Early in the Al-Aqsa Intifada, Al-Ghoul developed the Qassam rocket. Al-Ghoul also masterminded the development of weapons made from raw material and equipment smuggled into the Gaza Strip using tunnels in Rafah, on the border with Egypt. Among those weapons, anti-tank rockets such as the Al-Bana, the Batar, and later the Yasin were often used by Hamas in its attacks against the Israeli army in Gaza, as well as for defense purposes during IDF's incursions.

Al-Ghoul lived in hiding and never spoke to the media. Pictures of the 46-year-old father of four were released by Hamas only after his death. On 26 September 2003, he reportedly attended a meeting with Mohammed Deif, Ismail Haniyeh, one of Hamas' political leaders, and the organisation's spiritual leader, Sheik Ahmed Yasin, when Israeli forces bombed the house where they gathered. Al-Ghoul's eldest son Bilal was killed in a 2001 air strike in Gaza, and his second son Mohammed was killed the following year along with a cousin during a botched raid in the family home in Maghazi, south of Gaza City.

Although the Izz ad-Din al-Qassam Brigades, for security reasons, withheld at the time the identities of the engineers that were involved with Al-Ghoul in overseeing the production of weapons for the group, it was disclosed in March 2006 that Abdel Mo'ti Abu Daf was, along with imad Abbas, Al-Ghoul's top assistant. Daf died on 26 February 2006 after a grenade accidentally detonated during a training.
