= Fursan Khalifa =

Hamas military commander (1983–2023)

Fursan Mahmoud Abdullah Khalifa
- Native name: فرسان محمود عبد الله خليفة
- Born: 8 April 1983; Tulkarm, West Bank
- Died: 25 November 2023 (aged 40) Gaza Strip
- Cause of death: Targeted bombing
- Buried: Tulkarm, West Bank
- Allegiance: Hamas
- Military: al-Qassam Brigades
- Service years: 2000–2003; 2011–2023
- Rank: Military Commander
- Conflicts: Second Intifada; 2012 Gaza War; 2014 Gaza War; Gaza war
- Education: al-Quds Open University
- Children: 4

Fursan Mahmoud Abdullah Khalifa (Arabic: فرسان محمود عبد الله خليفة; 8 April 1983 – 25 November 2023) was a senior Palestinian military commander of Hamas and the Qassam Brigades. He was born in Tulkarm to a prominent senior Hamas leader and military commander. He was in detention under the Israeli government from 2003 until 2011, when he was released as part of the Gilad Shalit prisoner exchange, and was deported to the Gaza Strip. He was later assassinated by the IDF during Operation Iron Sword.

== Early life and career ==
Khalifa was born in Tulkarm on 8 April 1983 in the Nur Shams refugee camp. During the Second Intifada, he became a prominent member of the al-Qassam Brigades and was captured and arrested by Israel on 7 April 2003 for conspiracy to commit terror attacks against it. Khalifa was found guilty of terrorism and sentenced to 24 years in prison. He was released by Israeli authorities in 2011 as one of over 1,000 Palestinian prisoners exchanged for the life of captured Israeli soldier Gilad Shalit, ending up in Gaza.

Following his release in 2011, Khalifa became one of the most prominent members of the West Bank division of the al-Qassam Brigades. He was the first official to be appointed a commander for the Northern West Bank. Israel alleged that after his release, he directed several terrorist attacks against Israeli civilians, and that he worked to strengthen the military infrastructure of Hamas in the West Bank.

== Personal life ==
Khalifa held a Bachelor's degree in "Social and Family Development" from Al-Quds Open University, and in 2021, obtained a Master's degree from their Institute of Sustainable Development.

== Death ==
Khalifa was killed as part of the Israeli response to the surprise invasion during the Israeli bombardment of the Gaza Strip. His body was found on November 25, 2023 under the rubble following the entry of Palestinian forces into a building following the temporary ceasefire. A funeral was held for him in his hometown of Tulkarm. Hamas confirmed the deaths of Khalifa and several other commanders on November 25.
