= Al-Qassam Brigades =

Military wing of Hamas

- كتائب الشهيد عز الدين القسام
- Emblem
- Commander: Vacant
- Deputy Commander: Vacant
- Spokesperson: Abu Obeida (since December 2025)
- Dates active: 1991–present
- Allegiance: Hamas
- Headquarters: Gaza Strip
- Active regions: Palestine; Israel; Lebanon; Syria
- Ideology: Sunni Islamism; Islamic fundamentalism Palestinian nationalism Anti-Zionism; Palestinian self-determination
- Political position: Right-wing
- Status: Active
- Size: 25,000–30,000+ (est.)
- Part of: Hamas (Palestine) Palestinian Joint Operations Room
- Wars: List of engagements: Arab–Israeli conflict; Israeli–Palestinian conflict; First Intifada; Second Intifada; 2006 Gaza–Israel conflict; Gaza War (2008–2009); 2012 Gaza War; 2014 Gaza War; 2021 Israel–Palestine crisis; Gaza war; October 7 attacks; Israeli incursions in the West Bank; Israeli invasion of the Gaza Strip; Israeli invasion of Syria; Israeli–Lebanese conflict; Israel–Hezbollah conflict (2023–present); 2024 Lebanon war; 2026 Lebanon war; Inter-Palestinian conflicts; Fatah–Hamas conflict; Battle of Gaza (2007); Salafi jihadist insurgency in the Gaza Strip; West Bank insurgency (2022–present); 2025 Gaza Strip anti-Hamas protests; Hamas–Popular Forces conflict
- Flag
- Website: www.alqassam.ps

Al-Qassam Brigades, also known as the Izz al-Din al-Qassam Brigades (EQB; (Note: Also spelt "Izz ad-Din al-Qassam Brigades", or "Izz al-Din al-Qassam Brigades", "Ezzedine al-Qassam Brigades". Usually shortened to "Qassam Brigades" or "Al-Qassam".) Arabic: كتائب الشهيد عز الدين القسام, romanized: Katāʾib ash-Shahīd ʿIzz ad-Dīn al-Qassām, lit. 'The Battalions of the Martyr Izz ad-Din al-Qassam'), are the military wing of the Sunni Islamist Palestinian nationalist organization, Hamas. Led by Mohammed Deif until his death on 13 July 2024, Al-Qassam Brigades are the largest and best-equipped militant organization operating within the Gaza Strip in recent years.

Created in mid-1991, they were at the time concerned with blocking the Oslo Accords negotiations. From 1994 to 2000, Al-Qassam Brigades have claimed responsibility for carrying out a number of attacks against Israelis.

At the beginning of the Second Intifada, the group became a central target of Israel. Al-Qassam Brigades operated several cells in the West Bank. Hamas retained a forceful presence in the Gaza Strip, generally considered its stronghold. Yahya Sinwar, Hamas political leader in the Gaza Strip from February 2017 to October 2024, was the main military leader in the Brigades in Gaza during the Gaza war. After his killing, Sinwar was succeeded by his brother Mohammed. Mohammed was assassinated in May 2025 and was succeeded by Izz al-Din al-Haddad, who was assassinated in May 2026. He was succeeded by Mohammed Odeh, who was assassinated that same month.

Al-Qassam Brigades are explicitly listed as a terrorist organization by the European Union, Australia, New Zealand, Egypt, and the United Kingdom. Though not explicitly mentioning EQB, the United States and Canada have designated its parent entity, Hamas, as a terrorist organization; former Brigade leader Mohammed Deif was classified as a Specially Designated Global Terrorist by the US under Executive Order 13224.

In July 2026, US president Donald Trump announced that his Board of Peace had reached an agreement to dissolve the Brigades.

== Overview ==
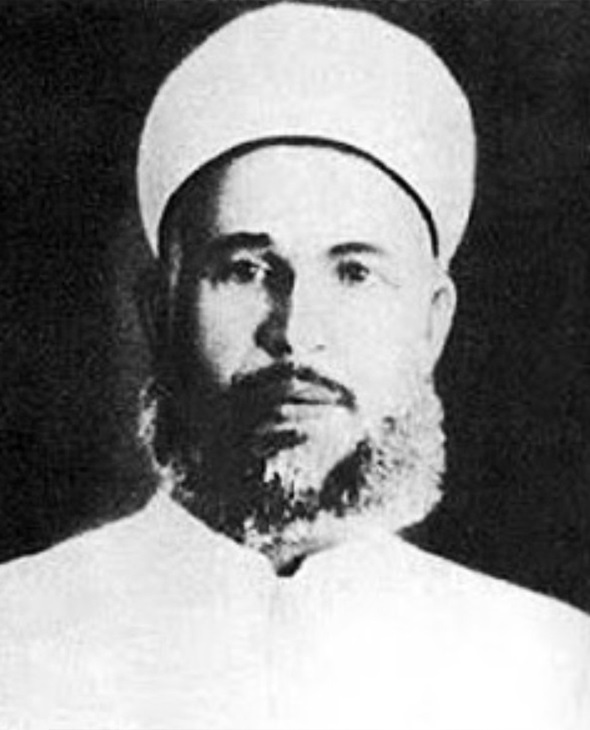
Izz ad-Din al-Qassam, Syrian Muslim preacher and leader in Arab nationalist resistance to British and French rule, a militant opponent of Zionism in the 1920s and 1930s

The Izz ad-Din al-Qassam Brigades are the military wing of the Palestinian organization Hamas, operating in the Gaza Strip. They were led by Mohammed Deif and, before his death on 10 March 2024, his deputy, Marwan Issa.

Al-Qassam Brigades were named after Izz ad-Din al-Qassam, a Muslim preacher and mujahid who fought in Syria, Libya, and Palestine. In 1930, al-Qassam organised and established the Black Hand, a militant organisation that was opposed to Zionism and British and French rule in the Levant. Before dying in a shootout with the Palestine Police Force in 1935, al-Qassam exhorted his followers to embrace martyrdom and fight until the last bullet, which turned him into a role model for Palestinian nationalists.

=== Aims and objectives ===
According to Al-Qassam Brigades, its aims are:

To contribute in the effort of liberating Palestine and restoring the rights of the Palestinian people under the sacred Islamic teachings of the Holy Quran, the Sunnah (traditions) of Prophet Muhammad (peace and blessings of Allah be upon him) and the traditions of Muslims rulers and scholars noted for their piety and dedication.

== Relation to political wing; commanders ==
The Izz al-Din al-Qassam Brigades are an integral part of Hamas. While they are subordinate to Hamas's broad political goals and its ideological objectives, they have a significant level of independence in decision making.

In 1997, political scientists Ilana Kass and Bard O'Neill described Hamas' relationship with the Brigades as reminiscent of Sinn Féin's relationship to the Provisional Irish Republican Army (IRA) and quoted a senior Hamas official: "The Izz al-Din al-Qassam Brigade is a separate armed military wing, which has its own leaders who do not take their orders [from Hamas] and do not tell us of their plans in advance."

Carrying the IRA analogy further, Kass and O'Neill argued that the separation of the political and military wings shielded Hamas' political leaders from responsibility for terrorism with the plausible deniability provided made Hamas an eligible representative for peace negotiations as had happened with Sinn Féin politician Gerry Adams.

The fighters' identities and positions in the group often remain secret until their death. Even when they fight against Israeli incursions, all the militiamen wear a characteristic black hood on which the group's green headband is attached. The Brigades operate on a model of independent cells. Even high-ranking members are often unaware of the activities of other cells. This allows the group to constantly regenerate after member deaths.

During the Second Intifada, the leaders of the group were targeted by numerous airstrikes that killed many members, including Salah Shehade and Adnan al-Ghoul. The former leader of the Brigades, Mohammed Deif, survived at least seven assassination attempts.

=== Notable members ===
- Mohammed Deif X
- Marwan Issa X
- Yahya Ayash X
- Adnan al-Ghoul X
- Salah Shehade X
- Wa'el Nassar X
- Ahmed Jabari X
- Zaher Jabarin
- Imad Abbas X
- Imad Akel X
- Nidal Fat'hi Rabah Farahat X
- Youssef Al-Sarkaji X
- Yunis Al Astal
- Muhammad Nazami Nasser †
- Mohammed Sinwar X
- Abu Obeida X
- Izz al-Din al-Haddad X
- Mohammed Odeh X

== History ==
=== Background ===
In 1984, Sheikh Ahmed Yassin, Ibrahim al-Makhadmeh, Sheikh Salah Shehada, and others began preparing for the establishment of an armed organization to resist Israeli control, with a focus on acquiring weapons for future resistance activities. Members of the group were, however, arrested and the weapons were confiscated.

In 1986, Shehada formed a network of resistance cells, called al-Mujahidun al-Filastiniun ('Palestinian fighters'), who targeted Israeli troops and "traitors." This network operated until 1989, with their most famous operation being the 1989 kidnapping and killing of two Israeli soldiers: Avi Sasportas and Ilan Saadon.

Hamas was officially established on 14 December 1987, forming other similar networks as al-Mujahidun al-Filastiniun, such as the Abdullah Azzam Brigades. In the summer of 1991, during the First Palestinian Intifada (1987–1994), the Izz ad-Din al-Qassam Brigades were established, with their first act being the assassination of the rabbi of Kfar Darom.

=== Contemporary operations and activities ===
The EQB's transition to a recognised militant organisation began during the establishment of the Oslo Accords to assist Hamas efforts in blocking them.

The year 2004 was pivotal in the development of Al-Qassam Brigades from a loosely-formed militia, into a structured organization with a defined chain of command. The Israel Defense Forces (IDF)'s assassinations of local leaders Ahmed Yassin and Abdel Aziz al-Rantisi resulted in decision-making power being transferred to leaders exiled in Damascus, which ultimately led to greater influence and funding from Syria, Iran, and Hezbollah.

The Gaza strip was divided into six or seven regional divisions, headed by a division commander with responsibility over defined sectors of territory. Each division commander oversaw regiment commanders and company commanders, who were responsible for small areas such as neighborhoods. A focus on tunnel warfare was selected as a primary means of combating the IDF.

On 3 August 2004, the first Yasin missile–a homebrew anti-tank rocket-propelled grenade–was launched. The group developed other homemade weapons, such as rocket launchers (al-Bana, Batar) and the Qassam rocket.

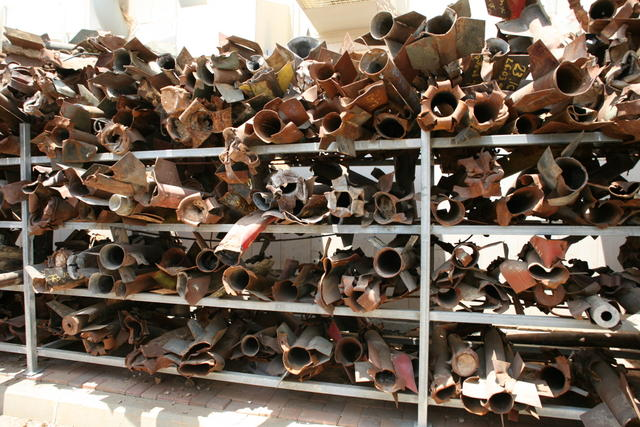
Qassam rockets launched from Gaza, on display at an Israeli police station at Sderot, 2009.

In 2003 and 2004, the Brigades in Gaza resisted incursions by the Israel Defense Forces (IDF), including the siege of Jabalya in October 2004.

In 2005, as President Mahmoud Abbas had taken direct control of the PA security forces, which were loyal to the president's Fatah movement, the Hamas government in the Gaza Strip formed a separate 3,000-strong paramilitary police force, called the Executive Force, consisting of Al-Qassam Brigades members.

In June 2006, Al-Qassam Brigades were involved in the operation which led to the capture of Israeli soldier Gilad Shalit. Al-Qassam Brigades engaged in heavy fighting in the Gaza Strip during Operation Summer Rains, launched by the IDF. It was the first time in over 18 months that the brigades were actively involved in fighting against Israeli soldiers. In May 2007, the brigades acknowledged they lost 192 fighters during the operation.

In January 2007, Abbas outlawed the Executive Force and ordered that its then-6,000 members be incorporated into the PA security forces under his command. The order was resisted by the Hamas government, which instead announced plans to double the size of the force to 12,000 men. Al-Qassam Brigades and the Executive Force took part in the Hamas takeover of Gaza in June 2007.

In June 2008, Egypt brokered a ceasefire, which lasted until 4 November when Israeli forces crossed into Gaza and killed six Hamas fighters. This resulted in an increase in rocket attacks on Israel, going from two in September and October to 190 in November 2008. Both sides said the other had broken the truce.

In July 2026, US President Donald Trump said that his Board of Peace had reached an agreement to disarm Hamas and other militant organisations in Gaza. Hamas leader Ghazi Hamad declared that "draft agreement" announced by Trump calls for the transfer of heavy weaponry in Gaza to a Palestinian administration following Israeli withdrawal from Gaza.

== Organization ==
Al-Qassam Brigades are organized into formal military structures with established command hierarchies. They organize themselves from the squad, all the way to the brigade level, similar to conventional militaries. Strategies centered on targeted killings to remove key Hamas leaders are often ineffective, as Hamas is capable of promoting low-ranking members to replace those killed.

The forces are mainly divided into five brigades, divided geographically. Each brigade is divided into multiple battalions, with 30 total battalions. Each battalion is associated with a major settlement. They may be relocated and change their areas of responsibility during conflicts.

The current brigades and battalions identified by the Institute for the Study of War are,

- North Brigade—North Gaza Governorate
  - Beit Lahia Battalion
  - Beit Hanoun Battalion
  - al Khalifa al Rashidun Battalion
  - Martyr Suhail Ziadeh Battalion
  - Jabalia al Balad (Abdul Raouf Nabhan) Battalion
  - Imad Aql (Western) Battalion
  - Elite Battalion
- Gaza Brigade—Gaza Governorate
  - Sabra-Tal al Islam Battalion
  - Daraj wal Tuffah Battalion
  - Radwan (al Furkan) Battalion
  - Shujaiya Battalion
  - Zaytoun Battalion
  - Shati Battalion
  - Possible Elite Battalion per reports by Arab media, unconfirmed by Hamas or IDF.
- Central Brigade—Central Governorate
  - Deir al Balah Battalion
  - Al Bureij Battalion
  - Al Maghazi Battalion
  - Nusairat Battalion
  - Possible Elite Battalion
- Khan Younis Brigade—Khan Younis Governorate
  - Camp (West Khan Younis) Battalion
  - North Khan Younis Battalion
  - South Khan Younis Battalion
  - Eastern (Khan Younis) Battalion
  - Qarara Battalion
  - Elite Battalion
- Rafah Brigade—Rafah Governorate
  - Eastern Battalion
  - Khalid bin al Walid (Yabna Camp) Battalion
  - Shaboura Battalion
  - Possible fourth battalion, name unknown.
  - Elite Battalion

As a result of the Israeli invasion of Gaza Hamas suffered heavy losses and multiple battalions were dismantled by the IDF. According to the ISW by September 2024 Hamas is fighting in a disorganized manner through small, de-centralized cells of fighters. ISW and American Enterprise Institute's Critical Threats Project had noted in August 2024 that these cells are capable of merging to rebuild the battalions or regenerating the destroyed battalions by recruitment when IDF withdraws from areas.

=== Recruitment ===
Hamas fighters are largely recruited from unemployed minors, aged under 18. About 50,000 Gazan youths under 18 registered for "security" training. Recruitment is likely driven by the highest unemployment in the world, where 45% of Gazans are unemployed. Al-Qassam spokesman Abu Obaida stated in a public speech in 2023 during the Gaza–Israel conflict that 85% of their recruits are orphans desiring revenge whose parents were killed by the Israeli Defense Forces.

== Strength and armament ==
Since its establishment in December 1987, the military capability of the Brigades has increased markedly, from rifles to Qassam rockets and more. Although the Brigades manufacture their own weapons, an Associated Press analysis found that the majority of their arms come from China, Iran, and Russia, as well as North Korea and former Warsaw Pact countries. The Associated Press was unable to determine whether Hamas obtains weapons directly from those nations or through arms trafficking. China and North Korea have denied directly arming the Brigades, but American, Israeli, and South Korean intelligence suggests that North Korea has, while a Hamas official has stated the group received permission from Russia to copy its weapons. Iran is believed to smuggle weapons to the Brigades via underground tunnels in Gaza.

The Brigades run their own intelligence division.

The Brigades have a substantial inventory of light automatic weapons and grenades, improvised rockets, mortars, bombs, suicide belts, and explosives. The group engages in military-style training, including training that takes place in Gaza, on a range of weapons designed to inflict significant casualties on civilian and military targets.

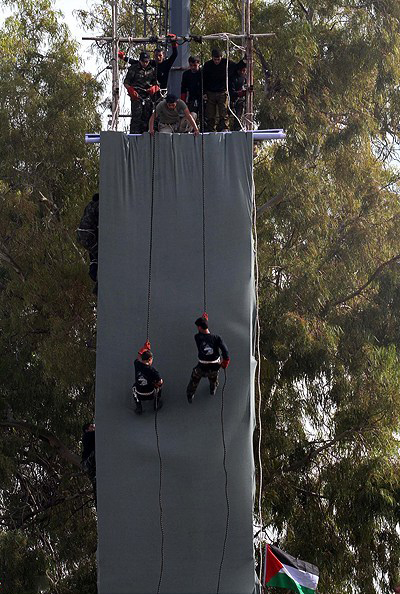
Al Qassam militants rappelling during a training exercise in Gaza, January 2013

The Brigades have a variety of anti-tank guided missiles, including the Kornet-E, Konkurs-M, Bulsae-2 (North Korean version of Fagot), 9K11 Malyutka and MILAN missiles. They possess shoulder-launched anti-aircraft missiles (MANPADS), such as the SA-7B, SA-18 Igla missiles, and it is believed a number of SA-24 Igla-S that it received from Libya.

While the number of members is known only to the Brigades leadership, in 2011, Israel estimated that the Brigades have a cadre of several hundred members who receive military-style training, including training in Iran and Syria. Additionally, the Brigades have an estimated 30,000 operatives "of varying degrees of skill and professionalism" who are members of the internal security forces, Hamas, and their supporters. These operatives can be expected to reinforce the Brigades in an "emergency situation." Other sources estimate their strength at 30,000–50,000. An October 2023 estimate provides a figure of 40,000 fighters, with expertise in cyber security, naval warfare, and other specializations.

According to a statement by CIA director George Tenet in 2000, possibly referring to the Brigades, Hamas has pursued a capability to conduct attacks with toxic chemicals. There have been reports of Hamas operatives planning and preparing attacks incorporating chemicals. In one case, nails and bolts packed into explosives detonated by a Hamas suicide bomber in a December 2001 attack in Ben-Yehuda Street in Jerusalem were soaked in rat poison. In 2014, they launched the first Palestinian reconnaissance (UAV) aircraft, called Ababeel1.

=== Gaza forces ===
During the Gaza war, the IDF published its intelligence about the Hamas military in the Gaza Strip. They put the strength of the Qassam Brigades there at the start of the war at 30,000 fighters, organised by area in five brigades, consisting in total of 24 battalions and c. 140 companies. Each regional brigade had a number of strongholds and outposts, and included specialised arrays for rocket firing, anti-tank missiles, air defenses, snipers, and engineering.

On 8 January 2024, Israel discovered the largest known weapons factory of Hamas in Bureij. The site was opened for reporters by the IDF which contained, metal tubes and components as well as shell casings were stacked in an overground workshop area and long metal racks holding missiles could be seen. An elevator lead into a tunnel where rockets were stored and is connected to a tunnel network which allowed Hamas to transport rockets underground to launch sites. The same month, Israel reported that it discovered a "massive" stockpile of Chinese weaponry used by Hamas.

== List of Al-Qassam Brigades attacks ==
Attacks during the First Intifada of 1987–1993
Date	Event	Killed	Injured	Responsibility claimed
16 April 1993	a Hamas suicide car bomb killed two in Mehola Junction bombing.			
19 October 1994	a suicide bomber detonates on a bus in Tel Aviv	22	56	Hamas
25 December 1994	a suicide bomber detonates at a bus stop in Jerusalem		12	
9 April 1995	two suicide bombers detonate in Gaza	8 (1 American + 7 IDF soldiers)	50	Hamas
21 August 1995	a suicide bomber detonates on a bus	5 (1 American + 4 IDF soldiers)	100	Hamas
9 September 1996	the abduction and murder of IDF soldier Sharon Edri.	1		
21 March 1997	a Hamas suicide bomber detonated at a Tel Aviv sidewalk café.	3 women	46	
4 September 1997	three suicide bombers detonate in Jerusalem.	4	up to 200	Hamas
27 August 1998	a bomb in a garbage bin explodes in Tel Aviv during rush hour		14	Hamas
19 October 1998	two grenades thrown into a crowd at the Be'er Sheva bus station during rush hour.		59	Hamas
29 October 1998	a Hamas suicide car bomber attempts to ram a school bus head-on near the Gush Katif Junction. An IDF jeep escorting the bus blocked the bomber who detonated the vehicle, killing the driver of the jeep and injuring 2 others. Six people in the bus received light injuries.	1	8	

Attacks during the Second Intifada (September 2000 – 2005)
Date	Event	Killed	Injured	Responsibility claimed
1 January 2001	a Hamas suicide car bomber detonates in the city of Netanya. One victim died 7 days later.	1	59	
14 February 2001	a Hamas suicide bomber plowed a bus into a crowd and detonated.	8	21	
4 March 2001	a Hamas suicide bomber detonates in the city of Netanya.	3	68	
28 March 2001	a Hamas suicide bomber blew himself up amidst a group of students waiting at a bus stop in Qalqilya in the West Bank.	2	4	
22 April 2001	a Hamas suicide bomber blew himself up Kfar Saba.	1	50	
18 May 2001	a Hamas suicide bomber blew himself up at the entrance of a shopping mall in the city of Netanya.	5	100+	
1 June 2001	Dolphinarium massacre — a suicide bomber linked to Hamas denotes outside a Tel Aviv nightclub.	21 (16 teens)	76	
9 August 2001	Sbarro restaurant suicide bombing — a suicide bomber detonates in Jerusalem.	15	130	Hamas
4 September 2001	a Hamas suicide bomber detonates in West Jerusalem.		15	
26 November 2001	a suicide bomber detonates at the Erez Crossing.		2	Hamas
1 December 2001	two suicide bombers detonated one after the other followed by a car bomb in a mall in West Jerusalem.	11	130+	Hamas
2 December 2001	a suicide bomber boarded an Israeli bus traveling from the Nave Sha'anan district in Haifa; paying the driver with a large bill, he then blew himself.	15	40	Hamas
9 March 2002	a suicide bomber explodes in the crowded Moment café in the center of Jerusalem.	11	54 (10 serious)	Hamas
31 March 2002	Matza restaurant massacre — a suicide bomber detonates in an Arab restaurant in Haifa.	15	40+	Hamas
10 April 2002	a suicide bombing on a bus near Kibbutz Yagur, east of Haifa.	8 (6 IDF soldiers + 2 civilians)	22	Hamas
7 May 2002	a suicide bombing in a crowded pool hall in Rishon Lezion, southeast of Tel-Aviv.	16	55	Hamas
19 May 2002	a suicide bomber disguised as a soldier, blew himself up in the market in Netanya.	3	59	Hamas and the PFLP
18 June 2002	Patt junction massacre — a suicide bomber detonates on a bus in Jerusalem.	19	74+	Hamas
16 July 2002	a terrorist attack on a bus traveling from Bnei Brak to Emmanuel, wherein an explosive charge was detonated next to the bullet-resistant bus. The terrorists waited in ambush, reportedly wearing Israeli army uniforms, and opened fire on the bus.	9	20	Hamas, Al Aqsa Martyrs' Brigades, and the DFLP
31 July 2002	a cell-phone detonated bomb exploded in the Frank Sinatra student center cafeteria on the Hebrew University's Mt. Scopus campus.	9 (5 Americans)	85	Hamas (expressed regret for the American deaths)
4 August 2002	a suicide bombing of an Egged bus takes place at the Meron junction in the Galilee.	9	~50	Hamas
27 February 2008	during February 2008, 257 rockets and 228 mortars were fired from the Gaza Strip into the western Negev causing 5 injuries, and on 27 February, the death of a 47-year-old student at Sapir College. Hamas has previously claimed responsibility for rocket barrages.	1		Hamas
7 October 2023	In a cross-border land incursion dubbed Operation Al-Aqsa Flood, some 3,000 militants infiltrated Israel using trucks, motorcycles, bulldozers, speedboats, and powered paragliders; attacked multiple population centers and military targets in the Gaza periphery, including Sderot, Re'im, Zikim, Be'eri, Holit, Kfar Aza, Netiv HaAsara, Nir Oz, Alumim, and Nahal Oz; killed at least 1,400 people; and took over 200 people hostage. Further information: October 7 attacks, Battle of Re'im, Battle of Sderot, Battle of Zikim, Re'im music festival massacre, Be'eri massacre, Holit massacre, Kfar Aza massacre, Netiv HaAsara massacre, Nir Oz massacre, Alumim massacre, and Nahal Oz massacre	1,200+		Hamas, Palestinian Islamic Jihad, Popular Front for the Liberation of Palestine (PFLP), Democratic Front for the Liberation of Palestine (DFLP), Lions' Den, Al Aqsa Martyrs' Brigades

== Killed leaders ==
On 3 September 2005, after Israel's withdrawal from settlements in the Gaza Strip, Al-Qassam Brigades revealed for the first time the names and functions of its commanders on its website as well as in a printed bulletin distributed to Palestinians. On 12 July 2006, the Israeli Air Force bombed a house in the Sheikh Radwan neighborhood of Gaza City, where Mohammed Deif, Ahmad al-Ghandur, and Raid Said were meeting. The three-story house was completely leveled, killing Hamas official Nabil al-Salmiah, his wife, their five children and two other children. Two of the three brigades leaders present escaped with moderate wounds. Deif received a spinal injury that required four hours of surgery.

On 1 January 2009, Nizar Rayan, a top Hamas leader who served as a liaison between the Palestinian organization's political leadership and its military wing, was killed in an Israeli Air Force strike during Operation Cast Lead. The day before the attack, Rayan had advocated renewal of suicide attacks on Israel, declaring, "Our only language with the Jew is through the gun". A 2,000-pound bomb was dropped on his house, also killing his 4 wives (Hiam 'Abdul Rahman Rayan, 46; Iman Khalil Rayan, 46; Nawal Isma'il Rayan, 40; and Sherine Sa'id Rayan, 25) and 11 of their children (As'ad, 2; Usama Ibn Zaid, 3; 'Aisha, 3; Reem, 4; Miriam, 5; Halima, 5; 'Abdul Rahman, 6; Abdul Qader, 12; Aaya, 12; Zainab, 15; and Ghassan, 16). On 3 January 2009, Israeli aircraft attacked the car in which Abu Zakaria al-Jamal, a leader of Izz ad-Din al-Qassam armed wing, was traveling. He died of the wounds suffered in the bombing. The following day, the Israeli Air Force struck and killed in Khan Yunis two senior Brigrade leaders, Hussam Hamdan and Muhammad Hilo, both of whom the Israelis blamed for attacks against Israel. According to Israeli authorities Hamdan was in charge of rocket attacks against Beersheba and Ofakim, while Hilo was reportedly behind Hamas' special forces in Khan Yunis. On 15 January 2009, the Israeli Air Force bombed a house in Jabaliya, killing a prominent Brigades commander named Mohammed Watfa. The strike targeted the Palestinian Interior Minister Said Seyam, who was also killed.

On 30 July 2010, one of the leaders Issa Abdul-Hadi Al-Batran, aged 40, was killed at the Nuseirat refugee camp in the central Gaza Strip by an Israeli airstrike. On 14 November 2012, Ahmed Jaabari, the head of Al-Qassam Brigade, was killed along with seven others in Gaza, marking the beginning of Israel's "Operation Pillar of Defense". On 21 August 2014, an Israeli air strike killed Muhammad Abu Shamala, the sub-commander of Southern Gaza Strip; Raed al Atar, the commander of the Rafah company and member of the Hamas high military council; and Mohammed Barhoum. On 30 January 2018, Imad Al-Alami died as a result of injuries sustained while he was inspecting his personal weapon in Gaza City.

Hamas confirmed in November 2023 that Israeli airstrikes had killed Ahmed Ghandour, the commander of Al-Qassam Brigade in northern Gaza; Ayman Siam, head of the rocket-firing unit; and Fursan Khalifa, a senior commander in the West Bank, as well as Ghandour's deputy Wael Rajab. Marwan Issa, deputy leader of Al-Qassam Brigades and second-in-command to Mohammed Deif, was killed by Israeli forces on 10 March 2024.

On 13 May 2025, the IDF and Shin Bet said that Mohammed Sinwar, commander of the Izz al-Din al-Qassam Brigades, had been targeted in an Israeli airstrike on a bunker under the Gaza European Hospital in Khan Yunis. The strike killed 26 people, according to the Gaza Health Ministry, but Sinwar's fate was unclear. According to the Saudi channel Al-Hadath, the bodies of Sinwar and Muhammad Shabana were recovered from the tunnel. Israeli defense minister Israel Katz said that "according to all the indications Muhammad Sinwar was eliminated." Senior Hamas official Osama Hamdan said that Hamas members in the Gaza Strip had told him that Sinwar was still alive. On 28 May 2025, Israeli Prime Minister Benjamin Netanyahu said that Sinwar had been killed. On 31 May 2025, the IDF and Shin Bet confirmed that Sinwar had been killed. On 8 June 2025, the IDF said they found Sinwar's body in an "underground passageway beneath the European Hospital" in Khan Yunis.

On 15 May 2026, Izz al-Din al-Haddad, successor of Mohammed Sinwar as the leader and commander of the Al-Qassam Brigades, was killed in an Israeli air strike in Gaza City. On 26 May, his successor, Mohammed Odeh, was killed just days after his predecessor's death in a similar attack.

== International response ==
The international community, and more specifically the United Nations, considers the practice of war combatants to turn civilians into human shields as a violation of the Geneva Conventions standards of war, and considers indiscriminate attacks (e.g., by rockets or suicide bombers) on civilian populations as illegal under international law.

Al-Qassam Brigades are explicitly listed as a terrorist organization by the European Union, Australia, New Zealand, Egypt, Japan, and the United Kingdom. Though not explicitly mentioning EQB, Argentina, Canada, the United States, and Paraguay have designated its parent entity, Hamas, as a terrorist organization; Brigade leader Mohammed Deif has also been classified as a Specially Designated Global Terrorist by the US under Executive Order 13224.

== Military media ==
An inverted red triangle has been used as a "signature" by the Qassam Brigades to highlight combat vehicles and ground forces that are about to be targeted

After Israel launched the ground invasion of Gaza on 27 October 2023, the Qassam Brigades publicized many of their ambushes against Israeli vehicles on their military media for the battle of al-Aqsa Flood. Most of these videos, shot mainly from the fighters' point of view through a GoPro camera involve the ambush of vehicles, targeted by rockets before the militiamen retreat to their bases, though footage of sniper operations and targeting ground forces has been published as well.

Targets were highlighted with a flashing inverted red triangle. Due to the nature of these attacks, being hit and run and militiamen turning away immediately after the round has been shot, as well as the Israeli vehicles Trophy APS, it has been called into question how effective these attacks were and how many tanks were successful hit instead of the rockets being intercepted. In spite of this, the Qassam brigades have publicised videos on their military media showing successful hits where plates are seen being torn off tanks after being hit by rockets, or the aftermath of their ambushes showing ignited vehicles, as well as captured uniforms and weapons from the IDF. videos in July 2024 also show the Qassam Brigades destroying and igniting a Namer and a Merkava, which were both equipped with a trophy APS.

== See also ==
- Nukhba forces
