= Badr-3 =

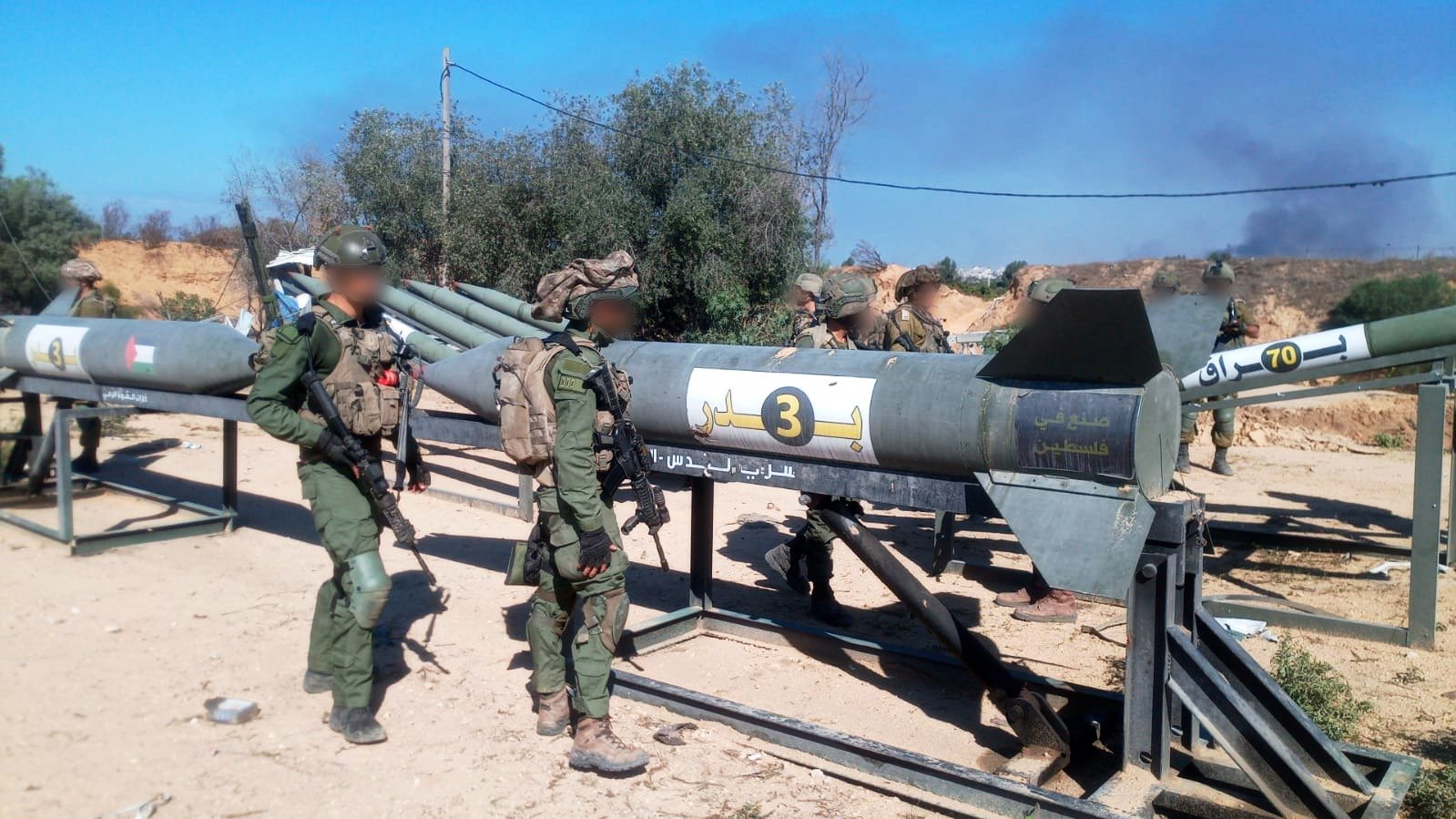
- A Badr-3 captured by the Bislamach Brigade and the Yahalom (IDF) unit at a PIJ Outpost in northern Gaza (17 November 2023)
- Type: Surface-to-surface missile
- Place of origin: Iran

Service history
- Used by: Palestinian Islamic Jihad
- Wars: Gaza–Israel conflict, Gaza war

Production history
- Designer: Technical Directorate for Military Production, a branch of the Popular Mobilization Forces, al-Quds Force Unit 340

Specifications
- Effective firing range: 13 km
- Warhead weight: 250-400 kg

The Badr-3 (Arabic: بدر 3 (صاروخ)), Hebrew: בדר 3) is a surface-to-surface rocket. Developed in 2019 in Iran under the Popular Mobilization Forces's Technical Directorate for Military Production and the Quds Force, its design was primarily produced and exported as part of the Palestinian rocket arsenal, of which its primary user is the Al-Quds Brigades under Palestinian Islamic Jihad (PIJ).

== Characteristics ==
Compared to other rockets by Hamas, PIJ, and Palestinian factions in the Gaza–Israel conflict, the Badr-3 has a heavier payload than most other rockets, with a verified range of 8 miles (13 km), despite claims by PIJ to be able to travel 160 km, compared to the likes of the Fajr-5, the R-160, and Hamas' Ayyash 250 (250 km range).

With a warhead weighing 250 kg, in October 2023, a spokesperson for al-Quds Brigade claimed variants with a 400 kg warhead. Though its early development was primarily in Iran, it was designed to be able to be produced locally.

== Usage ==
Early stages of its development was placed around 2016–2018, as intelligence reports indicated that Iran was developing and producing ballistic missiles for proxies amongst its allies with focus on distribution to Iraqi militias and allies throughout the Middle East, including Houthi rebels, Hezbollah, and PIJ.

Early stages of the missile's development was helmed by IRGC's Quds Force Unit 340 with motor testing in Bid Kaneh and test flights at Semnan, Iran.

The PIJ unveiled the missile in 2019, with its first usage launched from Gaza to the city of Ashkelon.

The missile saw sporadic usage in Palestinian rocket attacks on Israel from 2019 to 2023, to which on 12 May 2023, the missile was intercepted during the debut operation of David's Sling.

The missile saw extensive usage on part of the PIJ during the Gaza war. On 17 November 2023, during the Israeli invasion of the Gaza Strip, the Bislamach Brigade and Yahalom units of the Israel Defense Forces captured a set of missiles in northern Gaza. They were then sent to Israel for further analysis.
