= Wa'el Nassar =

Member of Hamas (1973–2004)

Wa'el Nassar (1973–2004; Arabic: وائل نصار) was an active member and one of the senior leaders of the Izz ad-Din al-Qassam Brigades, the military wing of Palestinian Islamist movement Hamas, until his assassination by Israel Defense Forces (IDF) on 30 May 2004 in Gaza City.

== History ==
A devout Muslim, Nassar joined the Izz ad-Din al-Qassam Brigades in 1992, not long after the organization's founding. Early on he became personal bodyguard of Ahmed Yassin, one of the founders of Hamas and one of its spiritual leaders. He quickly took charge of a small group of militants and led several attacks against the IDF in the Gaza Strip, which claimed the lives of at least two soldiers.

Identified as a top leader of the brigades by 1995, Nassar prepared to carry out a suicide bombing, but failed to infiltrate Israel and his plan was foiled. Placed on the list of people to kill or arrest by the IDF, Nassar was chased by the Palestinian Authority (PA), which was at that time engaged in a peace process with Israel, and arrested in 1996 by the PA. He was then placed in administrative detention and was released at the beginning of the Al-Aqsa Intifada. Living clandestinely in Gaza, Wa'el Nassar then recovered as a top leader of Hamas' brigades and led many cells of terrorists which carried out several sophisticated and lethal attacks against Israeli settlers and soldiers in Gaza. From 2000 to his death, Nassar directed operations that claimed, according to Hamas and IDF sources, the lives of at least 27 Israeli soldiers or civilians.

Injured in 2001, when the mortar crew he led was hit by an Israeli missile fired from a helicopter, he recovered and masterminded several important terrorist operations. Among others, Nassar planned the suicide bombing carried out by Reem El-Reyashi on 14 January 2004, the first ever Hamas' female suicide bomber, which killed four Israeli soldiers at the Erez checkpoint north of the Gaza Strip. He was also blamed for the 21 March 2004, bombing of Ashdod, in southern Israel, which claimed the lives of 10 civilians and triggered an IDF reprisal which killed Hamas' spiritual leader and founder, sheik Ahmed Yasin.

Actively searched for by Israel, Nassar, living in hiding, continued to lead groups of Hamas fighters and was reportedly in charge of the cell that detonated a powerful bomb under an Israeli armoured personnel carrier (APC) in Gaza City's Zeitun neighborhood, which killed 6 IDF soldiers during an Israeli incursion on 12 May 2004. Nassar's cell then collected body parts of the killed soldiers and exchanged them to Israel following their display in video. Vowing to avenge the soldier's deaths, Israel marked Nassar for death and actively searched for his whereabouts. On 30 May 2004, Wa'el Nassar was riding a motorcycle in Zeitun following an operation against an Israeli settlement when an IDF drone fired a missile at the vehicle, killing him and his assistant Mohammed Sarsour, as well as a bystander.
