= Imad Abbas =

Hamas engineer and bomb maker (1975–2004)

- Born: 1975
- Died: 21 October 2004 (aged 28–29)
- Engineering career
- Employer: Hamas

Imad Abbas (Arabic: عماد عباس) was an engineer and bomb maker for Izz ad-Din al-Qassam Brigades, the military wing of Palestinian Islamist movement Hamas. He was killed by an Israeli Apache helicopter on 21 October 2004, in Gaza City.

Abbas joined the ranks of Hamas in 1991, when he was 17 years old. That year, he participated in an attack killing Israeli soldiers near the Karni crossing on the Gaza Strip border, and so joined Israel's list of wanted members of Hamas. As a fugitive, he worked with other Hamas agents such Imad Aqel, before successfully escaping to Egypt in a boat. Abbas was arrested by the Egyptian authorities but soon released, and he spent the next four years travelling in various Arab countries. In 1996, he came back in the Gaza Strip where he joined other militants. At the beginning of the Al-Aqsa Intifada, Abbas became the assistant of Adnan al-Ghoul, Hamas' top bomb maker at the time.

Living in hiding and never appearing in public, Abbas was killed along with al-Ghoul on 21 October 2004, when an Israeli Apache helicopter fired missiles at the car in which they were travelling.

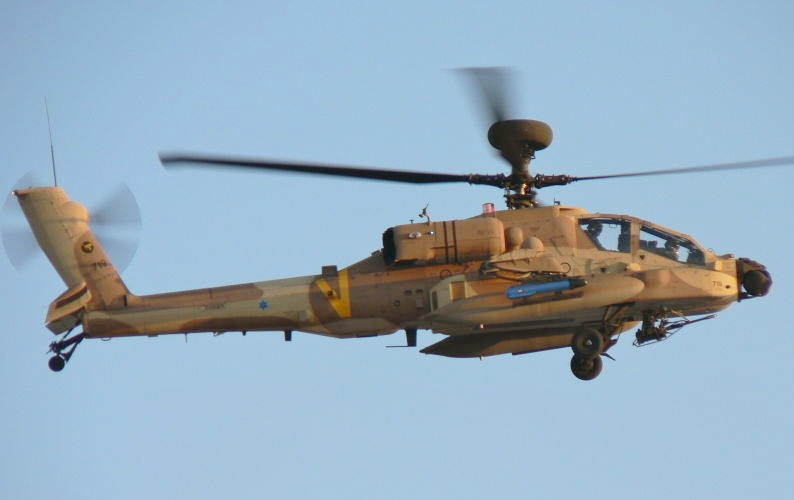
Israeli Air Force AH-64D Saraph
