= Sinai option =

Proposal to end Israeli–Palestinian conflict

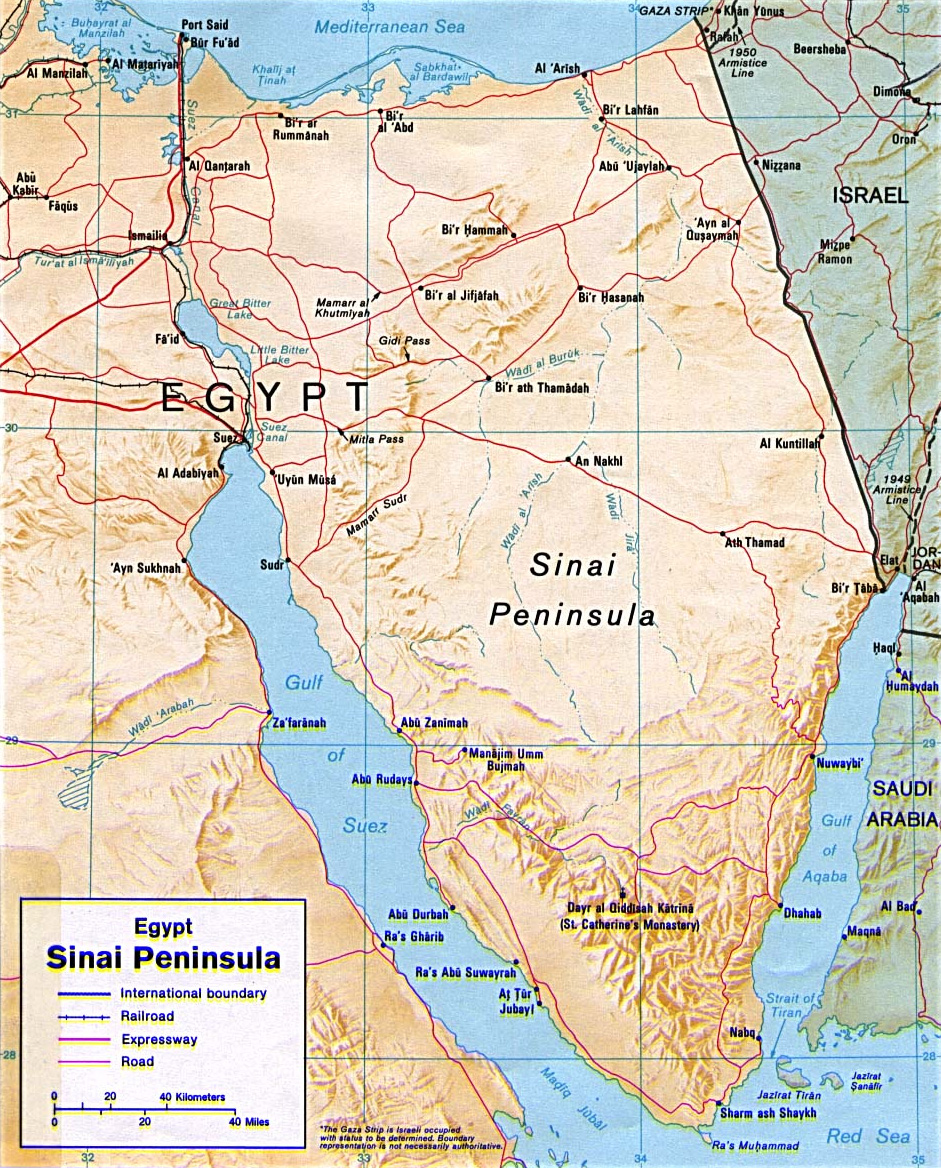
Map of Sinai Peninsula

To resolve conflicts and establish permanent peace, there is a plan by the Israeli government to transfer the Gaza Strip's 2.3 million people to Egypt’s Sinai Peninsula and turn the peninsula into an alternative for Palestine. There is also a plan by Israeli Government to offer a monetary package to Palestinians living in West Bank and encourage them to migrate to the Sinai Peninsula.

However, Prime Minister Benjamin Netanyahu’s office played down the report compiled by the Intelligence Ministry as a hypothetical exercise. But its conclusions deepened long-standing Egyptian fears that Israel wants to make Gaza into Egypt’s problem and revived for Palestinians memories of their greatest trauma: "The uprooting of hundreds of thousands of people who fled or were forced from their homes during the fighting surrounding Israel’s creation". Egypt rejects Palestinian refugees into Sinai and warned Israel of a rupture if any of those tried to enter into their land.

The control of Sinai Peninsula was taken over by Israel during the Six Day War in 1967 and later returned it to Egypt after the peace treaty in 1979 respectively.

== History ==
In 2014, Israeli Prime Minister Benjamin Netanyahu reportedly put forward an alternative vision for the two-state solution, suggesting that Israel would annex its West Bank settlements while Palestinians would be compensated with land from Egypt's Sinai Peninsula. This proposal, first reported by the Israeli daily Haaretz, was brought to then U.S. President Barack Obama and Secretary of State John Kerry on multiple occasions. Netanyahu argued that Egyptian President Abdel Fattah el-Sisi could be convinced to accept the plan, which would establish a Palestinian state partly in the West Bank and partly in Sinai, rather than within Israel’s pre-1967 borders. The Sinai Peninsula, covering approximately 60,000 sq. km, is a vast and sparsely populated region, home to only about 600,000 people. Its large tracts of uninhabited land, Netanyahu suggested, could serve as a viable area for 5.4 million Palestinian resettlement. He assured that the Israeli government would assist in rehabilitating and resettling Palestinians from both Gaza and the West Bank in every possible way. However, the proposal faced immediate opposition. According to reports, Egypt directly informed the Obama administration that it would not accept the plan. U.S. officials also concluded that the Palestinians were unlikely to agree to such a compromise. Additionally, Egyptian state newspaper Al-Ahram quoted President el-Sisi as firmly rejecting any notion of a Palestinian state in Sinai, citing national security concerns and the strategic economic significance of the region. Netanyahu's office later dismissed the claims as inaccurate, but the proposal highlighted ongoing attempts to redefine the boundaries of a future Palestinian state beyond the traditional framework of negotiations. The rejection of the plan reinforced the broader geopolitical challenges surrounding the Israeli–Palestinian conflict, particularly the difficulty of finding a resolution acceptable to all parties involved.

== Egyptian position ==
According to El-Sisi, President of Egypt, Israel should move affected Palestinians to Negev (highlighted in the map) due to Gaza War

On October 18, 2023, Egyptian President Abdel Fattah el-Sisi stated that if Israel sought to relocate Palestinians affected by the Gaza conflict, it could move them to the Negev Desert in southern Israel rather than pressuring Egypt to host them. His remarks came as Egypt resisted growing international calls to open its borders for Palestinian refugees fleeing Israeli airstrikes and a potential ground invasion. El-Sisi warned that allowing large-scale Palestinian displacement into Sinai could turn the region into a base for military operations against Israel, which, in turn, could lead to Egypt being perceived as harboring militant activities. He emphasized that Egypt would not permit such a scenario, recalling the historical precedent of 1948 when, following Israel’s establishment, tens of thousands of Palestinian refugees fled into Egypt, transforming the town of Rafah into a refugee settlement. Egypt's refusal to accommodate displaced Palestinians underscored its concerns over national security and the long-term implications of mass resettlement in the Sinai Peninsula.

== Current status ==
In early 2025, during his second term, U.S. President Donald Trump proposed relocating Palestinians from Gaza to neighboring countries, including Egypt. The proposal suggested that Egypt could temporarily or permanently accommodate Gazans displaced by ongoing conflicts, particularly in the Sinai Peninsula. However, the Egyptian government strongly opposed the plan, citing concerns over national security, regional stability, and the broader implications for the Israeli–Palestinian conflict. Egyptian officials argued that the forced displacement of Palestinians into Sinai would not only undermine the Palestinian cause but also create long-term security risks. President Abdel Fattah el-Sisi emphasized that such a move could turn Sinai into a base for conflict, potentially destabilizing Egypt's border regions. The government also reiterated its historical stance against resettling Palestinians outside their homeland, insisting that a resolution to the Israeli–Palestinian issue should not come at the expense of Egypt’s sovereignty or territorial integrity. The proposal was widely rejected by Egypt and other Arab nations, with concerns that it could set a precedent for permanently displacing Palestinians rather than pursuing a sustainable political solution. The rejection underscored the complexities of regional geopolitics and the sensitivity surrounding any efforts to alter the demographics of the Palestinian territories through external resettlement.

== See also ==
- Jordanian option
- Israstin
- Israeli–Palestinian conflict
- List of wars involving Israel
- One-state solution
- Two-state solution
- Three-state solution
- Egypt–Israel relations
