= Al Quds 3 =

Palestinian homemade artillery rocket

Al Quds-3 is an artillery rocket based on the Russian Grad and Katyusha weapons. The new rocket, test-fired against Ashkelon on March 28, 2006, weighs 66 kilograms and carries 17 kilograms of explosives. It was developed in the Gaza Strip, allegedly with the aid of the Palestinian Authority funding and Iranian operatives. In April 2006, DebkaFile reported Palestinian militants were manufacturing the Quds-3 along with a multiple-rocket launcher system.

The 122 mm launcher fires 10 rockets simultaneously to a distance of 18–30 kilometers. The system, capable of firing 40 rockets within 20 seconds, weighs 13 tons and enables Palestinians in the Gaza Strip to strike Ashkelon, Ashdod, Netivot and Ofakim. The rockets are launched by a crew that pulls back approximately 60 meters from the launcher and releases the rockets by pulling a wire.

In May, Palestinian Islamic Jihad fired a Grad-class Katyusha rocket at the western Negev community of Netiv Ha'asara. According to Middle East Newsline, Islamic Jihad has test-fired at least three indigenous versions of the Russian-origin BM-21 Grad rocket (from the northern Gaza Strip) for range and accuracy. "We believe Islamic Jihad, probably with Hamas, has been developing and producing prototypes of the Grad... We know they have the expertise and the equipment to produce the rocket."

In July 2006, media reports indicated Hamas had successfully developed an indigenous variant of the Soviet-origin Katyusha rocket (BM-21 Grad) with a range of 24 kilometers. The new 122 mm Grad was fired on July 18 at Kibbutz Sdot Bror Hayil—approximately 19 kilometers from the Gaza Strip. The rocket traveled 24 kilometers, exceeding the 20 km range of a standard 122 mm Katyusha.

== See also ==
- Palestinian domestic weapons production
