= Egypt–Palestine relations =

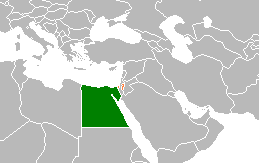

- Egypt: Palestine

Egypt–Palestine relations are the bilateral relations between the Arab Republic of Egypt and the State of Palestine. Egyptian President Gamal Abdel Nasser was a strong supporter of the Palestinian cause and he favored self-determination for the Palestinians. Although the Egyptian government has maintained a good relationship with Israel since the Camp David Accords, most Egyptians strongly resent Israel, and disapprove of the close relationship between the Israeli and Egyptian governments.

== History ==
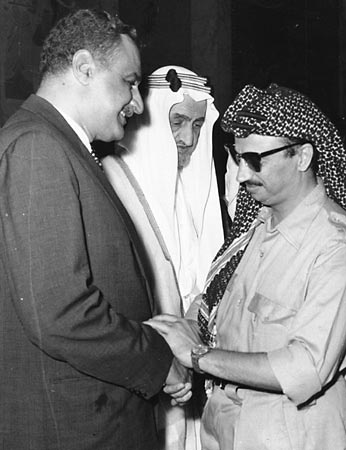
Nasser with Arafat (right) at the 1970 emergency Arab League summit, the day before the former died of a heart attack

=== Pre-20th century ===
The Hyksos, an ancient Levantine group, invaded Ancient Egypt and established their own dynasty in Egypt. Egypt would later expel the Hyksos and rule over Palestine during the New Kingdom of Ancient Egypt. Egypt and Palestine would then be ruled by foreign kingdoms until Muhammad Ali Pasha's war against the Ottoman Empire. After the war, Egypt would rule over the Levant, including Palestine, but high taxes and conscription would lead to a revolt against Egyptian rule. Egypt would later retreat from the Levant following the second Egyptian-Ottoman war and enter the British sphere of influence, while the Ottomans retained control over Palestine.

=== Early 20th-century conflicts ===
During World War One, Egypt sided with British and fought the Ottoman Empire in Sinai and Palestine. During the war, the Balfour Declaration declared British support for Zionism, a political movement for establishing a Jewish state in Palestine. Zionism would come in to conflict with Palestinian nationalism, beginning the Israeli-Palestinian conflict. Egypt under the Muhammad Ali dynasty was supportive of the Palestinians in the conflict. The Palestinian Revolt in 1936 was supported by the Egyptian Islamist political party, the Muslim Brotherhood, with Muslim Brotherhood members aiding the Palestinian Fedayeen. Egypt would also join the Arab League invasion of Israel in 1948, capturing Gaza. While the West Bank was annexed by Jordan, Egypt instead created the All-Palestine Protectorate in Gaza, which claimed authority over all of Palestine and was ruled by the All-Palestine Government. Egyptian authorities would keep close political control over Gaza.

=== Relations under Nasser and Sadat ===
After the Egyptian Revolution of 1952, many Palestinians saw Nasser as the only real person who could defeat the Israelis and many of them had sympathized with him and supported him. Egypt would continue to support the Palestinians, and during the Suez Crisis, Israel invaded Gaza and the Sinai. Israel's invasion would lead to the Khan Yunis massacre, where the Israeli Defense Forces shot two hundred Palestinians in Khan Yunis and Rafah, both located in Gaza. In 1959, the Gaza Strip was officially merged into the short lived United Arab Republic, a political union between Egypt and Syria. In 1962 the UAR government established a Palestinian Legislative Council to govern Gaza. During the January 1964 Arab League summit in Cairo, the Palestine Liberation Organization or PLO was established. It included various Palestinian factions and its first leader was Ahmad Shukeiri, who was supported by Nasser. When the Palestine Liberation Organization (PLO) was founded in 1964, Nasser proclaimed that it would hold authority over Gaza, but that power was never granted in practice. A year later, conscription was instituted for the Palestinian Liberation Army.

But after Egypt was defeated in the Six-Day War in June 1967, Nasser began to call for peace with Israel. But his traditional allies (Syria, Iraq, Algeria, and the PLO) opposed his recent moves and formed a "Rejectionist Front."

In January 1968, Nasser commenced the War of Attrition against Israel, ordering his forces to begin attacking Israeli positions east of the now-blockaded Suez Canal. In the same month, he allowed the Soviets to construct naval facilities in Port Said, Mersa Matruh, and Alexandria. Then in March, the Palestinian political party Fatah under the leadership of Yasser Arafat, faced off with Israel in Jordan in what became known as the Battle of Karameh. The Jordanian Army eventually backed Fatah fighters, forcing Israel to withdraw its troops without achieving its strategic goal—destruction of the Palestinian fedayeen base. The battle was thus seen as an Arab victory over Israel and Nasser immediately dispatched Mohammed Hassanein Heikal to invite Arafat to Cairo. There, Nasser offered the Fatah movement arms and financial support, but advised Arafat to think of peace with Israel and establishing a Palestinian state comprising the West Bank and the Gaza Strip; Nasser was effectively ceding his leadership of the "Palestine issue" to Arafat. Eventually Yasser Arafat was later elected President of the PLO. Nasser helped negotiate the Cairo agreement between the PLO and Lebanese government in 1969.

Hours before dying, Nasser brokered a peace deal between the PLO and Jordan after Black September at the 1970 Arab League summit, which was held in Cairo, but after his death, his successor Anwar Sadat signed the Camp David Accords. This angered the Arab World and it led to the expulsion of Egypt from the Arab League until 1989. Arafat criticized the peace treaty, saying "Let them sign what they like. False peace will not last.".

=== Mubarak era (1981–2011) ===
After Sadat's assassination, Hosni Mubarak became president of Egypt. He pursued and began a policy of reconciliation with the Arab states while balancing Egypt's relationship with the US and Israel. Arafat met Mubarak in Cairo in 1983. Egypt was one of the first countries to support the Palestinian Declaration of Independence and officially recognized Palestine on 15 November 1988.

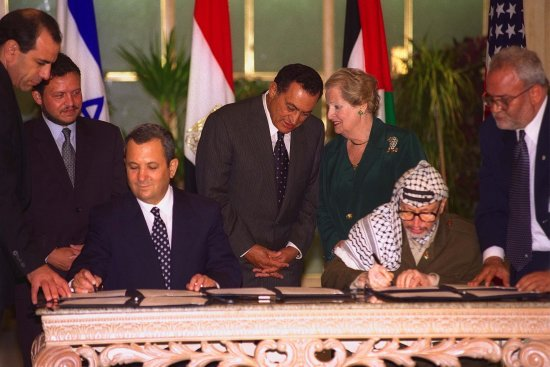
From left to right, Madeleine Albright, Hosni Mubarak, Ehud Barak, Yasser Arafat, and Abdullah II of Jordan in Sharm-El-Sheikh, Egypt for the signing ceremony.

Mubarak would have a large involvement in the Israeli-Palestinian peace process. In 1993, Mubarak hosted the Cairo Summit with both Israeli Prime Minister Yitzhak Rabin and Arafat. The next year, Egypt hosted the Gaza-Jericho agreement. In 2001, Egypt hosted the Taba Summit, which was one of the closest moments when peace could be achieved. In 2005, Egypt hosted the Sharm El Sheikh Summit, a meeting between Israeli Prime Minister Ariel Sharon, President of the Palestinian Authority Mahmoud Abbas, Egyptian President Hosni Mubarak, and King Abdullah II of Jordan to mark the end of the Second Intifada.

On 19 June 2008, the Egypt-brokered "lull" or pause in hostilities between Israel and Hamas went into effect. The term "lull" is a translation of the Arabic term Tahdiya. The agreement required Hamas to end rocket attacks on Israel and to enforce the lull throughout Gaza. In exchange, Hamas expected the blockade to end, commerce in Gaza to resume, and truck shipments to be restored to 2005 levels, which was between 500 and 600 trucks per day. Israel eased restrictions on the blockade to a reduction in rocket fire and gradually re-opened supply lines and permitted around 90 daily truck shipments to enter Gaza, up from around 70 per day. Hamas criticized Israel for its continued blockade while Israel accused Hamas of continued weapons smuggling via tunnels to Egypt and pointed to continued rocket attacks.

During the 2008-2009 Gaza War, Egypt condemned the Israeli attacks, but Egypt's foreign minister, Ahmed Aboul Gheit, said that Egypt has long warned Hamas that this would be Israel's response should Qassam fire continue. As a result of many protests, Egypt opened up the Rafah Border Crossing to allow the wounded into Egyptian hospitals. The Egyptian Ministry of Health sent 30 buses to North Sinai to help transport injured Palestinians. The Egyptian Minister of Foreign Affairs said that Hamas does not allow the wounded Gazans to cross the borders to Egypt. Egypt also deployed 500 CSF anti-riot police along the border. At the 6060th UN Security Council meeting the Egyptian representative stated that the "crippling blockade imposed by Israel" is in "flagrant violation" of Israel's responsibilities under international law, international humanitarian law and its specific obligations as an "occupying power".

After the 2010 Gaza flotilla raid, Egyptian President Hosni Mubarak denounced Israel's use of "excessive and unjustified force" while the Foreign Ministry summoned the Israeli ambassador to express its condemnation. The Egyptian President also ordered the opening of the Egyptian border to Gaza on Tuesday to allow humanitarian and medical aid into the Gaza Strip. On 13 February 2011, Egyptian opposition leader Ayman Nour stated that "the Camp David Era was over" and he did not recognize Egypt's Peace Treaty with Israel.

=== Post-Mubarak governments ===
As of 23 July 2012, Egypt allowed Palestinians to freely enter without visas. During the November 2012 Operation Pillar of Defense, Egypt harshly criticized Israel's military operation. The Egyptian ambassador was recalled to Cairo and Israel's ambassador received an official protest. Egyptian President Mohamed Morsi stated that "The Israelis must realize that this aggression is unacceptable and would only lead to instability in the region". Demanding that the Arab League call an urgent meeting of Arab foreign ministers to discuss "criminal Israeli aggression" on Gaza, and sought an immediate meeting of the UN Security Council.

The Foreign Ministry of Egypt berated the operation and called on Israel to halt its attacks. According to The Guardian, the chairman of the Freedom and Justice Party, Saad El-Katatni, said: "The Egyptian people revolted against injustice and will not accept an attack on Gaza. The brutal aggression on Gaza proves that Israel has not yet learned that Egypt has changed".

An Egyptian official reported that Egyptian hospitals are ready to receive wounded Palestinians and that the Rafah Crossing will remain open. Egyptian Prime Minister Hesham Qandil visited Gaza on Friday, 16 November.

On 17 November, the Arab Medical Union has sent a delegation of Egyptian doctors with aid across the Rafah border. On 19 November, a group of Egyptian civilians headed to Gaza to aid their Palestinian neighbors in their current tribulation.

On 29 November 2012 Egypt followed through with its continuing criticism of Israel by voting to welcome Palestine as the newest member of the United Nations by voting in favor of United Nations General Assembly resolution 67/19. That resolution made Palestine a non-member observer state just like the Vatican.

During the 2014 Israel–Gaza conflict, the Egyptian Foreign Ministry published through its Facebook page a statement where it expressed its "deep concern" about the latest situation in the Gaza Strip and called for self-restraint as well as stopping the mutual violence. A Hamas official stated that Egypt is attempting to mediate a truce between both sides and that Egyptian officials have contacted Hamas for that purpose. Egyptian FM Sameh Shoukry made a remarks following a meeting with his Jordanian counterpart where he said it is important to address the crisis in a manner that protects the Palestinians and their interests.

On 11 July, the Foreign Ministry then criticized the IDF operation in Gaza as "oppressive policies of mass punishment. Egypt rejects the irresponsible Israeli escalation in the occupied Palestinian territory, which comes in the form of excessive and unnecessary use of military force leading to the death of innocent civilians." It also demanded Israel adopt self-restraint and to keep in mind that being an "occupation force", it has a legal and moral duty to protect civilian lives. The Egyptian government urged world powers to intervene and stop the crisis when it stated that its ceasefire efforts have been met with "obstinacy and stubbornness". The same day, Egypt informed authorities in Gaza that it closed the Rafah Border Crossing after re-opening it the previous day to receive injured Palestinians for medical treatment in Egyptian hospitals. This comes after Egyptian forces seized 20 Grad rockets being smuggled from Gaza to Sinai after clashing with militants in Rafah, Egypt. However, shortly after the closure, President Abdel Fattah el-Sisi ordered the Egyptian military to transport 500 tons of aid, which comprises food and medical supplies, to Palestinians in the Gaza Strip. A statement was also released by the military saying that Egypt is pursuing its efforts to "stop the Israeli aggression on the Gaza Strip" under the president's supervision.

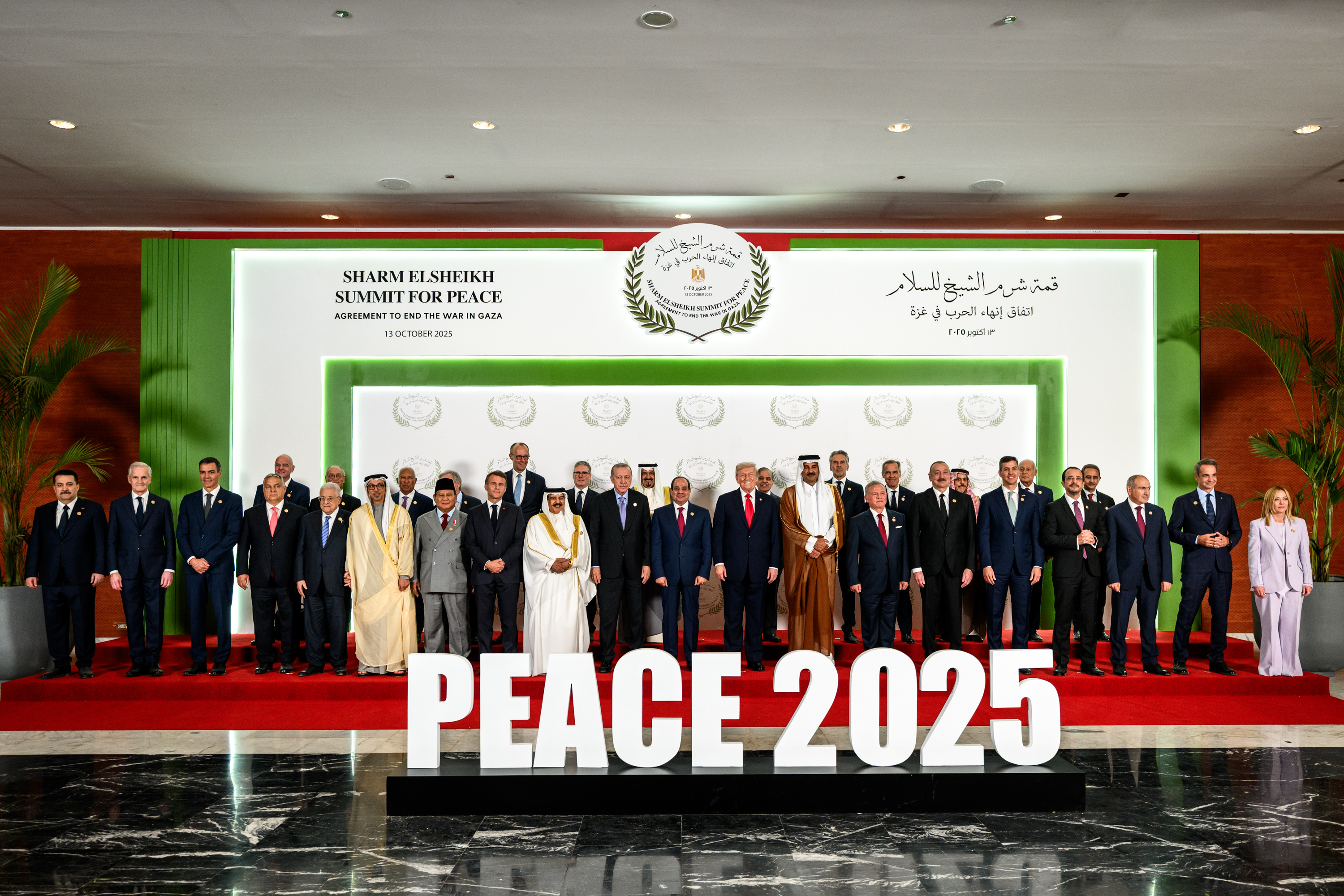
Egyptian President Abdel Fattah el-Sisi and Palestinian President Mahmoud Abbas at the Gaza peace summit in Sharm El Sheikh, Egypt, 13 October 2025

During the Gaza war from 2023, Egypt has provided significant humanitarian aid to the Palestinians through the Rafah border crossing. On 1 November 2023, Egypt has also allowed some wounded Palestinians to enter Egypt for medical care. In the course of these events, Israel had suggested that Egypt should welcome more displaced Palestinians, but Egypt has refused to bear the burden of a mass exodus from Palestine to accommodate millions of Palestinians in their country. The Egyptian leadership had suggested that Palestinian refugees should be accommodated by Israel in the Negev instead. Egypt is already housing 9 million refugees from many other nations, and its economy would not be able to carry such a burden. Egypt’s President Abdel Fattah Al-Sisi has emphasised that the two state solution is paramount to solving the conflict in the long term.

Egyptian President Abdel Fattah el-Sisi, responding to Israel's ban on entering Gaza, stated that his primary responsibility is to protect the lives and security of Egyptian citizens. He affirmed that Egypt would not enter the war. This stance reflects Egypt's traditional role as a mediator in the Palestinian crisis, balancing political support for Gaza with a priority on its internal interests and national security.

== De facto relations ==
In addition to official communication, several practical elements illustrate relations between Palestine and Egypt. One example is the Egypt–Gaza barrier, a wall built by Egypt to prevent crossing of Palestinians. The unique point of crossing, at Rafah, is often closed.

Satellite images from February 2024 show the construction of a buffer zone on the Egyptian side of the border with Palestine. As of September 2025, there is no confirmation that a completed, fully operational buffer zone as depicted in the 2024 satellite images is in place.

== See also ==
- Foreign relations of Egypt
- Foreign relations of Palestine
- Egypt and the Gaza war
- 2000 uprising in Egypt
