= Al-Quds rocket =

Palestinian homemade artillery rocket

The al-Quds 101 Rocket is a homemade artillery rocket made and used by the Palestinian Islamic Jihad for use in attacks against Israel. The al-Quds 101 is most likely similar to the Qassam rocket series used by Hamas.

On February 11, 2006, Islamic Jihad spokesman Abu Hamza reported that the newly developed al-Quds 2 had a length of 2.3 meters and were capable of striking Ashkelon, Israel, from the Gaza Strip.

Islamic Jihad has recently released a video showing the development of a much larger Quds-4 rocket. These rockets cannot be fired precisely to target specific military objectives in or near civilian areas. Human Rights Watch issued an analysis, stating, that "such weapons are therefore indiscriminate when used against targets in population centers. The absence of Israeli military forces in the areas where rockets hit, as well as statements by leaders of Palestinian armed groups that population centers were being targeted, indicate that the armed groups deliberately attacked Israeli civilians and civilian objects." Indiscriminate attacks on civilians and civilian structures that do not discriminate between civilians and military targets are illegal under international law.

== See also ==
- Palestinian domestic weapons production
