= Batar =

Palestinian anti-tank rocket launcher

The Batar (Arabic: البتار) is an anti-tank missile developed by the Izz ad-Din al-Qassam Brigades, the military wing of Palestinian militant group Hamas during the Al-Aqsa Intifada. The weapon was reportedly created and produced in clandestine workshops in the Gaza Strip under the direction of Adnan al-Ghoul until his killing by Israel. It was used for Palestinian rocket attacks on Israel.

The Batar consists of a simple launch tube supported by a tripod and firing a projectile of unknown anti-tank or anti-personnel capabilities. The rear of the rocket is connected to a wire, which allows Hamas militants to fire the projectile from a safe distance.
