= Yasin (RPG) =

Palestinian anti-tank rocket-propelled grenade

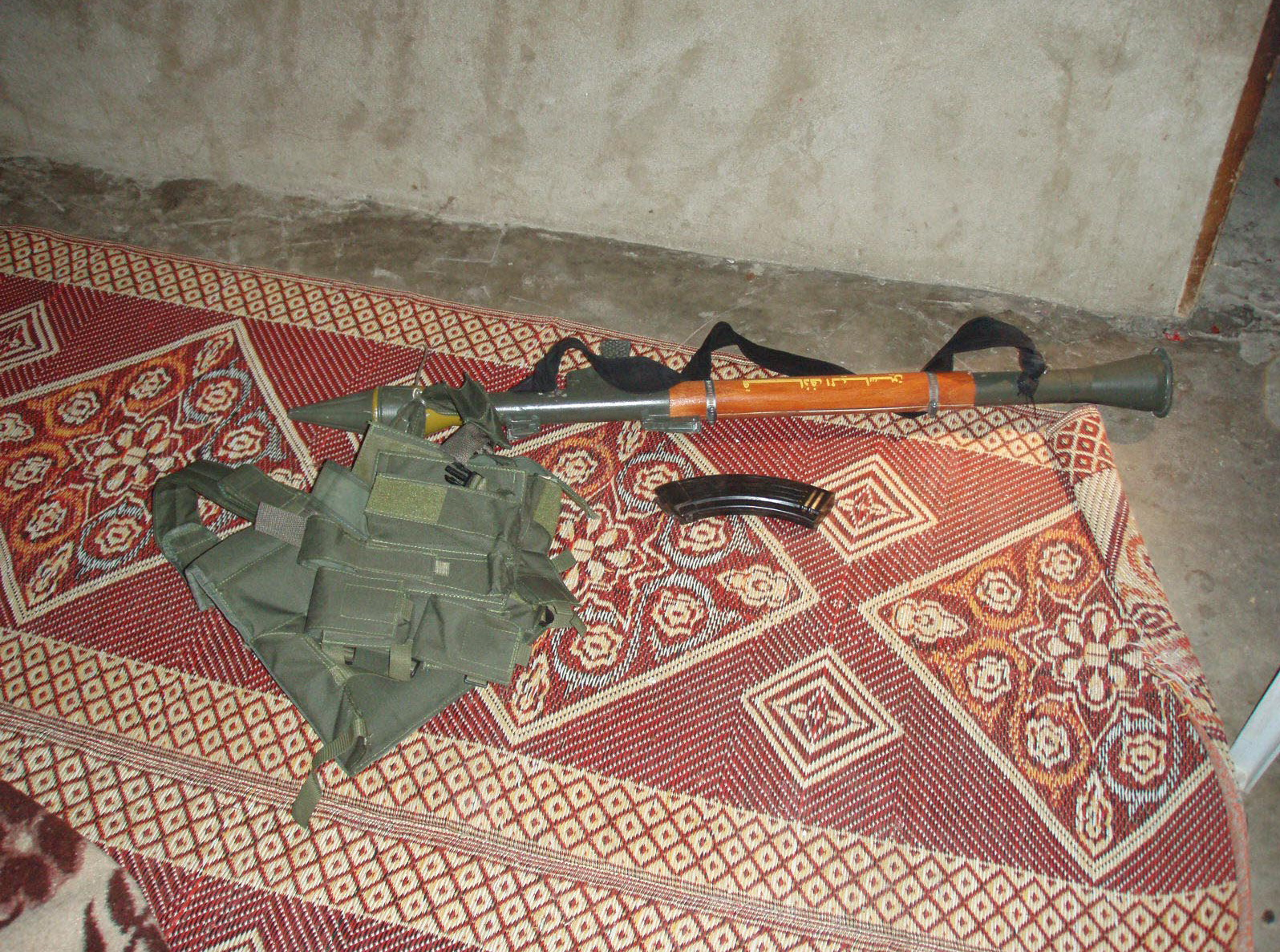
- Yasin RPG with tactical vest and assault rifle magazines found in Beit Hanoun in 2006
- Type: Anti-tank rocket-propelled grenade
- Place of origin: Palestine

Service history
- In service: August 3, 2004–Present
- Used by: Al-Qassam Brigades (Hamas); Al-Aqsa Martyrs' Brigades (Fatah); Abu Ali Mustafa Brigades (PFLP)
- Wars: Second intifada; Gaza War; March 2012 Gaza–Israel clashes; 2012 Israeli operation in the Gaza Strip; 2014 Gaza War; Gaza war

Production history
- Designer: Adnan al-Ghoul
- Designed: Believed to be in 2004
- Manufacturer: Al-Qassam Brigades (Hamas)
- Produced: 2004–present

Specifications
- Mass: 7 kg (15 lb)
- Length: 95 cm (37")
- Crew: 1 or 2
- Caliber: 40 mm (1.57") rocket engine; 85 mm warhead
- Muzzle velocity: 295 m/s
- Effective firing range: 300 m
- Sights: Iron or telescopic sights

The Yasin (Arabic: ياسين), also known as Yassin, or Al-Yassin, is an anti-tank weapon derived from the RPG-7 produced by the Izz ad-Din al-Qassam Brigades, the military wing of Hamas, and first deployed in 2004. It was named after Hamas' spiritual leader, Sheikh Ahmed Yasin, killed by the Israel Defense Forces (IDF) on March 22, 2004.

Primarily used by the Izz ad-Din al-Qassam Brigades, it has also been deployed by other Hamas units in Gaza, including the Executive Force, and Naval Police. Other users include fighters connected to Fatah and the PFLP.

Although intended as an anti-tank weapon, the first version of the Yasin was chiefly operated against soft-skin vehicles and personnel. Later variants like the Yasin 105 have larger warheads.

== History ==
Unveiled on August 30, 2004, the Yasin was reportedly developed by Hamas engineers from the Research and Industry Unit, directed by Adnan al-Ghoul, killed in Gaza by the IDF on October 22, 2004.

First used against Israeli soldiers and Palestinian police officers in 2005, after the 2006 Lebanon War, production was accelerated in anticipation of an armed conflict with Israel. During the 2006 Gaza conflict, there were reports of its use against Israeli forces in the Gaza Strip, as well as at Beit Lahiya. On August 14, 2007, Hamas reported firing a Yasin at an Israeli tank in Khan Yunis. During the Gaza War (2008–09), Hamas Naval Police officers were reportedly trained in its use.

In 2018, Israeli intelligence claimed Yasin warheads were being converted into balloon-based IEDs, since improvements to the armor used by Israeli military vehicles made them obsolete in their primary role.

== Design ==
The Yasin's design was influenced by the RPG-2 and RPG-7. From the former, it used the rocket launcher tube design and the warhead's external shape and rocket motor which are very simple. From the latter, it copied the enhanced warhead and the divergent nozzle at the launcher's rear to deflect recoil generated by launching the rocket with a rocket booster attached to the propelled grenade to extend its range. The large cone at the back end of the Yasin launcher is thus typical of the RPG-7.

The RPG is reported to be made in small underground workshops, with an explosive filler made from molten TNT and powdered ammonium nitrate. While it has a claimed effective range of 300 meters, the Israeli Intelligence and Terrorism Information Center (ITIC) suggests a range between 200 and 250 meters. It is more effective in urban warfare, able to destroy brick walls and penetrate a 21 cm steel plate from 150 meters, closely matching the ITIC estimate of 200 mm (20 cm).

Continued efforts to upgrade the Hamas-made RPG to penetrate protective armor lead to the development of the "Tandem 85" rocket, using a tandem-charge system designed to be more effective against reactive armor, followed by the "Al-Yassin 105" rocket. The Yasin 105 is reported to have first seen action during the Gaza war.
