= Gaza War (2008–2009) =

Armed conflict in the Gaza Strip

- Part of the Gaza–Israel conflict
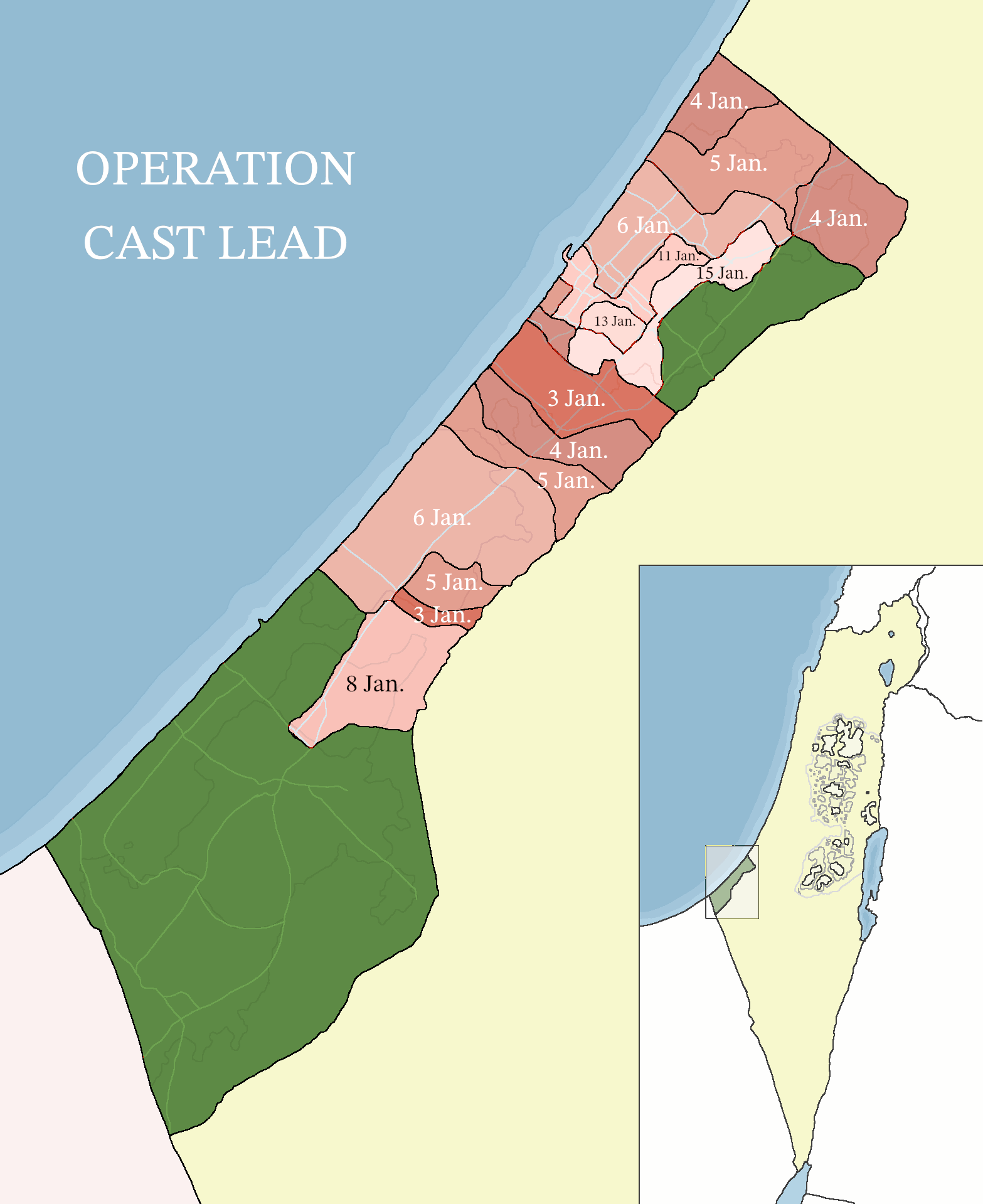
- Israeli advances in Gaza during 2009
Date	27 December 2008 – 18 January 2009 (3 weeks and 1 day)
Location	Gaza Strip and Southern Israel
Result	Israeli military victory: IDF-declared unilateral ceasefire; 12 hours later, Hamas announced a one-week ceasefire.; Humanitarian crisis and deterioration of infrastructure and basic services in Gaza.; Temporary reduction in the number of rockets fired from the Gaza Strip.; See results

Belligerents
Israel; Israel Defense Forces; Israel Security Agency	Gaza Strip; Hamas; (Hamas) Al-Qassam Brigades; Popular Front for the Liberation of Palestine; (Popular Front for the Liberation of Palestine) Abu Ali Mustapha Brigades; Islamic Jihad Movement in Palestine; (Palestinian Islamic Jihad) Al-Quds Brigades; Ex-Fatah; Al-Aqsa Martyrs' Brigades; Popular Resistance Committees; (Popular Resistance Committees) Al-Nasser Salah al-Deen Brigades

Commanders and leaders
(Israel) Ehud Olmert; Prime Minister (Israel) Ehud Barak; Minister of Defense (Israel) Gabi Ashkenazi; Chief of General Staff (Israel) Yoav Galant; Southern Command (Israel) Ido Nehoshtan; Air Force (Israel) Eli Marom; Navy (Israel) Eyal Eisenberg; Gaza Division (Israel) Yuval Diskin; Internal Security Service	Khaled Mashal; Ismail Haniyeh; Mohammed Deif; Abu Zakaria al-Jamal †; Ahmed Jabari; Osama Mazini; Nizar Rayan †; Mahmoud al-Zahar (Palestinian Islamic Jihad) Ramadan Shallah (Popular Front for the Liberation of Palestine) Jamil Mezher

Strength
IDF: 4,000–20,000 deployed in ground invasion and tens of thousands of reservists mobilized (176,000 total active personnel)	Hamas (Al-Qassam Brigades and paramilitary police): 20,000 (est. total); Other Palestinian paramilitary forces: 10,000

Casualties and losses
Total killed: 13; Soldiers: 10 (friendly fire: 4); Civilians: 3 Total wounded: 518; Soldiers: 336; Civilians: 182	Total killed: Per PCHR: 1,417 (17% combatants); Per Al Mezan: 1,409 (17% combatants); Per B'Tselem: 1,391 (25% combatants); Per IDF: 1,166 (61% combatants); Per GHM: 1,440; Total wounded: 5,303 (per PCHR) Total captured: 120 (per IDF)
- One Egyptian border guard officer killed and three wounded, and two children wounded. Over 50,800 Gaza residents displaced. Over 4,000 homes destroyed; around $2bn worth of damage to Gaza
- *255 (PCHR) or 265 (B'Tselem) police officers were killed.

The Gaza War, also known as the First Gaza War, Operation Cast Lead, (Note: Hebrew: מִבְצָע עוֹפֶרֶת יְצוּקָה) or the Gaza Massacre, (Note: Arabic: مجزرة غزة) and referred to as the Battle of al-Furqan (Note: معركة الفرقان) by Hamas, was a three-week armed conflict between Gaza Strip Palestinian paramilitary groups and the Israel Defense Forces (IDF) that began on 27 December 2008 and ended on 18 January 2009 with a unilateral ceasefire. The conflict resulted in 1,166–1,417 Palestinian and 13 Israeli deaths. Over 46,000 homes were destroyed in Gaza, making more than 100,000 people homeless.

A six month long ceasefire between Israel and Hamas ended on 4 November, when the IDF entered Deir al-Balah to destroy a tunnel, killing several Hamas militants. Israel said the raid was a preemptive strike in the wake of Hamas intentions to abduct Israeli soldiers, while Hamas characterized it as a ceasefire violation, and responded with rocket fire into Israel. Attempts to renew a truce between Israel and Hamas were unsuccessful. On 27 December, Israel began Operation Cast Lead with the stated aim of stopping rocket fire. Israel attacked police stations, military targets including weapons caches and suspected rocket firing teams, as well as political and administrative institutions in Gaza, Khan Yunis and Rafah. After hostilities broke out, Palestinian groups fired rockets in retaliation. The international community considers indiscriminate attacks on civilians and civilian structures as illegal under international law.

The Israeli ground invasion began on 3 January. On 5 January, the IDF began operating in densely populated urban centers of Gaza. During the last week of the offensive (from 12 January), Israel struck Palestinian rocket-launching units. Hamas intensified its rocket and mortar attacks against civilian targets in southern Israel, reaching Beersheba and Ashdod. The conflict ended on 18 January. The IDF declared a unilateral ceasefire, followed by Hamas' announcing a one-week ceasefire twelve hours later. The IDF completed its withdrawal on 21 January.

In September 2009, a UN special mission, headed by the South African Justice Richard Goldstone, produced a report accusing both Palestinian militants and the Israeli army of war crimes and possible crimes against humanity, and recommended bringing those responsible to justice. In 2011, Goldstone wrote that he did not believe that Israel intentionally targeted civilians in Gaza as a matter of policy. The other authors of the report, Hina Jilani, Christine Chinkin, and Desmond Travers, stated that no new evidence had been gathered to dispute the report's findings. On 21 September 2012, the United Nations Human Rights Council wrote that 75% of the homes damaged in the attacks remained in a state of disrepair.

== Background ==
On February 8, 2005, Mahmoud Abbas, and Israeli prime minister Ariel Sharon signed a ceasefire agreement to bring an end to the Second Intifada. On 17 March 2005, the 13 main Palestinian factions including Hamas and Islamic Jihad agreed to the February agreement, conditional on cessation of Israeli attacks. Israel maintained that its occupation of Gaza ended following the completion of its unilateral disengagement plan in September 2005. Because Israel continued to control Gaza's airspace and territorial waters, and restrict the movement of people or goods in or out of Gaza, overseeing the actions of the population in the Gaza Strip, the UN, the International Criminal Court Human Rights Watch, and other NGOs consider Israel the occupying power.

Hamas abided by the ceasefire agreement for 14 months, until IDF naval shelling hit a Gaza beach, killing seven civilians, on 10 June 2006.

After the political victory of a Hamas-led government in March 2006, The Quartet (the United States, Russia, United Nations, and European Union) conditioned future foreign assistance on the future government's commitment to nonviolence, recognition of the state of Israel, and acceptance of previous agreements. Hamas rejected the demands, calling the conditions unfair and endangering the well-being of Palestinians, leading to Quartet suspension of its foreign assistance program and to Israel imposing economic sanctions. In a widely cited article, David Rose outlined material suggesting that the United States and Israel then attempted to have the Palestinian National Authority stage a coup to overturn the election results, a manoeuvre Hamas is said to have preempted in Gaza with its takeover from Fatah.

In June 2007, following Hamas's takeover of Gaza from Fatah, Israel imposed a ground, air, and maritime blockade, and announced it would allow only humanitarian supplies into the Strip. Palestinian groups were partially able to bypass the blockade through tunnels, some of which are said to have been used for weapons smuggling. According to a US diplomatic cable that quoted Israeli diplomats, Israel's policy was to "keep Gaza's economy on the brink of collapse". After a three-and-a-half-year legal battle waged by the Gisha human rights organization, the Coordinator of Government Activities in the Territories (COGAT) finally released a 2008 document that detailed its "red lines" for "food consumption in the Gaza Strip", in which a calculation was made of the number of calories needed to be provided to Gaza by external sources to avoid malnutrition. COGAT said that the document was a draft, and never discussed nor implemented. An Israeli appeal court disagreed.

Between 2005 and 2007, Palestinian groups in Gaza fired about 2,700 locally made Qassam rockets into Israel, killing four Israeli civilians and injuring 75 others. During the same period, Israel fired more than 14,600 155 mm artillery shells into the Gaza Strip, killing 59 Palestinians and injuring 270. According to the Office for the Coordination of Humanitarian Affairs, between 2005 and 2008, 116 Israelis, including civilians and Israeli security forces, which includes Israeli police, Israeli Border Police and members of the armed services, were killed in both Israel and the Palestinian Territories in "direct conflict related incidents" and 1,509 were injured. During this time, 1,735 Palestinians, including civilians and militants from various groups, were killed and 8,308 wounded in "direct conflict related incidents".

=== 2008 six-month ceasefire ===
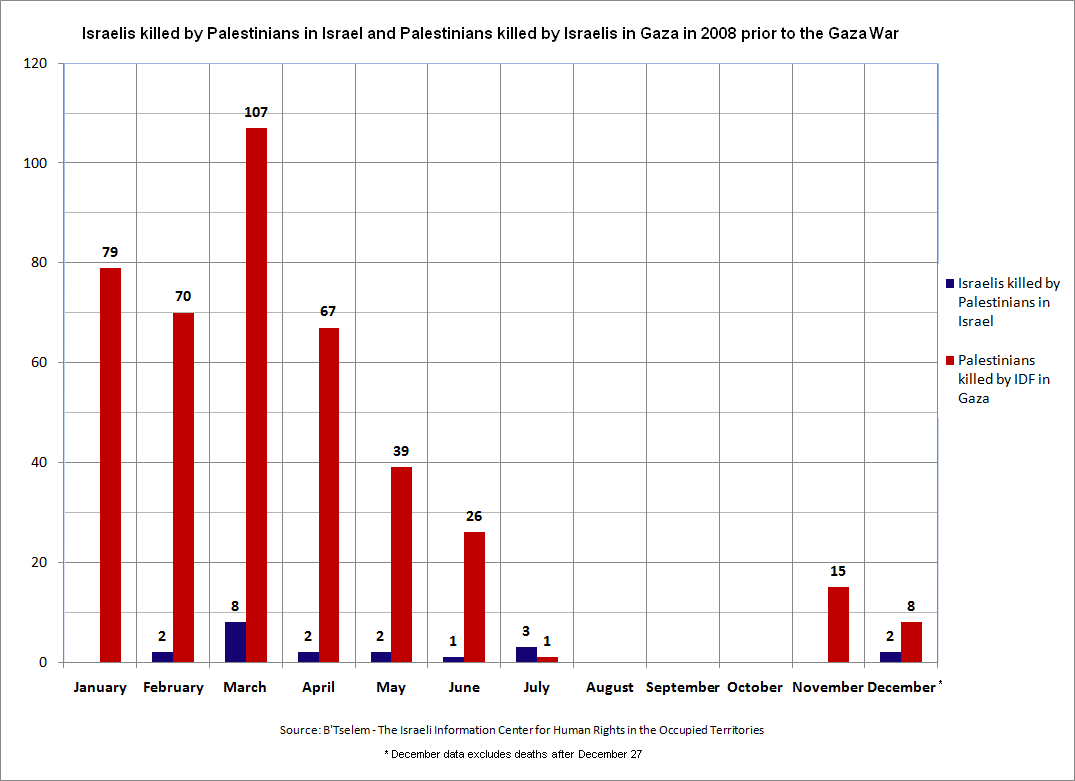
Palestinians killed by the IDF in Gaza (red) and Israelis killed by Palestinians in Israel (blue) during January–December 2008 according to B'Tselem

Rocket hits in Israel, January–December 2008

Israel had been preparing to intervene militarily in the Gaza Strip since March 2007. In June as talks for a negotiated agreement between the two parties were underway, the defense minister Ehud Barak ordered the IDF to prepare operational plans for action within the Strip. On 19 June 2008, an Egyptian-brokered six-month "lull" or pause in hostilities between Israel and Hamas went into effect. The agreement had no mutually agreed text or enforcement mechanism and eventually collapsed. The lull agreed to was thought necessary to allow time for the IDF to prepare its operation.

The agreement required Hamas to end rocket and mortar attacks on Israel, while that country would cease attacks on and military incursions into Gaza, plus progressively ease the blockade of Gaza over a thirteen-day period.

Points on which there was not mutual agreement included an end to Hamas' military buildup in Gaza and movement toward the release of Corporal Shalit.

Hamas called on all of Gaza's militant groups to abide by the truce, and was confident they would do so. Defense Ministry Official Amos Gilad, the Israeli envoy to the talks, stressed that Israel demanded a ceasefire, meaning that even one single rocket fired will be seen as a violation of the agreement. He added that Egypt, on its side, was committed to preventing the smuggling activity from Gaza. Gilad also said that Israel would hold Hamas responsible for attacks from Gaza. In a British Foreign Affairs Committee investigation, Dr Albasoos said that "Unfortunately, on 4 November 2008, the Israeli army killed six Palestinians. I was leaving the Gaza Strip to come to the UK that same night. I remember when the Israeli army invaded the middle area of the Gaza Strip, killing six Palestinians. It was outrageous from their side to come and breach that ceasefire. I believe that Palestinian political factions, including Hamas, committed to that ceasefire and still have the intention to renew it in the near future, as soon as possible." In rebuttal, Ms Bar-Yaacov said that "The Israelis had added a condition to the tahdia (truce), being concerned that Hamas was building tunnels to go under the Israeli border and kidnap more Israeli soldiers. The condition stated that if Hamas came within 500 metres of the border, they (the IDF) would attack and that is exactly what happened (on 4 November 2008)." British barrister and professor Geoffrey Nice, and General Nick Parker, opined during a lecture that "Building a tunnel was not a breach of the ceasefire but the armed incursion into Gaza definitely was."

==== Implementation ====
Pre-5 November 2008: "The ceasefire has brought enormous improvements in the quality of life in Sderot and other Israeli villages near Gaza, where before the ceasefire residents lived in fear of the next Palestinian rocket strike. However, nearby in the Gaza Strip, the Israeli blockade remains in place and the population has so far seen few dividends from the ceasefire."

Hamas was careful to maintain the ceasefire. Despite Israel's refusal to comply significantly with the truce agreement to end the siege/blockade, Hamas brought rocket and mortar fire from Gaza to a virtual halt during the summer and fall of 2008. Hamas "tried to enforce the terms of the arrangement" on other Palestinian groups, taking "a number of steps against networks which violated the arrangement", including short-term detention and confiscating their weapons, but it could not completely end the rocket and mortar shell attacks by these rogue factions in Gaza. Hamas had sought support in Gazan public opinion for its policy of maintaining the ceasefire. On 2 August there were massive clashes in Gaza City after Hamas had stepped up its campaign to curb Fatah from attacking Israel

The truce started uneasily with the UN recording seven IDF violations of the ceasefire between 20 and 26 June. On various occasions Israeli forces shot at farmers, wood collectors and fishermen in Gaza territory, seriously injuring two farmers. Subsequently, between 23 and 26 June, nine Qassam rockets were fired at Israel in three separate violations by Palestinian groups not affiliated with Hamas. No Israelis were injured. Islamic Jihad reportedly fired the rockets in retaliation for Israeli assassinations of their members in the West Bank.

According to sources close to the ceasefire negotiations, after 72 hours from the start of the ceasefire, the crossing points would be opened to allow 30 per cent more goods to enter the Gaza strip. Ten days after that (i.e. thirteen days after the ceasefire began), all crossings would be open between Gaza and Israel, and Israel will allow the transfer of all goods that were banned or restricted to go into Gaza. Therefore, besides firing on and killing Gaza citizens, Israel failed further to comply with these truce obligations to ease the blockade that were crucial to all groups in Gaza. Islamic Jihad put pressure on Hamas to press Israel to comply with this vital part of the truce. The Carter Center recorded, based on U.N. OCHAO data, that instead of easing the blockade according to the agreed schedule, "... despite the 97% drop in attacks, the truce did not do much to ease the siege of Gaza. Imports increased only marginally ... only 27% of the amount of goods entering in January 2007" were allowed through at best. No exports were allowed. After the June 2008 ceasefire, the number of Palestinians entering and exiting Gaza at the Rafah crossing with Egypt increased slightly, with 108 people leaving in August 2008, but this number decreased soon after to only one in October 2008. The passage of Gazans through the Erez crossing reveal similar low numbers. Historian Ian Bickerton argues that Israel's failure to comply with the terms of the truce made conditions harder in Gaza.

Even though not part of the generally accepted truce terms, by 23 June 2006 Hamas and Israel began talks, via an Egyptian intermediary, regarding the release of the captured IDF soldier, Shalit.

"As of 15 August, the UN reported that Israel was allowing a few new items into Gaza (including limited supplies of cement, clothes, juices, and agricultural materials) but said that overall humanitarian conditions had not significantly improved since the cease-fire began". After a few weeks of calm, clashes resumed. On 12 September the IDF shot and seriously wounded an unarmed Palestinian who strayed close to the border. A retaliatory rocket was fired. On 16 September IDF troops entered central Gaza to bulldoze land along the border fence. On 23 September, the UN reported, "Although the cease-fire has afforded the populations in southern Israel and Gaza greater security, there has been no corresponding improvement in living conditions for the population in Gaza." After the initial increase of goods allowed into Gaza to 30% of the 2007 levels, OCHAO data shows that the through-flow then fell rapidly through the September–October lull in rocket fire to below even pre-June levels.

Notwithstanding Hamas not having fired a single rocket during the truce prior to 5 November 2008, Israel accused Hamas of bad faith and of violations of the Egyptian-mediated truce. Even though neither was included as Hamas obligations under the generally accepted terms of this truce, Israel noted that rocket fire from Gaza never stopped entirely ("between June 19 and November 4, 20 rockets, and 18 mortar shells were fired at Israel") and that weapons smuggling was not halted, Hamas, in turn, accused Israel of non-compliance with the truce by never allowing the major renewal of goods' flow into Gaza and of conducting raids that killed Hamas fighters.

During October 2008 Israel-Palestinian violence fell to its lowest level since the start of the al-Aqsa intifada in September 2000. One rocket and one mortar shell were fired at Israel in October. However, during the same period several Israeli violations were reported: In South Gaza on 3 October the IDF fired on two unarmed Palestinians near the border and sent soldiers into the strip to arrest them and detain them in Israel. On 19 October IDF bulldozers entered Gaza. On 27 October IDF soldiers fired into Gaza for unknown reasons damaging a school in Khuza'a and injuring one child. Palestinian fishing boats off the Gaza coast were fired upon on four separate occasions during the month wounding two fishermen, one of them seriously. According to Mondoweiss, for the entire duration of the 2008 Hamas–Israel cease-fire – even after the Israeli raid of a Hamas tunnel on 4 November – not a single person was killed by rocket or mortar fire into Israel.

== Pre-war escalations ==
=== 4 November IDF raid and aftermath ===
On 4 November 2008, Israel launched a cross-border military raid (variously also referred to as an attack / invasion / incident / military event / incursion) code named Operation Double Challenge into a residential area of Dayr al-Balah in central Gaza to destroy the opening of a tunnel concealed within a building 300 meters from the fence on the Gaza Strip border. Professor Sir Geoffrey Nice QC and General Sir Nick Parker observed that "[b]uilding a tunnel was not a breach of the ceasefire but the (IDF) armed incursion into Gaza definitely was." Various outlets and authors reported this Israeli action as breaking the June truce. According to The Telegraph, writing as Cast Lead began, the 4 November operation "sealed the fate of the ceasefire". Author Avi Shlaim wrote in 2015 that the "...ceasefire had a dramatic effect in de-escalating the conflict.....It was Israel that violated the ceasefire. On 4 November 2008 the (IDF) launched a raid into Gaza and killed 6 Hamas fighters. That was the end of the ceasefire." and that Hamas had set a "good example" in respecting the ceasefire. The raid, according to Mark LeVine was unprovoked. Israel stated its aim was to destroy what it said was a tunnel on the Gaza-Israel border dug by militants to infiltrate into Israel and abduct soldiers. While accusing Hamas of plotting to dig a tunnel under the border, Israeli defense official was quoted in The Washington Times as separately acknowledging that Israel wanted to "send Hamas a message". According to Israel, the raid was not a violation of the ceasefire, but a legitimate step to remove an immediate threat. The 2009 Report of the United Nations Fact-Finding Mission on the Gaza Conflict noted that "the ceasefire began to founder on 4 November 2008 following an incursion by Israeli soldiers into the Gaza Strip".

==== Tunnel threat ====
Dr. Ido Hart, an Israeli defence analyst specialising in underground warfare, defined three types of Gaza tunnels, namely those intended for smuggling from Egypt, those which are defensive in nature, designed for storage and protection, and those that are offensive, permitting cross-border penetrations into Israel by Gaza militants. "Once you find the entrance, you have to climb inside to know whether it is a defensive or offensive tunnel". Defensive tunnels have served as an 'escape hatch' for senior Hamas officials during Israeli invasions. "The purpose of the defensive tunnels is to enable the Hamas command structure to reside safely underground while their armed forces conduct a mobile defence against Israeli forces. Robert Pastor, who was intimately involved in the indirect 2008 Hamas-Israel negotiations, stated "There is some dispute as to whether that tunnel was intended to capture an Israeli soldier or whether it was a defensive tunnel to protect against an Israeli incursion. Later, once a new ceasefire had been negotiated, Pastor was quoted as saying that "Hamas officials asserted, however, that the tunnel was being dug for defensive purposes, not to capture IDF personnel" and furthermore that an IDF official had confirmed that fact to him.

The IDF allegation that the tunnel attacked by it on 4 November 2008 was offensive, aimed at abducting IDF soldiers and posing an imminent threat, was also reported with doubt by various other players and commentators, such as UNDPR which wrote "IDF special forces had entered the area to blow up a tunnel dug by Hamas for allegedly kidnapping IDF soldiers." Another example is the Israeli daily Ha'aretz that wrote "(The tunnel was) dug ostensibly to facilitate the abduction of Israeli soldiers, (but the tunnel) was not a clear and present danger". Former U.S. President Jimmy Carter wrote, "Israel launched an attack in Gaza to destroy a defensive tunnel being dug by Hamas inside the wall that encloses Gaza." The Journal of Palestine Studies favourably referenced Norman Finkelstein: "Israel broke the cease-fire by killing seven Palestinian militants, on the flimsy excuse that Hamas was digging a tunnel to abduct Israeli soldiers, and knowing full well that its operation would provoke Hamas into hitting back." Noam Chomsky observed: "The pretext for the raid was that Israel had detected a tunnel in Gaza that might have been intended for use to capture another Israeli soldier; a 'ticking tunnel' in official communiques. The pretext was transparently absurd, as a number of commentators noted. If such a tunnel existed, and reached the border, Israel could easily have barred it right there."

==== Raid ====
A paratroopers reconnaissance battalion commanded by Yaron Finkelman, supported by tanks and bulldozers crossed the border and penetrated about 250 meters into the Gaza Strip to destroy the tunnel. A firefight broke out, in which one Hamas fighter was killed. Hamas responded with a barrage of mortar and rocket fire at Israeli troops. Three Israeli airstrikes on Hamas mortar and rocket positions then killed five Hamas fighters. According to eyewitnesses, another three Hamas fighters were wounded in an Israeli UCAV strike over the el-Burejj refugee camp. Three Israeli soldiers were also wounded during the operation. Hamas said it would take revenge for what it perceived as an act of Israeli aggression that had violated the truce. Hamas launched 35 rockets into southern Israel in what was described by Hamas spokesman Fawzi Barhoum as a "response to Israel's massive breach of the truce", stating that "[t]he Israelis began this tension and they must pay an expensive price. They cannot leave us drowning in blood while they sleep soundly in their beds." The blockade of Gaza was tightened further the following day.

==== Immediate repercussions ====
The intensity of rocket attacks targeted at Israeli cities near Gaza sharply increased after the 4 November 2008 cross-border IDF attack, approaching pre-truce levels. Clashes between Israeli troops and Palestinian militants also took place along the border, during which 11 Palestinian militants were killed. According to CAMERA, in the period between 4 November incident and mid-December, more than 200 Qassam rockets and mortar shells landed in the western Negev region, most fired immediately after the 4 November tunnel raid by the IDF, and thereafter decreasing to a "few per day". Israel had frequently shut down the crossings in response to rocket attacks on its towns.

=== December repercussions ===
On 13 December, Israel announced that it favored extending the cease-fire, provided Hamas adhered to the conditions. On 14 December, a Hamas delegation in Cairo proposed that Hamas was prepared to stop all rocket attacks against Israel if the Israelis would open up the Gaza border crossings and pledge not to launch attacks in Gaza, as per the original June 2008 truce terms, to that date not complied with by Israel. On the same day, Hamas officials said that earlier reports, quoting Khaled Meshaal as saying there would be no renewal of the truce, were inaccurate. A Hamas spokesman said that the lull would not be renewed, "as long as there is no real Israeli commitment to all of its conditions". A spokesman for the Israeli Prime Minister replied that Israel was committed to the truce but "it's clear there cannot be a one-sided ceasefire, ... where rockets are everyday coming from the Gaza Strip targeting Israeli civilians."

On 15 December, Israel assassinated a senior Palestinian commander in Jenin, sparking a round of attacks between Israel and Hamas.

On 17 December, a 40-year-old Palestinian was killed by IDF fire in Northern Gaza. The following day, 18 December, Hamas declared the end of the cease-fire, a day before the truce officially expired. More than 20 rockets were fired from Gaza into southern Israel on that day.

On 19 December, Hamas refused to enter talks to renew the six-month truce and a Hamas spokesman announced that it would not extend the cease-fire. The spokesman, Ayman Taha, specified that Hamas's refusal was "because the enemy did not abide by its obligations" to ease a crippling blockade of the Gaza Strip, and had not halted all attacks. Palestinian sources said that Hamas wanted to renew the truce, but only on improved terms – a complete opening of the border crossings with Israel, the opening of the Rafah border crossing with Egypt, a complete ban on Israeli military activity in Gaza and an extension of the truce to the West Bank as well. Israel was not ready to accept these terms. This was confirmed by Yuval Diskin, head of Shin Bet (Israel's internal security agency), at an Israeli cabinet meeting on 21 December. Diskin said he thought Hamas was "interested in continuing the truce, but wants to improve its terms ... it wants us to lift the siege of Gaza, stop attacks, and extend the truce to include the West Bank". Three Qassam rockets fired from the northern Gaza Strip landed in Israel.

On 22 December, Israeli defense minister Ehud Barak said that his country will not accept the ongoing rocket fire from the Palestinian militants in the Gaza Strip, Israeli foreign minister Tzipi Livni, who had supported the truce until recently, suggested that military actions be taken against the Hamas government in Gaza.

On 23 December, senior Hamas leader Mahmoud al-Zahar said that Hamas was willing to renew the cease-fire under the original terms, demanding an Israeli commitment to refrain from any military operation in the Strip and to keep the border crossings open. Speaking with Egyptian newspaper al-Ahram, al-Zahar said that the movement would reassess the situation in Gaza once the 24 hours during which Hamas vowed to halt rocket fire had ended. Despite the temporary ceasefire declared by the armed Palestinian factions, eight Qassam rockets and eight mortar shells hit the Negev. Also that day, Israel Defense Forces killed three Palestinian militants, stating they were planting explosives on the border.

On 24 December, an Israeli airstrike hit a group of militants in the Gaza Strip. An Israeli military spokesman said that the militants had fired mortars at Israel. Palestinian medics said that one Hamas militant was killed in the strike and two other Palestinians were wounded, including a cameraman from Hamas' television station. On that day, Hamas military wing issued a statement saying that it began an operation code-named "Operation Oil Stain". 87 Palestinian mortar shells, Katyusha and Qassam rockets hit the Negev. Hamas said that it would expand the "Oil Stain" and put thousands of Israelis "under fire". Hamas said it was ready for the war: "far greater than surrendering to Israeli threats and that they became much more prepared to counter Israeli aggression and to defend themselves than in the past."

On 25 December, after Israel had "wrapped up preparations for a broad offensive", Israeli Prime Minister Ehud Olmert delivered a final warning in an interview with the Arabic language satellite channel al-Arabiya. He said "I am telling them now, it may be the last minute, I'm telling them stop it. We are stronger." Another six Qassams landed in southern Israel.

== Timeline of the war ==
=== Israeli offensive ===
Israel began planning for a military operation as early as six months before the conflict by collecting intelligence on potential targets. The IDF also engaged in a disinformation campaign to give Hamas a false sense of security and to take them by surprise. Defense minister Ehud Barak stated that the offensive was the result of Israel's "patience running out" over the rocket attacks, which had been restarted by Hamas after Israel destroyed a tunnel on 4 November. According to Israeli officials, its subsequent 27 December offensive took Hamas by surprise, thereby increasing militant casualties.

==== Air strikes ====
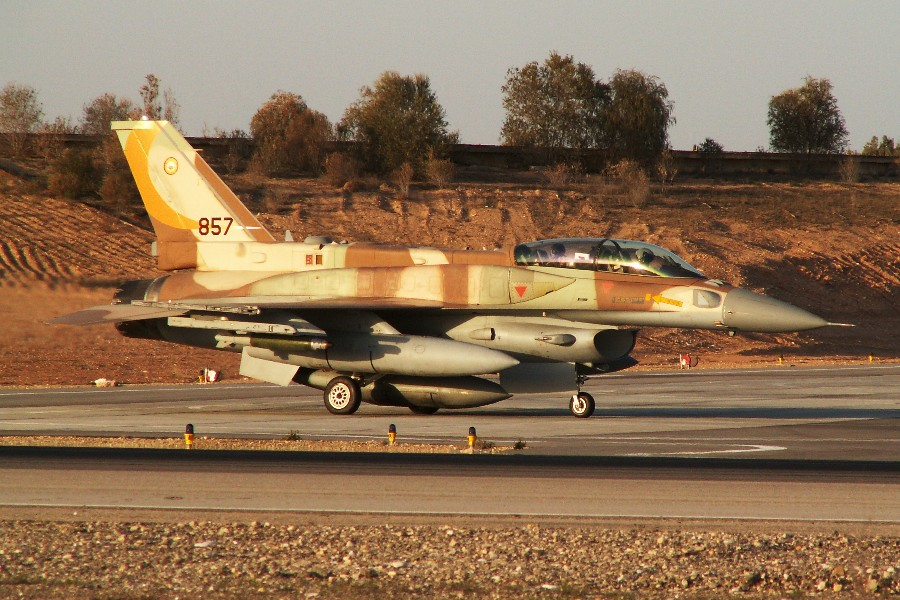
Israeli F-16I of the 107th Squadron preparing for takeoff

At 11:30 am on 27 December 2008, Israel launched the campaign titled Operation Cast Lead. It began with an opening wave of airstrikes in which F-16 fighter jets and AH-64 Apache attack helicopters simultaneously struck 100 preplanned targets within a span of 220 seconds. There was a 95% success rate with zero misses in the opening attack according to the Israeli Air Force. Thirty minutes later, a second wave of 64 jets and helicopters struck at an additional 60 targets. The air strikes hit Hamas headquarters, government offices and 24 police stations. An Israeli UAV airstrike on the police headquarters of Gaza City killed 40 people, including several dozen police cadets at their graduation ceremony. Approximately 140 members of Hamas were killed, including Tawfik Jaber, head of Gaza's police force. Another estimate puts the death toll of the police academy strike at 225 Hamas militants killed and 750 injured. Israeli Foreign Minister Tzipi Livni told reporters that Israel would strike all targets associated with what she called the "illegitimate, terrorist government of Hamas".

At least 225–230 Palestinians were killed and more than 700 injured on the first day of air strikes. Civilians, including children, were among the casualties. Although media reported that most of the dead were "Hamas security forces" or "Hamas operatives", police officers are, according to B'Tselem, presumed to be civilians and likely not legitimate objects of attack under international humanitarian law. Human rights groups critically note that the attacks began around the time children were leaving school. The Israeli attack was the deadliest one-day death toll in 60 years of conflict between the Israelis and Palestinians, a day that was called the "Massacre of Black Saturday" by Palestinians in Gaza. Hamas responded with a rocket barrage on Southern Israel, and Palestinian factions in the Gaza Strip kept Southern Israel under constant rocket fire during the entire war. Beersheba suffered two rocket attacks, the farthest Palestinian rockets had ever reached. Palestinian rocket fire killed three Israeli civilians and one soldier in the early days of the conflict.

In the weeks following the initial air raids F-16Is and AH-64 Apaches continued to target Hamas facilities while also inflicting severe damage to Palestinian infrastructure. Israel used the 2000-pound Mark 84 Joint Direct Attack Munition to attack buildings and tunnels along the Gaza-Sinai border. The 500-pound variant was used against underground bunkers. Israel also used the new PB500A1 laser-guided hard-target penetration bomb, which was developed by Israel Military Industries, and is based on the 1000-pound Mark 83. There were unconfirmed reports of the IAF also using the GBU-39 Small Diameter Bomb for the first time. Israeli aircraft also used synthetic aperture radar targeting pods and high-resolution imaging pods. After being grounded six months prior, the Israeli fleet of AH-1F Cobra helicopter gunships were rushed back into service for the operation.

According to the IAF, 80% of the bombs used by the IAF were precision weapons, and 99% of the air strikes hit their targets. A study by the Center for Strategic and International Studies points out that when possible, IAF executed strikes using the smallest precision-guided weapons, and coordinated air strikes and the use of artillery weapons using GPS, in a systematic effort to limit collateral damage. In a 2009 interview, Major General Ido Nehushtan said that the only use of non-precision-guided munitions from the Israeli Air Force was in open areas. He went on to say: "We had to find ways to do things as precisely and proportionately as possible, while focusing on how to differentiate between terrorists and uninvolved civilians."

The IDF also targeted homes of Hamas commanders, noting: "Destruction of hundreds of Hamas leaders' homes [is] one of the keys to the offensive's success. The homes serve as weapons warehouses and headquarters, and shelling them has seriously hindered Hamas capabilities." Several high-ranking Hamas commanders were killed, including Nizar Rayan, Abu Zakaria al-Jamal, and Jamal Mamduch. Hamas leaders often died along with their families in their homes. According to a Hamas spokesperson and Rayyan's son, the IDF warned Rayan, by contacting his cell phone, that an attack on his house was imminent. Israel alleged that Hamas leaders hid in the basements of the Shifa Hospital complex in Gaza City in the belief that they would be protected by human shields. Gaza Interior Minister Said Seyam, Gaza Interior Ministry Security Director Saleh Abu Sharkh, and local Hamas militia leader Mahmoud Abu Watfah were killed on 15 January in an Israeli airstrike in Jabalia.

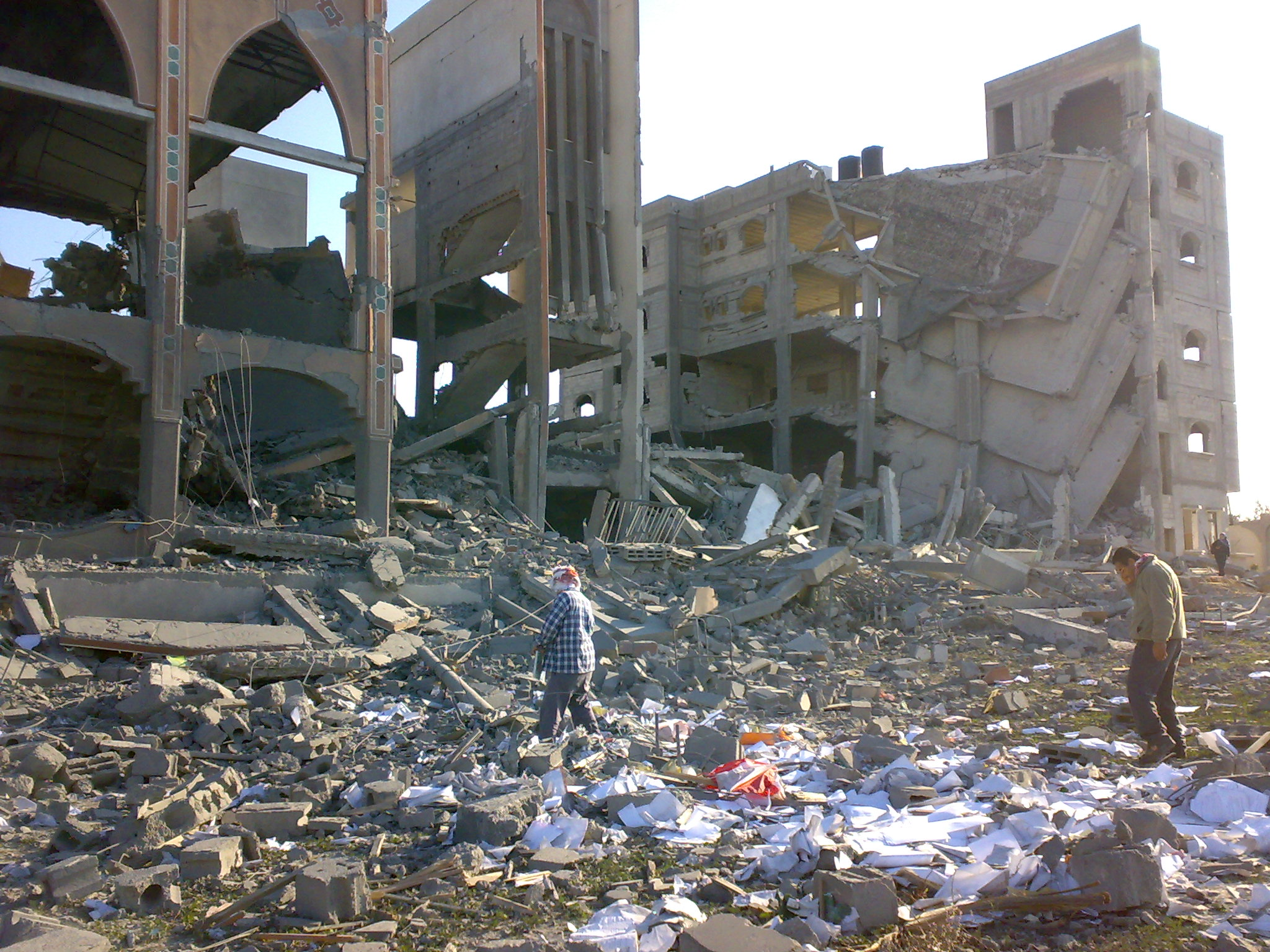
Destroyed building in Rafah, 12 January 2009

Among IDF's measures to reduce civilian casualties were the extensive use of leaflets and phone messages to warn Palestinians, including families in high-risk areas and families of Hamas personnel, to leave the area or to avoid potential targets. Israel used A-4 Skyhawks to deliver more than 2 million leaflets urging the population to evacuate. In a practice codenamed roof knocking, the IDF issued warning calls before air strikes on civilian buildings. Typically, Israeli intelligence officers and Shin Bet security servicemen contacted residents of a building in which they suspected storage of military assets and told them that they had 10–15 minutes to flee the attack. At several instances, the IDF has also used a sound bomb to warn civilians before striking homes. In some cases, IDF commanders called off airstrikes, when residents of suspected houses have been able to gather on its roof. IAF developed small bomb that is designed not to explode as it was aimed at empty areas of the roofs to frighten residents into leaving the building. Israel's military used low-explosive missiles to warn civilians of imminent attack and to verify that buildings were evacuated before attacks. Some of the attacks took place sooner than the warning suggested and many calls were not followed up with attacks.

By 3 January 2009, the Palestinian death toll stood at 400, with 25% estimated to be civilian casualties. The air offensive continued throughout the ground invasion that followed, and as of 15 January Israeli forces had carried out 2,360 air strikes. No safe haven or bomb shelters existed, making this one of the rare conflicts where civilians had no place to flee.

==== Naval operations ====
The Israeli Navy attacked Hamas' rocket launchers and outposts, command and control centers, a Hamas patrol boat, and the office of Hamas Prime Minister Ismail Haniyeh, using the Typhoon Weapon System and Surface to surface missiles. The navy coordinated with other Israeli forces and used powerful shipboard sensors to acquire and shell targets on land. Records of the attacks published by the navy indicate that for the first time vessels were equipped with Spike ER electro-optically guided anti-armor missiles. Videos of an attack showed precision hits from a Typhoon stabilizing gun despite a rolling sea. Versions of the Spike were also used by ground units and possibly by helicopters or unmanned aerial vehicles. Shayetet 13 naval commandos were also deployed to attack targets on land, and reportedly attacked an Iranian ship loaded with arms for Hamas, which was docking in Sudan. On 28 December, Naval vessels shelled the Port of Gaza.

On 29 December, the Free Gaza Movement relief boat Dignity carrying volunteer doctors with 3.5 tons of medical supplies, human rights activists (Among them Caoimhe Butterly and former US Representative Cynthia McKinney), and a CNN reporter was involved in an altercation with Israeli patrol boats. The captain of the Free Gaza vessel said that their vessel had been rammed intentionally and that there had been no warning before it had been rammed. An Israeli spokesman disputed this, and said the collision was caused by the Dignity attempting to outmaneuver the patrol boats after disobeying Israeli orders to turn back.

On 4 January the Israeli Navy extended its blockade of the Gaza Strip to 20 nautical miles.

Throughout the war, the Israeli Navy employed Sa'ar 4.5 class missile boats of Shayetet 3 and Super Dvora Mk III class patrol boats of the Squadron 916.

==== Ground invasion ====
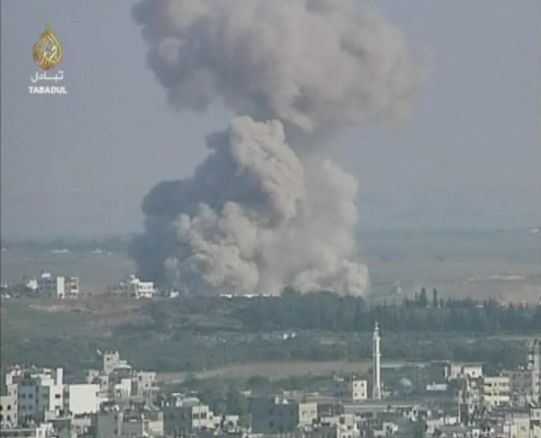
Explosion in Gaza, 12 January 2009

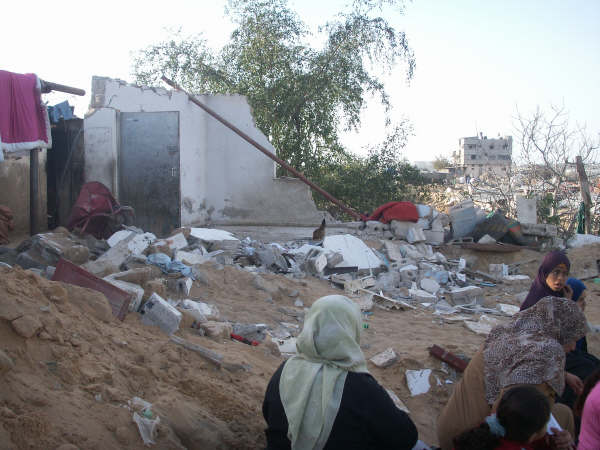
Damage to the Zeitoun neighbourhood

On the evening of 3 January, Israel began the ground operation with a massive artillery barrage all along the Gaza boundary, and ground forces were sent into Gaza for the first time since the start of the conflict. The ground invasion, termed the 'second stage' of Operation Cast Lead, sought to control open areas and encircle towns and refugee camps from which militants continued to launch rockets, but not penetrate densely populated areas.

The Paratroopers, Golani, and Givati brigades simultaneously entered the Gaza Strip from several unexpected directions to avoid reported booby traps while also outflanking opposing forces. The 401st Armored Brigade used Merkava Mark IV tanks to quickly block access from Rafah and Khan Yunis to Gaza City, cutting supply lines to Hamas from the south. The move put psychological pressure on Hamas while also forcing combatants to withdraw from the front line. Israeli forces took strategic hilltops to better control areas.

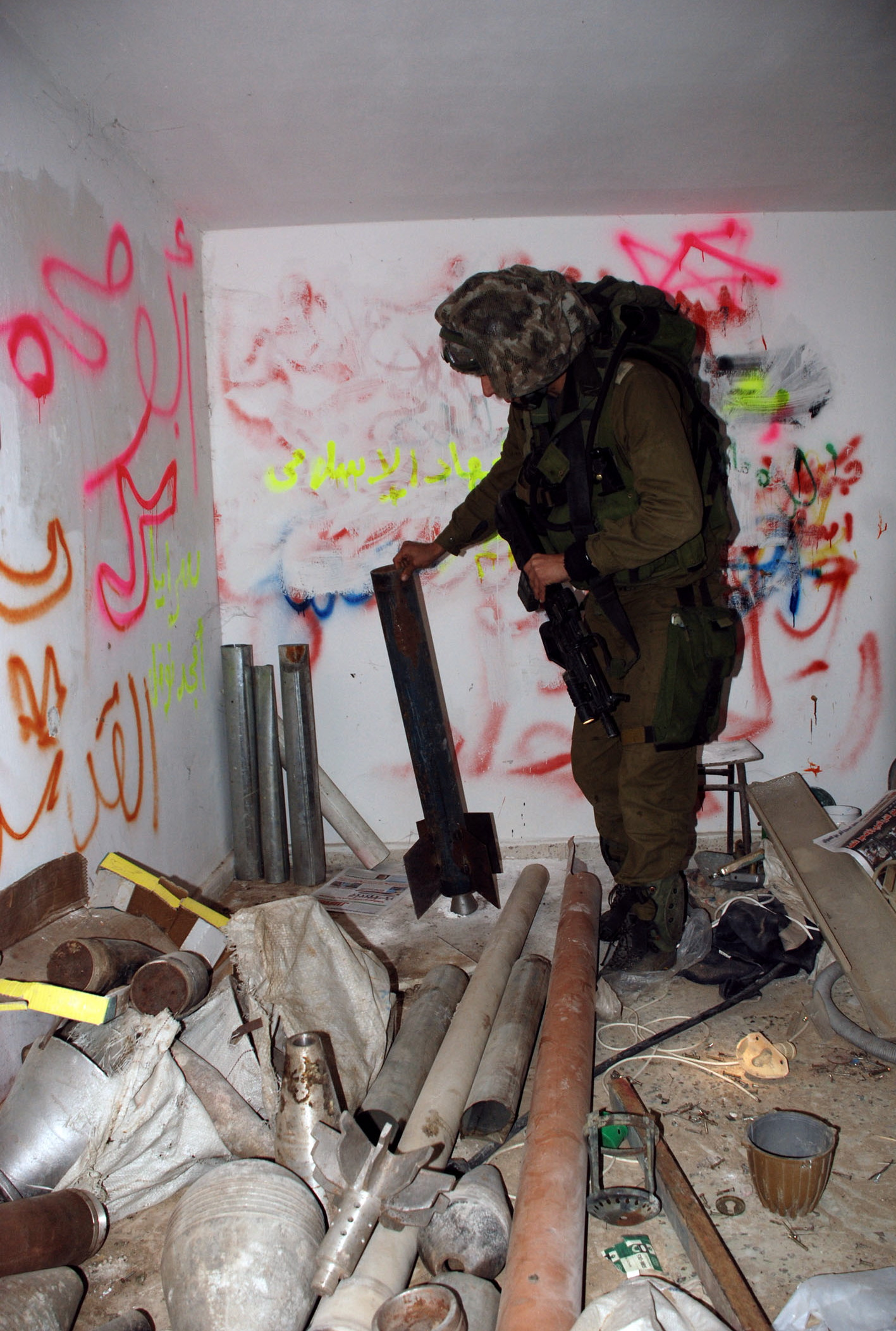
Photograph released by the IDF allegedly showing weapons found in a mosque during Operation Cast Lead

The Israeli advance was spearheaded by Combat Engineering Corps sappers opening routes and allowing the ground forces to advance while dismantling booby traps set up in great numbers by Hamas, often set to detonate upon entry to a building. Improvised explosive devices (IED) were a concern for Israeli soldiers. One Israeli commander said that booby traps were found in a mosque and one-third of the houses. He said that some of the traps were designed to assist in taking IDF soldiers captive. All such attempts failed. The IDF used D9 armored bulldozers to ensure that paths were cleared of IEDs. These bulldozers were also used to destroy tunnels. The unmanned, remote-controlled version of the D9 (called Black Thunder) were also used. In one case an armored D9 knocked down a door, which triggered an explosion of a building full of explosive on top of the D9. The D9 survived the explosion and building's collapse. Combat engineers that inspected the rubbles found a tunnel, cache of weapons and remains of a suicide bomber. Viper miniature robots were deployed by Israeli forces for the first time. These were used for various tasks including the disabling of IEDs. Along with blocking mobile phone communication, the IDF employed electronic jamming equipment to disable remote operated explosives. Among others, The IDF used the new Bull Island system for the first time to identify booby traps in buildings. Bull Island uses a camera shaped like a tennis ball that can be thrown into a building to transfer 360-degree imagery to the troops outside of the structure.

Israeli artillery units worked closely with battalion commanders. For the first time, the Sheder Ham digitized data, mapping, and command-and-control system linked the Artillery Corps into the Army's overall C4I network.

The Oketz Unit, the IDF's dog-handling corps, performed 33 successful missions during the war, with specially trained sniffer and attack dogs and their handlers leading advancing forces. In every mission that involved Oketz dogs, there were no casualties among soldiers. Three dogs were killed by enemy fire during the war.

Israeli ground troops entered Beit Lahiya and Beit Hanoun in northern Gaza in the early hours of 4 January. Israeli forces reportedly bisected Gaza and surrounded Gaza City. The IDF stated that it had targeted forty sites, including weapons depots and rocket launch sites. The Israeli military said that 50 Hamas fighters were killed and dozens more wounded. At least 25 Palestinian rockets were fired into Southern Israel, wounding a woman in Sderot.

As Israeli tanks and troops seized control of large parts of the Gaza Strip, tens of thousands of Gazans fled their homes amid artillery and gunfire, and flooded into the inner parts of Gaza city. On 5 January, IDF forces began operating in the densely populated urban centers of Gaza. Gun battles broke out between the IDF and Hamas on the streets of Gaza as the IDF surrounded the city. IDF combat units were sent in to capture Hamas fighters, and were met with grenades and mortar fire. The Israeli military said that 80–100 Hamas fighters were killed and 100 captured during heavy ground fighting. Some 40 rockets and mortar shells were fired at Israel, injuring four civilians.

On 6 January, heavy fighting took place between Israeli troops and Palestinian militants on the outskirts of the northern district of Gaza City, while Israeli helicopter gunships pounded militant positions. The IDF reportedly widened its attacks to Khan Yunis in southern Gaza, after heavy fighting on the edges of Deir al-Balah in central Gaza. The Al Fakhura school was hit by Israeli mortar fire, and reports on deaths and if militants were among the casualties varied. The attack was originally reported as being on the school. In northern Gaza City, Palestinian gunmen ambushed an Israeli patrol, killing one soldier and wounding four. The patrol returned fire, hitting some of the gunmen, while in Jabalya, an Israeli tank fired a shell into an abandoned building as Golani Brigade soldiers were taking cover in it, killing 3 soldiers and wounding 24. The casualties were extracted under the cover of heavy artillery fire and helicopters dropping illumination bombs. In a separate friendly fire incident, an Israeli officer was killed by a misdirected artillery shell. In all, at least 70 Palestinians and 5 Israelis were killed on 6 January.

==== Arms interdiction and the Sudan strike ====
In January and February 2009, there was a series of two air strikes in Sudan and one in the Red Sea allegedly conducted by Israel against a convoy of 17 trucks containing Iranian arms, possibly Fajr-3 artillery rockets, being smuggled to the Gaza Strip through Sudan. A total of 39 were reported killed, with Iranian Revolutionary Guard operatives possibly among the dead. The attack was widely reported to have been conducted by Israeli aircraft, while the Israeli government hinted that it was behind the attack. Naval commandos from the elite Shayetet 13 unit were reportedly involved in the operation, which included an attack on an Iranian arms ship docking in Port Sudan.

==== Attack on Gaza City ====
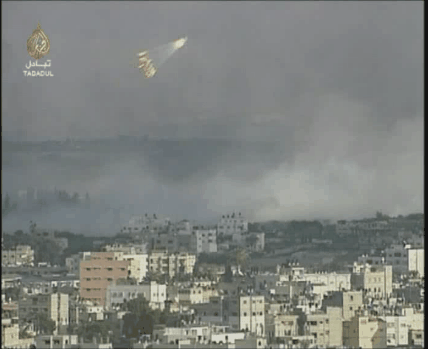
White phosphorus artillery shell exploding over Gaza City on the 11 January

On 7 January, Israel carried out 40 airstrikes overnight. Dozens of other targets were attacked by aircraft and artillery during the day, and the Gaza-Egypt border was bombed after Israeli aircraft dropped leaflets onto Rafah, urging the residents to leave. A total of 20 Palestinians were killed. A total of 20 rockets were fired into Southern Israel. Israel temporarily halted its attacks for three hours to provide a "humanitarian respite". In Central Gaza, a force of IDF soldiers entered a building near the Kissfum crossing. As the force entered, Hamas fighters fired an anti-tank rocket at them, killing one Israeli officer and wounding one soldier. Israeli aircraft also hit more than 40 Hamas targets in Gaza. Israeli troops shot and killed Hamas commander Amir Mansi and wounded two other Hamas fighters as they operated a mortar.

On 11 January, the IDF started the third stage of the operation with an attack on the suburbs of Gaza City. Israeli forces pushed into the south of the city and reached a key junction to its north. During their advance, Hamas and Islamic Jihad fighters ambushed Israeli troops at several locations, and heavy fighting ensued, in which 40 Hamas and Islamic Jihad fighters were killed. Additionally, the IAF reported that Hamas operatives had tried to shoot down an IAF plane with anti-aircraft missiles for the first time since operations in Gaza began. Heavy machine gun fire against helicopters had also been unsuccessful. Two Hamas fighters were killed by an Israeli airstrike in the Southern Gaza Strip. A Palestinian woman was also killed by Israeli artillery fire. Israeli forces continued to push deeper into heavily populated areas around Gaza City. Fierce clashes were reported in the Southern suburb of Sheikh Ajleen.

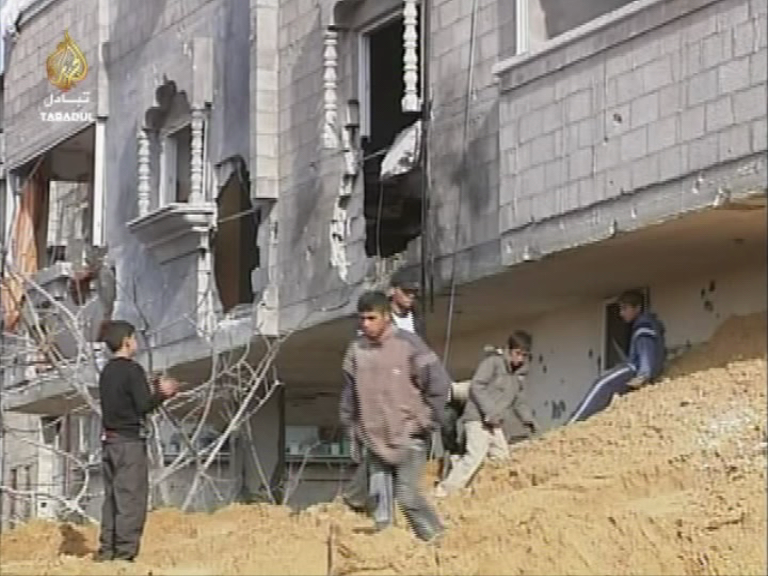
Palestinians in a Gaza city neighbourhood on Day 18 of the War in Gaza

On 13 January, Israeli tanks continued their advance toward the headquarters of Hamas' preventive security building from the al-Karramah neighborhood in the northwest and the Tel al-Hawa neighborhood in the northeast. The Israeli Army also said that 25 mortars and rockets were fired into Southern Israel. Before dawn, during the night, Israeli troops and tanks supported by artillery and helicopters advanced 300 metres into Tel al-Hawa, a neighborhood with several high-rise buildings, while Israeli gunboats shelled Hamas targets along the coast. As troops entered the narrow streets, heavy street fighting with militants ensued leaving three Israeli soldiers wounded and 30 Hamas militants dead or wounded, according to the IDF. By morning IDF soldiers were still advancing slowly towards the city center and several buildings were in flames in Tel al-Hawa, where most of the fighting took place. Five Israeli soldiers were wounded during clashes with militants, and an officer was severely wounded by an explosion inside a booby-trapped building. The push into the neighborhood was Israel's deepest incursion into Gaza City. There was widespread desertion by members of the Qassam Brigades in the face of the IDF advance.

On 15 January, Israeli artillery started an intense bombardment of the city while fighting was still going on in the streets. Troops and tanks advanced deeper into the city following the shelling. The Israeli military claimed to have killed dozens of militants since breaching the city limits four days earlier, while they suffered 20–25 soldiers wounded. Among buildings hit by shellfire was the al-Quds hospital, Gaza's second-largest, in the Tel al-Hawa neighborhood. At least 14 rockets were fired from Gaza into Israel, wounding five and severely damaging a house in Sderot.

Almost all members of Hamas' approximately 100-man strong "Iranian Unit" were killed during a battle in the Zeytoun neighborhood on 15 January. Members of the military wing had previously travelled to Iran for training by the Iranian Revolutionary Guard. According to Palestinian sources, Iran was preparing for an end to the fighting and promised money and resources to rebuild military capabilities and infrastructure destroyed during the fighting.

The headquarters of the United Nations Relief and Works Agency (UNRWA) was also shelled on 15 January. There were 3 people injured and tons of food and fuel intended for 750,000 Palestinian refugees were destroyed. The Associated Press initially reported that an anonymous Israeli military official stated that Gaza militants had fired anti-tank weapons and machine guns from inside the compound. Israeli Prime Minister Ehud Olmert said "it is absolutely true that we were attacked from that place, but the consequences are very sad and we apologize for it, I don't think it should have happened and I'm very sorry." After UNRWA dismissed this as "nonsense", Israel ordered an army investigation into the incident. Israeli officials afterwards "came forward to say that preliminary results showed that the militants ran for safety inside the U.N. compound after firing on Israeli forces from outside".

On 16 January, more than 50 Israeli airstrikes were carried out against militants, tunnels, and a mosque suspected of being used as a weapons store. Israeli forces continued their push into Gaza City, while Israeli Navy vessels shelled militant targets in support. About 10 rockets were fired into Southern Israel.

The Givati Brigade penetrated the deepest into Gaza City. The brigade's reconnaissance battalion swept into the Tel al-Hawa neighborhood and took over two 15-story buildings in search of Hamas operatives two days before the cease fire went into effect. About 40 Palestinian fighters were killed during the operation. The commander of the brigade, Colonel Ilan Malka, was critical of Hamas' use of civilian houses and said that he "took many steps to prevent our soldiers from getting hurt". Malka told reporters that the IDF had initially predicted each battalion would lose six or seven soldiers.

The Israeli government considered a third phase of the operation with the intent of dealing a "knock out blow" to Hamas. Military and intelligence assessments indicating that shifting the goal to destroying Hamas would require additional weeks of deep ground incursions into urban areas and refugee camps. This was expected to result in heavy casualties on both sides and among civilians, reduce the strong domestic support for the war, and increase international criticism.

==== Humanitarian ceasefires ====
Due to the number of civilian casualties and the deteriorating humanitarian situation, Israel faced significant international pressure for a ceasefire, the establishment of a humanitarian corridor, access to the population of Gaza and the lifting of the blockade. On 7 January, Israel opened a humanitarian corridor to allow the shipment of aid into Gaza. The Israeli army agreed to interrupt fighting for three hours and Hamas agreed not to launch rockets during the pause. Israel repeated the ceasefire either daily or every other day. Aid officials and the UN praised the truce, but said it was not enough as fighting usually resumed immediately following the humanitarian ceasefires. An independent report commissioned jointly by the Israeli NGO Physicians for Human Rights and the Palestinian Medical Relief Society notes that according to testimonies by local witnesses, there were several cases where IDF ground forces breached the daily ceasefire agreement.

=== Palestinian paramilitary activity ===
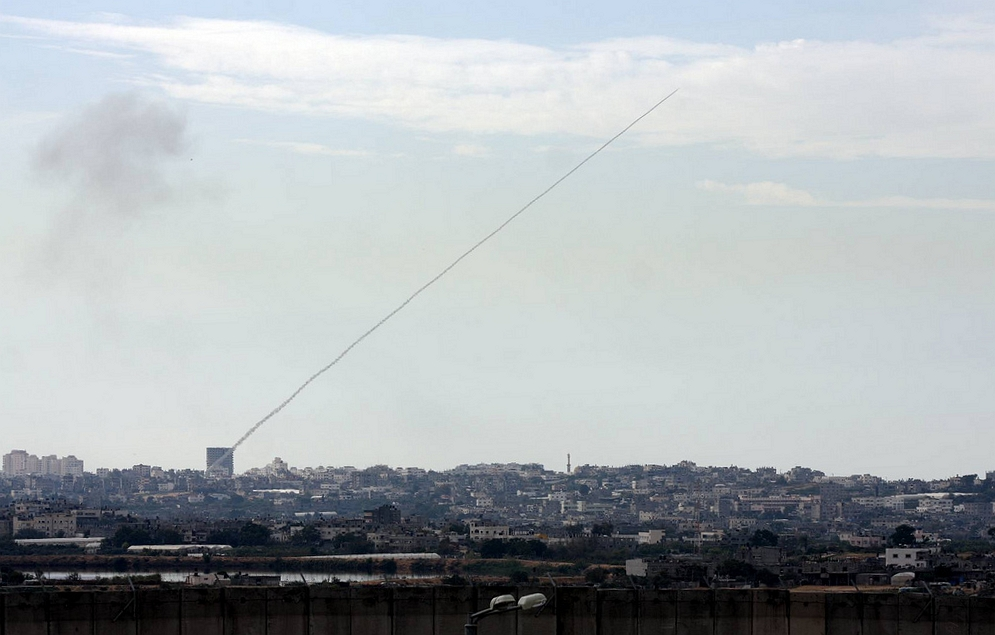
According to Human Rights Watch rockets from Gaza were fired from populated areas.

According to Abu Ahmed, the official media spokesman of the Al-Quds Brigades, the military wing of the Palestinian Islamic Jihad movement, Palestinian paramilitary factions in Gaza worked together, operationally and otherwise, to repel the Israeli attack on Gaza. Abu Ahmed told Asharq al-Awsat during the war that, "everybody helps everybody else with regards to food, weapons, and first aid; there is no difference between a member 'Al Quds Brigade' or 'Al Qassam Brigade [military wing of Hamas]' or 'Al-Aqsa Martyrs Brigade' or 'Abu Ali Mustafa Brigade [military wing of Popular Front for the Liberation of Palestine or PFLP]'. For everybody's goal is the same and their compass is pointing in the same direction, and that is to drive out the occupation and defeat them, and disrupt their plan to dissolve the Palestinian Cause." Hamas said that "rockets fired from Gaza were meant to hit military targets, but because they are unguided, they hit civilians by mistake."

Political representatives for Hamas, Islamic Jihad, the PFLP, Saiqa, the Popular Struggle Front, the Revolutionary Communist Party, Palestinian Liberation Organization, Fatah's 'Intifada' faction, and a number of other Palestinian factions in Syria formed a temporary alliance during the offensive as well. They issued a joint statement refusing "any security arrangements that affect the resistance and its legitimate right to struggle against the occupation", and refusing proposals suggesting international forces be sent to Gaza. The coalition also affirmed that any peace initiatives must include an end to the blockade, and an opening of all of Gaza's crossings, including the Rafah crossing with Egypt.

==== Preparation ====
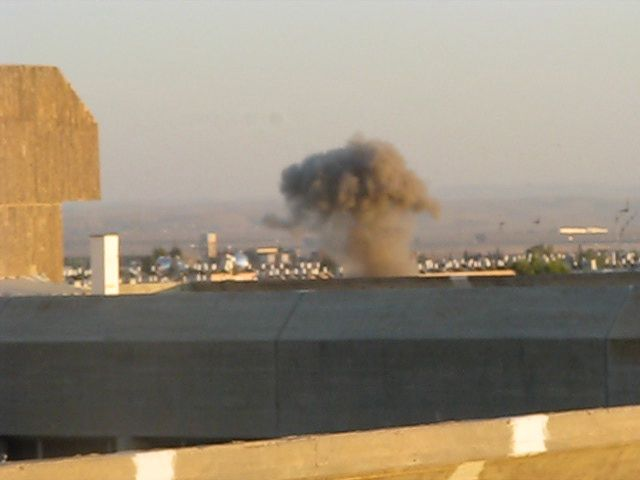
A Grad rocket hitting Beersheba

Hamas used the months leading to the war to prepare for urban warfare, which was to give them a chance to inflict casualties on the Israeli military. Militants booby-trapped houses and buildings and built an extensive system of tunnels in preparation for combat. A Hamas fighter reported that the group had prepared a tunnel network in Gaza city that would allow Hamas to engage the IDF in urban warfare. IDF commanders said that many Hamas members have dug tunnels for themselves under their homes and hid weapon caches in them. Some houses were booby-trapped with mannequins, explosives and adjacent tunnels: Israeli officers said that houses were set up this way so that "Israeli soldiers would shoot the mannequin, mistaking it for a man; an explosion would occur; and the soldiers would be driven or pulled into the hole, where they could be taken prisoner." A colonel estimated that one-third of all houses encountered were booby-trapped. IDF Brigadier-General Eyal Eisenberg said that roadside bombs were planted in TV satellite dishes, adding that Hamas booby-trapping of homes and schools was "monstrous" and "inhumane". Ron Ben-Yishai, an Israeli military correspondent embedded with invading ground forces, stated that entire blocks of houses were booby-trapped and wired in preparation for urban confrontation with the IDF. Israel said a map showing the deployment of explosives and Hamas forces in the al-Atatra neighborhood in northern Gaza was found. The map reportedly showed that Hamas placed many explosives and firing positions in residential areas, several mosques, and next to a gas station. Israel deployed the elite Sayeret Yahalom combat engineering unit throughout the brigades with new equipment including miniature robots and improved wall-breaching munitions to counter the booby-traps.

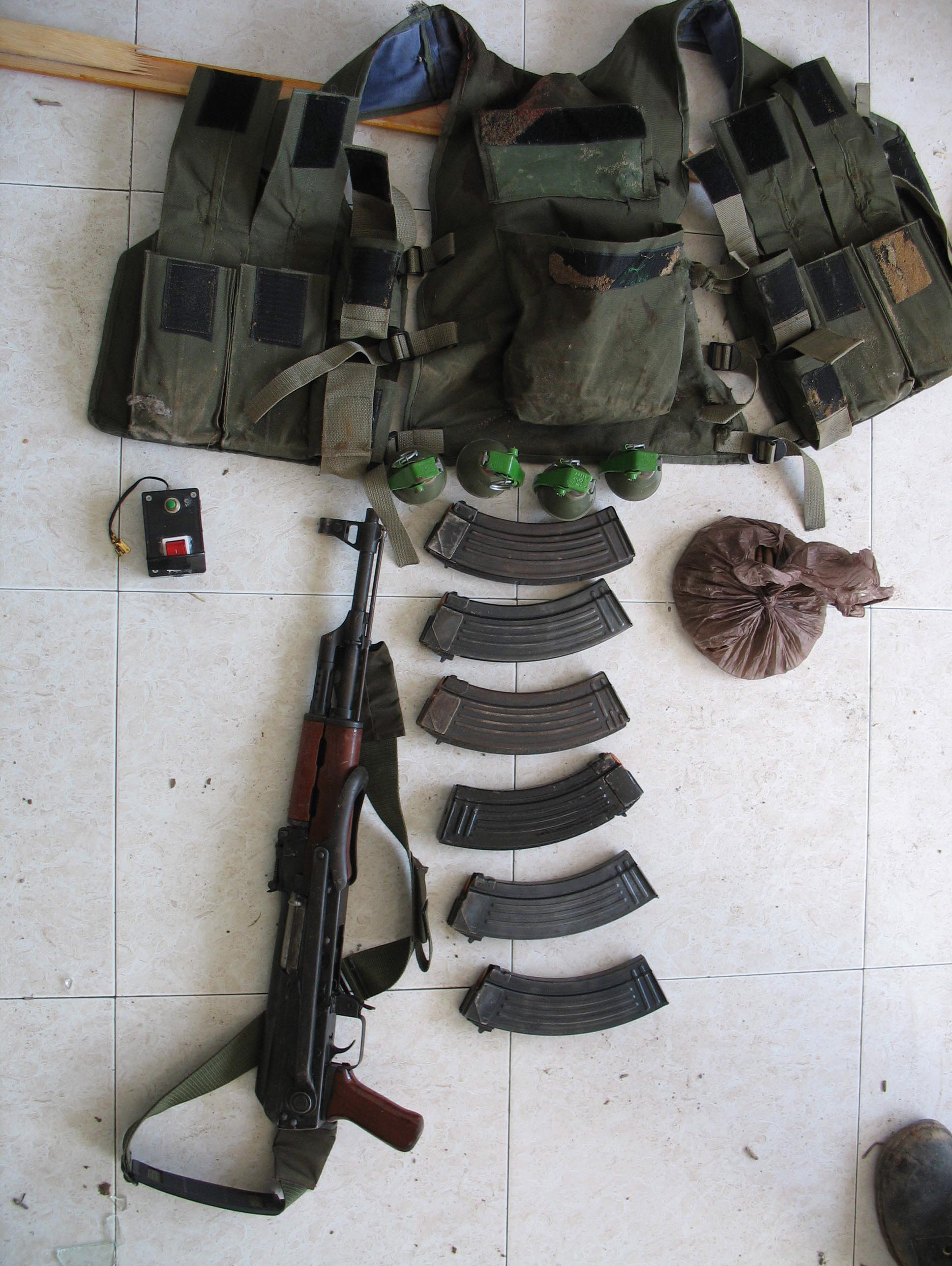
An example of a weapons cache found in northern Gaza

According to Jane's Defence Weekly, armed groups in Gaza counted domestically produced anti-armor RPGs like al-Battar and Banna 1 and Banna 2 in their arsenal. Hamas and Islamic Jihad also manufactured a variety of improvised explosive devices (IEDs), some of which were anti-personnel bombs and others were planted on the sides of roads or underground to be activated against tanks and armored personnel carriers. According to The Jerusalem Post, some of the IEDs were manufactured from medicine bottles transferred to the Gaza Strip as humanitarian aid by Israel. The same newspaper also reported that Hamas representatives said they were fighting with the aid of armored vehicles and weapons confiscated from the Palestinian National Authority, given by Israel, the United States and other countries.

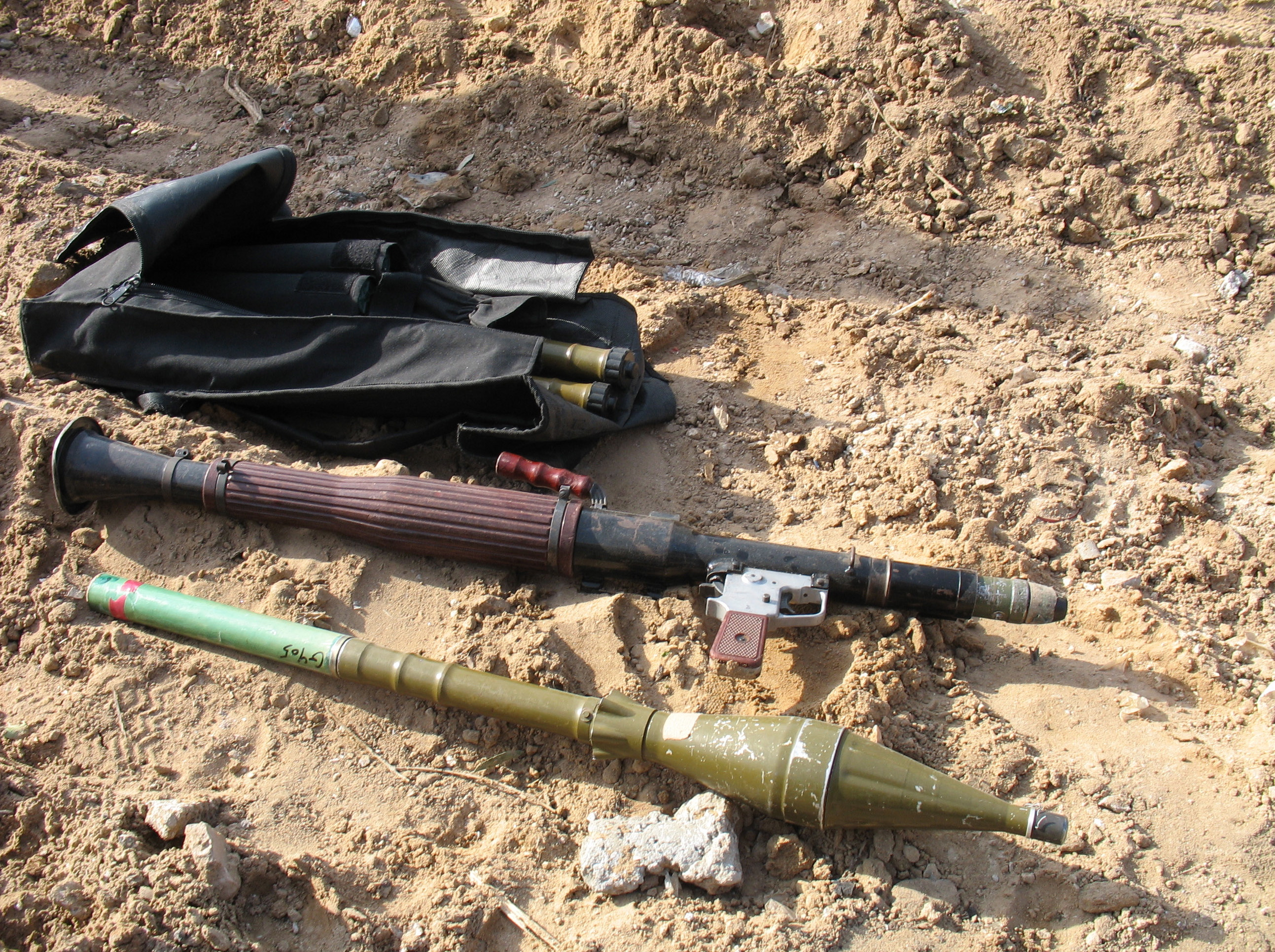
A weapons cache in found in northern Gaza

At least one Palestinian witness told an Italian reporter that on many roofs of the tall buildings that were hit by Israeli bombs, including UN building, there were rocket-launchers or Hamas look-outs. On 27 January, the Shin Bet released details given by Hamas captives, including the militants' use of mosques for weapon caches and military training. Militants admitted to the location of Hamas weapon storage sites, in tunnels, in the homes of activists, and in citrus groves and mosques, and told of theory instruction given in mosques as well. Following the visit of the British Army veteran Colonel Tim Collins to the ruins of one of the mosques targeted by the IDF in Rafah, he said that in his view the evidencies of the secondary explosion, that could have indicated weapon's storage in the mosque, are present.

==== Palestinian rockets in Gaza ====
According to Human Rights Watch, On 24 December 2008, a rocket struck a bedroom of a family living in the Tel al-Hawa area in southern Gaza City, critically wounding one man. The brother of this victim told after the incident no armed group came to apologize. "I was next door in my home when this all happened. When one of those responsible tried to bargain for the shrapnel, I said that if no one took responsibility I will go to the courts, so Hamas came to me privately and admitted it." On 26 December 2008, a Palestinian rocket struck north of Beit Lahiya, a house was hit killing two cousins and wounding another. The grandfather described the rocket as about one meter in length; according to Human Rights Watch examination the diameter of the pipe is 120 mm. The grandfather said the rocket was taken by Hamas policemen for investigation: "After he left, the war started and we never heard from him again. We got the compensation given to all victims of the war."

==== Rocket attacks into Israel ====
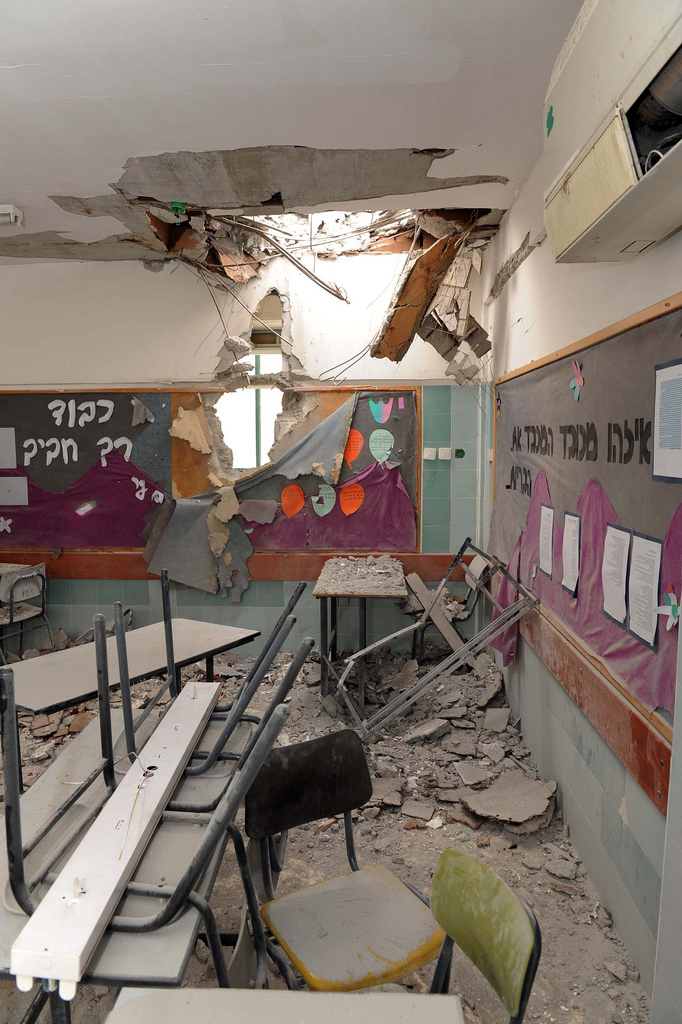
Kindergarten classroom in Beersheba hit by Grad rocket from Gaza

After the initial Israeli aerial assault, Hamas quickly dispersed both its personnel and weapons and equipment. According to Human Rights Watch rockets from Gaza were fired from populated areas, an Islamic Jihad fighter said: "the most important thing is achieving our military goals.... We stay away from the houses if we can, but that's often impossible." According to BBC, Palestinian groups had been firing "in response to Israeli massacres". The strike range of Hamas rockets had increased from 16 km (9.9 mi) to 40 km (25 mi) since early 2008 with the use of improved Qassam and factory-made rockets. Rockets reached major Israeli cities Ashdod, Beersheba and Gedera for the first time, putting one-eighth of Israel's population in rocket range. On 3 January 2009 Ma'an News Agency reported: "The Al-Qassam Brigades, military wing of Hamas, said that after a week since the start of the 'Battle of Al-Furqan [the criterion]' it has managed to fire 302 rockets, at an average of 44 rockets daily." As of 13 January 2009, Palestinian militants had launched approximately 565 rockets and 200 mortars at Israel since the beginning of the conflict, according to Israeli security sources. A source close to Hamas described the movement's use of stealth when firing: "They fired rockets in between the houses and covered the alleys with sheets so they could set the rockets up in five minutes without the planes seeing them. The moment they fired, they escaped, and they are very quick." It is reported that 102 rockets and 35 mortars were fired by Fatah, Hamas' chief rival.

Besides the rockets fired by the Qassam Brigades of Hamas, other factions claimed responsibility for rockets fired into Israel and attacks on Israeli soldiers, including Al-Aqsa Martyrs' Brigades (affiliated with Fatah), the Abu Ali Mustapha Brigades, the Quds Brigades and the Popular Resistance Councils.

Militants fired over 750 rockets and mortars from Gaza into Israel during the conflict. Bersheeba and Gedera were the farthest areas hit by rocket or mortars. The rockets also caused property damage, including damage to three schools. Senior Hamas official Mahmoud al-Zahar stated during the operation "they [Israeli forces] shelled everyone in Gaza.... They shelled children and hospitals and mosques, ... and in doing so, they gave us legitimacy to strike them in the same way."

Human Rights Watch noted in the open letter to Ismail Haniyeh that despite his Foreign Ministry stance as part of response to the Goldstone Report, Palestinian armed groups remain responsible for firing rockets indiscriminately or deliberately at Israeli civilian objects. HRW also noted that Palestinian militants put Palestinian civilians at risk of Israeli counter-attacks by launching rockets from populated areas. The UN fact finding mission stated that the firing of rockets at Israel constituted a deliberate attack against the civilian population and was in violation of international law.

After the war, the Izz ad-Din al-Qassam Brigades revealed new rockets it used during Israel's military operation and published pictures of weapons (Tandem and RPG-29 anti-armor rockets) that it could secretly smuggle to Gaza.

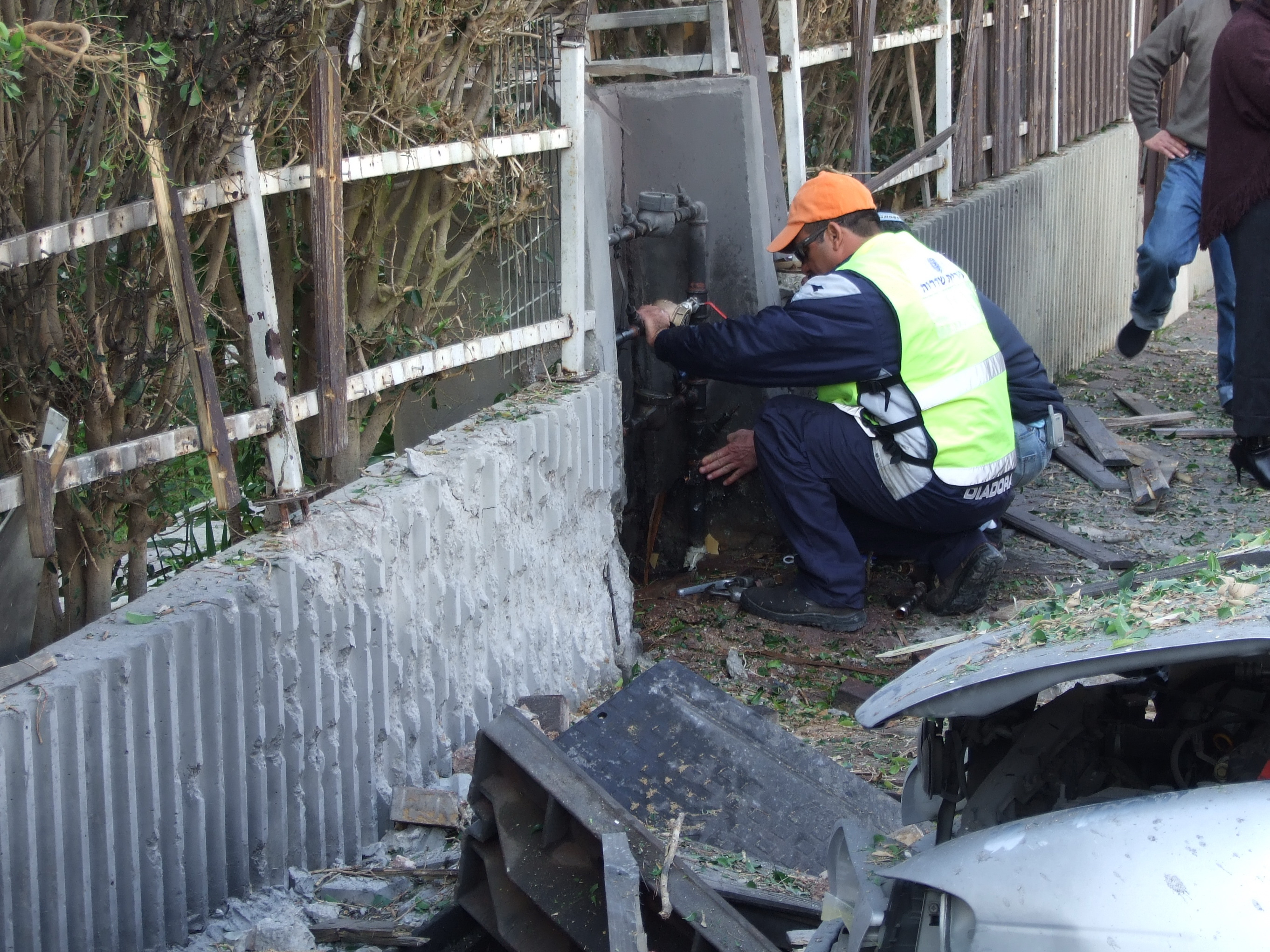
Repairs being made to water pipe after it was hit a by a rocket

Besides being hit with rockets fired from Gaza, Israel experienced other attacks along the borders with Lebanon and Syria.

== Unilateral ceasefires ==
On 17 January, Israeli officials announced a unilateral ceasefire. Israeli prime minister Ehud Olmert declared the ceasefire effective that night, at 00:00 GMT on 18 January. The ceasefire consisted of two phases: "First a ceasefire is declared. If Hamas stops firing rockets then Israel pulls its forces out of the Gaza Strip. If rocket fire resumes then the IDF goes back in, this time with the international backing gained by having tried a truce." Olmert declared that the military objectives had been met. Hamas initially "vowed to fight on", and responded that any continued Israeli presence in Gaza would be regarded as an act of war. Farzi Barhoum, a Hamas spokesman, said before the ceasefire began, "The occupier must halt his fire immediately and withdraw from our land and lift his blockade and open all crossings and we will not accept any one Zionist soldier on our land, regardless of the price that it costs." Palestinian militants resumed rocket fire into southern Israel the following Sunday morning, four of the six fired landed in or near Sderot. The Israeli military returned fire and launched an air strike against the rocket launching site in northern Gaza.

On 18 January Hamas, Islamic Jihad and other paramilitias said they would stop launching rockets into Israel for one week and demanded "the withdrawal of the enemy forces from the Gaza Strip within a week, along with the opening of all the crossings for the entry of humanitarian aid, food and other necessities for our people in the Gaza Strip". Three days later, the last Israeli troops left Gaza.

Since the unilateral ceasefires were declared on 17 January, militants have fired rockets and mortar shells from Gaza, and the IDF has launched airstrikes against Gaza.

=== Continued negotiations ===
Egyptian mediators held discussions with Israel and Hamas about extending the cease-fire by a year or more. Hamas and Fatah met to allow both to play a role in rebuilding. Israel began pressuring Egypt to do more to stop weapons smuggling into Gaza, the halting of which is one of Israel's central demands in extending a cease-fire. On 27 January 2009, Foreign Minister of Egypt Ahmed Aboul Gheit discouraged Britain, France and Germany from sending warships to patrol the waters off Gaza, which the three European nations felt could help halt seaborne smuggling. Gheit said such efforts would harm Europe's relations with the Arab world. Egypt also opposed proposals for European troops to be stationed on the border between Gaza and Egypt to monitor smuggling tunnels.

Israel, along with many Western and some Arab countries, wanted international aid groups to control aid from donations around the world, so that Hamas would not receive credit for the rebuilding. To speed up reconstruction, Hamas agreed that it would not insist on collecting reconstruction money itself and would allow donated money to flow through different avenues based on the various alliances, although Hamas ultimately expected to administer the aid. But advisors to senior Hamas political leader Ismail Haniyeh said Israel's willingness to open the border for humanitarian aid only was unacceptable, as Hamas would need much more to rebuild its economy and provide relief for citizens. Haniyeh aides said the cease-fire is contingent on a full border opening.

Shortly after becoming President of the United States, Barack Obama directed newly appointed special envoy to the Middle East George J. Mitchell to visit Israel, the West Bank, Egypt, Jordan, Turkey and Saudi Arabia for peace talks. Mitchell began his meetings in Cairo on 27 January 2009, and Obama said his visit was part of the President's campaign promise to listen to both sides of the Israeli–Palestinian conflict and work toward a Middle East peace deal. Mitchell did not plan to talk to Hamas, but instead focus on talks with the more moderate Palestinian Authority. A spokesman for Haniyeh said he respected Mitchell, but was disappointed with the envoy's decision not to hold discussions with Hamas.

Ehud Olmert stated that Israel would not agree to a long term truce or lift the blockade on Gaza without the freeing of Gilad Shalit, an IDF soldier held captive in Gaza since June 2006. Hamas demanded that Israel release 1,400 Palestinian prisoners in exchange for Shalit and such negotiations be kept separate from ceasefire negotiations.

== Casualties ==
Human rights organizations and the United States Department of State estimated Palestinian casualties of the Gaza War (2008–2009) as "1,400 Palestinians killed, including more than 1,000 civilians", though Israel disagreed. The total Israeli casualties were 13, including three non-combatants and 10 combatants (four Israeli soldiers were killed in friendly fire incidents).

			PCHR	B'Tselem	Mezan	IDF	GHM
Total (non-combatants + combatants)			1,417	1,391	1,409	1,166	1,440 (Note: Does not include indirect deaths (e.g. Palestinians who died due to denial of healthcare resulting from the war).)
Non-combatants	Total unarmed civilians and police		1181	1025	1,172		
Non-combatants	Police not participating in hostilities		255 (Note: PCHR deems the 255 police officers killed in Israel's surprise attack as not taking part in hostilities, therefore non-combatants.)	248 (Note: Police totaling 248 were killed inside police stations and not known to be taking part in combat. B'Tselem categorizes any police officer killed in combat under "combatants".)			
Non-combatants	Unarmed civilians	Total unarmed civilians	926	777		295	
Non-combatants	Unarmed civilians	Women	116	110	111	49	114
Non-combatants	Unarmed civilians	Children	313	344	342	89	431
Combatants			236	350	237 (Note: Thirteen of the combatants were children.)	709 (Note: The IDF considers police officers to be combatants.)	
Unknown				32			
% combatants			17%	25%	17%	61%	
Name of every casualty published?			Yes	Yes	Yes	No	Yes
Notes							

Al Mezan Centre for Human Rights said in January 2009, that 1,268 people were killed, among them 288 children and 103 women, and 85% of those killed were not combatants. The United States Department of State estimated "1,400 Palestinians killed, including more than 1,000 civilians."

Hamas initially claimed only 48 of its fighters had been killed. This led to domestic criticism from Palestinians who lamented that ordinary civilians had suffered instead of armed fighters, leading Hamas to then later state that it too had suffered losses. Gazan Interior Minister Fathi Hamad stated that between 200 and 300 Hamas fighters had been killed. Both Richard Goldstone and Norman Finkelstein argued that Hamas "may have reason to inflate" the number of militants killed.

During the war, three Israeli civilians were killed by rocket attacks. A total of 10 Israeli soldiers were killed in the war, of whom six were killed by enemy action and four were killed by friendly fire.

=== Civilians versus combatants ===
In any conflict, the ratio of combatant and civilian deaths is a highly sensitive topic. During the fighting in the Gaza War, one source for the number of Palestinian casualties was Ministry of Health in Gaza (GHM), which is run by Hamas. After the war, the GHM, PCHR, and Al-Mezan all provided a list of casualties for every single person killed, including their name, age, gender, address, occupation and the place and date of death. PCHR and Mezan found less than 17% of those killed were combatants. The Israeli organization B'Tselem also published detailed casualty lists on its website, including the names, age, gender of every single victim and the circumstances in which they were killed (where known), and found 25% of those killed were combatants. The Israeli government, who claimed 61% of those killed were combatants, did not publish a list of victims.

The ICRC used Gaza Health Ministry's figures, but at a later stage it made its own assessment. Because Israel allowed very few international workers and journalists in Gaza during much of the conflict, it has been difficult to verify the figures independently.

In The Jerusalem Post, Israeli-Arab journalist Khaled Abu Toameh suggested that killed fighters in civilian clothes led to the over-counting of civilian casualties and under-counting Hamas military casualties, as Palestinian casualties arrived at hospitals without weapons or any other signs revealing they were fighters.

Al-Mezan defined "combatant" as anyone belonging to either or both of the two categories:

- anyone actively participating in minor or major hostilities
- anyone affiliated with an armed group that participates in hostilities in continuous combat function, even if not engaged in hostilities at the time in which they were targeted

Al-Mezan did not regard as "combatants" those who were members of civilian organizations (such as Hamas-affiliated political parties) and were not known to be involved in armed hostilities. In some cases, Al-Mezan found members of civilian organization who took part in hositilities and included them in the "combatant" count.

B'Tselem wrote that its fatalities classification was based on the guidelines of the International Committee of the Red Cross (ICRC) published in June 2009. The PCHR civilian count includes Hamas members killed in what the PCHR assessed were non-combat situations. B'Tselem presumed children (under 18) to be civilians unless there was evidence of the child taking part in hostilities. Israeli professor Yael Stein criticized B'Tselem arguing that absence of evidence is not evidence of absence.

==== Gazan police ====
During the conflict Israel deliberately targeted police facilities in Gaza, including classrooms for policing students, and a police cadet graduation ceremony. Many of these attacks occurred during the first minutes of the operations resulting in the deaths of 99 policemen and nine other members of the public. The attacks on Police during the first day of the operation included the bombing of a police cadet graduation ceremony, killing scores of police cadets along with family members who had come to attend the celebration. Police cadets killed in the incident included traffic police and musicians in the police orchestra. The UN fact finding mission established that approximately 240 Gaza policemen were killed by Israeli forces during the course of the conflict constituting over one sixth of the total Palestinian casualties. According to Ayman al-Batniji, spokesperson for the Palestinian Police Force in Gaza, almost 251 policemen were killed within the first few hours of the attack which also left more than 700 others injured, including those who could never return to work due to losing their legs and other limbs.

===== Legality =====
The UN Fact Finding Mission analysed the police institutions in Gaza from the time Hamas gained control. They concluded that the Gaza police were a civilian law-enforcement agency and that Israel's blanket targeting of the Gaza police was therefore a violation of international humanitarian law.

Human Rights Watch stated that police are presumptively civilians but on a specific case-by-case basis can be considered valid targets if formally incorporated into the armed forces of a party to a conflict or directly participate in the hostilities. They stressed that blanket decisions must not be made about police being legitimate targets and that a decision that police and police stations are legitimate military targets depends on whether those police play a role in fighting against Israel, or whether a particular police station is used to store weapons or for some other military purpose. B'Tselem also states that police officers are presumed to be civilians and likely not legitimate objects of attack under international humanitarian law.

=== IDF casualty figures ===
On 25 March 2009 the IDF announced that 1,370 Palestinians had been killed, but on 26 March, it abruptly changed the total casualties to 1,166. Israeli organization PCATI said this was evidence of the IDF manipulating data.

The Israeli Orient Research Group reported that 78 of the 89 killed during this first IAF strike were terror operatives, many of them belonging to the militant group, al-Qassam Brigades. The Jerusalem Centre for Public Affairs further reported that 286 of the 343 police officers killed during the offensive were members of terror organizations and that another 27 fighters belonged to units undergoing infantry training. It noted that the security apparatuses participated in terror activity and that the Hamas leadership presented these organizations as at the forefront of the jihad for liberating all of Palestine.

The IDF made clear that it regards police under the control of Hamas in Gaza to be equivalent to the enemies armed fighters, including them in the militant's count. A government paper published pictures of four men that were killed during the military operations that they claim were downloaded from Palestinian websites. The men are identified in the different pictures as both policemen and members of al-Qassam Brigades. Israeli Intelligence and Terrorism Information Center (ITIC) alleged that the distinction between the internal security forces and Hamas military wing is not sharply defined and cites Gaza police officials who said that police were instructed to fight the enemy in case of an invasion into the Gaza Strip. Many security force members were reported to "moonlight" with the militant group, Izzidin al-Qassam Brigades.

=== Israeli casualties ===
During the conflict, rockets fired by Palestinian groups killed 3 Israelis and wounded 182 people, with another 584 suffering from shock and anxiety. The UN fact finding mission stated that this constituted a deliberate attack against the civilian population and was unjustifiable in international law.

== Aftermath ==
Israel declared it was victorious militarily, although some expressed concern at the mounting war crime investigations. The international community continued to isolate Hamas (except for Iran and Syria), because it rejected the Quartet demands to recognize Israel, accept the Oslo accords peace initiative and abandon violence in exchange for international recognition as representatives of the Palestinian people. Hamas faced significant criticism in Gaza Strip for its poor military performance. A satirical theatrical play called "The Women of Gaza and the Patience of Job" was performed nightly in Gaza city; the play parodied Hamas militants as making far-fetched claims like the ability to hit Tel Aviv with crude rockets. In the months following the war, Hamas suspended its use of rockets and shifted focus to winning support at home and abroad through cultural initiatives and public relations, with the aim to build a "cultural resistance". Hamas officials stated that "The current situation required a stoppage of rockets. After the war, the fighters needed a break and the people needed a break."

The war was an Israeli tactical victory and a significant tactical defeat for Hamas. Al-Qassam Brigades reported in "The outcome of al-Qassam operations during the Battle of al-Furqan" they killed 102 Israeli soldiers. On 19 January 2009, a spokesperson for the group said on al-Arabiya "Israel lost 'at least 80 soldiers' in the fighting" and said about Hamas losses "only 48 fighters slain in Israel war". The Gazan Interior Minister revised Hamas' loss number up to between 200 and 300 and stated the non-Hamas security forces to be 150, bringing the total Gazan loss number to be between 350 and 450, a number similar to the United States Department of State which estimated less than 400 combatants, as well as mentioning 250 police officers "from [itself] and other factions", but not identifying them as fighters. The strictest methodology for determining "combatant" from Al-Mezan estimated 237. These numbers fell short of the IDF's 709 "terror operatives", counting the 250 police officers as under the control of Hamas and thus to be equivalent to its armed fighters. According to United Nations report of the Independent International Fact-Finding Mission of Human Rights Council, which was on General Assembly's agenda on 29 October 2009: "The large discrepancy in the data confirms the Mission's observations below in the report about the reliability of the information about the Gaza military operations posted on websites of al-Qassam and other Palestinian armed groups."

Several senior Hamas military commanders and politburo members were killed, as well as approximately 50 explosives experts. Hamas experienced "widespread desertion" in the face of the Israeli advance. Hamas also lost a very large amount of weaponry and equipment; key storage facilities were discovered under mosques and public buildings. A former Shin Bet deputy director who co-authored a report on the war noted, "Hamas had planned to stand and fight, but the Iz al-Qassam Brigades proved unequal to the task ... and consequently they failed to match the public image Hamas has tried so hard to present of stalwart, proficient Islamic warriors."

In addition, the Israeli operation greatly curtailed years of Hamas rocket fire, returning a sense of normalcy to Southern Israel. In the year before the war, Hamas had fired over 3,300 rockets at Israel's Gaza periphery towns. That number dropped to less than 300 in the ten months following the conflict.

Defense analyst David Eshel stated, "The success of Operation Cast Lead in the densely populated Gaza Strip shows that an industrial military that coordinates operations among land, air and sea units, makes effective use of advanced technology, and shares intelligence and leads from the front can decisively defeat an asymmetrical enemy." He further noted, "Israel used a variety of tactics to outflank and defeat Hamas in its own territory. These included long-term planning, meticulous intelligence-gathering, deception and disinformation." As a result of its poor performance, Hamas relieved at least two brigade commanders on Iranian advice, and reportedly stripped 100 fighters of their membership. The organization decided to initiate a thorough investigation of the conduct of its fighters during the operation. Hamas' leadership modified its tactical doctrine. The Qassam Brigades intensified military training at its various training camps and military academy in the Nuseirat refugee camp. The new training was thought to be more offensive, with a focus on hitting the rear of an IDF force. Hezbollah operatives were suspected of involvement in the program. In contrast to the pre-war period, when Hamas openly displayed its capabilities, the nature of the program was kept classified.

The Israeli army said it destroyed about 80% of the tunnels between Gaza and Egypt that were being used to bring in weapons and rocket components. Residents in Rafah said they cleared away debris and discovered that many of the tunnels were intact, though they acknowledged the destruction of many.

== Propaganda and psychological warfare ==
=== Hamas ===
Before and during the conflict, Hamas' senior representatives released a number of statements designed to avert Israeli decision-makers from launching any military operation in Gaza and to cause demoralization among Israelis. Before the end of the pre-conflict ceasefire, Hamas boasted that it had countless surprises awaiting Israeli troops, should they advance. Hamas representatives threatened on several occasions to abduct Israeli soldiers, and during the ground invasion tried to spread rumors that it actually had captured or killed more Israeli soldiers.

On a video broadcast on Al-Aqsa TV on 10 January showing the names of Israeli towns hit by rockets, it was implied Tel-Aviv is the next target and that 'all options are open'. Also, Hamas sent messages in Hebrew to Israeli citizens' mobile phones warning: "Rockets on all cities, shelters will not protect you."

Hamas instrumentalized the Israeli soldier Gilad Shalit as a form of psychological weapon, declaring that he had been wounded by Israeli fire, later announcing that his condition was no longer of interest to them.

According to IDF spokesman, Hamas' ruses in the battlefield included booby traps throughout Gaza's neighborhoods, such as mannequins placed at apartment entrances and rigged to explode when the soldiers approach.

Arab television stations reported Hamas-provided statistics for Israeli casualties on the assumption that Israel is distorting its own figures of soldiers killed and wounded.

A study by the Center for Strategic and International Studies notes that Hamas propaganda both rejected Hamas responsibility for the fighting and used it to attack the Palestinian Authority.

Dr. Tal Pavel from Israeli think-tank International Policy Institute for Counter-Terrorism (ICT) said that Hamas uses its Web sites to make comparisons between Israel and Nazi Germany, portraying Israel as a destructive, oppressive regime afraid of Hamas rockets raining on Tel Aviv.

=== Israel ===
The day before the beginning of the offensive on 27 December the IDF pulled troops back from the border and used its radio channels to broadcast talk of a "lull" to achieve a disinformation coup to lure Hamas fighters out of hiding.

A broadcaster in Islamic Jihad's Voice of Jerusalem radio station in Gaza City reported that IDF have been breaking into his station signal "least once an hour" during conflict intensification to broadcast messages to Gaza's population that their problems were due to Hamas. The Israelis also dropped leaflets with similar messages and contact info to report about the whereabouts of militant leaders and weapons caches. The leaflets also said, "The Israeli army will respond if the rocket fire continues." In war zones, leaflets warned local residents that they had to flee. It also warned residents that their homes would be targeted if they were located in an area of possible target. Dr. Yaniv Levitan of the University of Haifa said that the aim of the flyers was not to demoralize the civil population, but to implant recognition in hearts and minds that Hamas has failed, that there is an option of choosing another path.

IDF spokespersons often reported that scores of demoralized Hamas fighters had been observed deserting. According to Ephraim Kam, deputy head of the Institute of National Security Studies at Tel Aviv University, the claim could not be confirmed but it strengthened the Israeli population's will to continue and undermined the confidence of Hamas in Gaza.

There was a mistrust of phone calls warning messages to people that they have "just minutes to evacuate before they bomb the house". According to a human rights lawyer at the Palestinian Center for Human Rights (PCHR), despite the hundreds of phone calls to families warning their house is about to be blown up, only 37 were destroyed, presumably as of 3 January date.

== War crimes by Israel ==
=== Collective punishment ===
The United Nations Fact Finding Mission on the Gaza Conflict found that Israel, at least in part, targeted the people of Gaza as a whole. The Mission gave its opinion that "the operations were in furtherance of an overall policy aimed at punishing the Gaza population for its resilience and for its apparent support for Hamas, and possibly with the intent of forcing a change in such support." Judge Goldstone later at least partially resiled from this conclusion. Historian Avi Shlaim wrote that "The indifference to the fate of the civilian population is difficult to understand unless it was motivated by a punitive streak."

=== Disproportionate force ===
Israel was widely criticized by human rights groups for using heavy firepower and causing hundreds of civilian casualties. A group of soldiers who took part in the conflict echoed the criticism through both the Israeli NGO Breaking the Silence and a special report by Israeli filmmaker Nurit Kedar that was shown on Britain's Channel 4 in January 2011. Israel was accused of having a deliberate policy of disproportionate force aimed at the civilian population. Israel has said that operational orders emphasized proportionality and humanity while the importance of minimising harm to civilians was made clear to soldiers. Historian Avi Shlaim wrote that "Operation Cast Lead was not a war in the usual sense of the word but a one-sided massacre. For twenty-two days the IDF shot, shelled, and bombed Hamas targets and at the same time rained death and destruction on the defenseless population of Gaza. Statistics tell only part of the grim story. Israel had 13 dead; the Gazans had 1,417 dead, including 313 children, and more than 5,500 wounded. According to one estimate, 83 percent of the casualties were civilians." (Note: Avi Shlaim 2014, The Iron Wall: Israel and the Arab World (Updated and Expanded). Quotation: "Operation Cast Lead was not a war in the usual sense of the word but a one-sided massacre. For twenty-two days the IDF shot, shelled, and bombed Hamas targets and at the same time rained death and destruction on the defenseless population of Gaza. Statistics tell only part of the grim story. Israel had 13 dead; the Gazans had 1,417 dead, including 313 children, and more than 5,500 wounded. According to one estimate, 83 percent of the casualties were civilians. Along with the heavy civilian death toll, there were serious economic, industrial, and medical consequences. Gaza lost nearly $2 billion in assets. Four thousand homes were totally demolished and another 20,000 were damaged. The IDF destroyed 600–700 factories, small industries, workshops, and business enterprises, 24 mosques, and 31 security compounds. Eight hospitals, 26 primary health care clinics, and over 50 United Nations facilities sustained damage during the war. Overall, the savage assault drove Gaza to the brink of a humanitarian catastrophe.")

=== IDF use of human shields ===
On 24 March, a report from the UN team responsible for the protection of children in war zones was released: it found "hundreds" of violations of the rights of children and accused Israeli soldiers of using children as human shields, bulldozing a home with a woman and child still inside, and shelling a building they had ordered civilians into a day earlier. One case involved using an 11-year-old boy as a human shield, by forcing him to enter suspected buildings first and also inspect bags. The report also mentioned the boy was used as a shield when Israeli soldiers came under fire. The Guardian has also received testimony from three Palestinian brothers aged 14, 15, and 16, who all claimed to have been used as human shields.

The UK newspaper The Guardian conducted an investigation of its own, which, according to the paper, uncovered evidence of war crimes including the use of Palestinian children as human shields. An Israeli military court later convicted two Israeli soldiers of using human shields, which was outlawed by the Israeli Supreme court in 2005.

The UN fact-finding mission investigated four incidents in which Palestinian civilians were coerced, blindfolded, handcuffed and at gunpoint to enter houses ahead of Israeli soldiers during military operations. The mission confirmed the continued use of this practice with published testimonies of Israeli soldiers who had taken part in the military operations. The mission concluded that these practices amounted to using civilians as human shields in breach of international law. Some civilians were also questioned under threat of death or injury to extract information about Palestinian combatants and tunnels, constituting a further violation of international humanitarian law.

=== White phosphorus ===
From 5 January, reports emerged of use by Israel of white phosphorus during the offensive, which was initially denied by Israel. There were numerous reports of its use by the IDF during the conflict. On 12 January, it was reported that more than 50 phosphorus burns victims were in Nasser Hospital. On 16 January the UNRWA headquarters was hit with phosphorus munitions. As a result of the hit, the compound was set ablaze. On completion of the three-day Israeli withdrawal (21 January) an Israeli military spokeswoman said that shells containing phosphorus had been used in Gaza but said that they were used legally as a method to provide a smokescreen. The IDF reiterated their position on 13 January saying that it used weapons "in compliance with international law, while strictly observing that they be used according to the type of combat and its characteristics". On 25 March 2009, the United States-based human rights organization Human Rights Watch published a 71-page report titled "Rain of Fire, Israel's Unlawful Use of White Phosphorus in Gaza" and said that Israel's usage of the weapon was illegal. Donatella Rovera, Amnesty's researcher on Israel and the Occupied Palestinian Territories said that such extensive use of this weapon in Gaza's densely populated residential neighbourhoods is inherently indiscriminate. "Its repeated use in this manner, despite evidence of its indiscriminate effects and its toll on civilians, is a war crime", she said. The Goldstone report accepted that white phosphorus is not illegal under international law but did find that the Israelis were "systematically reckless in determining its use in built-up areas". It also called for serious consideration to be given to the banning of its use as an obscurant.

Al Jazeera video. Burning Israeli white phosphorus clusters in the streets of Gaza on 11 January 2009. Videos by Al Jazeera of the 2008–2009 Gaza War

After watching footage of Israeli troop deployments on television, a British soldier who completed numerous combat tours in Iraq and Afghanistan with the Intelligence Corps defended the Israeli Army's use of white phosphorus. The soldier noted, "White phosphorus is used because it provides an instant smokescreen, other munitions can provide a smokescreen but the effect is not instant. Faced with overwhelming enemy fire and wounded comrades, every commander would choose to screen his men instantly, to do otherwise would be negligent."

Colonel Lane, a military expert testifying in front of the fact-finding mission in July 2009, told that white phosphorus is used for smoke generation to hide from the enemy. He stated, "The quality of smoke produced by white phosphorus is superb; if you want real smoke for real coverage, white phosphorus will give it to you."

Professor Newton, expert in laws of armed conflict testifying in front of the committee, said that in an urban area, where potential perils are snipers, explosive devices and trip wires, one effective way to mask forces' movement is by white phosphorus. In certain cases, he added, such choice of means would be less harmful for civilian population than other munitions, provided that the use of white phosphorus withstands the proportionality test. In discussing the principle of proportionality he said that the legality of using white phosphorus in an urban setting could only be decided on a case-by-case basis taking into account "the precise circumstances of its use, not in general, generically, but based on that target, at that time". He stressed that the humanitarian implications were vital in this assessment giving the example that using white phosphorus on a school yard would have different implications to its use on another area. He also said that in his view white phosphorus munition is neither chemical nor incendiary weapon and is not intended to cause damage. He said its use was not prohibited by the Chemical Weapons Convention.

An article by Mark Cantora examining the legal implications of the use of white phosphorus munitions by the IDF, published in 2010 in the Gonzaga Journal of International Law, argues that Israel's use of white phosphorus in Gaza was technically legal under existing international humanitarian laws and "Therefore, it is imperative for the international community to convene a White Phosphorus Convention Conference in order to address these issues and fill this substantial gap in international humanitarian law."

=== Dense inert metal explosives (DIME) ===
Dense inert metal explosive (DIME) is a type of bomb developed to minimize collateral damage. Casualties show unusual injuries. A military expert working for Human Rights Watch said judging by the nature of the wounds and descriptions given by Gazans made it seem likely that Israel used DIME weapons. A Norwegian doctor who worked at Gaza's Shifa Hospital said that pressure waves generated by missile hits are likely the cause and produced by DIME weapons. Another Norwegian doctor said they had "clear evidence that the Israelis are using a new type of very high explosive weapons which are called Dense Inert Metal Explosive".

Colonel Lane, military expert testifying in front of the fact-finding mission in July 2009, told the committee that through his studies, no actual proof was found that DIME rounds were used, but tungsten, iron, and sulfur were found in samples analyzed in a forensic lab. He is of the view that some weapons systems used in the conflict had some sort of DIME component to reduce the effect on the ground. Colonel Lane explained that the idea behind a Focused Lethality Munition (FLM), which is an example of a DIME munition, is that the fragments produced stay within a safety radius of about 6 meters, so anybody outside that radius is safe, while those within the area of dispersal will be affected severely. He commented on the documentations where medics described unusual amputations saying that he was no medical expert, but the use of a metal like tungsten and cobalt at short distances would likely have that effect.

The Goldstone Report wrote that the Mission found that the allegations that DIME weapons were used by Israeli armed forces required further clarification and they were unable to ascertain their usage, though it received reports from Palestinian and foreign doctors who had operated in Gaza during the military operations of a high percentage of patients with injuries compatible with their impact. It stated that the "focused lethality" reportedly pursued in DIME weapons could be seen as enhancing compliance with the principle of distinction between civilian and military objects. The report added that as it currently stands, DIME weapons and weapons armed with heavy metal are not prohibited under international law, but do raise specific health concerns.

An Amnesty International report called on Israel to confirm or deny its use of DIME in order to facilitate the treatment of those injured in the conflict. After reports of similar cases in 2006, the IDF had denied the use of DIME weapons.

=== Accusations of misconduct by IDF soldiers ===
Testimonies from Israeli soldiers allegedly admitting indiscriminate killings of civilians, as well as vandalizing homes, were reported in March 2009. Soon after the publication of the testimonies, reports implying that the testimonies were based on hearsay and not on the firsthand experience started to circulate. At the same time, another kind of evidence was collected from several soldiers who took part in the fighting, that rebutted claims of immoral conduct on the military's part during Gaza War. Following investigations, the IDF issued an official report, concluding that alleged cases of deliberate shooting at civilians did not take place. Nine Israeli rights groups reacting to the closure of the investigation issued a joint statement calling for an "independent nonpartisan investigative body to be established to look into all Israeli army activity" in Gaza.

In July 2009, the Israeli NGO Breaking the Silence published testimony from 26 soldiers (two junior officers and the rest enlisted personnel) who took part in the Gaza assault, claiming that the IDF used Gazans as human shields, improperly fired incendiary white phosphorus shells over civilian areas and used overwhelming firepower that caused needless deaths and destruction. The report did not represent a cross-section of the army, but rather they were troops who had approached the group or were reached through acquaintances of NGO members. The accusations were made by anonymous people who claimed that they were reserves soldiers and whose faces had been blurred in the filmed talks. An Israeli military spokesperson dismissed the testimonies as anonymous hearsay and questioned why Breaking the Silence had not handed over its findings before the media had been informed. The Israeli military said some allegations of misconduct had turned out to be second or third-hand accounts and the result of recycled rumours. Breaking the Silence state that their methodology includes the verification of all information by cross-referencing the testimonies it collects and that published material has been confirmed by a number of testimonies, from several different points of view. A representative stated "the personal details of the soldiers quoted in the collection, and the exact location of the incidents described in the testimonies, would readily be made available to any official and independent investigation of the events, as long as the identity of the testifiers did not become public." A soldier who described using Gazans as human shields told in an interview to Haaretz that he had not seen Palestinians being used as human shields but had been told by his commanders that this occurred.

In response to the report, a dozen English-speaking reservists who served in Gaza delivered signed, on-camera counter-testimonies via the SoldiersSpeakOut group, about Hamas' "use of Gazans as human shields and the measures the IDF took to protect Arab civilians". The special report by Israeli filmmaker Nurit Kedar shown on Channel 4 detailed similar allegations by former IDF soldiers that included vandalism and misconduct by Israeli troops.

Colonel Richard Kemp, former commander of British forces in Afghanistan, in his address to the UNHRC asserted that during the conflict, the Israel Defense Forces "did more to safeguard the rights of civilians in a combat zone than any other army in the history of warfare" and that Palestinian civilian casualties were a consequence of Hamas' way of fighting, which involved using human shields as a matter of policy, and deliberate attempts to sacrifice their own civilians. He added that Israel took extraordinary measures to give Gaza civilians notice of targeted areas and aborted potentially effective missions in order to prevent civilian casualties.

==== Prosecutions ====
The first Israeli soldier to be prosecuted for actions committed during the war was a Givati Brigade soldier who stole a Visa credit card from a Palestinian home and used it to withdraw NIS 1,600 ($405). He was arrested and tried before the Southern Command Military Court on charges of looting, credit card fraud, and indecent conduct. He was found guilty and sentenced to seven and a half months in military prison.

In a report submitted to the UN in January 2010, the IDF stated that two senior officers were disciplined for authorizing an artillery attack in violation of rules against their near populated areas. Several artillery shells hit the UNRWA compound in Tel al-Hawa. During the attack on 15 January 2009, the compound was set ablaze by white phosphorus shells. The officers involved were identified as Gaza Division Commander Brigadier-General Eyal Eisenberg and Givati Brigade Commander Colonel Ilan Malka. An IDF internal investigation concluded that the firing of the shells violated the IDF orders limiting the use of artillery fire near populated areas and endangered human life. IDF sources added later that the shells had been fired to create cover to assist in the extrication of IDF troops, some of whom were wounded, from an area where Hamas held a superior position. An Israeli Government spokesman stated that in this particular case they had found no evidence of criminal wrongdoing and so had not referred the case to criminal investigation.

In October 2010, Colonel Ilan Malka was interrogated by Israeli military police over the Zeitoun killings, and a criminal investigation was opened. Malka was suspected of authorizing an airstrike on a building that left numerous members of the Samouni family dead. His promotion to the rank of brigadier-general was suspended due to the investigation. Malka told investigators that he was unaware of the presence of civilians. He was eventually reprimanded over the incident, but it was decided not to indict him. No other charges were brought over this incident. The IDF denied that they were targeting civilians. Residents reported that while Hamas members had launched rockets from more than a mile away from the residents, there was "no active Hamas resistance in the immediate vicinity". The Palestinian Center for Human Rights called the result "disgraceful" and Btselem stated the need for an external investigator to look into IDF actions during Cast Lead.

In June 2010, Chief Advocate General Avichai Mandelblit summoned a recently discharged Givati Brigade sniper for a special hearing. The soldier was suspected of opening fire on Palestinian civilians when a group of 30 Palestinians that included women and children waving a white flag, approached an IDF position. The incident, which occurred on 4 January 2009, resulted in the death of a non-combatant. Mandelblit decided to indict the soldier on a charge of manslaughter, despite contradictory testimony and the fact that IDF investigators could not confirm that the soldier was responsible for the death.

In July 2010, the officer who authorized the airstrike on the Ibrahim al-Maqadna Mosque was subjected to disciplinary action, as shrapnel caused "unintentional injuries" to civilians inside. The IDF said that the officer "failed to exercise appropriate judgement", and that he would not be allowed to serve in similar positions of command in the future. Another Israeli officer was also reprimanded for allowing a Palestinian man to enter a building to persuade Hamas militants sheltering inside to leave.

In November 2010, two Givati Brigade Staff Sergeants were convicted by the Southern Command Military Court of using a Palestinian boy as a human shield. The soldiers had been accused of forcing nine-year-old Majed R. at gunpoint to open bags suspected of containing bombs in the Tel al-Hawa neighborhood. Both soldiers were demoted one rank and given three-month suspended sentences.

According to the U.S. State Department's 2010 Human Rights Report, the Military Advocate General investigated over 150 wartime incidents, including those mentioned in the Goldstone Report. As of July, the Military Advocate General launched 47 criminal investigations into the conduct of IDF personnel, and completed a significant number of those.

On 1 April 2011, Judge Richard Goldstone, the lead author of the UN report on the conflict, published a piece in The Washington Post titled 'Reconsidering the Goldstone Report on Israel and war crimes'. Goldstone noted that the subsequent investigations conducted by Israel "indicate that civilians were not intentionally targeted as a matter of policy" while "the crimes allegedly committed by Hamas were intentional goes without saying." He further expressed regret "that our fact-finding mission did not have such evidence explaining the circumstances in which we said civilians in Gaza were targeted, because it probably would have influenced our findings about intentionality and war crimes." The other principal authors of the UN report, Hina Jilani, Christine Chinkin and Desmond Travers, have rejected Goldstone's reassessment arguing that there is "no justification for any demand or expectation for reconsideration of the report as nothing of substance has appeared that would in any way change the context, findings or conclusions of that report with respect to any of the parties to the Gaza conflict".

=== Intent to commit war crimes ===
Professor Jerome Slater argues that in the months preceding the war, several top Israeli officials had made statements that can be construed as intentions to violate the laws of war. Prime Minister Ehud Olmert had said "if there is shooting at the residents of the south, there will be a harsh Israeli response that is disproportionate." This remark was criticized by Richard Falk as a "blatant repudiation of" proportionality in International Humanitarian Law. In October 2008, Israeli general Gadi Eisenkot had said that Israel "will wield disproportionate power against every village from which shots are fired on Israel, and cause immense damage and destruction. ... From our perspective, these are military bases."

== War crimes by Palestinians ==
=== Civilians as human shields ===
The Israel-based Intelligence and Terrorism Information Center charged Hamas with methodically building its military infrastructure in the heart of population centers. According to the study, Hamas not only hides among the population, but has made a main component of its combat strategy "channeling" the army into the densely populated areas to fight. ITIC also alleged that Israeli Air Force videos showed terrorists using groups of children as cover to escape from combat areas and joining groups of children.

Amnesty International's investigation of these claims found no evidence that Hamas or any other Palestinian militant group had 'directed the movement of civilians to shield military objectives from attacks.' Rather, their investigation did find that Israeli soldiers had, on multiple occasions, forced Palestinian civilians, including children, to serve as human shields. Amnesty International made multiple requests for Israeli authorities to provide information to substantiate their allegations about the use of Gaza’s civilians by Hamas, but received no response.

On 6 January 2009, Israeli forces fired shells near a UN school in the Jebaliya refugee camp in Northern Gaza, killing at least 30 people. At the time, the school was sheltering hundreds of Palestinians who had been displaced by the conflict. Israel's military said the shelling was in response to mortar fire from within the school and asserted that Hamas were using civilians as cover. They stated that the dead near the school included Hamas members of a rocket launching cell. Two residents of the area told reporters that they had seen a group of about four militants firing mortar shells from a street near the school and confirmed that two of them who had been killed in the bombing were known to be low-level Hamas militants.

Human Rights Watch (HRW) recounted an incident that occurred on 29 December in the Rafah refugee camp. A group of armed Palestinian fighters had gathered near the home of Ziad al-Absi and his family at around 10:30pm and began firing machine guns at Israeli helicopters flying over the area. al-Absi told HRW, "I and the neighbors argued with the militants, told them this is a populated area and this will put us into peril". The fighters initially refused to leave, but eventually did after their commander ordered them to do so. Two hours after the fighters had left, at around 1:00am, Israeli helicopters returned and fired two missiles, one of which stuck the al-Absi home, killing their three sons, ages 3–13, and injuring their two daughters. The children's mother was also injured and sent to intensive care. According to al-Absi, in the two hours before the strike on his house, there had been no other armed activity in the area.

The Goldstone report found indications that Palestinian armed groups launched rockets from urban areas. The Mission was not able to obtain any direct evidence of specific intent of shielding the rocket launchers from counterstrokes by the Israeli armed forces. From a legal perspective, the report said that the launching of attacks close to civilian buildings would have unnecessarily exposed the civilian population of Gaza and violated the customary rules of international humanitarian law and the right to life of the endangered civilians.

The Goldstone report concluded that there was evidence of the presence of Palestinian armed groups in residential areas. The report noted that because of the densely populated nature of the northern half of the Gaza strip, once the Israeli forces gained control of the outlying areas in the first few days of the ground invasion, most, if not all, locations still accessible to the Palestinian militants would have been in urban areas. It would be difficult to avoid mixing with the civilian population in the small and overcrowded Gaza Strip. The report concluded that the Israeli Government had not produced any evidence to support its allegation that Palestinian combatants "mingle routinely with civilians in order to cover their movements".

Ehud Ya'ari alleged that during the Gaza War, Hamas invested great effort in preventing civilians from leaving neighborhoods that were in the line of fire and letting them flee to the south of the Strip.

=== Combatant use of civilian clothes ===
A New York Times journalist asserted that Hamas militants were fighting in civilian clothes. Some NGO reports suggested that in general members of Palestinian armed groups did not wear military uniforms and mixed with the civilian population.

The UN Fact Finding Mission (Goldstone Mission), however, concluded in its report: "While reports reviewed by the Mission credibly indicate that members of Palestinian armed groups were not always dressed in a way that distinguished them from civilians, the Mission found no evidence that Palestinian combatants mingled with the civilian population with the intention of shielding themselves from attack."

=== Military use of medical facilities and uniforms ===
An IDF investigation concluded that Hamas forced the Red Crescent to hand over medic and nurse uniforms for its operatives and commandeered ambulances for fighters transportation during the War. Palestinian civilians living in Gaza detailed Hamas' attempts to hijack ambulances and the wearing of paramedic uniforms by Hamas fighters. An ambulance driver registered with and trained by the Palestinian Red Crescent Society spoke of Hamas' efforts to "lure the ambulances into the heart of a battle to transport fighters to safety" and the hijacking of the al-Quds Hospital's fleet of ambulances.

The IDF claimed that Hamas operated a command and control center inside Shifa Hospital in Gaza City throughout the War, and that Hamas field commanders exploited the daily cessation in fighting that the IDF established for humanitarian purposes to receive instructions from senior Hamas officials. Addressing the Israeli cabinet, an intelligence official claimed that senior members of Hamas sought refuge in the sub-level floors believing that Israel would not target them for fear that such a strike would invariably lead to heavy collateral damage to the hospital patients in the upper floors. Next to the hospital, Militants set up posts that were used for the firing of mortars. Underneath a mosque that was located alongside the hospital was discovered a tunnel leading to the maternity ward, which was used by Hamas operatives to move undetected. After an Israeli airstrike on the central prison, which resulted in prisoners being released into the streets, several of the 115 prisoners accused of collaboration with Israel who had not yet been tried were executed by Hamas militants wearing civilian clothes in the Shifa hospital compound.

The Intelligence and Terrorism Information Center, an Israel-based group with close ties to the Israeli military establishment, reported that Hamas made extensive use of the Al-Fahoura Medical Centre and that they established a military camp and training base next to it. The ITIC released aerial pictures showing tunnels dug around the building and the medical centre and that the area surrounding the hospital was heavily mined. Rockets were launched in close proximity of the centre. The ITIC report stated that Hamas used 10 Gazan hospitals for launching rockets at Israeli towns and for attacking IDF troops.

Hamas also set up a command centre within a children's hospital located in the Nasser neighbourhood of Gaza City, which was used by top Hamas leadership on the night of 27 December. Senior Hamas commanders also set up a command center in a Red Crescent Society clinic in Khan Yunis.

An IDF probe, released on 22 April 2009, stated that a UN vehicle was attacked by Israeli forces because a Palestinian anti-tank squad was being unloaded from the vehicle.

Amnesty International rejected the charges by Israel that Hamas had systematically used medical facilities, vehicles and uniforms as a cover, stating that no evidence had been provided proving such actions. Further, Magen David Adom's submission to the UN Mission investigating the war stated "there was no use of PRCS ambulances for the transport of weapons or ammunition ... [and] there was no misuse of the emblem by PRCS."

Following its investigations the Goldstone report concluded that it "did not find any evidence to support the allegations that hospital facilities were used by the Gaza authorities or by Palestinian armed groups to shield military activities and that ambulances were used to transport combatants or for other military purposes".

== Effects ==
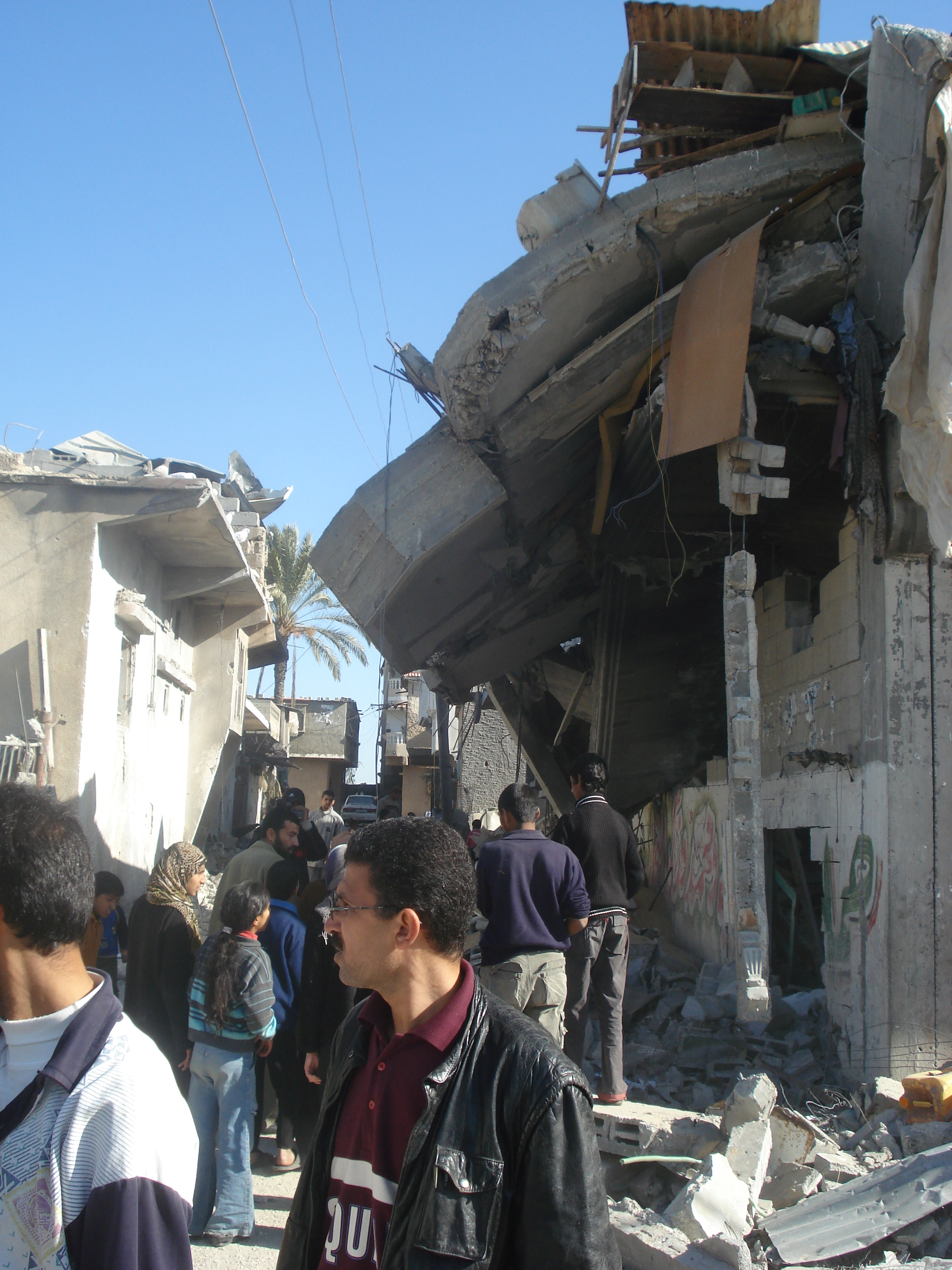
Destroyed buildings in Gaza City, January 2009

Children walking by a destroyed mosque in the Gaza Strip

Along with a high casualty rate, there were multiple economic, industrial and medical effects of the Gaza War. The United Nations Development Programme warned that there will be long-term consequences of the attacks on Gaza because the livelihoods and assets of tens of thousands of Gaza civilians have been affected.

Early estimates by independent contractors in Gaza say that Gaza lost nearly $2 billion in assets, including 4,000 homes destroyed. The IDF destroyed 600–700 factories, small industries, workshops and business enterprises throughout the Gaza Strip, 24 mosques, 31 security compounds, and 10 water or sewage lines. The World Health Organization said that 34 health facilities (8 hospitals and 26 primary health care clinics) were damaged over the course of the offensive and the UNOCHA said that over 50 United Nations facilities sustained damage, of which 28 reported damage in the first three days of the operation. On 22 January 2010, Israel paid $10.5 million in compensation to the United Nations for damage to UN property incurred during the Israeli offensive.

A satellite-based damage assessment of the Gaza Strip by the United Nations revealed 2,692 destroyed and severely damaged buildings, 220 impact craters on roads and bridges with an estimated length of 167 km (104 mi) of paved and unpaved roads damaged, 714 impact craters on open ground or cultivated land with an estimated land area of 2,100 hectares (21 km^{2}), 187 greenhouses completely destroyed or severely damaged with an estimated area of 28 hectares (0.28 km^{2}), and 2,232 hectares (22.32 km^{2}) of demolished zones targeted by IDF bulldozers, tanks and phosphorus shelling.

=== Health problems in Gaza ===
Following the war, Gaza has witnessed increasing epidemics of health problems. At the Al Shifa hospital a constant increase in the percentage of children born with birth defects of about 60% was witnessed when the period of July to September 2008 was compared to the same period in 2009. Dr. Mohammed Abu Shaban, director of the Blood Tumors Department in Al-Rantisy Hospital in Gaza has witnessed an increase in the number of cases of blood cancer. In March 2010 the department had seen 55 cases so far for that year, compared to the 20 to 25 cases normally seen in an entire year. During the war, Norwegian medics said that they had found traces of depleted uranium, a radioactive and genotoxic material used in some types of munition, in some Gaza residents who were wounded. Lawyers who brought back soil samples from Gaza said that areas where these samples were taken contained up to 75 tons of depleted uranium. The Israeli government denied it used Depleted Uranium, and the United Nations opened an investigation. Israel had also initially denied the use of white phosphorus during the war, but later acknowledged that indeed it had used white phosphorus to cover troop movements.

The policy of the Government of Israel is to condition the access of Palestinians who live in the Palestinian territories to healthcare in Israel upon financial coverage from the Palestinian Authority. In January 2009, following the war, the Palestinian Authority cancelled financial coverage for all medical care for Palestinians in Israeli hospitals, including coverage for chronically ill Palestinian patients, and those in need of complex care that is not available in other tertiary medical centers in the region. This decision was protested by human rights organizations.

=== Gaza humanitarian crisis ===
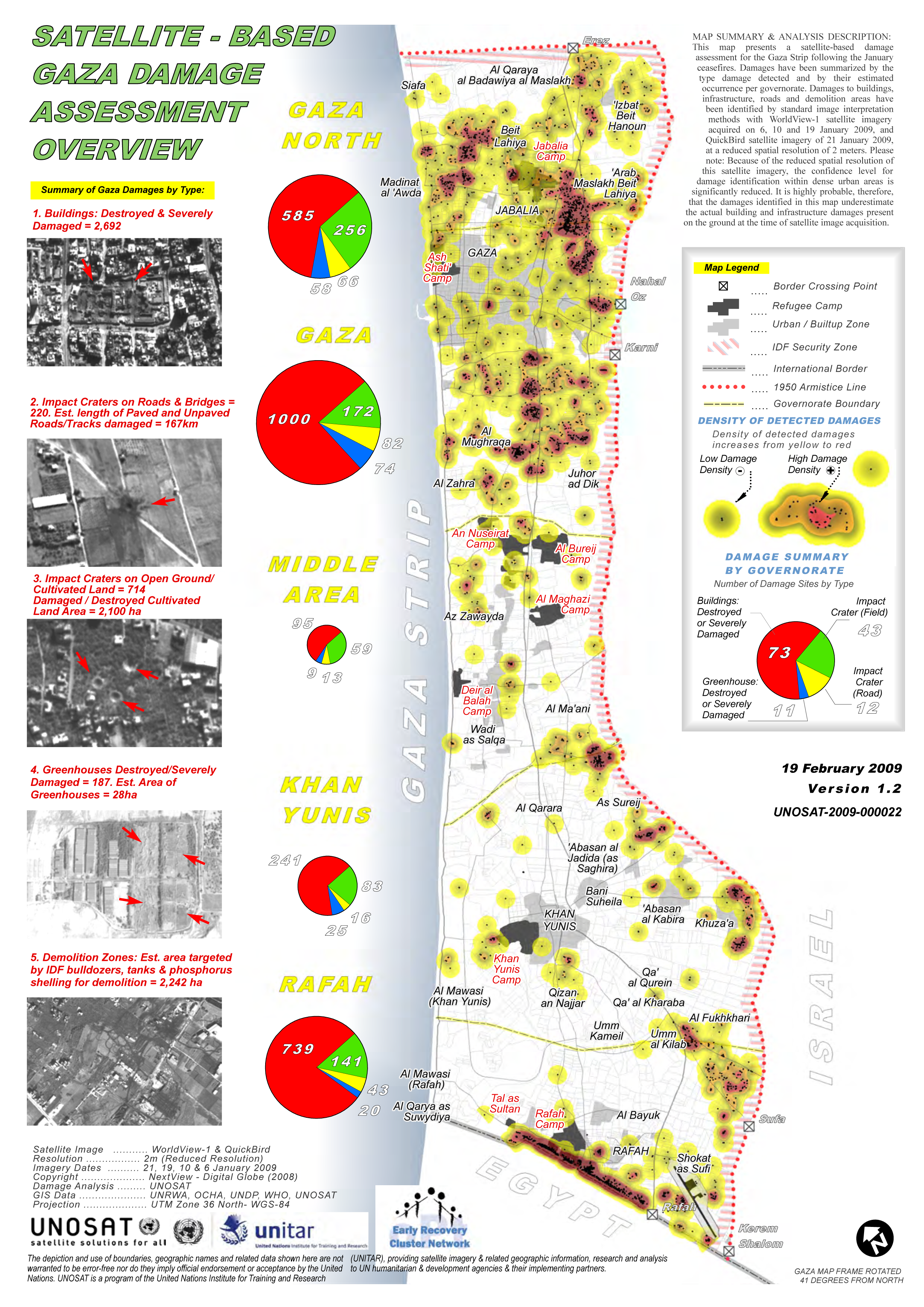
A satellite-based damage assessment of the Gaza Strip by the United Nations (UNOSAT, February 2009)

The United Nations Office for the Coordination of Humanitarian Affairs reported that the Gaza humanitarian crisis is significant and should not be understated. It also states that the situation is a "human dignity crisis" in the Gaza strip, entailing "a massive destruction of livelihoods and a significant deterioration of infrastructure and basic services". Fear and panic are widespread; 80% of the population could not support themselves and were dependent on humanitarian assistance. The International Red Cross said the situation was "intolerable" and a "full blown humanitarian crisis". The importation of necessary food and supplies continues to be blocked even after the respective ceasefires. According to the World Food Programme, the UN's Food and Agriculture Organization and Palestinian officials, between 35% and 60% of the agriculture industry was wrecked. With extensive damage occurring to water sources, greenhouses, and farmland. It is estimated that 60% of the agricultural land in the north of the Strip may no longer be arable. More than 50,800 Gazans were left homeless. Extensive destruction was caused to commercial enterprises and to public infrastructure. According to Palestinian industrialists, 219 factories were destroyed or severely damaged during the Israeli military operation. They accounted as part of the 3% of industrial capacity that was operating after the Israeli blockade was imposed, which was mostly destroyed during the operation.

On 3 January before the IDF ground operation, Israel's foreign minister Tzipi Livni said that Israel had taken care to protect the civilian population of Gaza, and that it had kept the humanitarian situation "completely as it should be", maintaining Israel's earlier stance. The secretary-general of the Arab League, Amr Moussa, criticized Livni's statement and further criticized the Security Council for not responding faster to the crisis. On subsequent reports, the UN stated that "only an immediate cease-fire will be able to address the large-scale humanitarian and protection crisis that faces the people of Gaza."

The Emergency Relief Coordinator of the United Nations has stated that after the end of the Israeli operation, at best, only 120 truckloads get into Gaza, instead of the normal daily requirement, including commercial traffic, of 500 trucks at minimum. It is also reported in his statement and other UN humanitarian office reports that essential items such as construction materials, water pipes, electrical wires, and transformers continue to be effectively banned, or only allowed infrequently. He also stated that commercial goods must be allowed in and out, since Gaza Palestinians "do not want or deserve to be dependent on humanitarian aid" and that the "limited trickle" of items into Gaza continue the effective collective punishment of the civilian population and force the counter-productive reliance on tunnels for daily essentials.

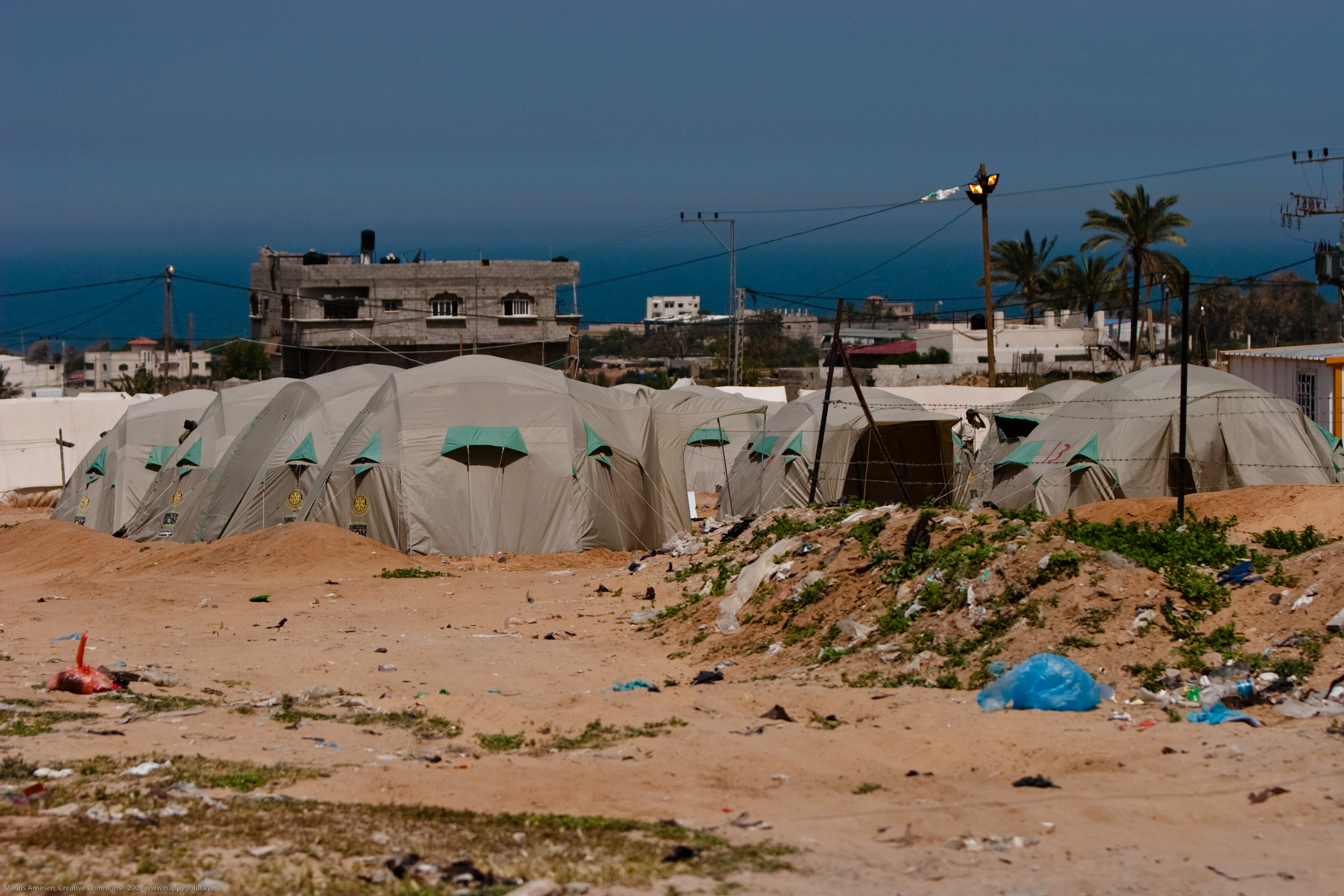
Tent camp, Gaza Strip, April 2009

As a result of the conflict, the European Union, the Organisation of the Islamic Conference and over 50 nations donated humanitarian aid to Gaza, including the United States, which donated over $20 million. On 7 January a UN Relief Works Agency spokesman acknowledged that he was "aware of instances where deliveries of humanitarian aid into Gaza" were diverted by the Hamas government, though never from his agency. Additionally, on 3 February, blankets and food parcels were confiscated by Hamas police personnel from an UNRWA distribution center, and on 4 February, the UN Emergency Relief Coordinator demanded that the aid be returned immediately. The Hamas government issued a statement stating that the incident was a misunderstanding between the drivers of the trucks and has been resolved through direct contact with the UNRWA. On 9 February, UNRWA lifted the suspension on the movement of its humanitarian supplies into Gaza, after the Hamas authorities returned all the aid supplies confiscated. The UN Office for the Coordination of Humanitarian Affairs has described the Israeli procedures for humanitarian organizations entrance to Gaza as inconsistent and unpredictable ones that impedes the ability of organizations to effectively plan their humanitarian response and obstructs efforts to address the humanitarian crisis brought by the 18 months blockade and Israel's military operation. The UN also reported that international organizations faced "unprecedented denial" of access to Gaza by Israel since 5 November and that humanitarian access remained unreliable and needed to be granted on an unrestricted daily basis.

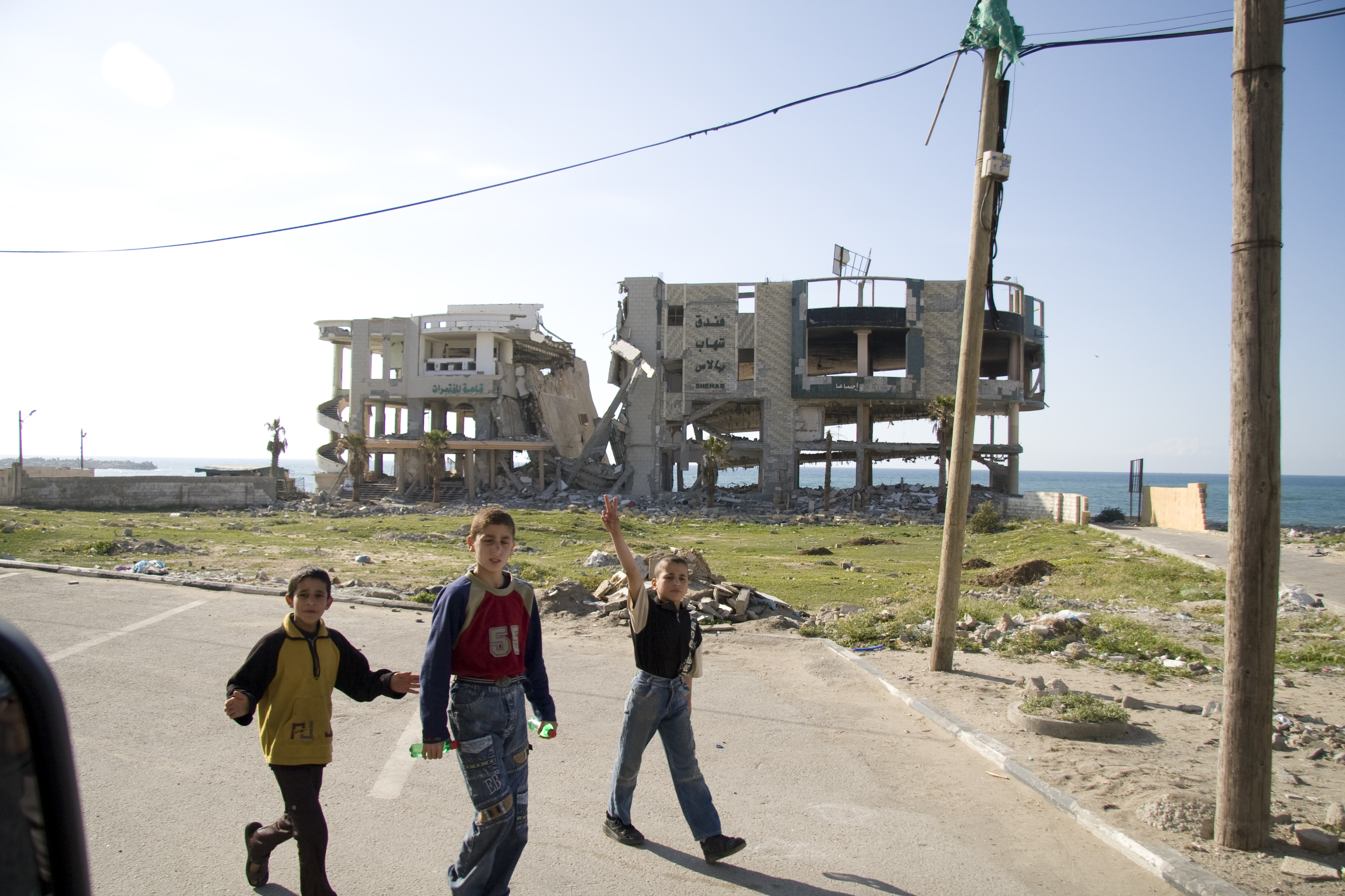
Destroyed buildings in Gaza

In a damage assessment by the World Health Organization, 48% of the 122 health facilities assessed were found to be damaged or destroyed, 15 of Gaza's 27 hospitals and 41 primary health care centers suffered damage, and 29 ambulances were partially damaged or destroyed. Injured patients needing referral outside Gaza for specialized care were evacuated exclusively through the Egyptian Rafah border crossing. In the early stages of the conflict, Hamas sealed the border, and prevented wounded Palestinians from seeking medical attention in Egypt. On 30 December, the organization allowed a trickle of medical evacuations from Gaza, but restricted their number. Gaza Ministry of Health reported that between 29 December and 22 January 608 injured were evacuated through Rafah. The Israeli Erez crossing was closed much of the period and only 30 patients were able to exit during the crisis. An initial survey conducted by the United Nations Development Programme (UNDP) estimates that 14,000 homes, 68 government buildings, and 31 non-governmental organization offices (NGOs) were either totally or partially damaged, creating about 600,000 tonnes of concrete rubble needing to be removed. Since 2007, Israel has not permitted the entry of construction material into Gaza, adversely affecting UN projects, in particular UNRWA and UNDP, who suspended more than $100 million in construction projects due to lack of materials.

The Israeli Health Ministry and Magen David Adom established an emergency clinic for wounded Gazans at the Erez crossing on 17 June. The clinic received only patients, none of them with war-related injuries, and it was suspected that Hamas had instructed civilians not to seek treatment there. The clinic closed after ten days. Subsequently, the Jordanian Army established a field hospital in the Gaza Strip, which is still operating. The hospital's equipment, staff, and military guards are transferred from Jordan through Israel via the Allenby Bridge, and outgoing personnel return the same way.

One year after the ceasefire approximately 20,000 people remained displaced.

=== Effects on Israel ===
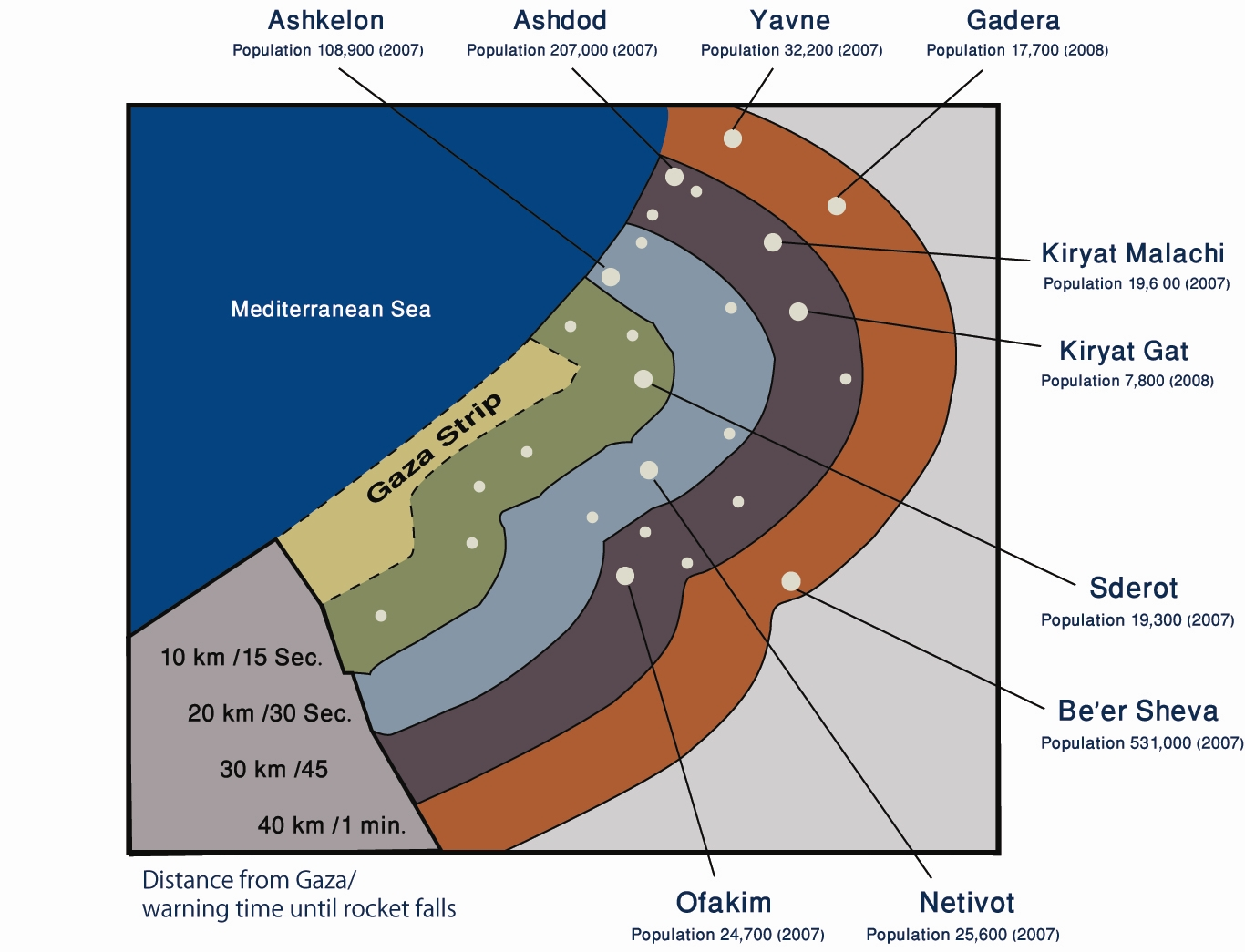
According to HRW, during the Gaza War, rocket attacks placed up to 800,000 people within range of attack.

During the conflict, life in much of southern Israel was largely paralyzed by more than 30 Hamas rocket and mortar strikes. The Israeli Home Front Command issued detailed emergency instructions to Israeli citizens for preparing for and dealing with rocket attacks from the Gaza Strip. The instructions included orders to stay within a certain distance of bomb shelters based on proximity to the source of the rockets. Hamas' Grad rockets' increased range of 40 km put more than 700,000 Israelis within strike range, prompting 40% of the residents of the southern city of Ashkelon to flee the city, despite official calls to stay. Throughout the war, Palestinian rocket attacks into Israel damaged or destroyed more than 1,500 homes and buildings and 327 vehicles. Numerous agricultural fields near Gaza also sustained damage. Twenty-eight Israeli families lost their homes to rocket attacks, and had to temporarily live in hotels. Among the buildings hit were nine educational facilities and three synagogues.

Schools and universities in southern Israel began to close due to rocket threats on 27 December. Studies officially resumed on 11 January. Only schools with fortified classrooms and bomb shelters were allowed to bring students in, and IDF Home Front Command representatives were stationed in the schools; attendance was low. Palestinian rocket attacks that hit educational facilities caused no casualties.

The largest hospital on Israel's southern coast, Ashkelon's Barzilai Medical Center, moved its critical treatment facilities into an underground shelter after a rocket struck beside its helicopter pad on 28 December.

Most business in Southern Israel stopped upon orders of the Home Front Command, with retailers losing an estimated $7 million in the first week. Numerous small businesses suffered in decreased sales, and were unable to pay employee salaries due to low revenues. Major industries remained open, but had high absence rates. The Manufacturers Association of Israel estimated the direct cost to business and industry to be 88 million NIS, and indirect financial losses at several tens of millions of shekels.

The Israel Tax Authority received 1,728 compensation claims for damage related to the conflict, mostly from Ashkelon and Ashdod.

According to Israeli economist Ron Eichel, the war effort cost the Israeli military about 5 billion NIS in military expenditure, or 250 million NIS per day. An anonymous political source told Ynetnews that the aerial assaults were costing $27 million to $39 million a day in munitions and fuel, totaling the first six days of the operation at nearly $265 million for air-strikes alone. Both the IDF and Treasury refused to disclose the exact amount, and the Treasury adamantly denied these figures.

== International law ==
Accusations of violations regarding international humanitarian law, which governs the actions by belligerents during an armed conflict, have been directed at both Israel and Hamas for their actions during the Gaza War. The accusations covered violating laws governing distinction and proportionality by Israel, the indiscriminate firing of rockets at civilian locations and extrajudicial violence within the Gaza Strip by Hamas. As of September 2009, some 360 complaints had been filed by individuals and NGOs at the prosecutor's office in the Hague calling for investigations into alleged crimes committed by Israel during the Gaza War.

On 15 September 2009, a 574-page report by UN inquiry team was released, officially titled "Human Rights in Palestine and Other Occupied Arab Territories: Report of the United Nations Fact Finding Mission on the Gaza Conflict". It concluded that the Israel Defense Forces (IDF) and Palestinian armed groups committed war crimes and possibly crimes against humanity. On 16 October 2009, the UN Human Rights Council endorsed the report. Israel's defense minister said that the report was distorted, falsified and not balanced.

Human rights organizations have urged both Israel and Hamas to implement an independent investigation into the alleged violations of international law as stipulated by the Goldstone report.

On 1 April 2011, Goldstone wrote an op-ed that appeared in The Washington Post in which he stated that he no longer believes the report's finding that Israel targeted Palestinian civilians as a matter of policy, the most serious accusation the report made against Israel. The three other signatories to the UNHRC report, Hina Jilani, Christine Chinkin and Desmond Travers, co-authored an op-ed that appeared in The Guardian in which they replied that there was no evidence that refutes any of the report's findings.

In April 2012, the International Criminal Court (ICC) rejected the Palestinian Authority's (PA) request that Israel be investigated for claimed war crimes in Gaza in 2009, holding that since the PA is recognized by the UN General Assembly as an "observer" rather than a "state", the ICC lacked jurisdiction to hear its request. The decision was heavily criticized by human rights groups.

=== Right to resist and the right to self-defence ===
Legal professor Jerome Slater writes, in the context of Operation Cast Lead, that Palestinians in principle have the right to resist Israeli occupation (thought this right does not allow for attacks on civilians). And while Israel has the right of self-defense, it forfeited this right when it occupied and repressed Palestinians. Just war theory allows war only if every effort to a political solution has failed. Slater argues that in the lead up to the war, Israel frequently refused to negotiate ceasefires with Hamas, or it violated the very ceasefire it had agreed to.

== Media ==
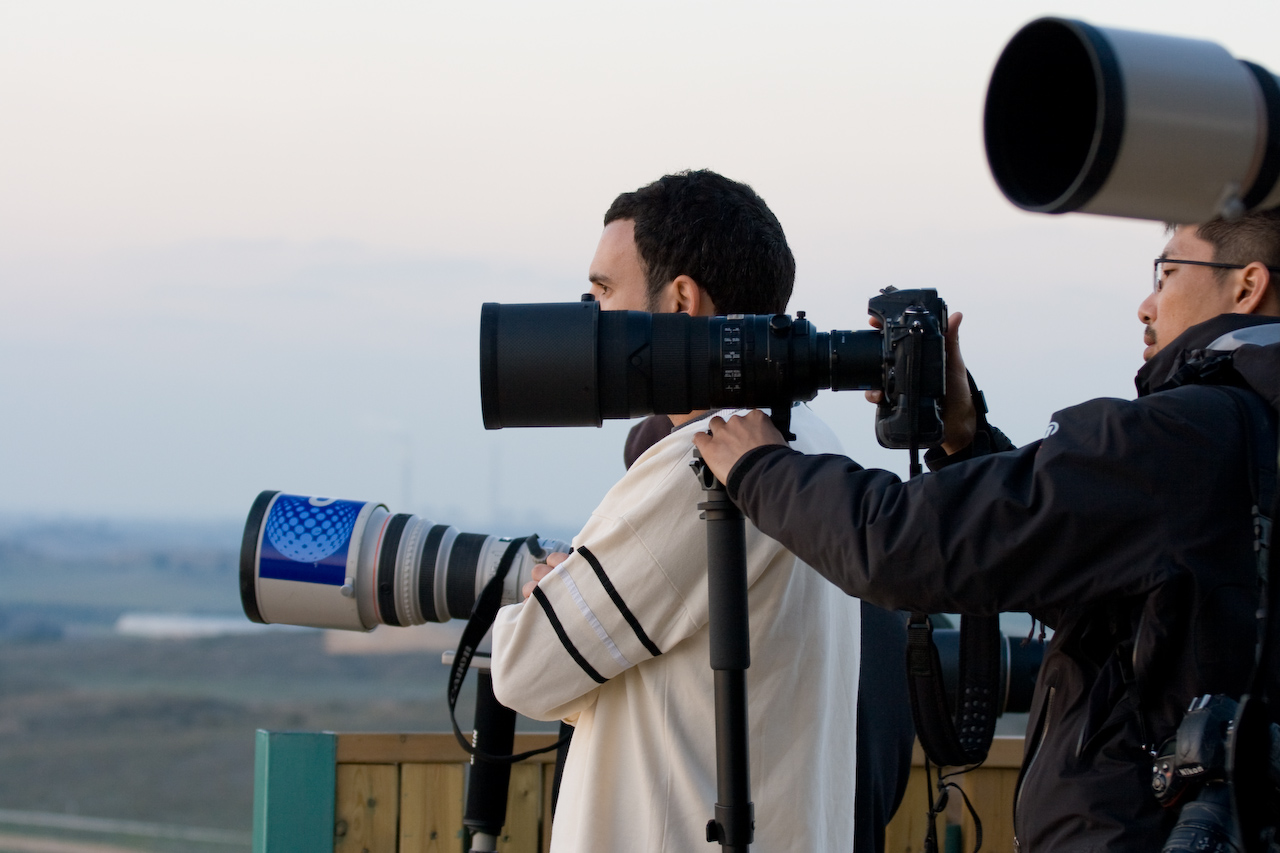
Photojournalists during the conflict

International news networks named the conflict "War in Gaza" and focused on the assault. Israeli media called it the "War in the South" (Hebrew: מלחמה בדרום Milẖama BaDarom) and dispatched reporters to Israeli towns hit by rockets. Al Jazeera suggested that it was a war against Palestinian civilians with the title "War on Gaza".

=== Denied media access ===
Reporter access to the war zone was limited. During the Gaza raids against Hamas, the Israeli army denied international media access to the conflict zone, against a decision by the Israeli Supreme Court to lift the embargo. The Foreign Press Association of Israel released a statement saying, "The unprecedented denial of access to Gaza for the world's media amounts to a severe violation of press freedom and puts the state of Israel in the company of a handful of regimes around the world which regularly keep journalists from doing their jobs."

=== Attacks on the media ===
Media facilities in Gaza, both foreign and domestic, came under Israeli fire in the military campaign. On one occasion a Grad rocket may have been launched from a location near the television studios in the Al-Shuruk tower in Gaza City. Although the Israeli recording of a reporter describing a rocket launch was during the initial aerial bombardment phase the tower was only bombed in the final few days. On 29 December the IDF destroyed the facilities and headquarters of Al-Aqsa TV (though broadcasts continue from elsewhere), and a week later, IDF soldiers entered the building and seized the equipment. The Israelis also hacked into the station's signal and broadcast an animated clip of Hamas' leadership being gunned down. On 5 January the IDF bombed the offices of the Hamas-affiliated Al-Risala newsweekly. On 9 January the IDF hit the Johara tower of Gaza City, which houses more than 20 international news organizations, including Turkish, French, and Iranian outlets. The IDF Spokesperson's Unit said that the building had not been targeted, though it may have sustained damage from a nearby Israeli strike.

On 12 January two Arab journalists from Jerusalem working for an Iranian television station were arrested by Israeli Police and indicted in the Jerusalem District Court for violating military censorship protocols. They had reported on the IDF ground offensive hours before they were cleared to do so. The journalists maintained that they merely stated what was already being said in the international media.

=== New media ===
Media relations also played an important role, with the use of new media (up to and including cyber warfare) on the part of both Israel and Hamas. Haaretz reported that Israeli Foreign Minister Tzipi Livni "instructed senior ministry officials to open an aggressive and diplomatic international public relations campaign to gain support for Israel Defense Forces operations in the Gaza Strip". Israeli officials at embassies and consulates worldwide have mounted campaigns in local media, and to that end have recruited people who speak the native language. Israel has also opened an international media centre in Sderot. To improve Israeli public relations, the Ministry of Immigrant Absorption has recruited 1,000 volunteers with the objective of flooding news websites and blogs that the ministry term as anti-Israeli with pro-Israeli opinions. Volunteers proficient in languages other than Hebrew were particularly sought after.

Foreign Press Branch head Avital Leibovich believes the "new media" is another war zone, stating, "We have to be relevant there." As part of its public-relations campaign, the Israeli army opened a YouTube channel "through which it will disseminate footage of precision bombing operations in the Gaza Strip, as well as aid distribution and other footage of interest to the international community".

== Reactions ==
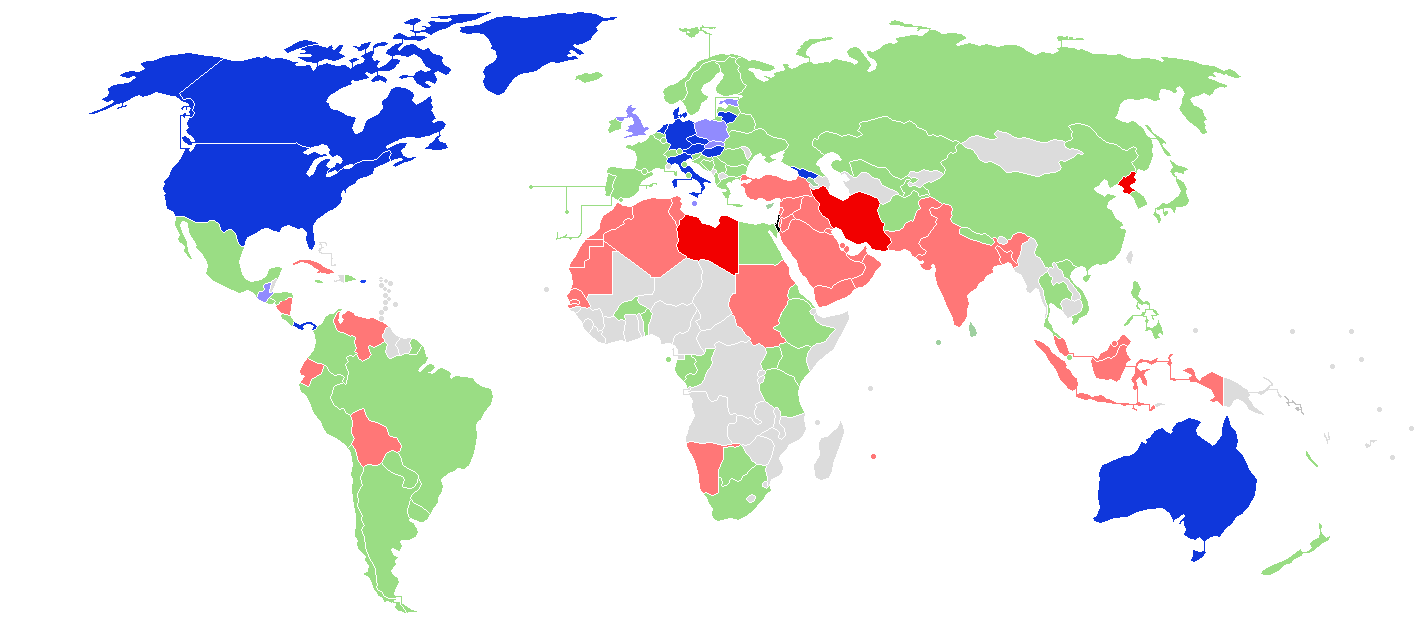
Governmental proclamations regarding the 2008–2009 Israel–Gaza conflict Israel-Gaza Endorsed the Israeli position/defined Israel's action as falling within its right to defense. Condemned Hamas action only. Called for an end to hostilities, and condemned neither/both belligerents. Condemned Israeli action only. Endorsed the Hamas position/defined Hamas' actions as falling within its right of resistance. No official statement on the conflict.

While Israel defined its operation as a war against Hamas, Palestinian representatives and individuals, among others, viewed it as a "war on the Palestinian people".

The United Nations Security Council issued a statement on 28 December 2008, calling "for an immediate halt to all violence". The Arab League, the European Union and many nations made similar calls. On 9 January 2009, following an earlier, failed attempt at a ceasefire resolution, the United Nations Security Council passed Resolution 1860 calling for "an immediate, durable and fully respected cease-fire" leading to a full Israeli withdrawal and an end to Gaza arms smuggling, by 14 votes to one abstention (the United States). The resolution was ignored by both Israel and Hamas. One week later, on 16 January 2009, the General Assembly passed United Nations General Assembly Resolution ES-10/18, which aimed to enforce the earlier passed UN Security Council Resolution 1860. The resolution called for an immediate ceasefire, withdrawal of Israeli forces from Gaza, and unimpeded humanitarian aid distribution, and was subsequently adopted with overwhelming support (142–3) and 9 abstentions.

Many governments expressed positions on the conflict, most condemning both belligerents, or neither of them. Thirty-four states, mostly members of the Organisation of the Islamic Conference, condemned Israel's attacks exclusively. Three of them expressed support for Hamas' operations or defined them as falling within its right of resistance. Nineteen states, mostly members of the European Union, condemned Hamas' attacks exclusively. Thirteen of them expressed support for Israel's operations or defined them as falling within Israel's right to self-defense.

Bolivia, Jordan, Mauritania and Venezuela significantly downscaled or severed their relations with Israel in protest of the offensive.

The conflict saw worldwide civilian demonstrations for and against both sides.

The conflict triggered a wave of reprisal attacks against Jewish targets in Europe and elsewhere. The worldwide number of recorded antisemitic incidents during the conflict more than tripled the number of such incidents in the same period of the previous year, marking a two-decade high.

The British government reviewed its export licenses to Israel for violations of EU and national arms export control laws and revoked five export licenses for replacement parts and other equipment for Sa'ar 4.5 missile boats used by Israel because they were used in the Gaza offensive, although 16 export licenses for other British defense items to Israel were approved.

The conflict has been called the Gaza Massacre (Arabic: مجزرة غزة) in the Arab world. Khaled Mashal, Hamas' leader in Damascus called for suicide bombings. Ismail Haniyeh, Prime Minister of the Hamas government in Gaza, said: "Palestine has never witnessed an uglier massacre."

On 28 December 2008, a Palestinian laborer working in the Israeli settlement of Modi'in Illit struck his supervisor on the head with a sledgehammer, stabbed and injured four civilians, and beat up several others. He was shot and severely wounded by an emergency response team member as he attempted to flee. His actions were suspected of being a reprisal for Israel's attack. The worker had been employed in the city for about 10 years with no previous trouble, but had spoken out against the war shortly before his rampage.

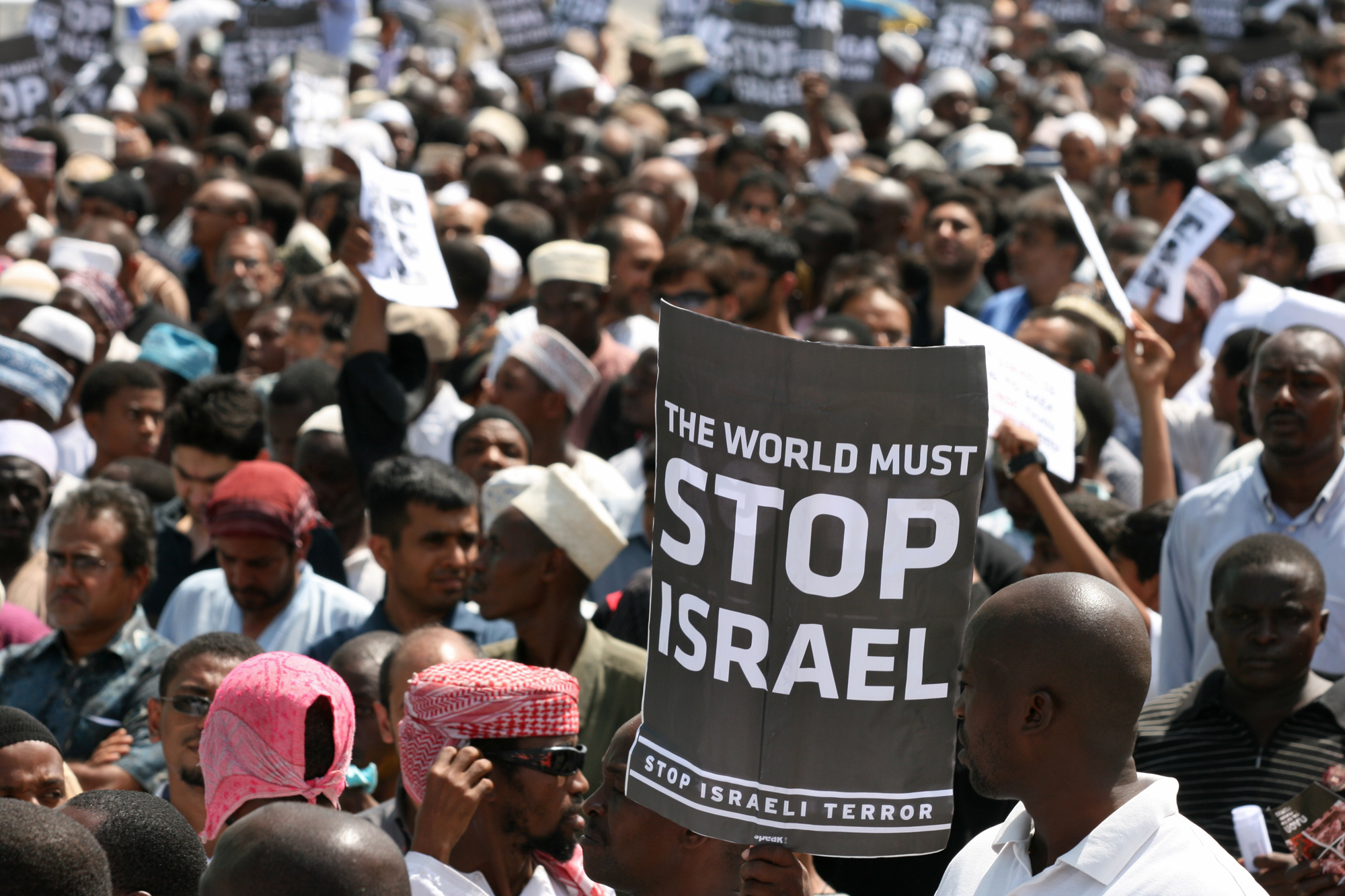
Protest against the war in Dar es Salaam, Tanzania

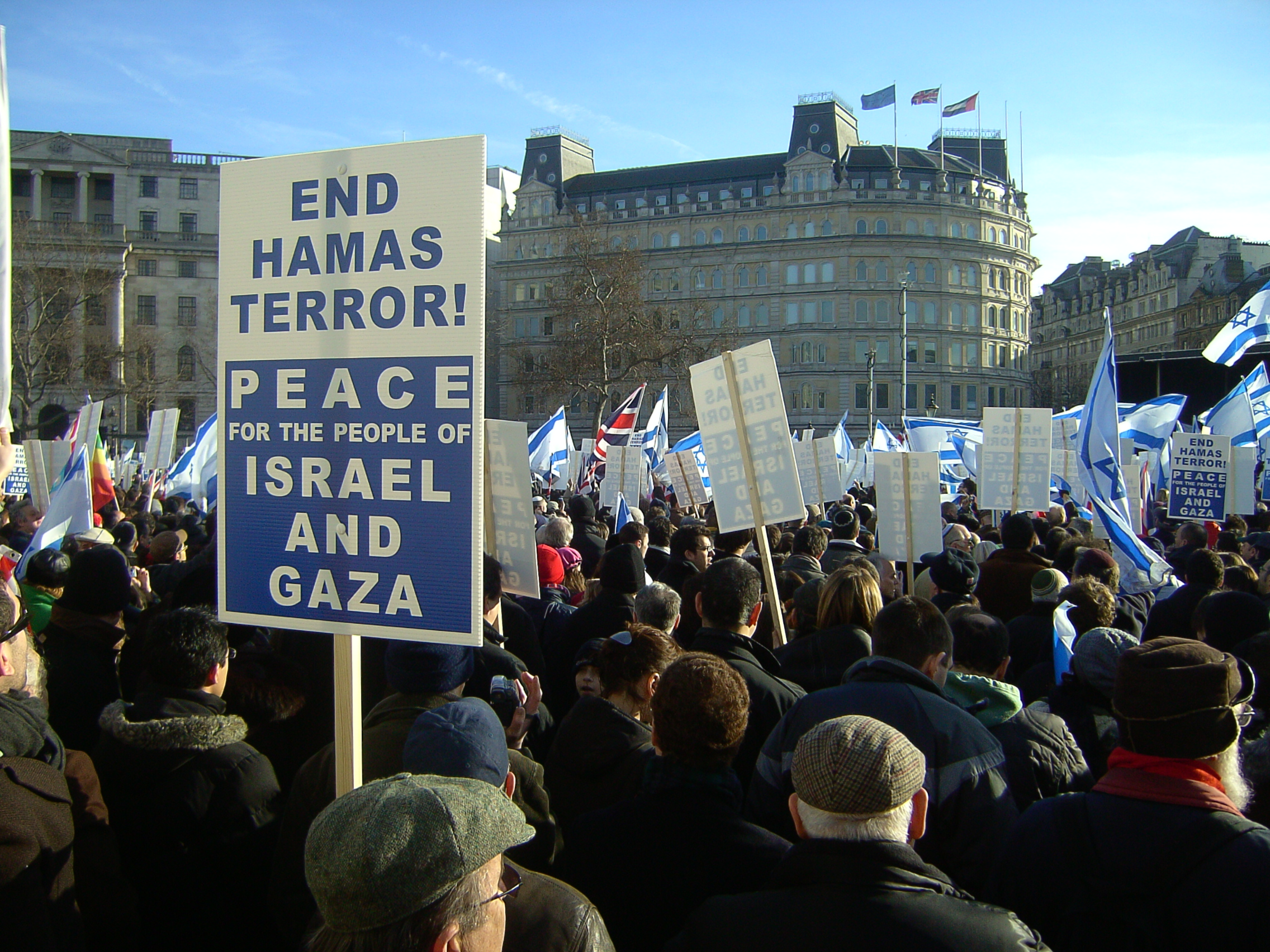
Pro-Israel protest in London, UK

=== Reactions in Israel ===
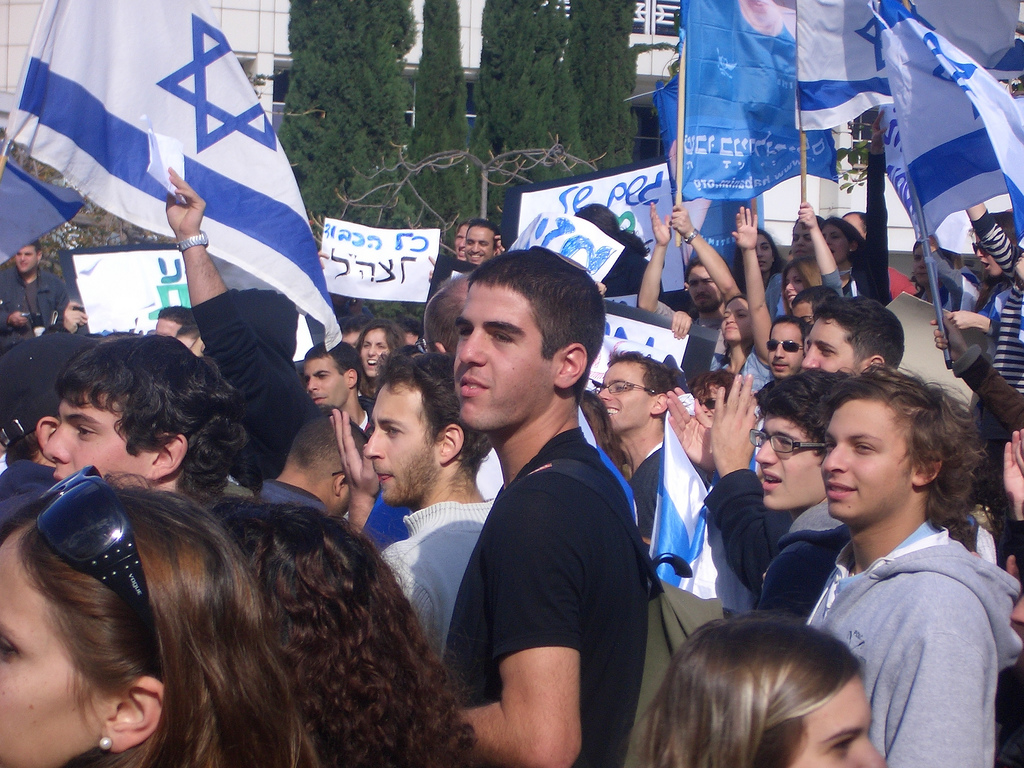
Tel-Aviv University students demonstrating in support for operation "Cast Lead" and the citizens of south Israel

The war provoked mixed reactions inside Israel, with the Jewish majority largely supporting it, and the Arab minority mostly opposing it. A poll taken on 8 January 2009 showed that 91% of the Jewish public supported the war, and 4% opposed it, while a separate poll conducted 4–6 January showed a 94% approval of the war among Jews and 85% disapproval among Israeli Arabs. Most right-wing opposition parties including Likud, National Union, National Religious Party and Yisrael Beiteinu opposed the ceasefire and urged to continue the operation until Hamas is fully defeated.

During the war, Arab protests took place across the country. Within hours of the war's start, the Higher Follow-Up Committee for Arab citizens of Israel met in Nazareth, and declared a "day of wrath and mourning for the martyrs among our compatriots in the Gaza Strip", and a general strike for the following day. Arab demonstrations took place across the country almost every day during the offensive, and were described as the "largest Arab demonstrations in Israel's history". Arab parties and parliamentarians in the Knesset also opposed the offensive. In Jerusalem, Arabs held violent demonstrations, which included rock-throwing, arson, and the vandalization of Jewish graves. Police arrested dozens of rioters. At the University of Haifa, Tel Aviv University and the Hebrew University of Jerusalem, Jewish leftist and Arab students staged anti-war demonstrations, which were met with pro-war counter-demonstrations. Some confrontations occurred despite police keeping protesters apart.

The legal rights agency Adalah produced a report highly critical of the Israeli police and court system's response to the opposition to Operation Cast Lead. The report said that the Israeli authorities had shown a lack of tolerance for protests, and had damaged the freedom of expression of those opposing the attacks on Gaza. The report said that the actions showed the lessons of the Or Commission had not been learned. The Israeli Ministry of Justice responded that the risk to human life and public welfare had justified their actions.

The term Sderot cinema has been coined for the tradition of residents in Sderot sitting to view the bombardment of the Gaza Strip.

== See also ==
- 2008 Israel–Hamas ceasefire
- Civil defense in Israel
- Effects of the Gaza War (2008–09)
- Gaza Strip smuggling tunnels
- Iran–Israel proxy conflict
- Izz ad-Din al-Qassam Brigades (Hamas' military wing)
- List of invasions in the 21st century
- List of modern conflicts in the Middle East
- Military equipment of Israel
- Palestinian domestic weapons production
- Palestinian political violence
- R v Saibene
- Roof knocking
- Shurrab family
