= Dahiya doctrine =

Israeli strategy of destroying civilian buildings

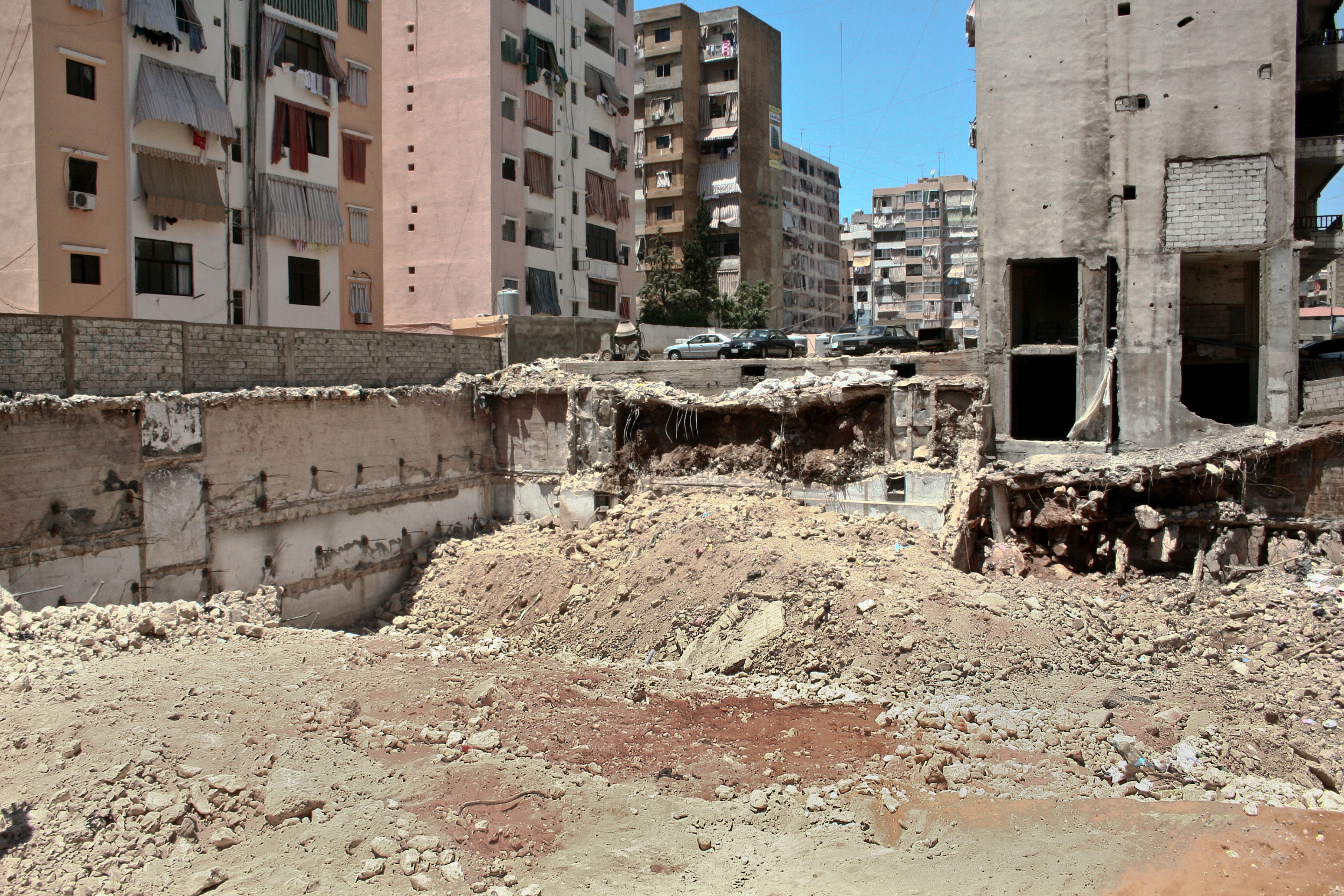
A crater in Dahieh in 2008, two years after the 2006 Lebanon War

The Dahiya doctrine, also spelled Dahya or Dahieh, is an Israeli military strategy involving the large-scale destruction of civilian infrastructure to pressure hostile governments. Analysts and human rights experts have described it as a form of domicide. The doctrine was outlined by former Israel Defense Forces (IDF) Chief of General Staff Gadi Eizenkot. Israeli colonel Gabi Siboni wrote that Israel "should target economic interests and the centers of civilian power that support the organization", the immediate intent inferred as to harm the civilian population to such an extent that they turn on the militants, whose likelihood to sue for peace is thereby increased rather than fighting a protracted guerilla war.

== Etymology ==
Dahieh means "suburb" in Arabic and in the Lebanese context it usually refers to the southern (and, until its destruction in the Lebanese civil war 1976, the eastern) suburbs of Beirut. It consists of quarters and villages around Beirut, where Shi'ite refugees from south Lebanon settled in the 1970s and 1980s. The epicenter of the Dahieh became the former Maronite village of Haret Hreik, now a suburb of Maronite/Shiite population. Hezbollah established its headquarters in the Dahieh and it was heavily damaged by the IDF during the 2006 Lebanon War.

== History ==
=== 2006 Lebanon War ===
The first public announcement of the doctrine was made in an interview with general Gadi Eizenkot, commander of the IDF's northern front, published by Yedioth Ahronoth in October 2008:

What happened in the Dahieh quarter of Beirut in 2006 will happen in every village from which shots will be fired in the direction of Israel. We will wield disproportionate power and cause immense damage and destruction. From our perspective, these are military bases. […] This isn't a suggestion. It's a plan that has already been authorized. […] Every one of the Shiite villages is a military site, with headquarters, an intelligence center, and a communications center. Dozens of rockets are buried in houses, basements, attics, and the village is run by Hezbollah men. In each village, according to its size, there are dozens of active members, the local residents, and alongside them fighters from outside, and everything is prepared and planned both for a defensive battle and for firing missiles at Israel. […] Hezbollah understands well that its fire from within villages will lead to their destruction. Before Nasrallah gives the order to fire at Israel, he will need to think 30 times if he wants to destroy his support base in the villages. This is not a theoretical matter for him. The possibility of harm to the population is the main factor restraining Nasrallah, and the reason for the quiet in the last two years.

In 2010, Eizenkot formulated his views in writing as follows:

The method of action in Lebanon [in 2006] was that, in the first stage targets were attacked which formed an immediate threat, and in the second stage the population was evacuated for its protection, and only after the evacuation of the population were Hezbollah targets attacked more broadly. I am convinced that this pattern was a moral pattern, that it was correct to use, and if another campaign is required it will be correct to act in the same way. It is Hezbollah which transforms the hundreds of villages and the Shiite areas of Lebanon into combat spaces. I hope this understanding will cause the organization to consider carefully before it decides to use any more terror, kidnapping, or shootings.

In 2008, according to analyst Gabi Siboni at the Israeli Institute for National Security Studies:

With an outbreak of hostilities [with Hezbollah], the IDF will need to act immediately, decisively, and with force that is disproportionate to the enemy's actions and the threat it poses. Such a response aims at inflicting damage and meting out punishment to an extent that will demand long and expensive reconstruction processes. […] Israel's test will be the intensity and quality of its response to incidents on the Lebanese border or terrorist attacks involving Hizbollah in the north or Hamas in the south. In such cases, Israel again will not be able to limit its response to actions whose severity is seemingly proportionate to an isolated incident. Rather, it will have to respond disproportionately in order to make it abundantly clear that the State of Israel will accept no attempt to disrupt the calm currently prevailing along its borders. Israel must be prepared for deterioration and escalation, as well as for a full-scale confrontation. Such preparedness is obligatory in order to prevent long term attrition.

Noting that Dahya was the Shia quarter in Beirut that was razed by the Israeli Air Force during the 2006 Lebanon War, Israeli journalist Yaron London wrote in 2008 that the doctrine "will become entrenched in our security discourse".

=== Gaza ===
==== 2008–2009 ====
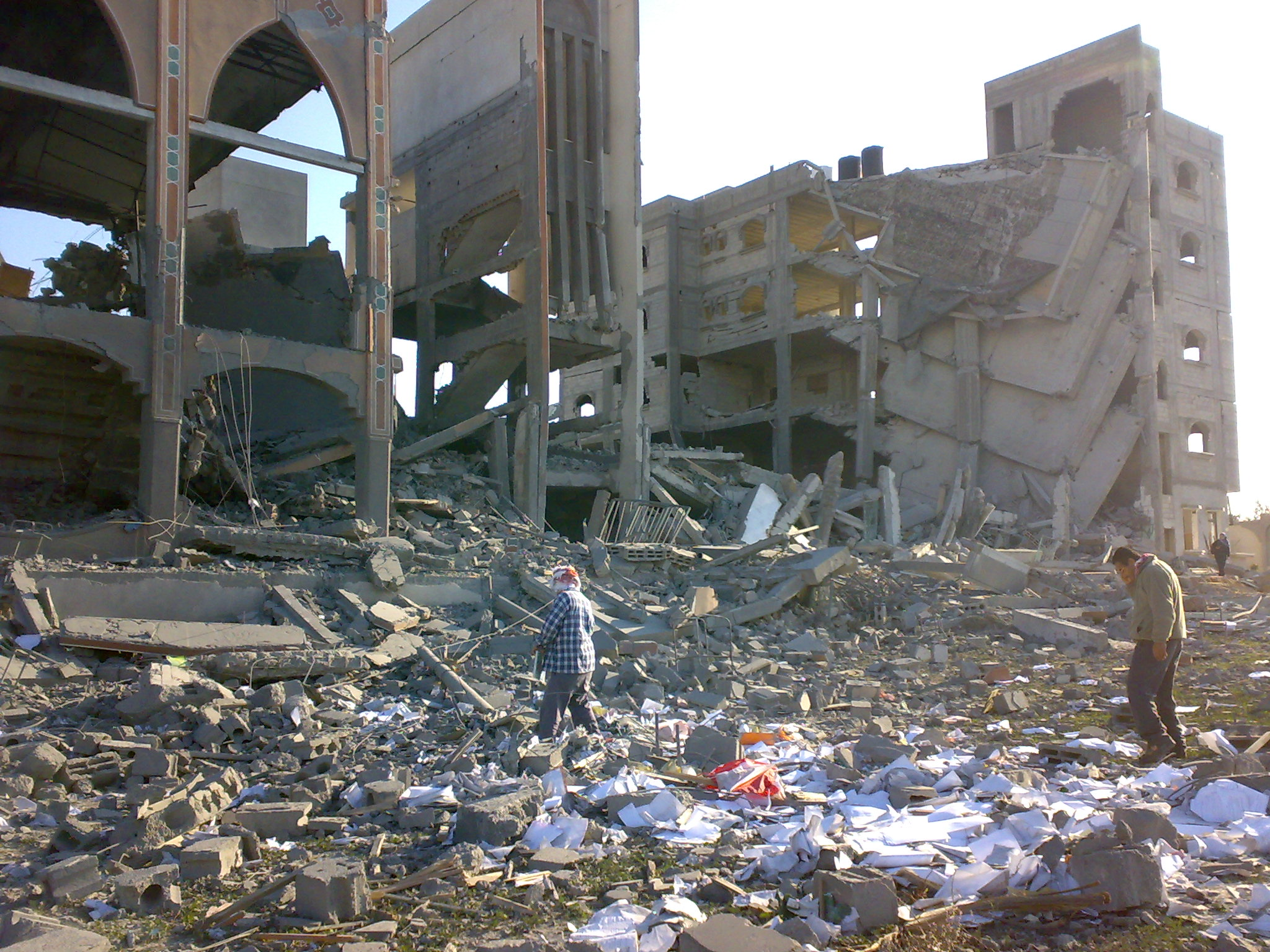
Destroyed building in Rafah, 12 January 2009

Some analysts have argued that Israel implemented such a strategy during the 2008–09 Gaza War, with the Goldstone Report concluding that the Israeli strategy was "designed to punish, humiliate and terrorize a civilian population".

The 2009 United Nations Fact Finding Mission on the Gaza Conflict makes several references to the Dahya doctrine, calling it a concept which requires the application of "widespread destruction as a means of deterrence" and which involves "the application of disproportionate force and the causing of great damage and destruction to civilian property and infrastructure, and suffering to civilian populations". It concluded that the doctrine had been put into practice during the conflict. However, in a 1 April 2011 op-ed, one of the lead authors of the report, Judge Richard Goldstone, stated that some of his conclusions may have been different had the Israeli government cooperated with his team during the investigation. Goldstone's three co-authors—Hina Jilani, Christine Chinkin, and Desmond Travers—were strongly critical of Goldstone's statement, releasing a statement standing by the report, claiming that in response to the pressure to change their conclusions "had we given in to pressures from any quarter to sanitise our conclusions, we would be doing a serious injustice to the hundreds of innocent civilians killed during the Gaza conflict, the thousands injured, and the hundreds of thousands whose lives continue to be deeply affected by the conflict and the blockade".

The doctrine is defined in a 2009 report by the Public Committee Against Torture in Israel as follows: "The military approach expressed in the Dahiye Doctrine deals with asymmetrical combat against an enemy that is not a regular army and is embedded within [the] civilian population; its objective is to avoid a protracted guerilla [sic] war. According to this approach Israel has to employ tremendous force disproportionate to the magnitude of the enemy's actions." The report characterizes its intent as "to harm the civilian population to such an extent that it will bring pressure to bear on the enemy combatants", citing Israeli reserve Major General Giora Eiland's remarks "[a]round the time that Eisenkott publicized the doctrine" as well as "to create deterrence regarding future attacks against Israel, through the damage and destruction of civilian and military infrastructures which necessitate long and expensive reconstruction actions which would crush the will of those who wish to act against Israel." Eiland's remarks were as follows:

Such a war will lead to the elimination of the Lebanese military, the destruction of the national infrastructure, and intense suffering among the population. There will be no recurrence of the situation where Beirut residents (not including the Dahiye quarter) go to the beach and cafes while Haifa residents sit in bomb shelters. Serious damage to the Republic of Lebanon, the destruction of homes and infrastructure, and the suffering of hundreds of thousands of people are consequences that can influence Hezbollah's behavior more than anything else.

The report additionally argues that the doctrine was fully implemented during Operation Cast Lead.

==== 2023–present ====
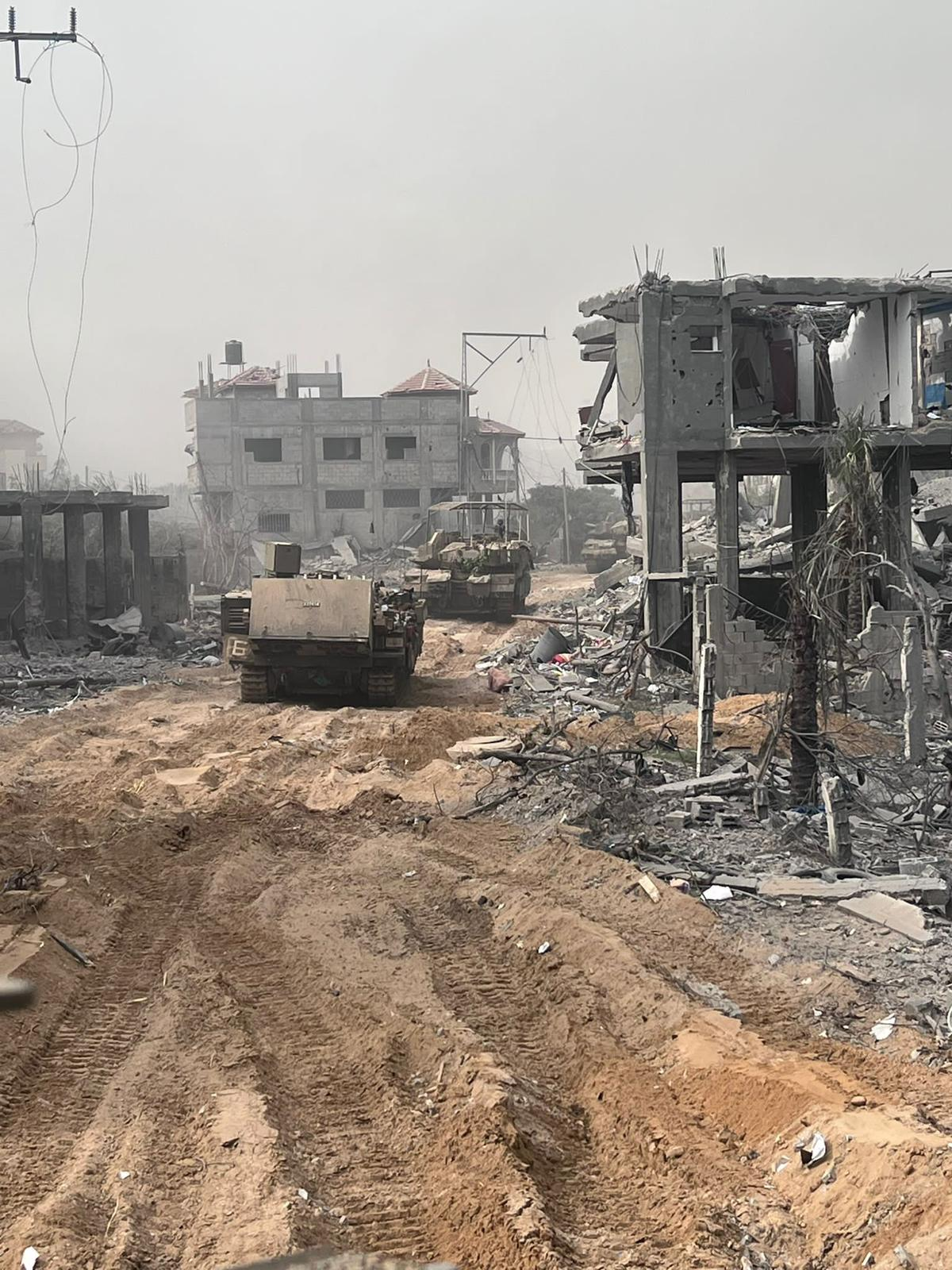
IDF tanks on operations in the Gaza Strip on 31 October

Commentators for The Guardian, The Washington Post, and Mondoweiss have noted that the attacks of the Israel Defense Forces on the civilian infrastructure of the Gaza Strip during the Gaza war may constitute an extension of the doctrine.

Writing in The Guardian, Paul Rogers of Bradford University argues that Israel's goal in the 2023 war is to "corral the Palestinians into a small zone in the southwest of Gaza where they can be more easily controlled", and that the long-term goal is to make clear that Israel "will not stand for any opposition".

Sources reportedly told +972 Magazine that bombing of non-military targets was to "lead civilians to put pressure on Hamas".

The extensive destruction of residential areas and infrastructure during the conflict has been characterized by analysts and human rights experts, including UN Special Rapporteur Balakrishnan Rajagopal, as domicide, or the systematic and widespread destruction of housing to make an area uninhabitable.

== Criticism ==
=== Counterproductive ===
Paul Rogers argues that in their using the Dahiya doctrine in the Israel–Hamas war, Israel will fail in its goal of eradicating Hamas, which will come back in a different form, unless "some way is found to begin the very difficult task of bringing the communities together."

=== Violation of international law ===
American legal scholar Richard A. Falk wrote that under the doctrine, "the civilian infrastructure of adversaries such as Hamas or Hezbollah are treated as permissible military targets, which is not only an overt violation of the most elementary norms of the law of war and of universal morality, but an avowal of a doctrine of violence that needs to be called by its proper name: state terrorism." An article published in June 2024 by the Global Health Justice project at the University of Washington argued that the doctrine is an intentional policy that conflicts with international humanitarian law.

== See also ==
- Collective punishment
- Dehousing
- Dignity taking
- Hannibal Directive
- International law and the Arab–Israeli conflict
- Responsibility to protect
