= Siboni =

Siboni is a surname. Notable people with the surname include:

- Daniel Siboni (born 1959), French photographer
- Gabi Siboni (born 1957), Israeli colonel
- Giuseppe Siboni (1780–1839), Italian operatic tenor, opera director, choir conductor, and voice teacher
- Marcello Siboni (born 1965), Italian racing cyclist
