= Daniel Sivan =

Israeli linguist (1949–2026)

- דניאל סיון
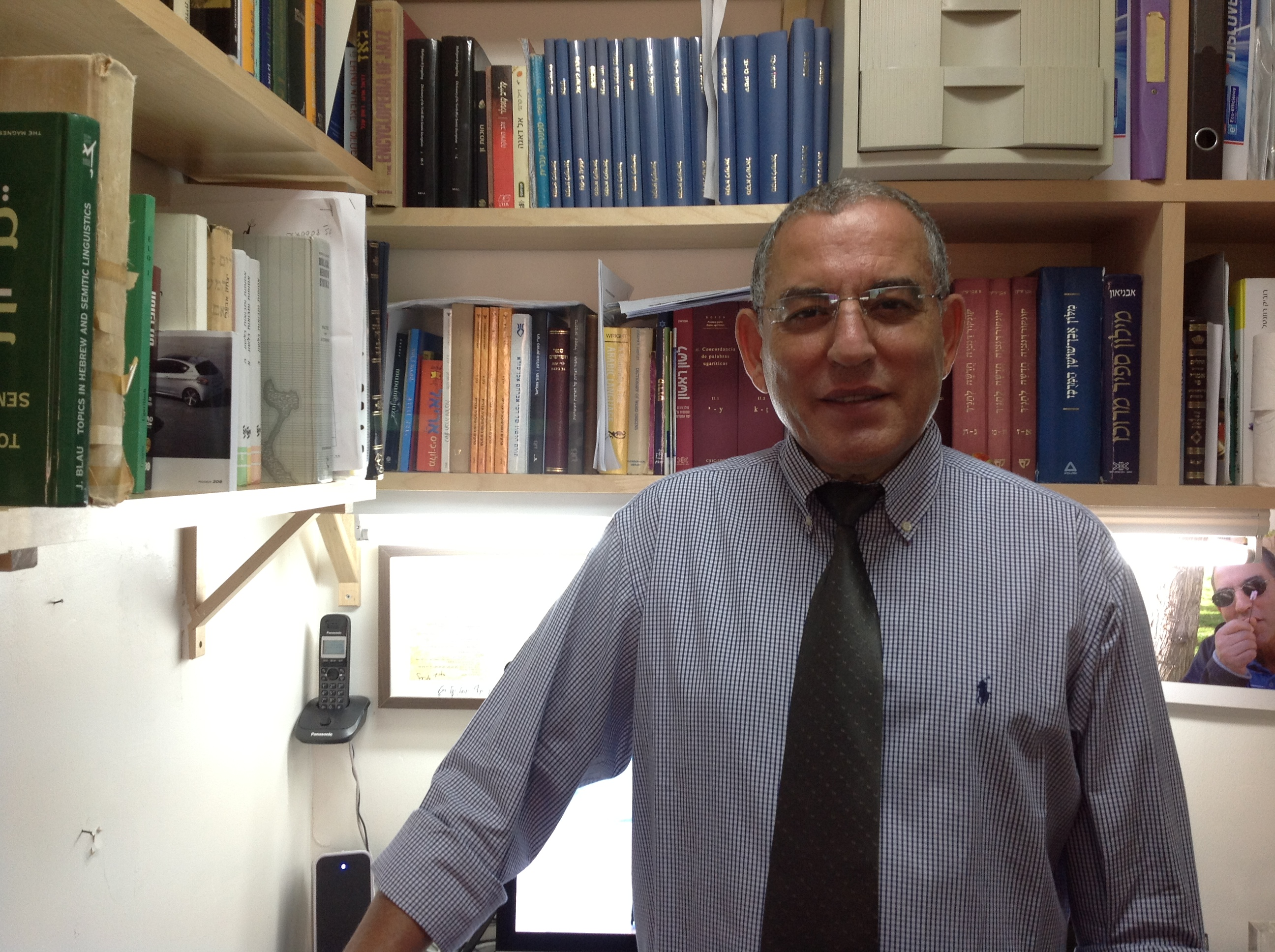
- Born: Daniel Sibboni; August 21, 1949; Casablanca, French protectorate of Morocco
- Died: August 6, 2026 (aged 76); Tel Aviv, Israel
- Education: Tel Aviv University _{B.A., M.A., PhD}
- Occupation: Professor
- Employer: Ben-Gurion University of the Negev

Daniel Sivan (Hebrew: דניאל סיון; August 21, 1949 – August 6, 2026) was an Israeli linguist and academic who was a professor in the Department of Hebrew Language at the Ben-Gurion University of the Negev.

== Background ==
Daniel Sibboni (later Sivan) was born in Casablanca, French protectorate of Morocco. He immigrated to Israel with his parents Makhluf and Allen and his two brothers Shmuel and Michel. When they arrived by ship from Marseille they were taken to Shikkun Canaan, a neighborhood in Safed. Sibboni's youngest brother, Gabi Siboni, was born there.

In August 1967, Sivan joined the Israel Defense Forces and became a coding instructor in the signals corps at Tzrifin.

Upon completing his military service, he moved to Ramat Gan and studied at the Tel Aviv University. He graduated with a Bachelor of Arts degree in Bible Studies and Hebrew Language in 1970. Continuing his studies, Sivan gained a Master of Arts degree in Hebrew and Semitic languages. His thesis focused on "Northwest Semitic in Akkadian texts from Ugarit" and was under the guidance of Professor Anson Frank Rainey. Sivan's thesis for his PhD degree, "Grammar of Northwestern Semitic Vocables in Akkadian Texts from the Land of Israel and Syria in the Middle Bronze Age", was written under the guidance of Professor Gideon Goldenberg and Professor Anson Frank Rainey.

From 2009 to 2011, Sivan broadcast a weekly jazz program on Radio Darom. He was a member of the band "Koah Meshikha" (Gravity) in which he played the guitar and sang blues and jazz songs with his brother, Gabi Siboni. After many years, Sivan quit the band, which changed its name to Jukebox.

Sivan was married (for the second time). He had three children with his first wife. His eldest son, Gal (aka James), was the drummer of the Shabak Samech band.

Sivan died on August 6, 2026, at the age of 76.

== Academic career ==
In October 1979 he was appointed a lecturer in the Department of Hebrew Language at Ben-Gurion University of the Negev, and in 1997 he became a full professor.

In 1986 and 1990, Sivan was a visiting professor at Harvard University and Brandeis University.

Between 2000 and 2004, Sivan held the position of Head of the Department of Hebrew Language and functioned as the Vice-Dean of the Faculty of Humanities and Social Sciences during the tenure of Dean Jimmy Weinblatt. From 1998 to 2013, Sivan was the chairman of Ben-Gurion University's publishing house, and during his tenure more than 150 titles were published.

From 2006 to 2010, Sivan was a member of the Ben-Gurion University Top Nominations Committee.

Collaborating with Professor Maya Fruchtman, Sivan edited the comprehensive "Ariel" dictionary, and together with Haim Dihi he co-authored the Ariel Aramic-Hebrew Dictionary. Both these dictionaries were published by Korim Publishing House.

== Awards and recognition ==
Sivan won several significant awards during his studies including the Mifal HaPayis award, the Nissim Gaon Award, and the Recanati Family Foundation Award. In 1995, together with Professor Haim Cohen, Sivan received an Honorary Award on behalf of the Israel Science Foundation.

== Fields of research ==
- The ancient Hebrew language (Biblical Hebrew and proto-biblical Hebrew)
- Northwestern Semitic tongues (Canaanite in Al-Amarna letter, Ugaritic language, Phoenician, and Punic, Hebrew inscriptions from the Biblical age, Ammonite inscriptions)
- Jewish grammarians of the Middle Ages (Hayyuj, Ibn Janah, etc.)

In his research work he focused mainly on the contribution of the languages to the understanding of biblical Hebrew. Among other things, he demonstrated how wrong it is to claim that Ugaritic was a Canaanite language. He demonstrated that Ugaritic had its own characteristic linguistic features, and accordingly it should be regarded as an independent language among the northwestern Semitic languages. It is a mistake to refer to its literature as "Canaanite literature," as some scholars such as Cassuto, Lionstam, and Avishur, have done.

Sivan studied the work of the grammarian Rabbi Yehuda Hayyuj. Sivan has written articles on some of the linguistic concepts in this work, and in 2012, together with Dr. Ali Wattad, he published an annotated, critical edition called "The Three Grammar Essays of Rabbi Yehuda Hayyuj in their Arabic Origin and their Translation to Modern Hebrew," published by Ben-Gurion University of the Negev publishing house.

== Published works ==
=== Hebrew ===
- 1993, D. Sivan, Ugaritic Language Grammar, Jerusalem
- 2011, Dr. Ali Wattad, Daniel Sivan, The Three Grammar Essays of Rabbi Yehuda Hayyuj in their Arabic Origin and their Translation to Modern Hebrew, a critical edition, Beersheba 5772 (2012)
- Daniel Sivan and Shmuel Ahituv, Sfat Kna'an [The Language of Canaan], Bialik Institute, 2026 (in Hebrew)

=== English ===
- 1983 (with) C. Cohen, The Ugaritic Hippiatric Texts: A Critical Edition, New Haven.
- 1984 Grammatical Analysis and Glossary of the Northwest Semitic Vocables in Akkadian Texts, Münster
- 1992 (with) Z. Cochavi-Rainey, West Semitic Vocabulary in Egyptian Script in the 14th–10th Centuries B.C.E.
- 1997 The Grammar of the Ugaritic Language, Leiden, New York, Köln

=== Edited books ===
- Tzippora Talshir, Shamir Yona, Daniel Sivan, A Gift to Shmuel: Studies of the Biblical World, Jerusalem
- 2003, Pablo-Itzhak Halevi-Kirtschok, Daniel Sivan, Voice of Jacob: A Collection of Essays for Prof. Jacob Ben-Tulila, Beersheba
- 2009, Daniel Sivan, David Talshir, Haim Cohen, Revealer of Secrets: Linguistic Studies Presented to Elisha Kimron for his Sixty-Fifth Birthday, Beersheba
