= Desmond Travers =

Irish Army colonel

- Military career
- Allegiance: Irish Army
- Service years: 1961-2001
- Rank: Colonel
- Other work: Director of Institute for International Criminal Investigations; Member of United Nations Fact Finding Mission on the Gaza Conflict

Desmond Travers (born 1941) is a retired Irish Army colonel. During his years with the army he served with various United Nations and European Union peacekeeping forces. Since his retirement from the army in 2001, he has taught military affairs at the Institute for International Criminal Investigations in The Hague. He also served on the institutes board of directors. In 2009 together with Richard Goldstone, Christine Chinkin, and Hina Jilani, he was appointed to the United Nations Fact Finding Mission on the Gaza Conflict. The report that the mission subsequently published is commonly referred to as the Goldstone Report and Travers is credited as one of the four co-authors.

== Irish Army ==
During his 42-year career as a soldier and officer with the Irish Army Infantry Corps, Travers served with the United Nations Peacekeeping Force in Cyprus (1964, 1969–70) and the United Nations Interim Force in Lebanon (1980–82, 1984–85 and 1987–88). While serving with UNIFIL, Travers and his family lived for two years in northern Israel. He subsequently served in Croatia (EU Monitor in 1993) and in Bosnia and Herzegovina (2000–01). His last army appointment was as Colonel, Commandant of the Military College, based at the Curragh Camp. He retired from the army in 2001.

== UN investigator ==
In 2003 Travers was invited join the Institute for International Criminal Investigations based in The Hague. He later became a director at the institute. In 2009 he was asked to participate in the United Nations Fact Finding Mission on the Gaza Conflict. The report was submitted to the Human Rights Council on September 30, 2009 and has come to be called “The Goldstone Report” after its chairman Richard Goldstone.

== Other Interests / Writer ==
Travers continues his interest in military history and heritage matters and is a member of the Military History Society of Ireland (MHSOI) and is a founder member of the Military Vehicle Club of Ireland (MVCI). He also writes and lectures on military and UN matters. He has written several essays for the Defence Forces Review. His most recent paper was "Soviet Military Mapping of Ireland During the Cold War".
