= Daniel Siboni =

French photographer and art director (born 1959)

- Born: June 2, 1959 (age 67); Rabat, Morocco
- Known for: Photography
- Notable work: Pink Woman, No Escape, Mohammed Ali
- Style: Fashion photography, street photography

Daniel Siboni (born June 2, 1959) is a French photographer whose work spans interior architecture, fashion photography, street art, and street photography.

== Career ==
Siboni's photography has been displayed at venues including the National Portrait Gallery, London and at In Fashion '07 during Art Basel Miami. In 2009, his work was included in the "Year of Fashion" exhibition organized by the Photography Institute of New York City.<ref>{{Cite web |title=World-Famous Photographer Daniel Siboni to Exhibit His Urbanik Art Concept Images at the Licensing Expo 2014 |url=https://www.prweb.com/releases/world_famous_photographer_daniel_
