= United Nations Fact Finding Mission on the Gaza Conflict =

Human rights commission

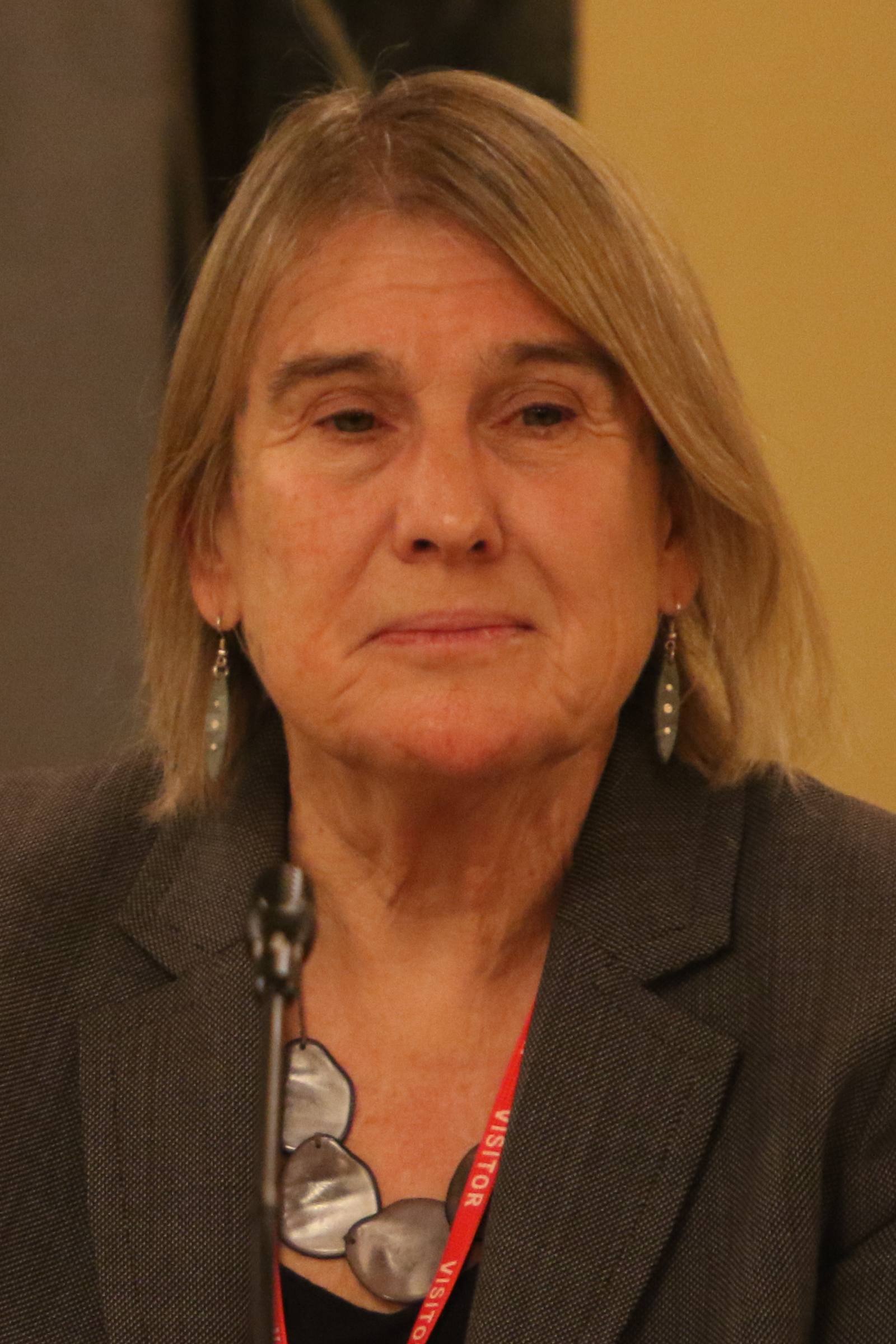

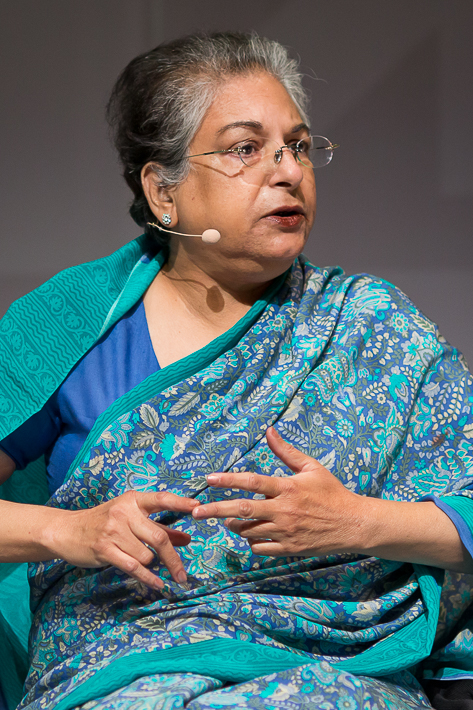

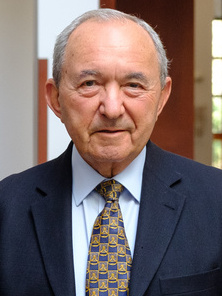

The authors: Goldstone, Jilani, and Chinkin

The United Nations Fact Finding Mission on the Gaza Conflict, also known as the Goldstone Report, was a United Nations fact-finding mission established in April 2009 pursuant to Resolution A/HRC/RES/S-9/1 of the United Nations Human Rights Council (UNHRC) of 12 January 2009, following the Gaza War as an independent international fact-finding mission "to investigate all violations of international human rights law and international humanitarian law by the occupying Power, Israel, against the Palestinian people throughout the Occupied Palestinian Territory, particularly in the occupied Gaza Strip, due to the current aggression". South African jurist Richard Goldstone was appointed to head the mission. The other co-authors of the Report were Hina Jilani, Christine Chinkin and Desmond Travers.

The Goldstone Report accused both the Israel Defense Forces and the Palestinian militants of war crimes and possible crimes against humanity. It recommended that each side openly investigate its own conduct, and to bring the allegations to the International Criminal Court if they failed to do so. The government of Israel rejected the report as prejudiced and full of errors, and also sharply rejected the charge that it had a policy of deliberately targeting civilians. The militant Islamic group Hamas initially rejected some of the report's findings, but then urged world powers to embrace it. Goldstone stated that the mission was not a judicial investigation, it was a fact-finding mission; the findings were "reasonable on weighing the evidence" but did not amount to "the criminal standard of proof beyond a reasonable doubt". The allegations were "a useful road map" for independent investigations by Israel and the Palestinians.

The report received wide support among countries in the United Nations, while Western countries were split between supporters and opponents of the resolutions endorsing the report. Critics of the report stated that it contained methodological failings, legal and factual errors, and falsehoods, and devoted insufficient attention to the allegations that Hamas was deliberately operating in heavily populated areas of Gaza.

The Report described the three weeks comprising the Gaza War as:

a deliberately disproportionate attack designed to punish, humiliate and terrorize a civilian population, radically diminish its local economic capacity both to work and to provide for itself, and to force upon it an ever increasing sense of dependency and vulnerability.

On 1 April 2011, Goldstone stated that recent Israeli investigations indicated that it was not Israeli government policy to deliberately target citizens. On 14 April 2011 the three other co-authors of the Report, Hina Jilani, Christine Chinkin and Desmond Travers, jointly criticized Goldstone's recantation. They all agreed that the report was valid and that Israel and Hamas had failed to investigate alleged war crimes satisfactorily.

== Mandate of mission ==
On 3 January 2009, in response to the Gaza War, the Organisation of the Islamic Conference's executive committee asked UNHRC to send a fact-finding mission to Gaza. On 12 January, UNHRC adopted Resolution S-9/1:

to dispatch an urgent, independent international fact-finding mission, to be appointed by the President of the Council, to investigate all violations of international human rights law and international humanitarian law by the occupying Power, Israel, against the Palestinian people throughout the Occupied Palestinian Territory, particularly in the occupied Gaza Strip, due to the current aggression, and calls upon Israel not to obstruct the process of investigation and to fully cooperate with the mission.

Mary Robinson, former United Nations High Commissioner for Human Rights, was asked by UNHRC President Martin Uhomoibhi to lead the Mission but expressed disappointment with the mandate and refused to head the Mission for that reason. She stated that the UNHRC resolution was one-sided and "guided not by human rights but by politics". She later expressed full support for the report.

Richard Goldstone initially refused the appointment for the same reason, calling the mandate "biased" and "uneven-handed". In January 2011, Goldstone said that UNHRC "repeatedly rush to pass condemnatory resolutions in the face of alleged violations of human rights law by Israel but fail to take similar action in the face of even more serious violations by other States. Until the Gaza Report they failed to condemn the firing of rockets and mortars at Israeli civilian centers". Following Goldstone's objection, the mandate was informally widened to cover activities by Palestinian militants as well, and the revised mandate, as quoted by the final report, became:

to investigate all violations of international human rights law and international humanitarian law that might have been committed at any time in the context of the military operations that were conducted in Gaza during the period from 27 December 2008 and 18 January 2009, whether before, during or after.

Speaking at Brandeis University, Goldstone noted that the widened mandate was presented by UNHRC President to a plenary session, where it did not encounter a single objection. He later described as "tiresome and inept" allegations made by U.S. Secretary of State Hillary Clinton that the mandate had not been broadened to cover violations by all parties. Despite Uhomoibhi's verbal commitment that there was no objection to the revised mandate, UNHRC never voted to revise the mandate, and resolution S-9/1 remained unchanged.

== Mission members ==
According to the mission's report, "The President appointed Justice Richard Goldstone, former judge of the Constitutional Court of South Africa and former Prosecutor of the International Criminal Tribunals for the former Yugoslavia and Rwanda, to head the Mission. The other three appointed members were: Christine Chinkin, Professor of International Law at the London School of Economics and Political Science, who took part in a fact-finding mission to Beit Hanoun in 2008; Hina Jilani, Advocate of the Supreme Court of Pakistan and a member of the International Commission of Inquiry on Darfur in 2004; and Desmond Travers, a former colonel in the Irish Defence Forces and member of the Board of Directors of the Institute for International Criminal Investigations."

Human Rights Watch (HRW) applauded the selection of Goldstone to head the mission, saying, "Justice Goldstone's reputation for fairness and integrity is unmatched, and his investigation provides the best opportunity to address alleged violations by both Hamas and Israel." Goldstone was a board member of HRW at that time, which HRW noted in its article. Gerald Steinberg of the Jerusalem-based NGO Monitor and journalist Melanie Phillips said that even though Goldstone resigned from HRW after the inquiry began, his impartiality was compromised by his link to an organization that accused Israel of war crimes.

In March 2009, Goldstone, Travers and Jilani signed an open letter to United Nations Secretary-General Ban Ki-moon and the United Nations Security Council, calling for those who perpetrated "gross violations of the laws of war", "gross violations of international humanitarian law" and "targeting of civilians" to be brought to account. The letter concluded: "The events in Gaza have shocked us to the core. Relief and reconstruction are desperately needed but, for the real wounds to heal, we must also establish the truth about crimes perpetuated against civilians on both sides." The chief rabbi of South Africa Warren Goldstein and Melanie Phillips asserted that this statement, made before the work of the mission has begun, violated provisions for impartiality of the fact-finding missions. Mary Robinson called Goldstone "a dedicated and unimpeachable human rights lawyer and advocate" who "was able to work with the [Human Rights] Council's president to secure an agreement that he felt confident would permit the mandate to be interpreted in such a way as to allow his team to address the actions taken by both parties to the conflict".

In January 2009, before her appointment to the mission, Christine Chinkin co-signed a letter published in the Sunday Times describing Israel's military offensive in Gaza as "an act of aggression". The letter also stated that the firing of rockets by Hamas into Israel and suicide bombings are "contrary to international humanitarian law and are war crimes". Critics, among them Howard L. Berman, said that Chinkin should have been disqualified to preserve the impartiality of the mission. In August 2009, NGO UN Watch submitted a petition to the UN, calling for Chinkin's disqualification. In May 2009, Chinkin denied the charges, saying that her statement only addressed jus ad bellum, and not jus in bello."

The inquiry members said that the mission investigated whether Israel, Hamas or the Palestinian Authority had unnecessarily harmed innocent civilians, stating "On those issues the letter co-signed by Chinkin expressed no view at all." The members wrote that the fact-finding mission was not a judicial or even a quasi-judicial proceeding. Hillel Neuer, director of UN Watch, said that the basic standards for international fact-finding missions had been ignored. Goldstone agreed that the letter could have been the grounds for disqualification if the mission had been a judicial inquiry. Two groups, a group of UK lawyers and academics, and a group of Canadian lawyers, said they supported the UN Watch request that Chinkin be disqualified and expressed disappointment that it was rejected.

== Investigation ==
The mission convened on 4 May in Geneva and during a week-long session held meetings with UN Member States, NGOs and representatives of the UN. By the end of the session, the mission established its methodology and a three-month program of work. The mission issued a press release on 8 May describing the mandate, progress and plans. Goldstone stated that the focus of the investigation would be on "an objective and impartial analysis of compliance of the parties to the conflict with their obligations under international human rights and humanitarian law, especially their responsibility to ensure the protection of civilians and non-combatants," adding "I believe that an objective assessment of the issues is in the interests of all parties, will promote a culture of accountability and could serve to promote greater peace and security in the region."

On 8 June, the mission invited "all interested persons and organizations to submit relevant information and documentation that will assist in the implementation of the Mission's mandate". Submissions were to focus on "events and conduct that occurred in the context of the armed conflict that took place between 27 December 2008 and 19 January 2009" and that "for the purposes of its mandate, events since June 2008 are particularly relevant to the conflict."

The mission conducted two field visits to Gaza, entering through the Rafah Border Crossing from Egypt after access through Israel was denied. The first visit, on 1–5 June 2009, included a tour of the sites and interviews with victims and witnesses. Investigations continued during the second visit, from 26 June to 1 July, with public hearings. In the course of the investigation, the committee conducted 188 interviews, reviewed 10,000 pages of documents and inspected 1,200 photographs.

Israel refused to cooperate with the investigation, citing anti-Israel bias in the UNHRC and the mission's one-sided founding resolution. Israel also stated that the mission would be unable to question Palestinian militants who fired rockets at Israel. The team was denied access to military sources, and entrance to Gaza via Israel.

According to Western media reports, Hamas was very cooperative; nevertheless, Goldstone pointed out that in some areas of information the committee did not receive full cooperation from the Palestinians. It was also reported that the team had been escorted by Hamas minders who could have intimidated witnesses. Goldstone dismissed these allegations as "baseless".

At the end of a four-day trip, the head of the team expressed shock at the scale of destruction. Goldstone announced that the team would hold public hearings with the war's victims later in June, in Gaza and Geneva. Alex Whiting, a professor at Harvard law school, said cases like the one being probed by the UN inquiry team are hard to investigate, especially without military records.

In the morning session of 6 July, Israeli witnesses and representatives testified in front of the committee, describing years of living under rocket attack. The last to take the floor during the session was Noam Shalit, father of the Israeli captive soldier Gilad Shalit who at that time had been imprisoned in Gaza for three years, with no visit by the Red Cross permitted. Later that day, pro-Palestinian witnesses and experts from Israel and the West Bank testified. The next day, a military expert testified on weapons use by Hamas and Israel and an international law expert testified at Goldstone's Gaza hearings. Following the two-day session, Goldstone said that the investigation entered its final phase, but that it was too soon to conclude that war crimes were committed.

Israeli lawyer Charles Abelsohn criticized the objectivity of the committee members, citing Travers who said during the public hearings that "there have been instances of the shooting of children in front of their parents. As an ex-soldier I find that kind of action to be very, very strange and very unique", asking the witness to comment on those insights.

The commission's report states that during and after the investigation, several Palestinians cooperating with the Mission were detained by Israeli security forces. One of them was Muhammad Srour, a member of the Popular Committee Against the Wall in Nilin, who testified before the Mission in Geneva; en route back to West Bank he was arrested. After UN intervention, he was released. Israeli security sources said that Sruor was detained for questioning on suspicion that he was involved in terror activity and that his visit to Geneva had no bearing on the arrest. Another witness, Shawan Jabarin, General Director of the Palestinian human-rights organisation Al Haq, had to be heard by videoconference, as he has been subject to a travel ban by Israel since 2006 preventing him from leaving the West Bank on the grounds that he is a senior member of the Popular Front for the Liberation of Palestine.

== Report ==
On 15 September 2009, a 574-page report was released. The report concluded that the Israel Defense Forces (IDF) and Palestinian militant groups had committed war crimes and possibly crimes against humanity. While the report condemned violations by both sides, it differentiated between the moral and legal severity of the violations of the Israeli forces compared to those of Hamas and other Palestinian armed groups. These differentiators included 'grave breaches of the Fourth Geneva Convention committed by Israeli forces in Gaza; wilful killing, torture or inhuman treatment, willfully causing great suffering or serious injury to body or health, and extensive destruction of property, not justified by military necessity and carried out unlawfully and wantonly'. (Note: Specifically, one of the most serious findings the report concluded with regard to actions in Gaza: 1732. From the facts gathered, the Mission found that the following grave breaches of the Fourth Geneva Convention were committed by Israeli forces in Gaza: wilful killing, torture or inhuman treatment, willfully causing great suffering or serious injury to body or health, and extensive destruction of property, not justified by military necessity and carried out unlawfully and wantonly. As grave breaches these acts give rise to individual criminal responsibility. The Mission notes that the use of human shields also constitutes a war crime under the Rome Statute of the International Criminal Court.)

== Accusations against Israel ==
=== Blockade of Gaza allegations ===
The report stated that the blockade constituted a violation of Israel's obligations as an occupying power in Gaza.

=== Civilian targeting allegations ===
The report disputes Israel's claim that the Gaza war would have been conducted as a response to rockets fired from the Gaza Strip, saying that at least in part the war was targeted against the "people of Gaza as a whole". Intimidation against the population was seen as an aim of the war. (Note: 1680. The Gaza military operations were, according to the Israeli Government, thoroughly and extensively planned. While the Israeli Government has sought to portray its operations as essentially a response to rocket attacks in the exercise of its right to self defence, the Mission considers the plan to have been directed, at least in part, at a different target: the people of Gaza as a whole.) The report also says that Israel's military assault on Gaza was designed to "humiliate and terrorize a civilian population, radically diminish its local economic capacity both to work and to provide for itself, and to force upon it an ever increasing sense of dependency and vulnerability".

The report focused on 36 cases that it said constituted a representative sample. In 11 of these episodes, it said the Israeli military carried out direct attacks against civilians, including some in which civilians were shot "while they were trying to leave their homes to walk to a safer place, waving white flags". Talking to Bill Moyers Journal, Goldstone said that the committee chose 36 incidents that represented the highest death toll, where there seemed to be little or no military justification for what happened. According to the report, another alleged war crime committed by IDF include "wanton" destruction of food production, water and sewerage facilities; the report also asserts that some attacks, which were supposedly aimed to kill small number of combatants amidst significant numbers of civilians, were disproportionate.

The report concluded that Israel violated the Fourth Geneva Convention by targeting civilians, which it labeled "a grave breach". It also claimed that the violations were "systematic and deliberate", which placed the blame in the first place on those who designed, planned, ordered and oversaw the operations. The report recommended, inter alia, that Israel pay reparations to Palestinians living in Gaza for property damage caused during the conflict.

=== Ibrahim al-Maqadma Mosque missile strike ===
The report stated that the January 3, 2009 strike on the al-Maqadmah mosque on the outskirts of Jabilyah occurred when between 200 and 300 men and women attended for their evening prayer, with 15 people being killed and 40 wounded as a result of the attack. The Mission has established that the Israeli armed forces fired a missile that struck near the doorway of the mosque. The Mission found that the mosque was damaged and lodged in its interior walls with "small metal cubes", several of which were retrieved by the Mission when it inspected the site. The Mission concluded that the mosque had been hit by an air-to-ground missile fitted with a shrapnel fragmentation sleeve, fired from an aircraft. The Mission based its findings on investigation of the site, photographs and interviewing witnesses. The Mission found no indications that the mosque was used to launch rockets, store munitions or shelter combatants. The Mission also found that no other damage was done in the area at the time, making the attack an isolated incident. The Mission concluded that the Israelis intentionally bombed the mosque. Judge Goldstone said: "Assuming that weapons were stored in the mosque, it would not be a war crime to bomb it at night... It would be a war crime to bomb it during the day when 350 people are praying." He further added that there is no other possible interpretation for what could have occurred other than a deliberate targeting of civilians. The report also reproduces a statement from the Israeli government concerning the attack, where the Israeli government both denies that the mosque was attacked and states that the casualties of the attack were Hamas operatives. The report says that the position of the Israeli government contains "apparent contradictions" and is "unsatisfactory" and "demonstrably false".

=== Zeitoun killings ===
According to interviews with family members, neighbors, Palestinian Red Crescent personnel, submissions from various NGOs and visits to the site, the extended al-Samouni family gathered together in one house after the fighting in the area was over, ordered there by Israeli soldiers patrolling their Gaza neighborhood of Zeitoun as part of the ground phase of the Gaza War; when five men stepped out of the house to collect firewood, a missile struck them, fired, possibly, from an Apache helicopter; several more missiles followed, this time aimed directly at the house. In all, 21 family members were killed, including women and children. When the surviving al-Samounis attempted to leave and make their way to Gaza City, they were told by an Israeli soldier to return to the house. In April 2011, Goldstone wrote that the shelling of the home was apparently the consequence of an Israeli commander's erroneous interpretation of a drone image.

=== Al-Fakhura school incident ===
The report says that IDF's mortar shelling near a United Nations-run Al-Fakhura school in the Jabaliya refugee camp, which was sheltering some 1,300 people, killed 35 and wounded up to 40 people. The investigation did not exclude the possibility that Israeli forces were responding to fire from an armed Palestinian group, as Israel said, but said that this and similar attacks "cannot meet the test of what a reasonable commander would have determined to be an acceptable loss of civilian life for the military advantage sought". The mission criticized IDF for the choice of the weapons for the supposed counterstrike and concluded that the IDF fire at the Al-Fakhura street violated the law of proportionality.

In 2012 Israeli officials acknowledged that contrary to earlier claims, no rockets were fired from schools operated by the United Nations Relief and Works Agency for Palestine Refugees (UNRWA) during the Gaza war.

=== Abd Rabbo family incident ===
According to the Mission's report, the committee found Khaled and Kawthar Abd Rabbo to be credible and reliable witnesses and it had no reason to doubt the veracity of the main elements of their testimony, which it says is consistent with the accounts it received from other eyewitnesses and NGOs. The report concludes that the Israeli soldiers deliberately shot at the family members, as they could not perceive any danger from the house, its occupants or the surroundings. The report bases its conclusion on the premise that the family, consisting of a man, a young and an elderly woman and three small girls, some of them waving white flags, stepped out of the house and stood still for several minutes waiting for instructions from the soldiers.

=== White phosphorus allegations ===
The report says that Israeli forces were "systematically reckless" in determining the use of white phosphorus in built-up areas. The writers highlighted the Israeli attack on the UN Relief and Works Agency compound in Gaza City on 15 January, the attack on the Al Quds hospital, and the attack on the Al Wafa hospital, each of which involved using white phosphorus. They described its use as disproportionate or excessive under international law. More generally, the UN report recommended that "serious consideration should be given to banning the use of white phosphorus in built-up areas".

=== Human shields allegations ===
The report also accused Israel of using Palestinians as "human shields" and torturing detainees. The human shields accusations were supported in 2010, with Israel charging two soldiers with forcing a 9-year-old Palestinian boy to open bags suspected of containing bombs.

== Accusations against Palestinian militants ==
The report also stated there is evidence that Palestinian armed groups committed war crimes and possibly crimes against humanity by deliberately launching rockets and firing mortars into Israel, calculated to kill civilians and damage civilian structures. The report accused Palestinian armed groups of causing psychological trauma to the civilians within the range of the rockets. It also concluded that killings and abuses of members of the Fatah political movement amount to a "serious violation of human rights".

The Mission, however, found no evidence of Palestinian armed groups placing civilians in areas where attacks were being launched; of engaging in combat in civilian dress; or of using a mosque for military purposes or to shield military activities. This statement contrasted with media reports that Hamas fighters wore civilian clothes and concealed their weapons. In March 2009, the Intelligence and Terrorism Information Center (Malam) published a report that included material supplied by the IDF and Shin Bet (Israel Security Agency) as part of an effort to counter the Goldstone Report. It included videos and photographs reportedly showing that "dozens of mosques that were used by Hamas to store weapons, functioned as command centers or whose grounds were used to fire rockets into Israel."

While discussing an obligation of Palestinian armed groups to protect the civilian population in Gaza, the report notes that those interviewed in Gaza appeared reluctant to speak about the presence of or conduct of hostilities by the Palestinian armed groups. The Mission does not discount that the interviewees' reluctance may have stemmed from a fear of reprisals. The report also criticized the treatment of captured Israeli soldier Gilad Shalit, and called for his release.

== Reactions ==
=== Israel ===
The Israeli government issued an initial 32-point formal response to the fact-finding mission's report on 24 September 2009. The response listed a series of what it argued were serious flaws and biases in the report, finally concluding that the report perverts international law to serve a political agenda. (See below.)

Also in October 2009, Israel pressured the Palestinian president to postpone asking for a UN vote on the Goldstone report. Yuval Diskin, head of the Israeli Shin Bet security service, met in Ramallah with President Mahmud Abbas and informed him that if Abbas refuses to ask to postpone the UN vote on the Goldstone report then Israel will turn the West Bank into a "second Gaza": the Shin Bet chief told Abbas that if he did not ask for a deferral of the vote, Israel would withdraw permission for mobile phone company Wataniya to operate in the Palestinian Authority and threatened to revoke the easing of restrictions on movement within the West Bank that had been implemented earlier in 2009.

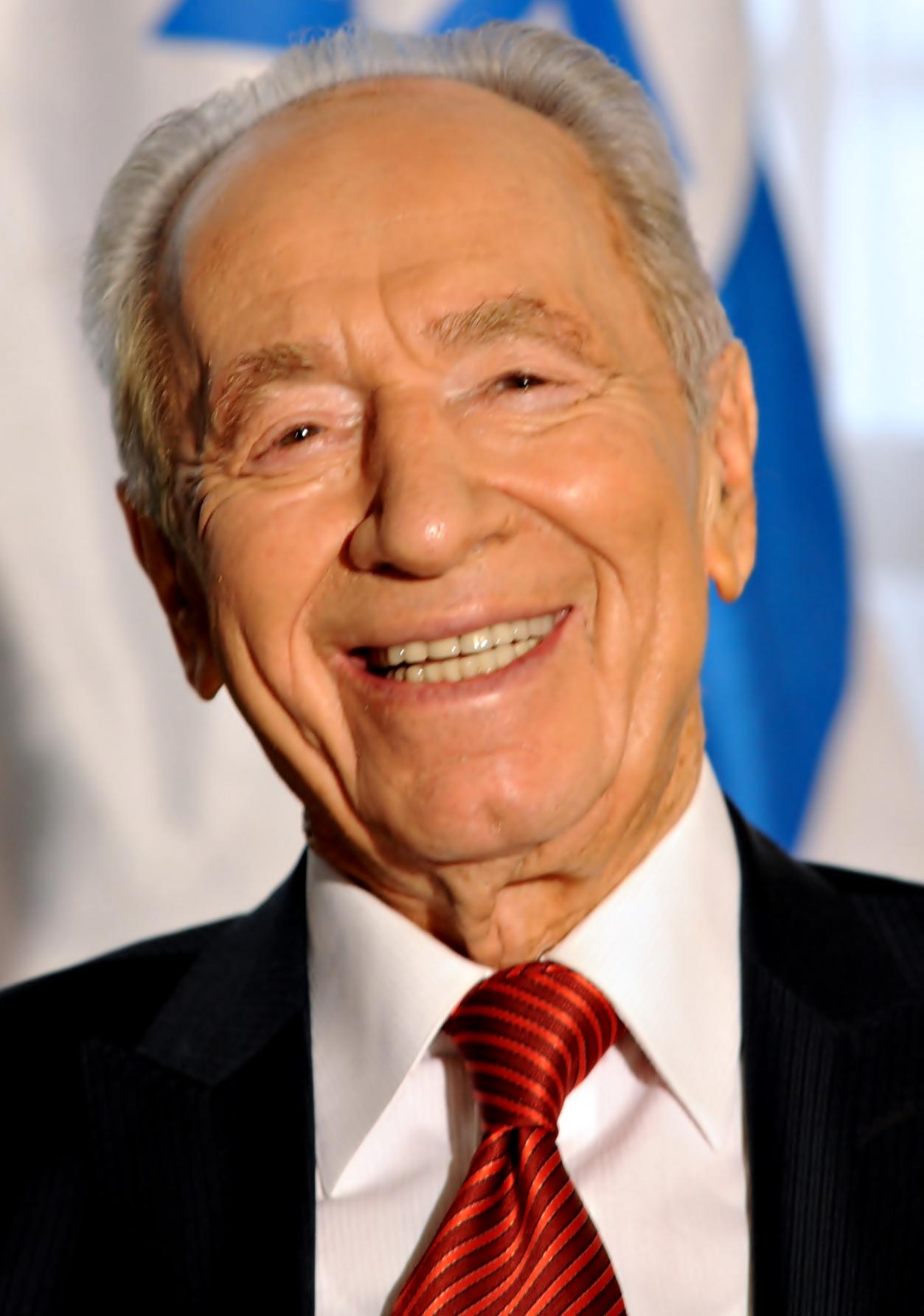
Israeli President Shimon Peres said the mission's report "makes a mockery of history".

Israeli President Shimon Peres said that the report "makes a mockery of history" and that "it does not distinguish between the aggressor and the defender. War is crime and the attacker is the criminal. The defender has no choice. The Hamas terror organization is the one who started the war and also carried out other awful crimes. Hamas has used terrorism for years against Israeli children." Peres also stated that "the report gives de facto legitimacy to terrorist initiatives and ignores the obligation and right of every country to defend itself, as the UN itself had clearly stated." He added that the report "Failed to supply any other way for Hamas fire to stop. The IDF's operations have boosted the West Bank's economy, liberated Lebanon from Hezbollah terror and allowed Gazans to resume normalcy. The Israeli government withdrew (from Gaza) and Hamas began a murderous rampage, firing thousands of shells on women and children – innocent civilians, instead of rebuilding Gaza and caring for the population's welfare. (Hamas) builds tunnels and used civilians and children to shield terrorists and hide weapons."

Israeli Prime Minister Benjamin Netanyahu said: "The Goldstone Report is a field court-martial, and its findings were prewritten. This is a prize for terror. The report makes it difficult for democracies to fight terror." On another occasion, Netanyahu said that the report ignored Israel's 2005 withdrawal from Gaza and the Palestinian rocket attacks that preceded the war. He also warned world leaders that they and their anti-terror forces could be targets for charges similar to those in the report. At the United Nations General Assembly, Netanyahu called the report biased and unjust, asking: "Will you stand with Israel or will you stand with the terrorists? We must know the answer to that question now. Only if we have the confidence that we can defend ourselves can we take further risks for peace."

Israeli Foreign Minister Avigdor Lieberman said: "The Goldstone Commission is a commission established with the aim of finding Israel guilty of crimes ahead of time, [the commission] was dispatched by countries in which the terms 'human rights' and 'combat ethics' are unknown" He added that "the IDF was forced to deal with the lowest form of terrorists that set themselves the goal of killing women and children [by] hiding behind women and children. The state of Israel will continue to protect its citizens from the attacks of the terrorists and the terror organizations, and will continue to protect its soldiers from hypocritical and distorted attacks."

==== Preliminary analysis by Israel ====
The Government of Israel issued a 32-point preliminary analysis of the report, titled "Initial Response to Report of the Fact Finding Mission on Gaza Established Pursuant to Resolution S-9/1 of the Human Rights Council". The main arguments in the analysis were the following.

1. The resolution mandating the mission was one-sided and prejudicial and the terms of the mandate were never changed.
2. The composition of the Mission and its conduct raised serious questions about its impartiality.
3. Incidents selected for examination were cherry-picked for political effect.
4. The mission displayed double standards in acceptance of evidence: treating even photographic evidence presented by Israel as inherently untrustworthy, except when it could be used to condemn Israel, while uncritically accepting statements by Hamas; reinterpreting or dismissing self-incriminating statements by Hamas; and selectively quoting material from sources.
5. The report includes misstatements of fact: for example, it stated that Israel discriminated against its non-Jewish citizens in providing shelter from Palestinian rocket attacks, when the shelter was provided on the basis of proximity to the Gaza Strip and did not discriminate between Jews and non-Jews.
6. The report contains misstatements of law: for example, its description of the Israeli appeals process is outdated.
7. The report fails to consider the military complexities of the war, makes judgments lacking necessary knowledge, and ignores Israel's extensive efforts to maintain humanitarian standards and protect civilians.
8. The report unjustifiably minimizes the threat of terrorism and in effect vindicates terrorist tactics.
9. The report presents its findings as judicial determinations of guilt, despite its admission that it does not reach a judicial level of proof; it commits egregious legal errors, including unjustifiable assumptions regarding intent and commanders' states of mind, as well as misinterpretation of the willfulness requirement of responsibility under international law.
10. The report ignores Israel's own investigations into its conduct, overlooks the many independent levels of scrutiny in Israel's judicial system, misrepresents Israel's legal mechanisms and shows disdain for democratic values.
11. The report makes one-sided recommendations against Israel while making only token recommendations with respect to Palestinians: for example, recommending Israel compensate Palestinians for attacks without recommending Palestinians compensate Israelis for attacks.

The analysis concludes that the report claims to represent international law but perverts it to serve a political agenda; that it sends a "legally unfounded message to states everywhere confronting terrorism that international law has no effective response to offer them", and that it signals to terrorist groups "that the cynical tactics of seeking to exploit civilian suffering for political ends actually pays dividends".

=== Palestinian National Authority ===
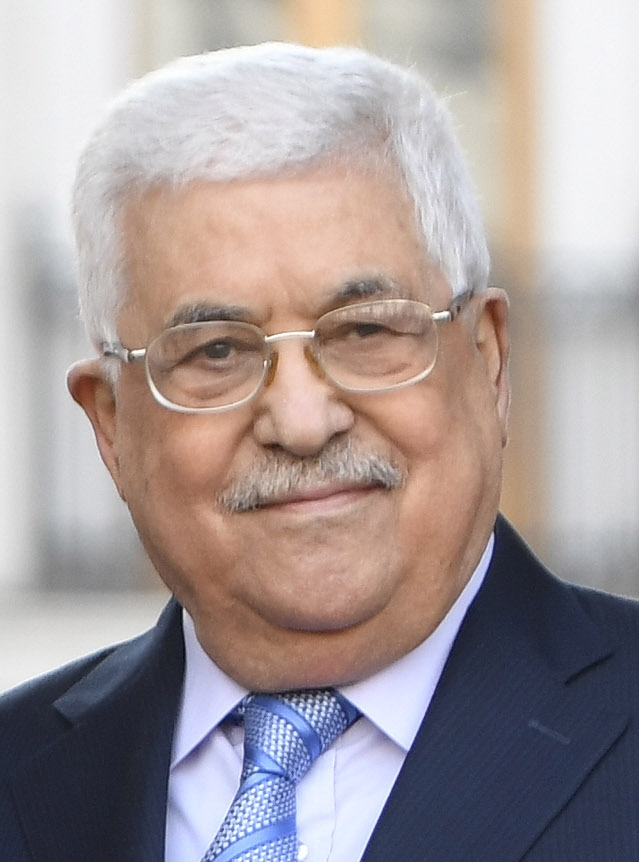
Palestinian President Mahmoud Abbas

Following the postponing of the vote on the resolution in UNHRC, the Palestinian National Authority came under heavy criticism for agreeing to defer the draft proposal endorsing all recommendations of the UN Fact Finding Mission. Several Palestinian human rights organizations, condemning the PA's action, issued a statement under the title "Justice Delayed is Justice Denied". Abbas agreed to postpone the vote on the Goldstone report following a confrontational meeting with Yuval Diskin, head of the Israeli Shin Bet security service. Palestinian Authority President Mahmoud Abbas announced on 4 October that a new committee would be established in order to investigate the circumstances surrounding the deferral of the UN vote on the Goldstone Report. Hamas officials in Gaza demanded Abu Mazen's resignation for supporting the postponement of the vote at the UN Human Rights Council. Mahmoud al-Zahar said that Abbas was guilty of "a very big crime against the Palestinian people" over the PA's conduct at UNHRC.

Palestinian representative to the United Nations Ibrahim Khraishi called the report unbiased and professionally compiled. He further added, "This report was important; what bothered some parties was that the report simply monitored international law, international humanitarian law and all relevant international instruments. This was not a political instrument that supported Palestine or Israel." He added the report was the first time killings of Palestinian civilians have been documented, and that his people would not forgive if those responsible were not punished.

Eleven Palestinian human rights organizations, including two based in Israel, called on the Palestinian Authority and the Hamas government in Gaza to investigate Palestinian violations of international law allegedly committed during the Gaza War. Alleged violations include Palestinian attacks on civilians in Israel and instances of internal repression, such as summary executions in the Gaza Strip and arrests and torture in the West Bank. The letter asked to launch investigations before the 5 February deadline. The authors of the call said that for PLO efforts to have the report endorsed by the UN to be of lasting value, the Palestinian authorities must take action to implement its recommendations.

=== United Nations ===
The UN high commissioner for human rights, Navi Pillay, endorsed the report and supported the call on Israel and Hamas to investigate and prosecute those who committed war crimes. UN Secretary General Ban Ki-moon urged "credible" investigations by both sides into the conduct of the Gaza conflict "without delay".

=== Governments and regional organizations ===
==== United States ====
Ambassador Susan Rice, the U.S. permanent representative to the UN, said: "We have very serious concerns about many recommendations in the report" State Department spokesman Ian Kelly said: "Although the report covers both sides of the conflict, it focuses overwhelmingly on Israel's actions," adding that Goldstone opted for "cookie cutter conclusions" about Israel's actions, while keeping "the deplorable actions of Hamas to generalized remarks". The United States pledged to stand by Israel in the fight against the Goldstone report. U.S. Ambassador Alejandro Wolff told the Security Council that whereas the U.S. had "serious concerns" about the report's "unbalanced focus on Israel, the overly broad scope of its recommendations and its sweeping conclusions of law, it also took the allegations in the report seriously and encouraged Israel to conduct serious investigations.

A presidential advisor on Middle East policy told a group of American Jewish leaders in November 2010 that the U.S. government was committed to curbing actions by the UN on the Goldstone Report.

Representatives Shelley Berkley of Nevada and Eliot Engel of New York wrote in a joint statement: "Israel took every reasonable step to avoid civilian casualties ... It is ridiculous to claim that Israel did not take appropriate actions to protect civilian populations."

Perceived unwillingness on the part of the United States to act on the report was criticized by the Non-Aligned Movement (NAM), which represents 118 nations, the Center for Constitutional Rights, Stephen Zunes, professor of politics and international studies at the University of San Francisco, and Human Rights Watch. Naomi Klein stated that instead of proving its commitment to international law, the United States is smearing the "courageous" report.

===== House of Representatives resolution =====
On 3 November 2009, the House of Representatives overwhelmingly passed a resolution, H. Res. 867 (344 for, 36 against), calling the report irredeemably biased and unworthy of further consideration or legitimacy. Howard Berman, one of the cosponsors of the resolution, expressed several concerns:

*The commission's report lacks context. It does not take account of the nature of Israel's enemy – operating from the midst of civilian populations, committed to Israel's destruction, and fully supported by state actors Iran and Syria.

*The report does not take into account the extent to which witnesses from Gaza were likely intimidated by Hamas.

*In general, the report is credulous of Hamas claims but skeptical of Israeli claims.

Goldstone and several U.S.-based rights groups denounced the resolution. Sarah Leah Whitson, a director of Middle East and North Africa Division of Human Rights Watch, commented that "this sort of resolution sends a terrible message to the international community about American willingness to believe in international justice for all. I hope that the members of Congress reject it. It's funny because it accuses the Goldstone Report of being one sided but it's not. It's this resolution that's one-sided and biased." HRW also maintained that the House resolution "has factual errors and would help shield from justice the perpetrators of serious abuses – both Israeli and Palestinian".

==== Europe ====
- (European Union) The European Parliament passed a resolution endorsing the Goldstone report in March 2010. The resolution called on the bloc's member states to "publicly demand the implementation of [the report's] recommendations and accountability for all violations of international law, including alleged war crimes".
- (France) The French foreign ministry called the facts revealed by the report "extremely serious" and deserving of utmost attention. The French UN Ambassador Gérard Araud urged both sides to initiate "independent inquiries in line with international standards".
- Talking to Israeli television Channel 2, Spanish Prime Minister José Luis Rodríguez Zapatero said that in any event, Spain would not seek to prosecute Israelis for alleged war crimes.
- Sweden's foreign minister Carl Bildt said he supported the report, and called Israel's refusal to cooperate with the investigation a mistake. Bildt characterized Goldstone as a person with high integrity and credibility, and called his report worthy of consideration. At the time of Bildt's statement, Sweden held the rotating Presidency of the Council of the European Union.
- At the UNHRC, Switzerland commented favourably on the impartiality of the findings in the 575-page report. The Swiss ambassador called on Israel and Hamas to conduct independent investigations into the allegations of war crimes. He also called for an independent expert panel to oversee legal procedures on both sides.
- Turkey, which held a seat in the Security Council until the end of 2010, has voiced support for discussing the report to the Security Council. Turkish prime minister Tayyip Erdoğan called for "accountability" and said that guilty parties should be identified and face necessary sanctions. He also accused Israel of raining "phosphorus bombs ... on innocent children in Gaza".
- (United Kingdom) In an interview with an Israeli radio station, the British Ambassador to the United Nations, John Sawers, supported the findings of the report and called for both Israel and the Palestinians to investigate its conclusions. During the UN Security Council's meeting, he said, "the Goldstone Report itself did not adequately recognize Israel's right to protect its citizens, nor did it pay sufficient attention to Hamas's actions." Nevertheless, he further stressed the concerns raised in the report, which he said cannot be ignored. In October 2009 it was reported saying that Ehud Olmert, Israeli prime minister during the conflict, would "probably" face arrest should he visit the UK.
- (Netherlands) Dutch foreign minister Maxime Verhagen said both Israel and the Palestinian Authority must investigate war crimes allegations, saying "there can be no impunity for serious human rights violations both on the Palestinian and the Israeli side". Verhagen also urged Israel to halt building settlements in the West Bank, calling the practice a serious obstacle to peace, which "will have to stop".
- As reported in Haaretz in April 2011, Labor Party Secretary-General Hilik Bar said that Norway's Foreign Minister Jonas Gahr Støre told him that Norway will reconsider their support for the report in light of Goldstone's recantation.

==== Asia and Africa ====
- A Foreign Ministry spokesman said China had voted in favor of the report "in the hope of protecting the human rights of the people in the occupied Palestinian territories and to promote the resumption of Israeli-Palestinian peace process." Chinese members of parliament told a visiting delegation of the Israeli Parliament officials in Beijing that China will oppose discussing the Goldstone Commission's report at the UN Security Council and allowing the document to serve as a basis for lawsuits against Israel at the International Criminal Court in the Hague. The Chinese parliamentarians stressed that the UNHRC had the necessary tools to look into the report without the involvement of other institutions.
- Manouchehr Mottaki, Iran's foreign minister, referred to the report when calling for legal action against the Israeli leadership saying, "The perpetrators of the Gaza war should stand before [an] international war crimes tribunal."
- (Nigeria) The Nigerian ambassador to the UNHRC, Martin Ihoeghian Uhomoibhi, said that he Council should not dilute its efforts by vilifying the Fact-Finding Mission members and parts of the report – no useful purpose would be served by compounding the human rights situation in the region through sheer rhetoric or failure to act. He said, "The implementation of the report was crucial to addressing the pernicious issues of impunity and accountability".

==== Organizations ====
- The Arab League called for implementation of the recommendations and Secretary General Amr Moussa stressed its commitment to closely following up the situation and assuring implementation of Goldstone's recommendations to "prevent future assaults".
- (Organisation of Islamic Cooperation) On behalf of the Organisation of the Islamic Conference (OIC), Pakistani Ambassador Zamir Akram welcomed the fact-finding mission and thanked them for presenting a comprehensive and objective account. Discussing responding to allegations of war crimes, he said, "it was now the time for action; words needed to be converted into deeds."
- (United Nations) Speaking in the UNHRC, numerous states called the report "balanced".
- Speaking on behalf of the Non-Aligned Movement (NAM), Egyptian Ambassador Hisham Badr welcomed the report, saying that those responsible for crimes should be brought to justice and called for an end to a "situation of impunity and defiance of the law".

=== Non-government organizations ===
Amnesty International stated that Goldstone's findings were consistent with those of Amnesty's own field investigation, and called on the UN to implement the recommendations. Human Rights Watch called the report a significant step toward justice and redress for the victims on both sides, and called on the Security Council to implement the report's recommendations.

Israeli human rights group B'Tselem, along with eight other Israeli human-rights NGOs, stated that they "expect the Government of Israel to respond to the substance of the report's findings and to desist from its current policy of casting doubt upon the credibility of anyone who does not adhere to the establishment's narrative". At the same time, leaders of B'Tselem and Breaking the Silence think that the Goldstone accusation of an assault on civilians is incorrect. The executive director of B'Tselem criticized some aspects of the report, particularly "very careful phrasing regarding Hamas abuses", such as lack of condemnation of mosques' misuses or human shielding, as well as supposedly sweeping conclusions regarding Israel. Yael Stein, research director of B'Tselem, said that she does not accept the Goldstone conclusion of a systematic attack on civilian infrastructure, which she found unconvincing. At the same time, she urged to check out every incident and every policy by an independent body, because in her view the military cannot check itself and it has to be explained why so many people had been killed.

The European Centre for Law and Justice (ECLJ) – the international affiliate of the American Center for Law and Justice – claimed in its analyses of the Report that among numerous flaws in it, the Mission misstated the International Humanitarian Law regarding the obligation of the fighters engaged in hostilities to distinguish themselves from the civilian population by uniform (perfidy violation per Article 37 of the Protocol I).

UN Watch criticized Goldstone's report methodologies that allegedly dismissed or ignored much of the evidence provided in Israeli Government report from July 2009 on the one hand and on the other hand endorsed unquestionably testimonies by Gaza officials. Representatives of Simon Wiesenthal Center made similar charges.

=== Journalism ===
The Financial Times (UK) called the report balanced and criticized attacks on Goldstone. It argued, however, that Israeli objections to the UNHRC were on strong ground, stating, "council members from Libya to Angola hide behind the Palestinian cause to deflect attention from their own records of serious human rights abuse."

The Independent wrote that Israel should open a parliamentary investigation after the model of the Kahan Commission to look into its actions in Gaza. The paper wrote, "Strong democratic nations are able to scrutinise their own behaviour, even in times of conflict. It is time for Israel to demonstrate its own democratic strength."

The Economist (UK) denounced the report as "deeply flawed" and detrimental to the Israeli-Palestinian peace process, arguing that it was tainted by anti-Israel prejudice in the UNHRC. In particular, The Economist chastised the mission for saying there was little or no evidence showing Hamas endangered civilians by basing themselves around schools, mosques and hospitals, and claimed that instead, the charge was supported by many reports in the public domain.

The Times (UK) criticized the report as "provocative bias" and described as dangerous and unreasonable the moral equivalence drawn in the report between Israel and Hamas. The Times praised Israel for quietly continuing to conduct its own investigation into the conflict despite the report, and concluded that Israel "is an accountable, democratic, transparent nation, and fighting to remain one amid challenges that few other nations ever have to face".

The Washington Post wrote that "... the Goldstone commission proceeded to make a mockery of impartiality with its judgment of facts. It concluded, on scant evidence, that "disproportionate destruction and violence against civilians were part of a deliberate policy" by Israel. At the same time it pronounced itself unable to confirm that Hamas hid its fighters among civilians, used human shields, fired mortars and rockets from outside schools, stored weapons in mosques, and used a hospital for its headquarters, despite abundant available evidence".

The Wall Street Journal criticized the report, calling it a "new low" in United Nations bias on Israel-related matters. WSJ wrote that the commission's members "were forced to make some astonishing claims of fact" in order to reach some of their conclusions. In particular, WSJ criticized the report's claim that the Gaza police force was a "civilian" agency and its inability to establish Palestinian use of mosques for military purposes despite evidence to the contrary.

=== Military commentators ===
Colonel Richard Kemp, former commander of British forces in Afghanistan, addressed the UNHRC in October 2009, speaking on behalf of UN Watch. He said that Hamas is "adept at staging and distorting incidents" and asserted that during the conflict the Israel Defense Forces "did more to safeguard the rights of civilians in a combat zone than any other army in the history of warfare" and that Palestinian civilian casualties were a consequence of Hamas' way of fighting, which involved using human shields as a matter of policy, and deliberate attempts to sacrifice their own civilians. He added that Israel took extraordinary measures to give Gaza civilians notice of targeted areas, aborted potentially effective missions in order to prevent civilian casualties, and took "unthinkable" risks by allowing huge amounts of humanitarian aid into Gaza during the fighting. Goldstone stated that Kemp was not interviewed "because the report did not deal with the issues he raised regarding the problems of conducting military operations in civilian areas".

Australian Major General Jim Molan (retired), who served as chief of operations of the Iraq multinational force in 2004–05, stated that "The Goldstone report is an opinion by one group of people putting forward their judgments, with limited access to the facts, and reflecting their own prejudices. The difference in tone and attitude in the report when discussing Israeli and Hamas actions is surprising." ... "as a soldier who has run a war against an opponent not dissimilar to Hamas, facing problems perhaps similar to those faced by Israeli commanders, my sympathies tend to lie with the Israelis." ... "But having stated my prejudice, I think I may be more honest than Goldstone, who seems to pass off his prejudices in a report that cannot be based on fact, and uses judicial language and credibility to do so. It comes down to equality of scepticism: if you refuse to believe anything the Israelis say, then you have no right to unquestioningly accept what Hamas says."

=== Legal commentators ===
Writing in the Financial Times Italian Jurist Antonio Cassese who was the first President of the International Criminal Tribunal For the Former Yugoslavia argued that critics of the report were relying primarily on ad hominem and strawman attacks. He argued that "critics have given inaccurate descriptions of the report's findings" and that "those who claim the mission's mandate was biased against Israel seem to have ignored a significant fact: Justice Goldstone, whose mission was initially asked to look into alleged violations only by Israel, demanded—and received—a change of mandate to include attacks by Hamas." Furthermore, he argued that many critics of the report "have launched personal attacks on Justice Goldstone's character" and some critics have even gone as far as labeling Goldstone, who is Jewish, "an 'anti-Semite' of a kind who 'despise and hate our own people'".

Former Canadian Minister of Justice, Attorney General of Canada, former president of the Canadian Jewish Congress and former Director of the Human Rights Program at McGill University Professor Irwin Cotler called the inquiry "inherently tainted", agreeing with Mary Robinson and Richard Goldstone that its original mandate was "deeply one-sided and flawed" prior to being broadened, and stating that the UNHRC is "systematically and systemically biased against Israel". He opposed the report, which he regarded as "tainted". At the same time, he is in favor of establishing an independent inquiry into the Gaza war, saying that Israel would set a precedent if it creates such an inquiry that according to his best knowledge "no other democracy" had.

Princeton professor emeritus of international law Richard Falk, appointed in 2008 by the United Nations Human Rights Council (UNHRC) to serve as a United Nations Special Rapporteur on "the situation of human rights in the Palestinian territories occupied since 1967", endorsed the report as "an historic contribution to the Palestinian struggle for justice, an impeccable documentation of a crucial chapter in their victimization under occupation". Writing in Electronic Intifada, Falk further commented that the report appeared to him to be "more sensitive" to Israel's contentions that Hamas was guilty of war crimes, and that the report in many ways "endorses the misleading main line of the Israeli narrative". Falk was critical of charges that the report, or the UNHRC, were biased and inferred that such criticism amounted to an attempt to "avoid any real look at the substance of the charges".

York University scholar of human rights and humanitarian law Professor Anne Bayefsky said that the report, which claims to be a human rights document, never mentions the racist, genocidal intent of the enemy, which Israel confronted after years of restraint. She added that the report relies on testimonies from witnesses speaking under circumstances that gave rise to "a fear of reprisals" from Hamas should they have dared to tell the truth.

Nigel Rodley, professor of law at University of Essex said the report "painstakingly documents" a large number of violations by Hamas, PA and Israel, and carefully provides evidence to back them. He explains that because the report focused on the loss of life, and because overwhelming majority of lives lost were Palestinian lives at the hands of Israel, it is natural for the report to give that more attention.

Harvard law professor Alan Dershowitz wrote that the problem with the report is what its composers willfully and deliberately refused to see and hear. He said that the commission ignored easily accessible videotapes that show Hamas operatives routinely firing rockets from behind human shields, and the report dismissed eyewitness accounts published by reputable newspapers and admissions by Hamas leaders regarding Hamas military activities.

University of Toronto professor of law Ed Morgan wrote in the Toronto Star that in dealing with the alleged use of human shielding of the Gaza civilian population by Hamas, the report "put its head in the sand", saying merely that "[t]he mission notes that those interviewed in Gaza appeared reluctant to speak about the presence of or conduct of hostilities by the Palestinian armed groups". The article also criticized the way the committee dismissed first-hand evidences from IDF soldiers implying that mosques were used as launching points for Hamas attacks and as weapons storage facilities.

Professor Daniel Friedmann, who served as the Justice Minister of Israel during the Gaza War, criticized what he called the "reinterpretation" of evidence unfavorable to Hamas. As an example, he cites the statement of the Hamas police force spokesman saying that "police officers received clear orders from the leadership to face the [Israeli] enemy". He says that the committee uncritically accepted the explanation that the intention was that in the event of an invasion, the police would continue to uphold public order and ensure the movement of essential supplies.

Writing in the JURIST, Laurie Blank of Emory Law's International Humanitarian Law Clinic and Gregory Gordon of the University of North Dakota School of Law said that the Goldstone Report's major flaw is that it fails the law. In their view, the Report incorrectly claims Israel disproportionately attacked civilians by relying on information gathered after the fact and discounting contemporaneous Israeli intentions or actions and the surrounding circumstances; the Report unjustly accuses Israel of a disproportionate response to eight years of Hamas's attacks, unfairly presenting Operation Cast Lead as disproportionate overall; the Report treats Israel and Hamas disproportionately by holding them to different standards, merely suggesting that Hamas's actions "would constitute" legal violations.

=== Other ===
Noam Shalit, father of Israeli soldier Gilad Shalit held captive by Hamas, urged the UN to take all possible measures to implement the Goldstone report's recommendations on the status of his son. The Goldstone report calls for the immediate release of Gilad Shalit and, while Shalit is in captivity, for access to him by the International Committee of the Red Cross.

Residents of southern Israel who testified before the commission regarding Palestinian rocket attacks on the region said that their testimonies were largely ignored.

Noam Chomsky argued that the Goldstone report is biased in favour of Israel since the report failed to question Israel's contention that it was acting in self-defence. Chomsky stressed that the right to self-defence requires that peaceful means are first exhausted before resorting to military force, something Israel "did not even contemplate doing".

The Trades Union Congress (TUC), the main federation of trade unions in the United Kingdom, "welcomed" the findings of the report.

J Street, a Liberal Jewish lobby in the United States, called on Israel to establish an independent state commission of inquiry to investigate the accusations detailed in the report.

Richard Landes, who also maintains the "Understanding the Goldstone Report" site, published in the December 2009 volume of the Israeli MERIA Journal critical analyses of the Goldstone report. Landes argued that the report fails to investigate seriously the problem of Hamas embedding its war effort in the midst of civilian infrastructure in order to draw Israeli fire and then accuse Israel of war crimes; the report is credulous concerning all Palestinian claims, contrasted with a corresponding skepticism of all Israeli claims; the report harshly judges Israel for war crimes, contrasted with its resolute agnosticism concerning Hamas intentions. Landes concluded that Goldstone actually participates in Hamas' strategy, which, according to Landes, encourages the sacrificing of their own civilians.

In an interview on the independent U.S. news broadcaster Democracy Now, Norman Finkelstein questioned the way the report judged the events in Gaza based on the laws of war, saying that Gaza did not meet the criteria of a war zone, calling it instead a "massacre". He went on to say that there was no fighting in Gaza, and referred to quotes from the testimonies of the Israeli soldiers published in the report by NGO Breaking the Silence. Concerning the substance of the report, Finkelstein says the Goldstone report is in-line with reports compiled by Amnesty International and Human Rights Watch in the findings that Israel had targeted civilians and the Palestinian infrastructure.

Yaniv Reich and Norman Finkelstein have commented that Goldstone's statement does not contradict the findings of the report, specifically pointing out that the report did not claim the existence of an explicit policy of targeting civilians.

=== Mission members' responses to criticism ===
Goldstone dismissed accusations of anti-Israel bias in his report as "ridiculous" and invited "fair minded people" to read the report and "at the end of it, point out where it failed to be objective or even-handed". Speaking in the UNHRC, Goldstone rejected what he called a "barrage of criticism" about his findings and said the answers to such criticism are in the findings of the report. Goldstone said that the United States, for example, had failed to substantiate its charges that the report was biased. In an interview with Al Jazeera, Goldstone challenged the Obama administration to identify the flaws the U.S. said it has found in the report. Alan Dershowitz in his analyses of the Report responded that as of January 2010 Goldstone had generally refused to reply substantively to credible critics of the Report and declined Dershowitz's offer to publicly debate Goldstone about its contents. Goldstone referred to his experiences of South Africa to reject Israeli PM Netanyahu's arguments that the report would make peacemaking more difficult, saying, "truth-telling and acknowledgement to victims can be a very important assistance to peace."

In an interview with The Jewish Daily Forward, published on 7 October 2009, Goldstone emphasized that his task was to conduct a "fact-finding mission" and not an "investigation". He acknowledged the reliance on Palestinian (Gazan and Hamas) testimonies, noting his mission cross-checked those accounts against each other and sought corroboration from photos, satellite photos, contemporaneous reports, forensic evidence and the mission's own inspections of the sites in question. He further acknowledged that "We had to do the best we could with the material we had. If this were a court of law there would have been nothing proven.... I would not consider it in any way embarrassing if many of the allegations turn out to be disproved."

Harper's Magazine published a brief telephone interview with Desmond Travers in which he was asked to respond to criticism of the mission and the report. He rejected the criticism that insufficient weight was given to the difficulties of fighting in the urban environment, and said that he was surprised by what he called "the intensity and viciousness of the personal attacks aimed at members of the Mission". He also said that the mission found no evidence that mosques were used to store munitions; in two cases investigated, neither was used as anything but a place of worship. He added that he had seen no credible criticism of the report itself or of the information in it.

Travers' statement regarding the use of mosques was challenged by a researcher at JCPA Colonel (res.) Halevi. Halevi said that the use of mosques as munition storage was supported by photographs of weapons seized in the Salah a-Din mosque in Gaza City during the operation, and the committee did not explain why it chose to disregard the information completely.

== Subsequent developments ==
=== Human Rights Council ===
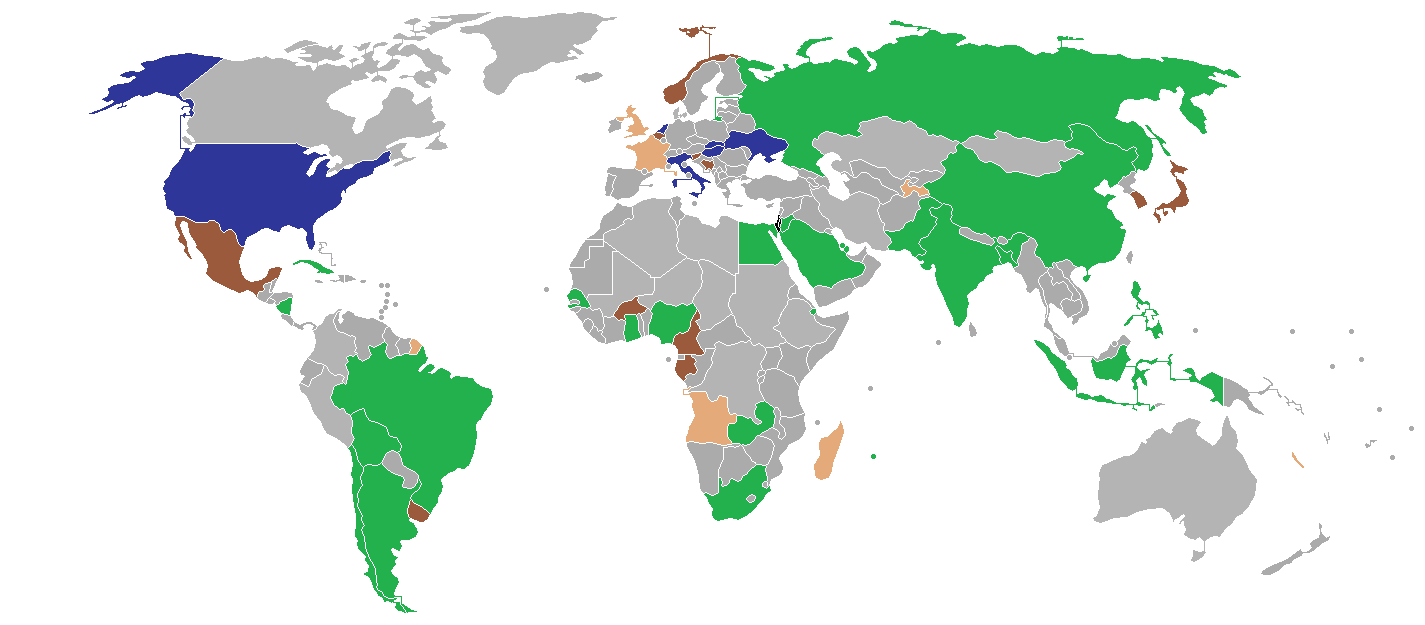
UN Human Rights Council vote on the resolution. Green represents support, blue represents opposition, brown means abstain, and tan means absent.

The vote for the UNHRC resolution endorsing the report was delayed on 2 October 2009 until the council's meeting in March 2010, after Palestinian delegation dropped its support for a resolution, apparently under heavy U.S. pressure. But on 11 October, Palestinian Authority President Mahmoud Abbas called on the UN Human Rights Council to hold a special session to endorse the Goldstone Report. UN officials announced that the UN Human Rights Council would reopen the debate about the report's findings on 15 October. UN Watch issued a statement saying that the announced special Council's session would be a gross abuse of the procedures. On 15 October, the UNHRC endorsed the report, a move that sends it on to more powerful UN bodies for action. The resolution to the council condemned Israeli human rights violations in east Jerusalem, the West Bank and Gaza, as well as chastised Israel for failing to cooperate with the UN mission. The resolution text also calls on the council to endorse the Goldstone Report, however the resolution explicitly mentions only Israeli violations of international law. 25 of the UNHRC members, mostly developing and Islamic countries, voted in favour of the resolution; the United States and five European countries opposed; 11 mostly European and African countries abstained, and Britain, France, and three other members of the 47-nation body declined to vote. The "unbalanced focus" of the ratification was criticized by U.S. State Department spokesman Ian Kelly and U.S. ambassador to the UNHRC Douglas Griffiths.

Israeli officials rejected the UN Human Rights Council decision to endorse the report. Israeli Arab MK Ahmed Tibi, Hamas, and Palestinian Authority representatives welcomed the vote.

The report was adopted by a vote of 25 in favour, 6 against, and 11 abstentions at a meeting held on 16 October 2009. The vote was as follows:

Goldstone criticized the United Nations Human Rights Council resolution for targeting only Israel, and failing to include Hamas: "This draft resolution saddens me as it includes only allegations against Israel. There is not a single phrase condemning Hamas as we have done in the report. I hope that the council can modify the text."

On 13 April 2011, the UNHCR recommended that the General Assembly reconsider the report at its sixty-sixth session (to be held in September 2011), and urges the Assembly to submit that report to the Security Council for its consideration and appropriate action, including consideration of referral of the situation in the Occupied Palestinian Territory to the prosecutor of the International Criminal Court, pursuant to article 13 (b) of the Rome Statute. The resolution was drafted by the Palestinian Authority and adopted by the Human Rights Council with 27 states voting in favour, three against, and 16 abstentions. It followed the second report of a Committee of Independent Experts, established to monitor the domestic investigations into violations committed during the conflict, which was submitted to the Human Rights Council on 18 March 2011. The report concurred with Amnesty International's assessment that – more than 18 months since the UN Fact-Finding Mission on the Gaza Conflict documented crimes under international law committed by both sides – the Israeli authorities and the Hamas de facto administration have failed to conduct investigations meeting the required international standards of independence, impartiality, thoroughness, effectiveness and promptness. The General Assembly has already twice called on the domestic authorities to conduct credible, independent investigations into the serious violations of international humanitarian and international human rights law documented by the UN Fact-Finding Mission, in resolutions adopted in November 2009 and February 2010. Those calls appear to have been ignored meaning that the General Assembly would be entitled to submit the issue to the Security Council.

=== General Assembly ===
The United Nations General Assembly endorsed a resolution calling for independent investigations to be conducted by Israel and Hamas on allegations of war crimes described in the Goldstone report. The resolution was passed by overwhelming numbers with 114 in favour and 18 against, and 44 abstentions. The resolution calls on the UN Secretary General to report to the General Assembly within three months "with a view to considering further action, if necessary, by the relevant United Nations organs and bodies", and to send the report to the Security Council. The resolution enjoyed wide support among the Non-Aligned Movement bloc and the Arab bloc that comprise a majority of 120 votes. Most developing countries voted in favor. The countries that voted against the resolution were: Australia, Canada, the Czech Republic, Germany, Hungary, Israel, Italy, the Marshall Islands, Federated States of Micronesia, Nauru, the Netherlands, Palau, Panama, Poland, Slovakia, The Republic of Macedonia, Ukraine and the United States. Some European countries, namely Albania, Belarus, Bosnia and Herzegovina, Cyprus, Ireland, Portugal, Malta, Serbia, Slovenia and Switzerland, voted in favor of the resolution. Other European countries, including the United Kingdom, France and Spain, abstained.

Israeli Foreign Minister Avigdor Lieberman said the vote showed that Israel has a "moral majority", adding: "[we] are pleased that 18 democratic 'premier league' states voted in line with Israel's position, while 44 South American and African states abstained". The Palestinian ambassador to the UN stated that "the General Assembly sent a powerful message", adding that if Israelis do not comply, "we will go after them."

The General Assembly passed a second resolution on 26 February 2010 to call once more for credible investigations into war crimes allegations detailed in the report, giving both sides five months to report on their investigations. The resolution was passed by a vote of 98–7 with 31 abstentions, with several European countries changing their vote from against to abstaining or from abstaining to supporting relative to the first resolution. Slovak Foreign Minister Miroslav Lajcak attributed the change in voting partly to a negative reaction in Europe to an assassination carried out in Dubai, which was largely blamed on Israel.

=== Security Council ===
Libya requested an emergency session of the UN Security Council on 7 October to consider the content of the report by UNHRC fact-finding mission. The request was rejected, but the Security Council agreed to advance its periodical meeting on the Middle East from 20 to 14 October and to discuss the war crimes allegations raised in the report. The report became the focus of the Security Council's monthly Mideast meeting on 14 October. Council diplomats say there is little chance that the Security Council will take any action, primarily because of objections by the United States, which said the report should be handled by the Human Rights Council. All of the permanent members of the Security Council, which wield veto powers, oppose involving the Security Council in the report.

The ICC Prosecutor could seek a determination from the Judges of the ICC Pre-Trial Chamber on whether he can open an investigation into crimes committed during the conflict on the basis of a declaration issued by the Palestinian Authority in January 2009. That declaration accepted the jurisdiction of the ICC over crimes "committed on the territory of Palestine since 1 July 2002". Legal experts dispute whether the Palestinian Authority is a "state" capable of making such a declaration under the Rome Statute. If the judges were to determine that the ICC could act on the declaration, a referral by the Security Council would not be required for the ICC to open an investigation. The ICC Prosecutor has not yet sought such a determination.

== Israeli internal investigations ==
The UNHRC Mission's report recommended that both sides in the conflict open credible independent investigations into their own actions. The Israeli military opened about 100 internal investigations into its actions during the conflict, of which about 20 were criminal. The Prime Minister's Office released a statement on 24 October stating that the Israel Defense Forces had investigated most of the incidents and accusations of human rights abuses mentioned in the report. Goldstone and human rights organizations said it was insufficient for the military to investigate itself, and the United States urged Israel to mount an independent inquiry. Goldstone also stated that an independent investigation in Israel "would really be the end of the matter, as far as Israel is concerned".

In October, support grew within Israel for the launch of an independent inquiry, although the IDF and Defense Ministry argued that it would discredit the military's own internal investigations. That month, Prime Minister Benjamin Netanyahu announced the establishment of a commission headed by Justice Minister Yaakov Ne'eman that would reassemble and reevaluate material gathered by the IDF to ensure that the investigations were thorough and that no facts were covered up. According to the report, the team would not question soldiers and officers.

Two professors, Moshe Halbertal and Avi Sagi, called for further investigation of incidents of Israeli troops opening fire on civilians carrying white flags, the destruction of homes in the final days of the operation and the destruction of power stations and water facilities. Former Israeli Supreme Court President Aharon Barak advised the Attorney General to establish a state committee endowed with investigative and subpoena powers to look into the claims raised by the Goldstone report. The chief legal officer of the IDF, Pnina Sharvit-Baruch, advocated establishing a commission of inquiry to respond to the Goldstone report, which she described as "very, very damaging" to Israel's international standing. She argued that an inquiry was needed to provide Israel with arguments that it had complied with the report's recommendations, rather than to uncover actual war crimes.

In January 2010, the Israeli military completed a rebuttal to the Goldstone report. The IDF affirmed that Gaza's sole flour mill was hit by tank shells in the course of a firefight with Hamas and that it was a legitimate military target because Hamas fighters were allegedly in its vicinity. The Goldstone Report informed that the mill had been hit by an aircraft bomb. Moreover, the Israeli military denied that the mill was a pre-planned target. (Photographs taken by a UN team to which The Guardian had access reportedly show, however, that the remains of a 500-pound Mk82 aircraft-dropped bomb were found in the midst of the mill's ruins.) Israel said it would present UN Secretary-General Ban Ki-moon with its response to the Goldstone report by 28 January to meet the 5 February deadline set by the UN General Assembly. Defense Minister Ehud Barak and IDF Chief of General Staff Lt.-Gen. Gabi Ashkenazi pushed for the establishment of a judicial investigative panel to review the internal IDF investigations and determine whether the investigations were thorough.

In January 2010, eight human rights organizations in Israel reissued a call to the government to establish an independent and impartial investigation. The call was issued by Adalah, the Association for Civil Rights in Israel, B'Tselem, Gisha, HaMoked, Physicians for Human Rights–Israel, the Public Committee Against Torture in Israel, Yesh Din and Rabbis for Human Rights.

In April 2010, Human Rights Watch released a 62-page report on Israels and Hamas' investigations. Concerning Israel, HRW reported that Israel had until that point failed to conduct a credible and independent investigation into the alleged war crimes in Gaza. "Israel's investigations into serious laws-of-war violations by its forces during last year's Gaza war lack thoroughness and credibility," HRW said in a release. In July 2010 Israel released second response to the report. Several soldiers were charged with misconduct, including manslaughter charges against a soldier for shooting at Palestinian women carrying white flags, as well as charges against use of a boy as a human shield. Brigadier General Eyal Eisenberg and Colonel Ilan Malca were reprimanded for authorizing an artillery attack that hit a UN compound.

== Hamas claims ==
Addressing the report's allegations, initially a Hamas spokesman in Gaza said that the rockets fired at Israel were in self-defense, and were not intended to target civilians: "We were targeting military bases, but the primitive weapons make mistakes." In what the Associated Press called "a rare deviation from Hamas' violent ideology", Hamas also initially said it regretted killing Israeli civilians. Ahmed Assaf, a spokesman for the rival Palestinian party Fatah, said he was "stunned" at the apology, and said Hamas should instead apologize rather to fellow Palestinians for the deaths and injuries Hamas caused during its violent struggle with Fatah over control in Gaza in 2007, which he called a "bloody coup".

HRW rejected Hamas's claim:

Hamas' claim that rockets were intended to hit Israeli military targets and only accidentally harmed civilians is belied by the facts. Civilians were the target, deliberately targeting civilians is a war crime.

HRW deputy Middle East director Joe Stork stated: "Hamas can spin the story and deny the evidence, but hundreds of rockets rained down on civilian areas in Israel where no military installations were located." The Associated Press noted, "Hamas fired hundreds of rockets toward Israeli towns and cities during the fighting, killing three Israeli civilians."

Several days later, Hamas retracted its apology, stating that its statement had been incorrectly interpreted. According to Gaza analyst Naji Sharrab, Hamas's retraction was likely a result of public pressure on Hamas in the Gaza Strip. "They are addressing two different audiences," Sharrab said of Hamas.

In April 2010, HRW reported that Hamas had not conducted any credible investigations at all. "Hamas has punished no one for ordering or carrying out hundreds of deliberate or indiscriminate rocket attacks into Israeli cities and towns," HRW said in a release.

== UN Panel assessment ==
In September 2010, A UN Human Rights Council panel said Israel and Hamas had failed to conduct credible and adequate investigations into the war crimes allegations contained in the Goldstone report. The panel said Israel only investigated low-ranking officials and failed to investigate the role of "officials at the highest levels", while Hamas was criticised for not making serious efforts to investigate.

== Future ramifications ==
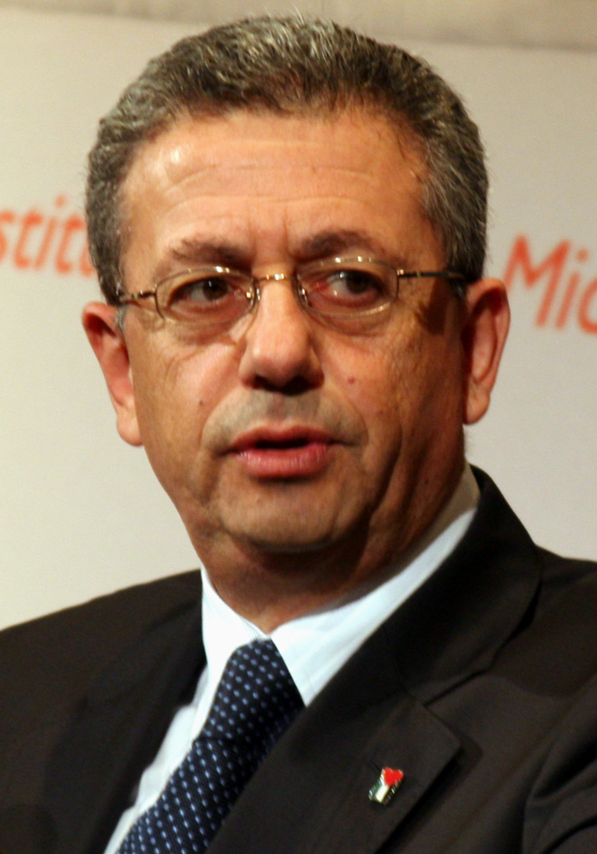
Mustafa Barghouti, Palestinian democracy activist

It has been suggested by some states, individuals, organisations and media outlets that the Goldstone report may have ramifications for other present and future conflicts, particularly conflicts between states and non-state actors such as terrorist organisations.

Israel has said that the Goldstone report poses a challenge to the ability of states to defend themselves against terrorism, and warned that similar allegations could be made against other militaries fighting in comparable circumstances. In a statement released by Israel's Ministry of Foreign Affairs, Israel claims that the report "[t]ies the hands of democratic countries fighting terror worldwide" and "[p]romotes criminal proceedings against forces confronting terrorism in foreign states". Following statements by the United Kingdom's Ambassador to Israel calling upon Israel to investigate the allegations contained in the report, Israeli officials reportedly responded that "[i]f a precedent is set of Israelis being prosecuted for acts during the Gaza war, Britons could also be placed in the dock for actions in Iraq and Afghanistan." Similarly, Israeli Prime Minister Benjamin Netanyahu, in an interview broadcast on Israel's Channel 10, said, "... countries that are fighting terrorism must understand that this report hurts not only us but them as well. It hurts peace. It hurts security."

Opinion and editorial pieces expressing similar views have been published in a variety of newspapers and media outlets in the U.S. and Israel, some claiming that American and European military forces could be subject to similar criticism for their operations in Iraq, Afghanistan and Pakistan.

An article published by the BBC said that the fact that the Goldstone report might have consequences for countries fighting terrorists that hide among civilians "may have been a consideration for the U.S. and some NATO countries that either voted against the UN resolution or abstained [at the General Assembly vote]". The article concludes by stating that human rights groups note that the report has reinforced efforts to tackle issues of impunity and lack of accountability for war crimes.

In an interview conducted by Al-Jazeera, American Professor of law and former Lieutenant Colonel in the Israel Defense Forces Amos N. Guiora and Palestinian politician Mustafa Barghouti both stated that they believed that the Goldstone report would have massive ramifications for the United States and other countries involved in military conflicts. According to Guiora the report "[minimizes] the nation-state's right to self-defence" and "raises extraordinarily important questions for American policymakers and for American commanders presently engaged in Afghanistan and Iraq and that same question is true with respect to other armies".

On 26 February 2010, in testimony before the House of Representatives Foreign Affairs Committee, U.S. Secretary of State Hillary Clinton "admitted that the report was problematic for the United States and other countries, which face the same type of war on terrorism coming out of populated areas". She also warned that if the Goldstone report were to set the international standards, the U.S. and many other countries might be accused of war crimes for their military operations.

In the wake of the report, and following receipt of material from South African, International Criminal Court prosecutor Luis Moreno Ocampo stated he was considering opening an investigation into whether Lt. Col. David Benjamin, an IDF reserve officer, allowed war crimes to be committed during the Gaza War. Benjamin served in the Military Advocate General's international law department, but was actually abroad for most of the period of the conflict and already retired from active duty. Because of his dual Israeli-South African citizenship, he is according to Moreno Ocampo within the jurisdiction of the ICC.

The European Initiative, a pro-Israeli group, lodged an itemized legal complaint with the Belgian Federal Prosecutor's Office and demanded that the top Hamas leadership in Gaza and Damascus be prosecuted for war crimes. The plaintiffs are Israelis who hold Belgian citizenship and live in the Gaza periphery communities that have been targeted by rockets. The suit is based on the Goldstone Report, as well as on reports by B'Tselem and Amnesty International.

UN High Commissioner for Human Rights, Navi Pillay, wrote that the even-handed and impartial approach of the team led by Goldstone is indispensable in preventing future human-rights violations and in establishing a solid base for peace and security.

== Goldstone's Op-Ed on the existence of an IDF policy of targeting civilians ==
On 1 April 2011, Goldstone published a piece in The Washington Post titled 'Reconsidering the Goldstone Report on Israel and war crimes' in which he re-iterated the basis on which the report found that Israel had targeted civilians:

The allegations of intentionality by Israel were based on the deaths of and injuries to civilians in situations where our fact-finding mission had no evidence on which to draw any other reasonable conclusion.

He goes on to explain that "the investigations published by the Israeli military... indicate that civilians were not intentionally targeted as a matter of policy" while "the crimes allegedly committed by Hamas were intentional goes without saying."

The other principal authors of the UN report, Hina Jilani, Christine Chinkin and Desmond Travers, have rejected Goldstone's reassessment arguing that there is "no justification for any demand or expectation for reconsideration of the report as nothing of substance has appeared that would in anyway change the context, findings or conclusions of that report with respect to any of the parties to the Gaza conflict". When Israeli journalist Akiva Eldar asked Goldstone to clarify what evidence prompted him to change his mind, Goldstone declined to answer, saying he had imposed "media silence" on himself.

Goldstone had reportedly came under pressure such that threats were made to ban him from his grandson's bar mitzvah at a Johannesburg synagogue.

=== Goldstone's statement ===
Goldstone wrote that the mission lacked evidence about why civilians were targeted in Gaza and so based its conclusion that Israel intentionally targeting civilians because it had no evidence to base any other conclusion on, but that subsequent investigations "indicate that civilians were not intentionally targeted as a matter of policy". In contrast, he wrote that "it goes without saying" that Hamas intentionally targeted Israeli civilians. Goldstone praised Israel for investigating claims of war crimes while faulting Hamas for its failure to launch any investigations of its own forces. Goldstone commended Israel for responding to his report by revising military procedures e.g. to discontinue the use of white phosphorus (including as a smokescreen) in or near civilian areas.

=== Reactions ===
Response in Israel to Goldstone's reappraisal of the report was harsh with Prime Minister Benjamin Netanyahu releasing a statement saying that the report should be thrown "into the dustbin of history" and Jerusalem Post editor David Horovitz writing that Goldstone had "produced a report that has caused such irreversible damage to Israel's good name" that the very least that Goldstone now owes Israel "is to work unstintingly from now on to try to undo the damage he has caused". UN human rights council spokesman Cedric Sapey stated "The UN will not revoke a report on the basis of an article in a newspaper. The views Mr Goldstone expressed are his own personal views." Sapey explained "A move to change or withdraw the report would either require a formal written complaint from Goldstone, backed unanimously by his three fellow authors, or a vote by the UN general assembly or the human rights council." However, Hamas spokesman Sami Abu Zuhri dismissed Goldstone's remarks saying, "his retreat does not change the fact war crimes had been committed against 1.5 million people in Gaza," while Palestinian Foreign Minister Riyad al-Maliki said Goldstone's comments did not change a thing and that "The report was as clear as the crimes that Israel committed during the war."

Hina Jilani, one of the four writers of the "Goldstone Report", noted when asked if the report should allegedly be changed: "Absolutely not; no process or acceptable procedure would invalidate the UN Report; if it does happen, it would be seen as a 'suspect move'." Also another of the four co-writers, Irish international criminal investigations expert Desmond Travers, noted: 'the tenor of the report in its entirety, in my opinion, stands'. Also Goldstone maintained that, although the one correction should be made, he had "no reason to believe any part of the report needs to be reconsidered at this time" and that he did not plan to pursue nullifying the report.

Human rights organizations said that much of the report remained valid.

American Jewish Committee (AJC) Executive Director, David Harris, said that "Judge Goldstone should apologize to the State of Israel for the accusations of intentionally targeting civilians, which he now admits were unfounded. He should present his updated conclusions to the UN Human Rights Council, as well as to the General Assembly, which endorsed the skewed report, and press for its rejection."

=== Statement issued by other members of UN mission ===
On 14 April 2011, the other three authors of the report released a statement regarding Goldstone's article in which they collectively stood by the findings of the report and lamented "the personal attacks and the extraordinary pressure placed on members of the fact-finding mission".

== See also ==
- Israel and the United Nations
- Palestine and the United Nations
- Israeli judicial system
- Israel Defense Forces Code of Conduct
- Palestinian rocket attacks on Israel
- Human rights in Israel
- Human rights in the Palestinian National Authority
