= Christine Chinkin =

British legal scholar (born 1949)

Christine Chinkin CMG FBA
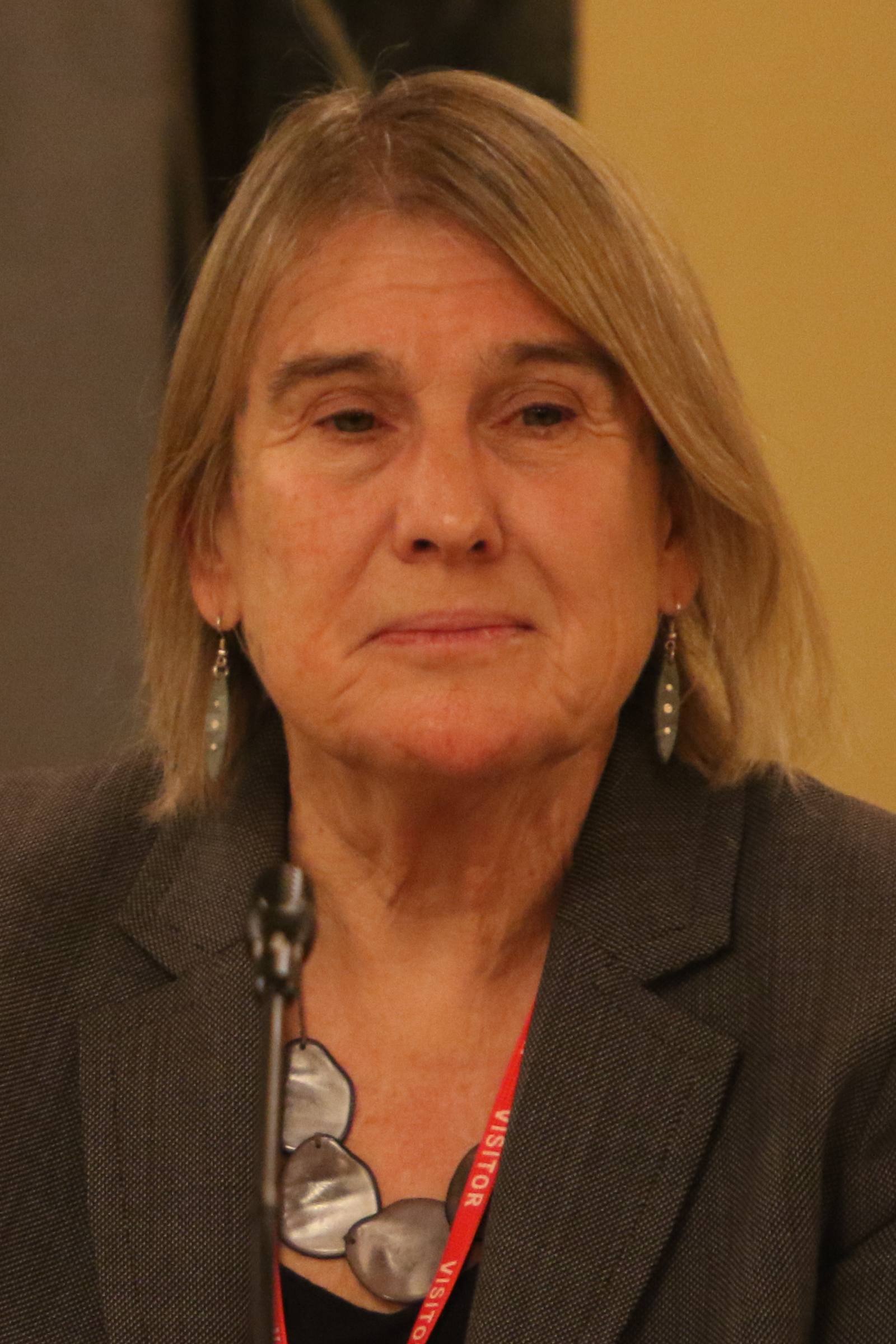
- Christine Chinkin, 2018
- Born: 1949 (age 76–77)

Academic background
- Education: Queen Mary University of London (LLB, LLM); Yale Law School (LLM); University of Sydney (PhD)
- Thesis: Third Parties in International Law (1990)
- Doctoral advisor: James Crawford

Academic work
- Discipline: Public international law
- Institutions: London School of Economics; University of Michigan School of Law
- Doctoral students: Guglielmo Verdirame
- Website: lse.ac.uk

Christine Mary Chinkin (born 1949) is a professor of international law and founding director of the Centre for Women, Peace and Security at the London School of Economics and Political Science. She is the William W. Cook Global Law Professor at the University of Michigan Law School.

== Biography ==
Chinkin studied law at Queen Mary University of London, earning an LLB with honours in 1971 and an LLM in 1972. She later received a second LLM from the Yale Law School in 1981 and completed her PhD at the University of Sydney in 1990. She has served on the law faculty at the University of Sydney and as dean of the law faculty at the University of Southampton.

== Legal career ==
She was a member of the four-person United Nations Fact Finding Mission on the Gaza Conflict created by the United Nations Human Rights Council. The commission's report accused Israel of intentionally targeting civilians, which caused great outrage in Israel. The head of the commission, Richard Goldstone, subsequently changed his mind, but Chinkin continued to insist on the correctness of its conclusions.

Since January 2010, she has been a member of the Human Rights Advisory Panel of the United Nations Mission in Kosovo. She is the chair of the International Law Association, appointed in 2021.

She was appointed Companion of the Order of St Michael and St George (CMG) in the 2017 Birthday Honours for services to advancing women's human rights worldwide.

Christine Chinkin was scientific advisor to the Council of Europe committee that drafted the Istanbul Convention. She is a member of the steering board of the Preventing Sexual Violence in Conflict Initiative of the UK government, and specialist advisor to the House of Lords Select Committee on Sexual Violence in Conflict.

== Published works ==
=== As author ===
- Dispute Resolution in Australia, co-authored with Hilary Astor, Butterworths, 1992
- The Boundaries of International Law: A Feminist Analysis, co-authored with Hilary Charlesworth, Manchester University Press, 2000
- The Making of International Law, co-authored with Alan Boyle, Oxford University Press, 2007
- International Law and New Wars, co-authored with Mary Kaldor, Cambridge University Press, 2017

=== As editor ===
- Sovereignty, Statehood and State Responsibility: Essays in Honour of James Crawford, co-edited with Freya Baetens, Cambridge University Press, 2015

== Awards and recognition ==
- CMG FBA
