= Gabi Siboni =

Israeli Defense Officer (born 1957)

- גבי סיבוני
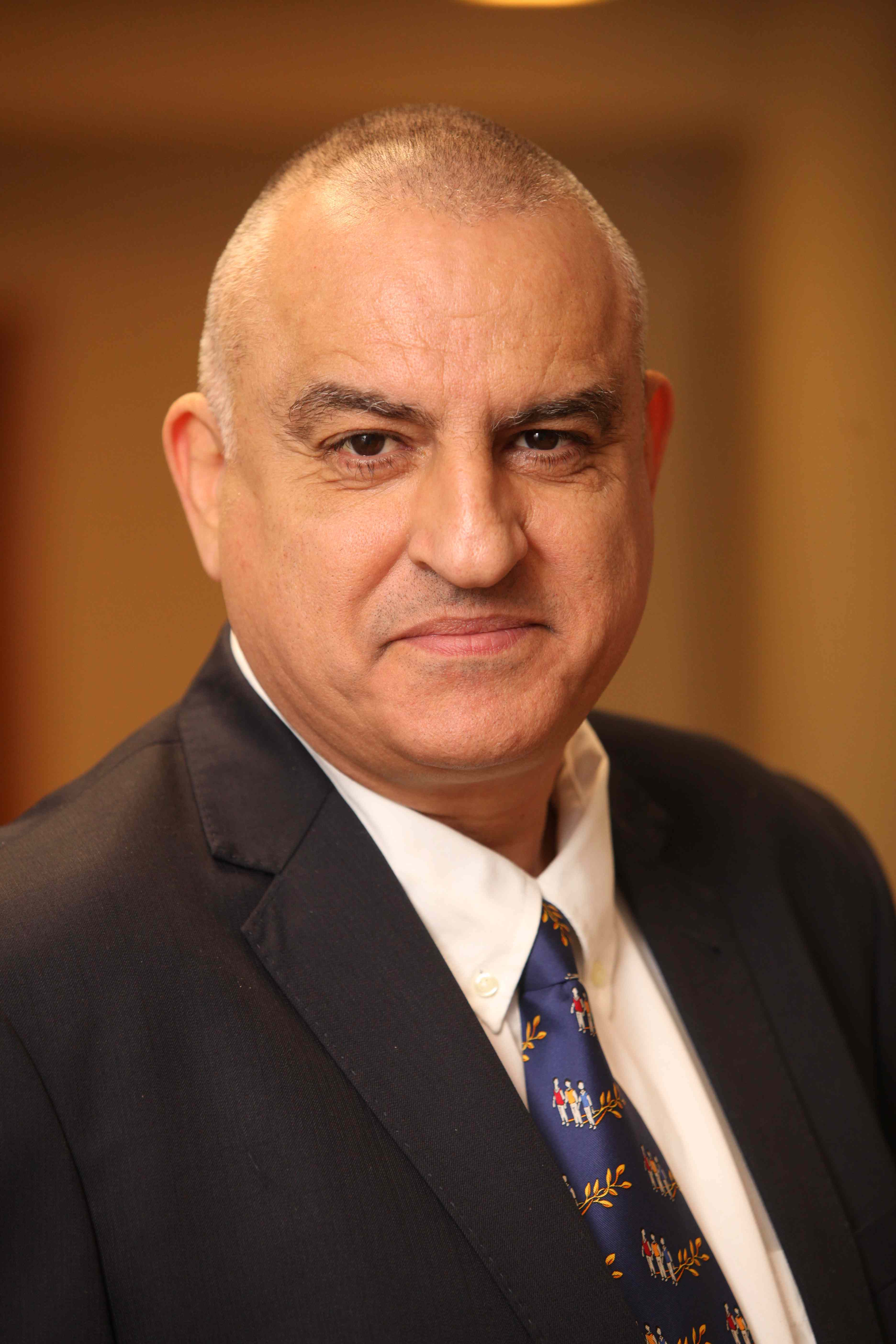
- Dr. Gabi Siboni
- Born: 1957 (age 68–69); Israel
- Military career
- Allegiance: Israel Defense Forces
- Service years: 1975–86
- Rank: Colonel
- Commands: Commander of Sayeret Golani, chief of staff of the Golani Brigade, chief of staff of a division, senior planner for the Northern Command
- Conflicts: Litani Operation, First Lebanon War, South Lebanon conflict, First Intifada, Second Intifada, Second Lebanon War
- Other work: Head of Institute for National Security Studies Military and Strategic Affairs Program and Cyber Security Program

Gabriel "Gabi" Siboni (Hebrew: גבי סיבוני) is a colonel (Aluf Mishne) in the Israel Defense Forces Reserve service, and a senior research fellow and the director of the Military and Strategic Affairs and Cyber Security programs at the Institute for National Security Studies. Additionally, he serves as editor of the tri-yearly published, Military and Strategic Affairs academic journal at INSS. Siboni is a senior expert on national security, military strategy and operations, military technology, cyber warfare, and force buildup. Siboni is an associate professor, working specifically in the management of Cyber Security and a part-time lecturer at the Francisco de Vitoria University in Madrid

== Early life and education ==
Siboni grew up in Safed, Israel. After enlisting to the IDF Siboni was assigned to the Golani Brigade, and served as a soldier and as an infantry officer. He served in the Litani Operation as a platoon leader, First Lebanon War as a company commander and commanded the brigade’s reconnaissance unit (Sayeret Golani), the brigade's reconnaissance unit in counter-guerrilla operations in South Lebanon. Within the scope of his Reserve service he served as chief of staff of the Golani Brigade. Siboni served as the chief of staff of a division during the Second Lebanon War and he presently serves as a senior planner for the IDF.

Siboni is a national security specialist and the director of the Military and Strategic Affairs Program as well as of the Cyber Security Program at the Tel Aviv University's Institute for National Security Studies (INSS). Siboni is also the editor of the Military and Strategic Affairs Journal (to be named Cyber, Intelligence and Security Journal as of September 2016). He serves as a senior consultant to the IDF and other Israeli security organizations.

In addition, Siboni is the deputy and chief methodologist of the IDF's Research Center for Force Deployment and Buildup. In this scope he develops strategic & operational warfare concepts for various domains, including: integrated combat in complex and densely populated areas, cyber defense and cyber warfare, cognitive and influence warfare and more. He also develops methodologies for computerized simulation for various needs, including for military operations.

Siboni holds a B.Sc. and M.Sc. in engineering from Tel Aviv University and a doctorate in geographic information systems (GIS) from Ben-Gurion University.

== Cybersecurity ==
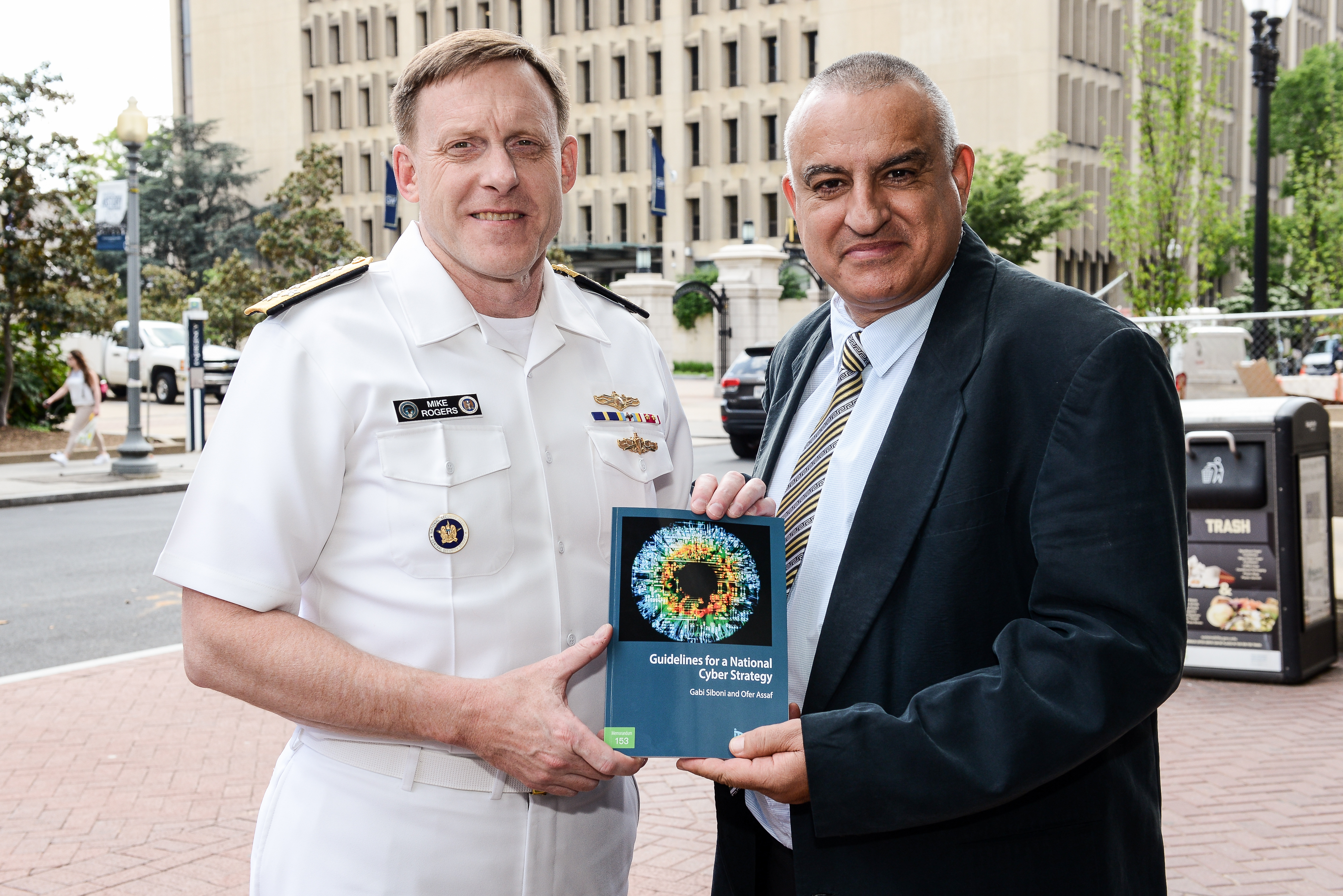
Admiral Michael Rogers and Dr. Gabi Siboni at the DCOI Conference, Washington, D.C., May 19, 2016

Siboni is a consultant in a wide range of fields, including: Cybersecurity (including ICS and SCADA Security), Information Technology, ICT Risk Management, and Strategic Planning. He has extensive proven experience in decision support systems (DSS) related to cyber security investment, and security & safety control systems.

His consulting firm, G. Bina, provides security and cyber-security advisory services across the top tier of the Israel private sector, including its infrastructure and defense firms, as well as most sensitive government, military and intelligence agencies. It also works in India supporting one of its critical financial markets infrastructure institutions and other global institution.

In his book Guidelines for a National Cyber Strategy, (co-authored with Ofer Assaf), Siboni outlines five points for which decisions are critical for determining a national strategy. Starting with the state's responsibility to protect the private sector in relation to cyberspace security and privacy issues. The second point relates to the state responsibility, to enforce the use of technologies and practices in cyberspace defense in the civilian sector, which in many cases is part of its critical infrastructures. The third point is the extent to which the state is entitled to store information about the civilian sector's activities in cyberspace in order to defend it. The fourth point concerns the state's responsibility to build cyberspace capabilities and use them in a manner that will attain the state's interests. And, finally, the fifth point is the state's ability to secure the infrastructure that will allow the realization of a cyber strategy over time.

In October 2018, Siboni published a book titled: Regulation in Cyber Space (co-authored with Ido Sivan)A comprehensive study on the regulation of the cyber space. The book reviews various regulation models in key western countries, evaluated regulatory strategies from parallel domains and builds a multi-layered regulatory model for cyber space. While the model addresses Israeli cyberspace, it provides applicable strategies for other countries as well. The suggested framework uses several regulatory tools and is based on self-regulation by government authorities as well as mandatory regulation for the private sector.

Siboni's professional standing in the security community is reflected in his being responsible for the organization of DCOI – the INSS USA – Israel Cyber Security Summit for the past three years. DCOI 2016, held in Washington DC in May, was a concerted effort of the state of Israel and INSS that aimed at enhancing collaboration between the two countries in cybersecurity. The summit was supported by Israeli state agencies and major private companies from across the U.S. Keynote speakers at this year's event included: Admiral Michael S. Rogers – director, NSA; Alejandro Mayorkas – deputy secretary, DHS; General David Petraeus – former director, CIA; Richard A. Clarke – former White House national coordinator for security & Shawn Henry – former assistant director of the FBI Cyber Division.

In 2016 within the scope of his consulting firm, G. Bina, Gabi has developed DSS, an analytical framework for cybersecurity assessment. This is a unique approach combines intelligence threats with organizations cyber controls maturity. The analysis process consists of three phases: First: Identify and Map the organization's cyberspace threats, and assess the organization's cybersecurity maturity level; Second: Analyze the organization's cybersecurity maturity correlated against the threats; and finally Generate a prioritized cybersecurity action and investment.

== Music career ==
Siboni is a guitar player. His first band was named GSM (Gabi, Shlomi, Michael) and was established during his high school years in Safed. In 2002 he established the band "Koach Meshikha" (Gravity) in which he played lead guitar together with his brother Prof. Daniel Sivan as a singer and rhythm guitar and his close friend Brigadier General Giora Segal on bass guitar. In 2009 and following his brother retirement, the band changed its name to "Jukebox" specializing in 1960s–1970s rock'n roll music. The band performs at clubs and concerts across the country.

== Recent publications ==
- The Threat of Foreign Interference in the 2019 Elections in Israel and Ways of Handling it, Cyber, Intelligence, and Security, Volume 3, No. 1, May 2019
- Ubiquitous Presence: Protecting Privacy and Forbidding Intrusion into a Person’s Records in Jewish Law, Cyber, Intelligence, and Security, Volume 2, No. 3, December 2018
- Guidelines for the Management of Cyber Risks, Cyber, Intelligence, and Security, Volume 2, No. 2, September 2018
- Developing Organizational Capabilities to Manage Cyber Crises, Cyber, Intelligence, and Security, Volume 2, No. 1, May 2018
- The Role of the State in the Private-Sector Cybersecurity Challenge, Georgetown Journal of International Affairs, May 27, 2018
- How Israel Should Respond To The Hamas-Led Nakba March in Gaza, Newsweek, March 26, 2018
- The IDF’s Cognitive Effort: Supplementing the Kinetic Effort, INSS Insight No. 1028, March 1, 2018
- Cyber Threats to Democratic Processes, Cyber, Intelligence, and Security, Volume 1, No. 3, December 2017
- Combat Military Service: The Crisis in Motivation, INSS Insight No. 997, December 12, 2017
- Alexander the Great Would Not Have Been Perplexed, Strategic Assessment, Volume 20, No. 3, October 2017
- How Israel Should Battle Hezbollah’s Campaign of Perception, Newsweek, September 18, 2017
- Four Big “Ds” and a Little “r”: A New Model for Cyber Defense, Cyber, Intelligence and Security, Volume 1, No. 2, June, 2017
- The IDF Exercises in Cyprus and Crete, INSS Insight No. 945, June 28, 2017
- Israeli Cyberspace Regulation: A Conceptual Framework, Inherent Challenges, and Normative Recommendations, Cyber, Intelligence and Security, Volume 1, No. 1, January 2017
- An Analytical Framework for Cybersecurity Assessment, in United States Cybersecurity Magazine, Winter 2017
- The First Cognitive War, in Strategic Survey for Israel 2016-2017, INSS, 2016
- Military Challenges Facing Israel: Multiple Arenas and Diverse Enemies, in Strategic Survey for Israel 2016-2017, INSS, 2016
- The Threat of Connected Devices to the Internet, INSS Insight No. 867, November 7, 2016
- The Superpower Cyber War and the US Elections, INSS Insight No. 858, September 26, 2016
- Structuring Israel’s Cyber Defense, INSS Insight No. 858, September 21, 2016
- Defense: the most important challenge in cyberspace, Ynet, August 22, 2016
- Guidelines for a National Cyber Strategy, Memorandum No. 153, Tel Aviv: Institute for National Security Studies, March 2016.
- The Cyber Attack on the Ukrainian Electrical Infrastructure: Another Warning, INSS Insight No. 797, February 17, 2016.
- Cyberspace Espionage and its Effect on Commercial Considerations, Military and Strategic Affairs, Volume 7, No. 3, December 2015.
- Israel and Cyberspace: Unique Threat and Response, International Studies Perspectives, December 29, 2015.
- Establishing an IDF Cyber Command, INSS Insight No. 719, July 7, 2015
- Confronting Spontaneous Terrorist Attacks, INSS Insight No. 667, February 24, 2015
- Cybersecurity Buildup of India's National Force, Observer Research Foundation, Digital Debate, CyFy Journal, 2015
- A good defense requires a good offense, even in cyberspace, The Jerusalem Post, May 27, 2015
- An Integrated Security Approach: The Key to Cyber Defense, The Georgetown Journal of International Affairs, May 7, 2015
- The Impact of Cyberspace on Asymmetric Conflict in the Middle East, The Georgetown Journal of International Affairs, April 29, 2015.
- Cyberspace Extortion: North Korea versus the United States, INSS Insight No. 646, December 23, 2014.
- Cyberspace in the Service of ISIS, INSS Insight No. 601, September 4, 2014.
- Developments in Iranian Cyber Warfare 2013–2014, Military and Strategic Affairs, Volume 6, No. 2, August 2014.
- The Iranian Cyber Offensive during Operation Protective Edge, INSS Insight No. 598, August 26, 2014.
- Cyber tools are no substitute for human intelligence, Haaretz, July 2, 2014.
- Iranian Cyber Espionage: A Troubling New Escalation, INSS Insight No. 261, June 16, 2014.
- Commercial and Industrial Cyber Espionage in Israel, Military and Strategic Affairs, Volume 6, No. 1, March 2014.
- No need to show Assad the door, Israel Hayom Newspaper, May 21, 2013.
- The Classic Cyber Defense Methods Have Failed – What Comes Next?, INSS, Military and Strategic Affairs, Volume 5, No. 1, May 2013.
- Iran and Cyberspace Warfare, "Military and Strategic Affairs", Volume 4, No. 3, December 2012.
- What Lies behind Chinese Cyber Warfare, "Military and Strategic Affairs", Volume 4, No. September 2, 2012.
- Cyberspace and Terrorist Organizations, "Military and Strategic Affairs", Volume 3, No. 3, December 2011.
- From the Second Intifada through the Second Lebanon War to Operation Cast Lead: Puzzle Pieces of a Single Campaign, "Military and Strategic Affairs", Volume 1, No. 1, April 2009.
- Operations Cast Lead, Pillar of Defense, and Protective Edge: A Comparative Review, a chapter inside "The Lessons of Operation Protective Edge", INSS, 2014.
- Defeating Suicide Terrorism in Judea and Samaria, 2002–2005, "Military and Strategic Affairs", Volume 2, No. 2, October 2010.
- The Second Lebanon War as a Watershed, "Military and Strategic Affairs", Volume 1, No. 2, October 2009.
- The Military Power of the Islamic State, a chapter inside "The Islamic State", eds. Yoram Schweitzer and Omer Einav, INSS, 2016.
- Cyberspace in the Service of ISIS, INSS Insight No. 601, September 4, 2014.
- Command and Authority in the IDF: The Winograd Challenge, "Military and Strategic Affairs", Volume 10, No. 2, August 2007.
- Victims of Friendly Fire: The Winograd Commission vs. the Citizens of Israel, "Military and Strategic Affairs", Volume 11, No. 1, June 2008.
- From Gaza to Lebanon and Back, "Military and Strategic Affairs", Volume 10, No. 1, June 2007.
- The Threat of Connected Devices to the Internet, INSS Insight No. 867, November 7, 2016.
- The First Cognitive War, in "Strategic Survey for Israel 2017", eds. Shlomo Brom and Anat Kurz (Tel Aviv: ֻInstitute for National Security Studies, 2016).
- The First Circle of Military Challenges Facing Israel: Multiple Arenas and Diverse Enemies, in "Strategic Survey for Israel 2017", INSS 2016.
- The IDF Exercises in Cyprus and Crete, INSS Insight No. 945, June 28, 2017.
- Alexander the Great Would Not Have Been Perplexed, "Strategic Assessment", Volume 20, No. 3, October 2017.
- Gadi Eisenkot and Gabi Siboni, The Campaign Between Wars: How Israel Rethought Its Strategy to Counter Iran’s Malign Regional Influence, The Washington Institute for Near East Policy, September 4, 2019.
- Gadi Eisenkot and Gabi Siboni, Guidelines for Israel's National Security Strategy, The Washington Institute for Near East Policy, October 2019.
