= 2011 Israeli social justice protests =

Also known as J14 protests

- Part of the spillover of the Arab Spring
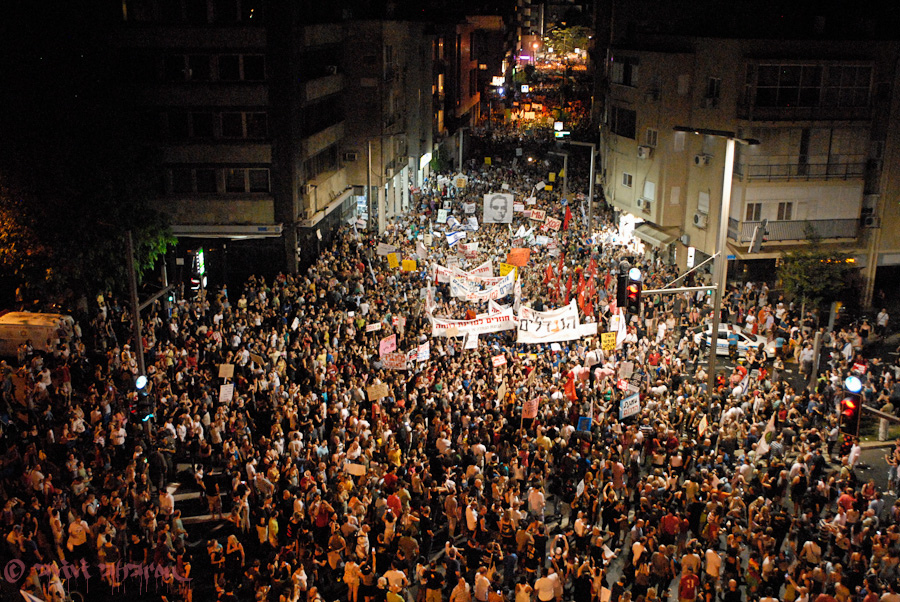
- Demonstrators in Tel Aviv on 6 August 2011
- Date: 14 July 2011 – 29 October 2011 (3 months, 2 weeks and 1 day)
- Location: Israel
- Goals: Providing solutions to the various hardships of the middle class and lower class in Israel (such as housing costs, cost of living and the erosion of the middle class and lower class)
- Methods: Demonstrations, civil disobedience, civil resistance, sit-ins, movement for recall elections, online activism, protest camps occupations, self-immolations
- Status: Ended

Lead figures
| See expanded section | |

The 2011 Israeli social justice protests (Hebrew: מְחָאַת צֶדֶק חֶבְרָתִי), which are also referred to by various other names in the media, were a series of demonstrations in Israel beginning in July 2011 involving hundreds of thousands of protesters from a variety of socio-economic and religious backgrounds opposing the continuing rise in the cost of living (particularly housing) and the deterioration of public services such as health and education. A common rallying cry at the demonstrations was the chant; "The people demand social justice!".

As the protests expanded during August 2011, the demonstrations began to also focus on other related issues relating to the social order and power structure in Israel.

The housing protests which sparked the first demonstrations began as a result of a Facebook protest group that initially led hundreds of people to establish tents in the Rothschild Boulevard in the center of Tel Aviv, an act which soon gained momentum, media attention and began a public discourse in Israel regarding the high cost of housing and living expenses. Soon afterwards, the protests spread to many other major cities in Israel as thousands of Israeli protesters began establishing tents in the middle of central streets in major cities as a means of protest. As part of the protests, several mass demonstrations have been held across the country, in which hundreds of thousands of people have participated.

A major focus of the protests have been what organizers have termed social justice. Part of the movement is about changing the social order, and the economic system. Calls to topple the government were made by some parts of the protests. Criticism of the protests includes accusations of a political agenda rather than a social one with revelations of funding from specific left-wing individuals and organizations like S. Daniel Abraham and the New Israel Fund. Maariv journalist Kalman Libeskind claimed that the spontaneous protests had actually been three months in the planning by Stan Greenberg and orchestrated by left-wing organizations and the National Left. Criticism within the protests accused the 'protest leaders' of not publicizing specific goals, the lack of visibility of their goals, and the damaging impact of media focus being on a few activists.

Following the first large-scale protests in early August, the government announced that a series of measures would be taken to solve the housing shortage, some of which were already under preparation and ratification, and some which were new measures proposed in response to the demands of the protest movement leadership. In addition, Prime Minister Benjamin Netanyahu appointed a team of ministers and senior staff members from his office, headed by Finance Minister Yuval Steinitz, to negotiate with the protest leaders as well as the Trajtenberg Committee. Since that time, there was significant criticism of the Prime Minister's perceived insensitivity to the public sentiment, prompting speculation that general sympathy for the protest movement may cause one or more members of the governing coalition to leave the government, triggering national elections.

On 22 June 2012, Daphne Leef and several other activists tried to restart the housing protests by re-erecting a tent encampment on Rothschild Boulevard. The municipality had not given a permit and as a result Leaf, along with eleven other activists, were arrested when they resisted the twenty policemen and municipal inspectors who arrived to dismantle the tents which were confiscated.

== Naming ==
The most common name for the protests in Israel (both during and after the protests) was "The social protest" (המחאה החברתית Hamechaa Hahevratit) the protests have also been referred to as the Housing Protest (מחאת הדיור Mechaat HaDiyur), Social justice protest (מחאת צדק חברתי Mechaat Tzedek Hevrati), the Cost of Living protest (מחאת יוקר המחייה Mechaat Yoker HaMekhiya), the Real estate protest (מחאת הנדל"ן Mechaat HaNadlan), the Tents protest (מחאת האוהלים Mechaat HaOhalim) and less frequently the middle class protest (מחאת מעמד הביניים Mechaat Maamad HaBeynaim).

== Background ==
=== Motivations ===
Numerous factors have led to the protests, in particular rising cost of housing and living expenses in Israel, but also various ongoing issues such as government corruption, rising poverty rates which the OECD defined as being twice the average of other developed countries, and a widening gap between rich and poor.

Demographic structural factors, such as a large percentage of educated but dissatisfied youth within the population, extreme poverty in the haredi Jewish sector, and high unemployment in the Arab-Israeli population have spread the cause of the protests amongst a wide swathe of the Israeli population. Many have also blamed the erosion of Israel's traditional egalitarian socio-economic model for the rise in public dissatisfaction, claiming that the rise of American-style social structures in Israel is incompatible with Zionist ideology (The word Zion does not exist in the referred article).

A major catalyst for public anger has been the significant rise in the cost of living, particularly for the lower and middle class. Although average salaries in Israel tend to be lower than those in the Western world, the cost of many consumer goods is relatively high – particularly basic necessities on which long established price controls have gradually been lifted. Since 2007, Israel has also experienced a gradual rise in housing prices. This increase followed a decade-long period of low housing costs, between 1996 and 2005, as well as a long history of significant government involvement in the public housing sector. According to data from the Israel Central Bureau of Statistics, from 2005 to 2011 apartment rental prices rose 34% on average, 49% in the Gush Dan region around Tel Aviv. A survey published by the Housing and Construction Minister of Israel revealed that in 2010, 129 average monthly salaries were required for the purchase of an average priced apartment, an amount significantly higher than countries in the Western world.

=== Events leading to the protests ===
In April 2011, about three months before the cost of living protests began, Boaz Gaon, son of prominent Israeli businessman Benny Gaon, presented activists with a ten-point plan by Democratic pollster and political strategist Stan Greenberg to defeat the right-wing. It was recommended that not one organization should coordinate the struggle, rather to divide up the effort with as many initiatives in as many locations as possible. Maariv journalist Kalman Libeskind suggested that the protests were a result of this plan.

During June 2011, a month before the housing protest began, another significant large scale demonstration took place in Israel. Commonly referred to by the media as the cottage cheese boycott, this event saw the Israeli public protest against the high cost of many products in Israel and specifically in this case, the high price of cottage cheese. The protest was successful and led to a drop in the retail price of cottage cheese. This was the first time in Israel that a public protest organized by means of social networking had such a wide public effect in Israel.

In July 2011, 25-year-old Israeli video editor Daphne Leef had to vacate the central Tel Aviv apartment where she had lived for three years due to major renovations in her building. Leef soon found out that apartment rental prices in the Tel Aviv metropolitan area had skyrocketed. Consequently, she initiated a small-scale public tent protest. Leef opened a Facebook protest page, inviting others to join her protest, and pitched a tent in Habima Square in Tel Aviv. In response, protesters gathered in the streets around Rothschild Boulevard in Tel Aviv, as well as in Zion Square in Jerusalem.

The use of Protest camps have been described by the protest leaders as being inspired by the Hooverville tent cities in the Central Park of New York City and in many other cities throughout the United States in which many Americans were forced to live during the Great Depression in the United States.

The use of social networks for public protests began to increase in the early 2010s, with the most significant one being the large-scale demonstrations in Arab countries in the Middle East that led to a change of government in several countries such as Egypt (see 2011 Egyptian revolution). Some see a connection between the Arab Spring protests and the 2011 Israeli housing protests, as the common denominator is, firstly, the use of social networking to organize public protests, and secondly the fact that these two waves of protests stem from the increase in the cost of living, that they were organized mostly by young people, and that the protesters claims include not only economic demands but also demands for changes in the policies and practices of the ruling government.

== Protests ==
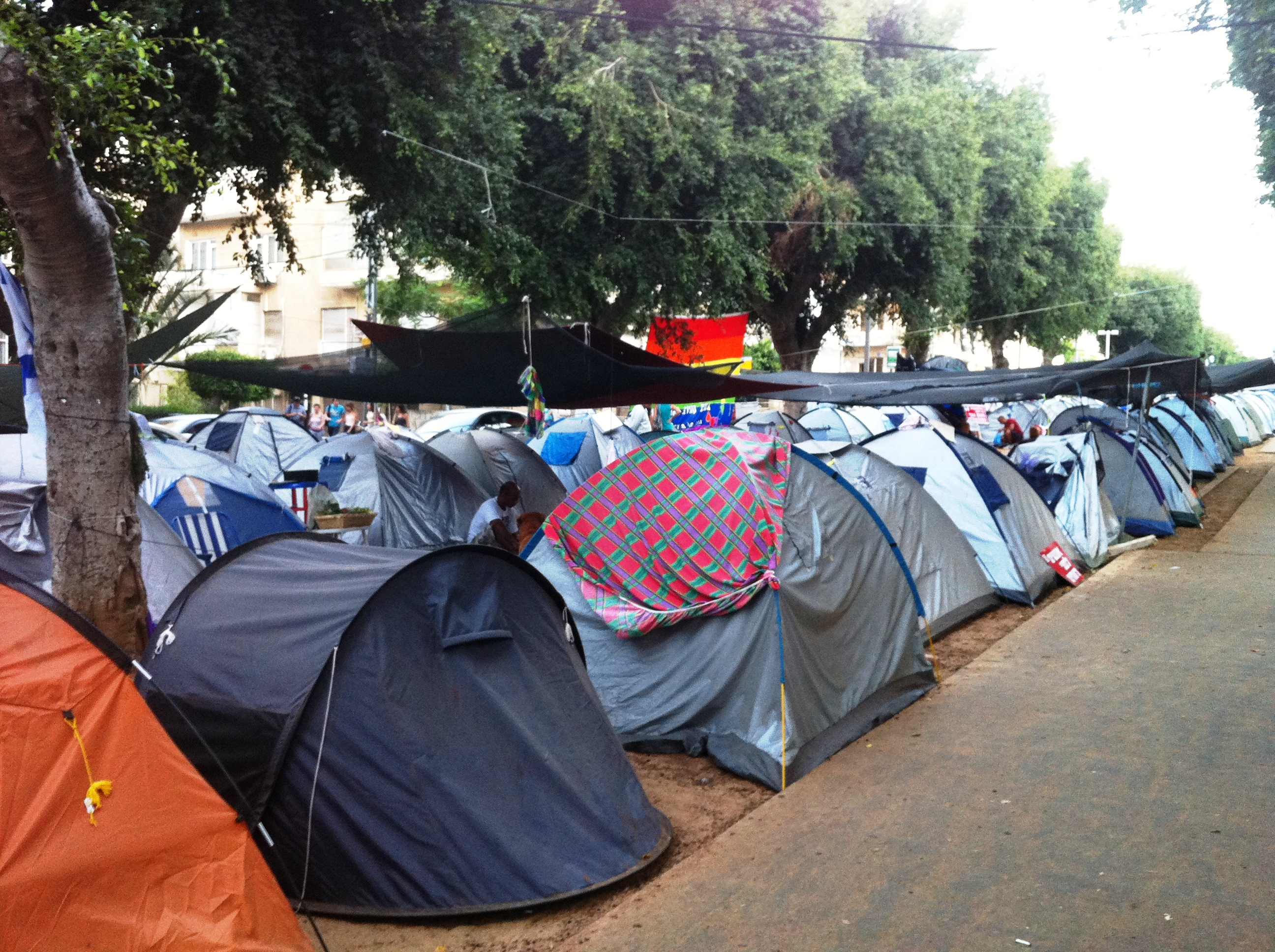
The protest compound on Rothschild Boulevard in Tel Aviv, 21 July 2011

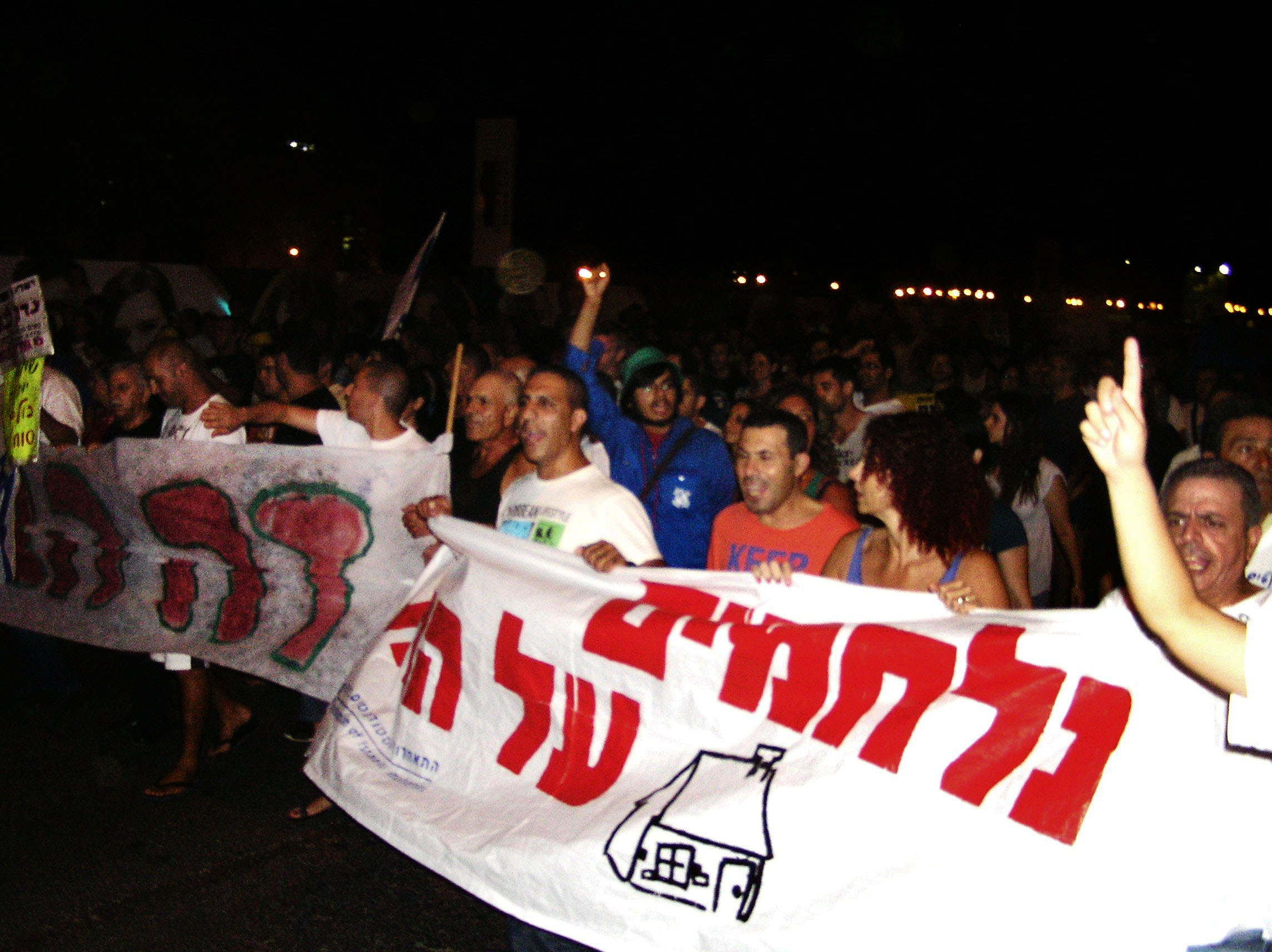
Demonstrators in Beersheba on 30 July 2011

=== Timeline ===
July

- 14 July 2011: 25-year-old Daphne Leef pitches a tent in the Habima Square in Tel Aviv and in addition opens a Facebook protest page, where she invites others to join her protest.
- 15 July 2011: In response to Leef's protest, many protesters gathered in the streets around Rothschild Boulevard in Tel Aviv where about 50 tents were pitched.
- 16 July 2011: the National Union of Israeli Students joined the protests.
- 17 July 2011: the Hashomer Hatzair movement joined the protests.
- 23 July 2011: tens of thousands of demonstrators participated in the protest movement's first rally held in the center of Tel Aviv which included a mass march from the tent compound at Habima Square to the Tel Aviv Museum of Art Plaza, where the main rally was held.
- 24 July 2011: a protest broke out in Jerusalem, in which 1,000 demonstrators marched towards the Knesset while causing major traffic disruptions.
- 26 July 2011: Prime Minister Binyamin Netanyahu announced new housing programs aimed at addressing the housing shortage in Israel and at supporting the students.
- 28 July 2011: the first "strollers march" took place in which thousands of Israeli parents took part, protesting against the high costs of raising children in Israel.
- 30 July 2011: between 85,000 and 150,000 people took part in mass rallies in major cities across Israel. Demonstrations were held in Jerusalem, Tel Aviv, Haifa, Beersheba, Kfar Saba, Ra'anana, Baqa al-Gharbiya, Ashdod, Nazareth, Kiryat Shmona, Modi'in-Maccabim-Re'ut, Netanya, Ashkelon, Tiberias, the Savion Junction, and the Jordan Valley.

August

- 6 August 2011: between 200,000 and 350,000 protesters took part in mass rallies in major cities across Israel. Demonstrations took place in Tel Aviv (150,000 – 300,000), Jerusalem (30,000), Kiryat Shmona (3,000), Hod HaSharon (1,000), Modi'in-Maccabim-Re'ut (5,000), Ashkelon (500), Dimona (200), and Eilat (1,000).
- 7 August 2011: some 1,300 parents staged "strollers marches" in Giv'atayim, Karmiel, and Pardes Hanna-Karkur. In Tel Aviv, some 100 right-wing activists marched in Rothschild Boulevard, protesting what they called the "anarchistic nature of the leftist housing protest".
- 13 August 2011: at most 75,000 people took part in mass rallies in major cities across Israel. Demonstrations took place in Haifa, Beersheba, Afula, Eilat, Rosh Pinna, Nahariya, Dimona, Petah Tikva, Modi'in-Maccabim-Re'ut, Beit She'an, Netanya, Ramat HaSharon, Hod HaSharon, Rishon LeZion, Beit Shemesh, and Ashkelon.
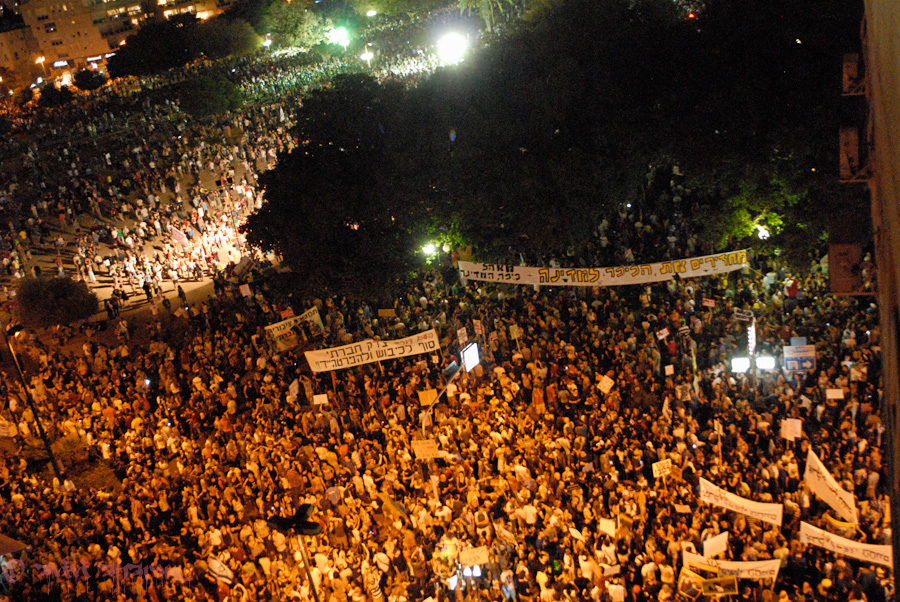
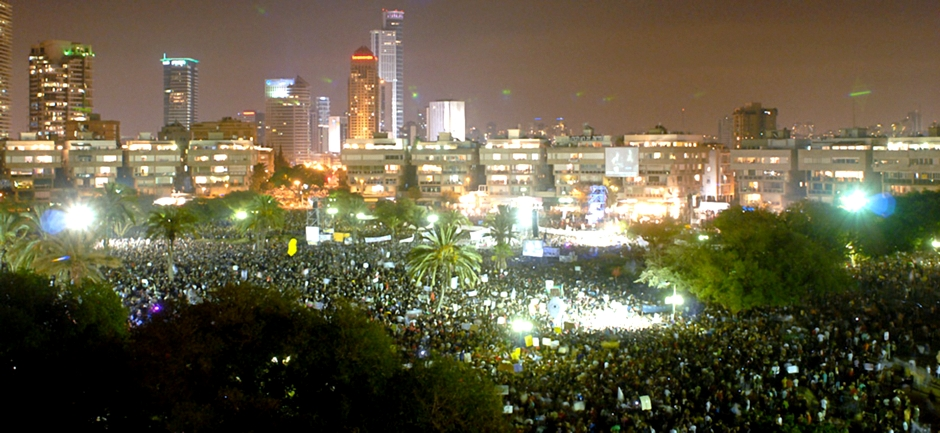
3 September protest in Tel Aviv
- 22 August 2011: The activists, including Daphne Leef, decided to take over abandoned buildings. Tens of activists, including members of Knesset Dov Khenin (Hadash) and Nitzan Horowitz (New Movement – Meretz) stormed a building on Dov Hoz street in Tel Aviv and waved placards calling for affordable housing.
- 26 August 2011: Protesters occupied a second abandoned building in Tel Aviv, on Bialik St., and had planned on staying longer but removed soon after and the building sealed by police.
- 27 August 2011: In Tel Aviv, around 10,000 protesters marched from Habima Square to the intersection of Ibn Gvirol and Shaul Hamelech streets, where a rally was held.

September

- 3 September: A protest billed as the "March of the Million" sees an estimated 460,000 people taking to the streets throughout the country, 300,000 of which in Tel Aviv.
- 6–7 September: The Tel Aviv municipality visits tent sites and posts notices that the area needs to be evacuated. Early next morning, city workers arrive to clear tents and other items and are called "Nazis in city hall uniforms" by activists. There were also violent demonstrations at the Tel Aviv city hall against the evacuation of the tents and over 30 activists were arrested.
- 27 September: In press conference, protesters warned Prime Minister Netanyahu that he has a month to make "real and serious recommendations" or "on October 29, just before the Knesset returns to session, we will take to the streets in full force. This year we will take the country back into our hands, rock and roll."

October

- 3 October: The symbol of the protest movement, the tent encampment on Tel Aviv Rothschild Boulevard, was dismantled by police.
- 15 October: An "occupy Tel Aviv" protest held on Rothschild. Several hundred gathered at Tel Aviv Museum plaza where opinions are voiced in "Hyde Park" speakers corner.

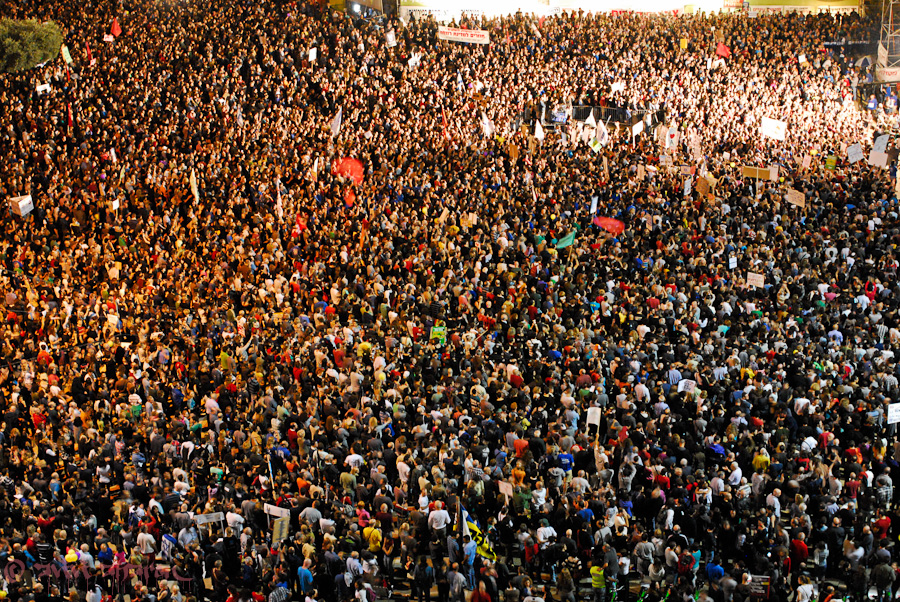
29 October protest, Tel-aviv

- 29 October: With renewed vigor, tens of thousands of protesters took to the streets of most Israeli cities, except for Beersheva.
- 28 November 2012: The Occupy-style encampment on Rothschild Avenue, which survived for over a year, was transferred by mutual agreement with the Tel-Aviv Municipality to a new location, near the Tel-Aviv Center/Arlozorov train station. The encampment at the new site survives to this date (July 2015), through a system of monthly extensions. Several attempts by the Municipality to evict the encampment failed, and its existence was also given a stamp of approval through a court process in late 2014- early 2015.

=== Cities and regions ===
Tel Aviv

Tel Aviv has been at the epicenter of much of the crisis and has experienced ongoing protests every day from 14 July 2011 onwards. The largest protests were held in downtown Tel Aviv, which has been considered the protest movement's most effective symbol. Hundreds of thousands of people have been estimated to participate in the protests rallies in Tel Aviv. By late 2015, the social protest camp in Tel-Aviv, near the Arlozorov train station, is the only one remaining in Israel

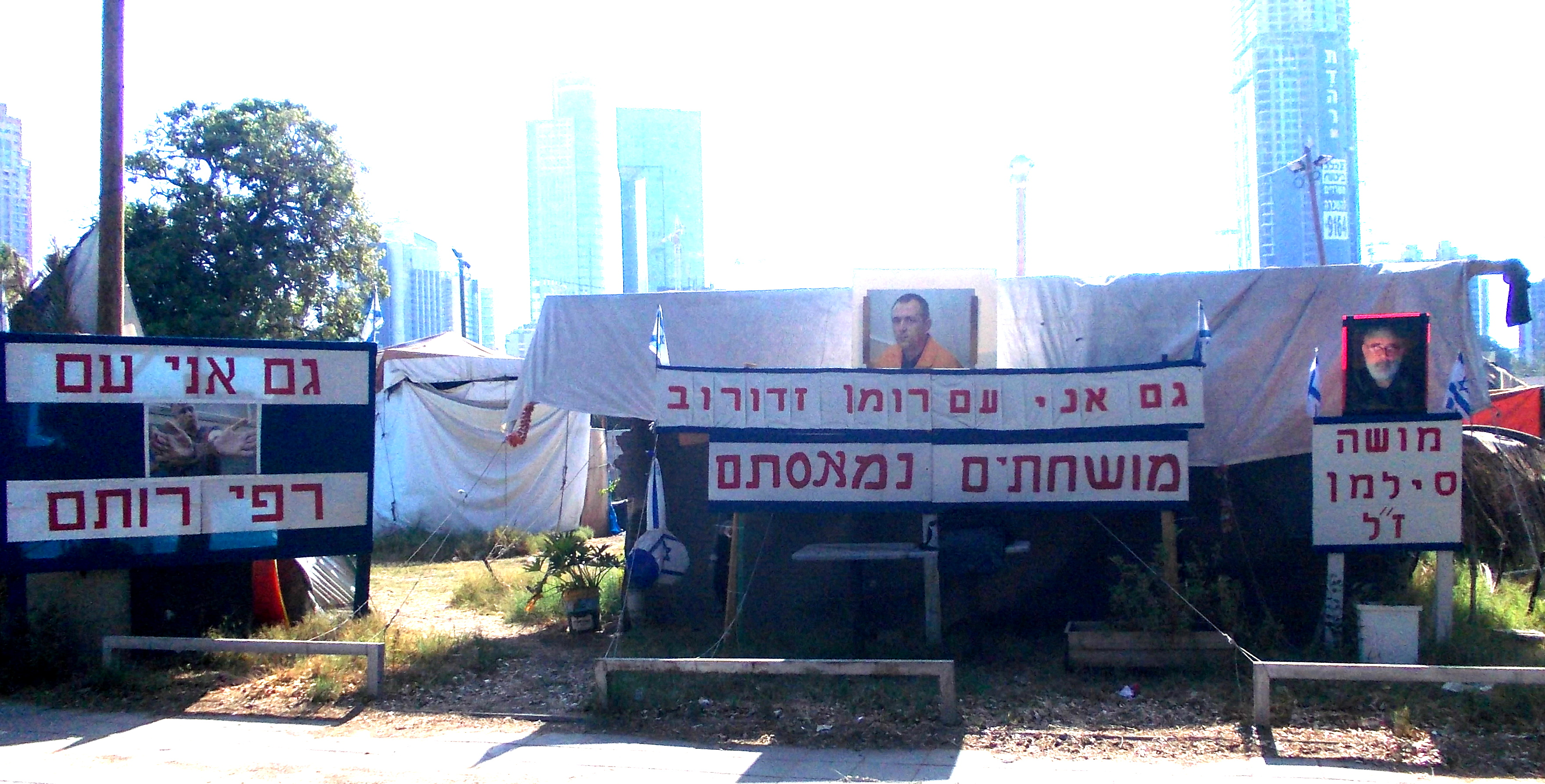
Signs in the Social Protest camp in Tel-Aviv, [OccupyTLV]. The particular signs, shown here, protest judicial corruption, highlighting the cases of self-immolated social protest activist Moshe Silman, of Roman Zadorov, who is widely believed to be falsely convicted on murder, he never committed, and Tax-Authority whistle-blower Rafi Rotem, at the time criminally prosecuted for harassing public officials.

Rishon-Lezion

Some tents were established at Rishon-Lezion's municipal park already in late July 2011.

Jerusalem

Haifa

On 13 August 2011 circa 25,000 people turned out to demonstrate in the Haifa downtown protest with leading local activists, deputy mayor of haifa, Shai Abuhatsira and chairman of the university of Haifa students union, Yossi Shalom.

Beersheba

On 13 August 2011 more than 20,000 people turned out to demonstrate in Beersheba.

Holon

There were approximately 10 illegally built shacks in Jessie Cohen neighborhood in Holon, built by people from the lower class. On 7 September the shacks were evacuated.

Jerusalem

There were some tents in Gan Ha-Sus in the city center

== Continuation of the protest into 2012 ==
Even though the protest ebbed in late 2011, it was revived in 2012. From early 2012, plans were made by various groups to revive the protest. This time the municipality of Tel-Aviv made a preemptive move by warning about no tolerance for any tents being placed on Rothschild St., so tents were instead placed near the railway station in Tel-Aviv. This time protesters were divided in two major camps, as some activists criticized Leef for using upper class donors to finance her protest.

On 22 June 2012, Daphni Leef was arrested at a demonstration in Tel Aviv while her arm was broken. On the following day, her supporters held a massive demonstration where 85 protesters were arrested and glass windows of banks were smashed.

As a result of the split within the protest movement, two separate social justice demonstrations were held in Tel-Aviv on 14 July 2012, to commemorate the first anniversary of the social justice protest.

== Government reactions ==
The Israeli Prime Minister Binyamin Netanyahu initially reacted to the protests by stating that he is aware of the crisis, and that "the government is working to fix the plague that haunts us for many years. We are a small country, there is great demand and not enough apartments. Help me pass the reform in the Israel Lands Administration". Netanyahu also clarified that "It would take between a year to three years until we would begin seeing results."

=== Government housing plans ===
On 26 July 2011, Prime Minister Netanyahu announced a new housing plan, including significant incentives for contractors who build smaller apartments, rent-earmarked housing and student housing, and plans to add 50,000 apartments to Israel's housing market over the next two years. The plan would allow contractors to purchase land from the Israel Land Administration up to 50% cheaper if they agree to build small apartments. Contractors bidding on rent-earmarked housing projects would be obligated to rent out 50% of their apartments built for a period of at least ten years, at 30% of their current value, and would be allowed to sell the other 50% of apartments at a price they can set. Contractors would be allowed to raise rent rates annually, in accordance with the consumer price index. Contractors and land developers who build student housing would be given land for free, but would have to agree to government-supervised rent rates for twenty years. Netanyahu's plan also called for six newly appointed national housing boards to authorize housing projects with little bureaucracy. The boards' mandate would be reviewed every eighteen months. Netanyahu also said that the government would promote the construction of 10,000 housing units for students, and would subsidize students' transportation to allow them to seek housing further away from universities.

=== Trajtenberg Committee ===
On 8 August 2011, Prime Minister Netanyahu appointed a committee to pinpoint and propose solutions to Israel's socioeconomic problems. The committee's task was to hold discussions with "different groups and sectors within the public", and subsequently make proposals to the government's socioeconomic cabinet, headed by Finance Minister Yuval Steinitz. Professor Manuel Trajtenberg, chairman of the Planning and Budgeting Committee of the Council for Higher Education, former head of the National Economic Council, and the former Chief Economic Adviser to the Prime Minister, was appointed to head the committee. The committee consists of 14 members, 10 of whom are government or public officials.

== Protest leadership ==
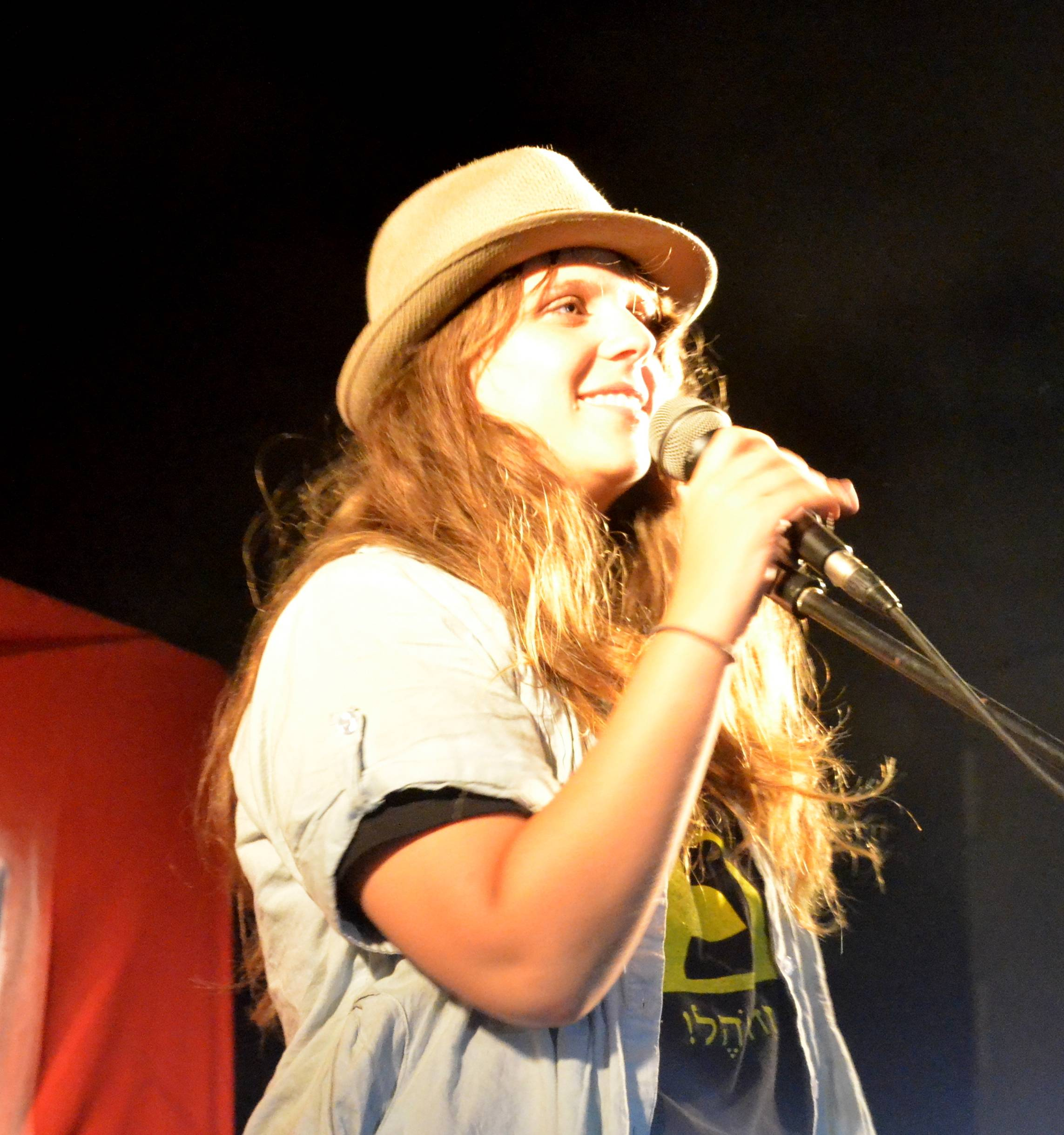
Daphne Leef speaking at a protest rally in Tel Aviv, 23 July 2011

The 2011 Israeli housing protests have no formal leadership.

Amongst the most prominent activists in the protests are Daphne Leef, Stav Shaffir, Yigal Rambam, Jonathan Levy, Orly Weisselberg, Roee Neuman, Jonathan Miller, Regev Kontas, Adam Dovz'insky, Itzik Shmuli, Baroch Oren and Boaz Gaon. Actively contributing and supporting the protests were newspaper columnists Roy Arad and Shlomo Kraus.

Adam Dovz'insky, who took a prominent part at the beginning of the protests with a hunger strike that ended when he collapsed and needed medical attention, would later declare that the Rothschild Blvd leadership does not want solutions but rather to topple the Netanyahu government, that the protests seemed to be the end themselves, not a means toward achieve negotiations. Dovz'insky also said he had information connected the protests with European anarchists.

=== Demands of the protesters ===
The initial objective of the leaders of the protest movement focused on reducing the costs of housing in Israel. For the most part, the protest leadership has declared that they would not offer any concrete solutions to the crisis on the grounds that it is not their role, but the government's role. However, the demonstrators in Tel Aviv have promised to work together with the Knesset members and other decision makers to promote legislation aimed at protecting apartment renters against exploitation of their hardships by landlords, in a way that would correspond to similar legislation worldwide. At some of the public events, protesters call revolution, for Netanyahu's resignation, and the downfall of the government.

Nevertheless, in August 2011, as the protests grew significantly, the demands became more radical as they began to call for a sweeping overhaul of the Israeli economy and society which would change the current neoliberal approach of the Netanyahu government to a more social approach. The list of demands for broader changes in the Israeli society and governance, articulated by protesters and activists, includes the following:

| Demand | Ref |
|---|---|
| 1. A new taxation system would be implemented (which would include lower indirect taxes and higher direct taxes). | |
| 2. Free schooling from an early age. | |
| 3. Privatization of state-owned enterprises would end. | |
| 4. More resources would be invested on public housing and public transportation. | |

== Organizations and individuals who have joined the protest ==
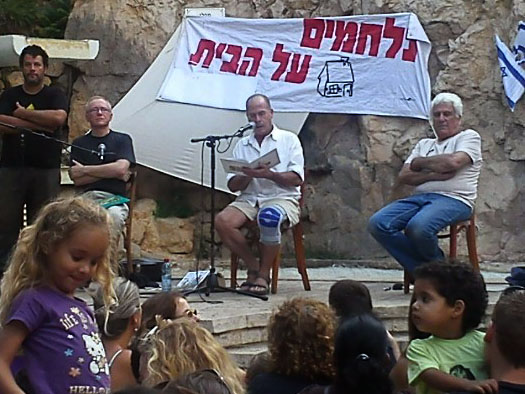
Meir Shalev, David Grossman and Yossi Abulafia at the demonstration in Jerusalem

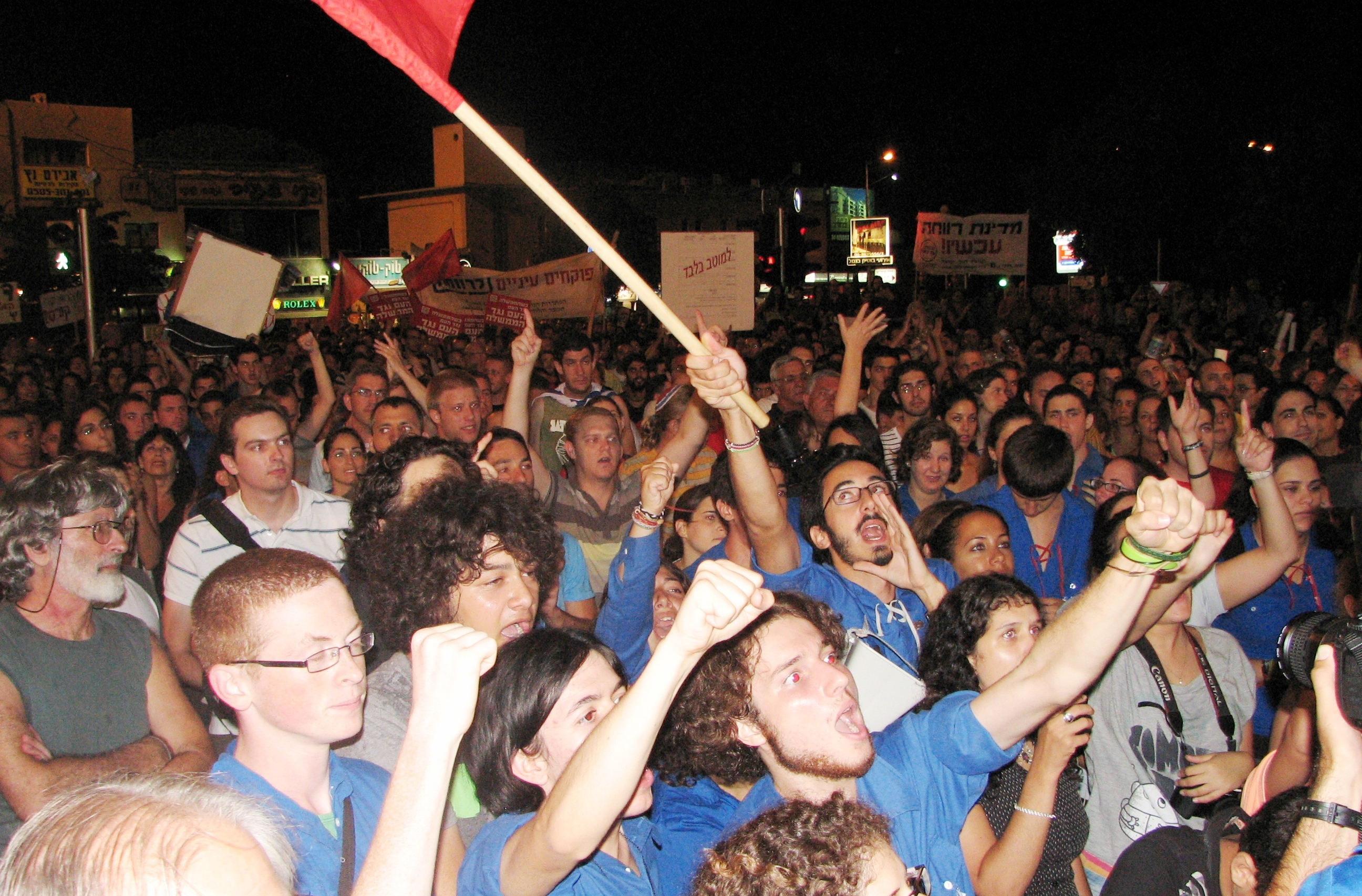
A group of demonstrators from the HaShomer HaTzair (white laces), HaMahanot HaOlim (buttons) and HaNoar HaOved VeHaLomed (red laces) Israeli Socialist youth movements in the demonstration in Haifa on 30 July 2011

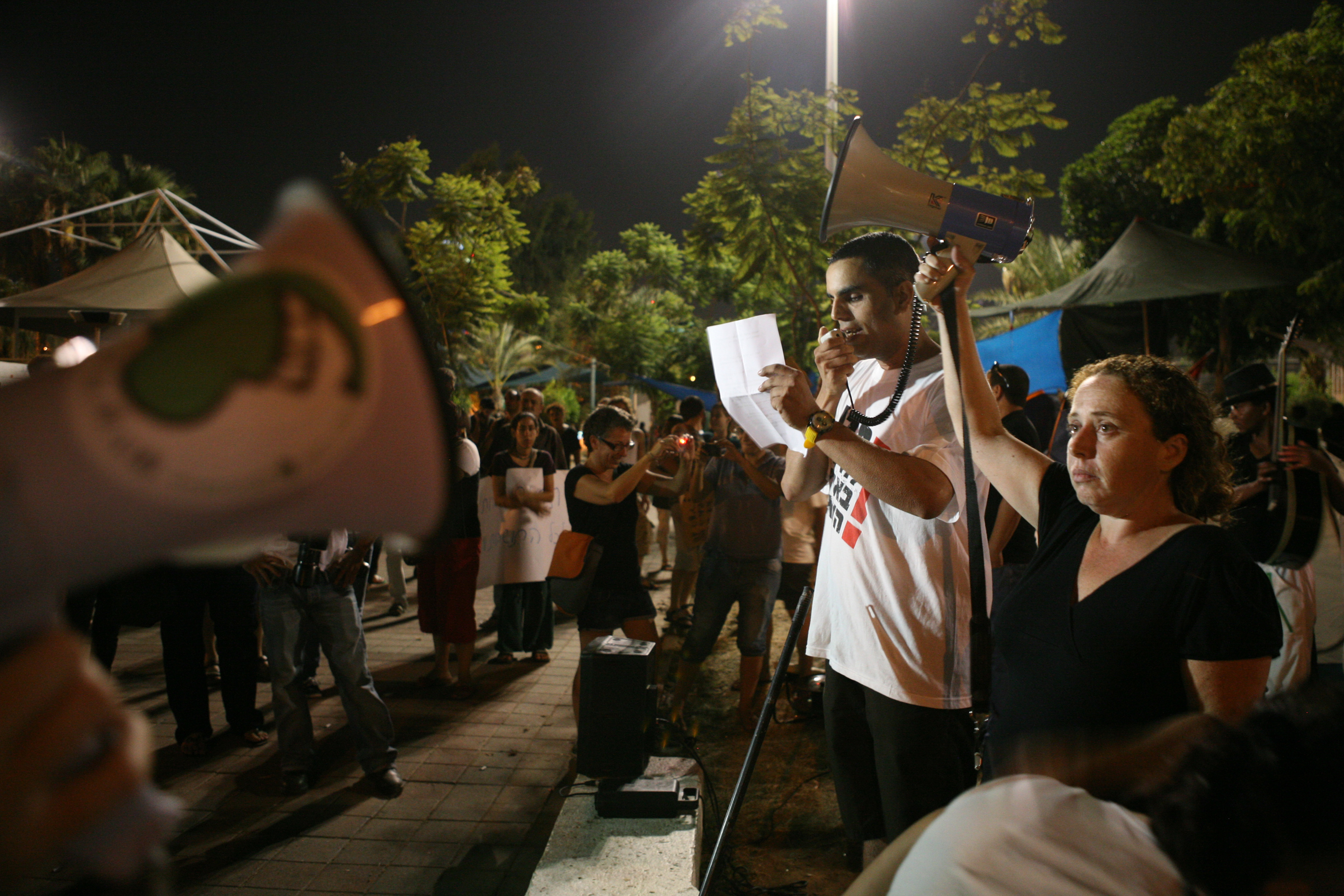
Speeches at the demonstration for the residents of southern Tel Aviv, a tent camp in the garden of Lewinsky

Many movements and organizations have joined the protest. According to the Israeli newspaper "Israel HaYom", two weeks prior to the protest, the Israeli social movement "the National Left" sought people on Facebook "who have unreasonable rent fees" to start a campaign to lower the cost of housing for young people. On the day on which the protest began, "the National Left" movement called its activists to get to the Rothschild Boulevard, and organized the delivery of 20 tents to the encampment. In an interview with the Israeli morning show "HaOlam HaBoker" the chairman of the movement, Eldad Yaniv, addressed "Israel HaYom"'s report and explained that the movement "organizes many protests like this throughout country and it just happened that this one became popular". Several activists posted Daphne Leef's call on the movement's web site and invited their friends to join the encampment. The movement also initiated the establishment of a website to accompany the protest and assisted in managing the encampment, in part by the introduction of "popular assemblies" for making decisions on the conduct of the protest.

The protest also gained support from the National Union of Israeli Students and the local student unions throughout Israel, who helped establish the encampments and organized transportation to the demonstration in Tel Aviv. The Jewish U.S.-based non-profit organization "New Israel Fund" gave guidance and logistical support to the encampments in Kiryat Shmona, Be'er Sheva and elsewhere. The head of the Shatil activist wing of the New Israel Fund admitted that the group was working behind the scenes and coordinating multiple tent locations and published a report on its activities. Most of the protests were financed by online donations.

The Zionist extra-parliamentary group "Im Tirtzu", which initially supported the protests, later announced that it would stop its involvement due to the participation of the "New Israel Fund". The Bnei Akiva and the "Rannim" movements (both of the religious Zionism) announced that they would also stop their involvement in the protests in Tel Aviv. The "Rannim" movement later announced it would continue its participation in the protest but only in the Jerusalem encampment.

The protests were also joined by "The Coalition for Affordable Housing" and "The Headquarters for a Liable Housing" who bind the following organizations: Association for Civil Rights in Israel, Bimkom, Women Lawyers for Social Justice, Society for the Protection of Nature in Israel, Movement for Quality Government in Israel, Greenpeace Israel, Mizrahi Democratic Rainbow Coalition and the Israel Union for Environmental Defense. Additional organizations who joined the protests include the Koach La Ovdim General trade union, the Socialist–Zionist youth movements HaNoar HaOved VeHaLomed and Hashomer Hatzair, the non-Zionist left-wing organization Ma'avak Sotzialisti the Israeli human rights organization Rabbis for Human Rights, Physicians for Human Rights-Israel, and the political parties Meretz and Hadash.

The protests also gained the support of various Israeli mayors and local councils, including the mayor of Tel Aviv Ron Huldai, the mayor of Jerusalem Nir Barkat and the chairman of the Union of Local Authorities in Israel, Shlomo Bohbot. Knesset members from both the coalition and the opposition have expressed their support for the struggle; some even visited the various protest encampments. Two weeks after the start of the protest, the chairman of the Histadrut, Ofer Eini, met with protest leaders and announced that the Histadrut would assist them in their contacts with the government.

Jimmy Wales, a co-founder of Wikipedia, visited the tent cities in Tel Aviv where the protests were taking place. He said, "It's wonderful that in the democracy here, people have the right to go out and express their opinion. I do not know if I agree with the protest or not, because I'm not familiar with the economic and social situation in Israel, but the very fact that freedom of speech and discourse are free in Israel is remarkable."

The New Israel Fund had originally denied its role in the development of the protests, but in a January 2012 message, it says that the protestors "organized themselves in new and existing organizations, virtual and community initiatives, local and national groups. Mapping the initiatives, which were initiated by Shatil and the New Israel Fund, outlines the role of this 'big bang'."

== Public opinion ==
According to a poll by Channel 10 on 2 August 2011, there is broad public support for the protesters, including 98% of Kadima supporters, and 85% of Netanyahu's Likud supporters.

Along with the massive support the housing protest has gained, as the protest kept developing and, various public figures and organizations, mostly affiliated with the political right in Israel, gradually increased their criticism of the protests and their organizers. Most of the criticism has focused on the allegations that the protests were not spontaneous, and that they were scheduled and planned by various left-wing media and political organizations in Israel. It is alleged that these organizations exploited the protests initiated by Daphne Leef as well as the economic distress that exists among large sections of the Israeli public in order to promote a political agenda that they finance, and which is primarily designed to overthrow the current right-wing government headed by Benjamin Netanyahu; it is alleged that finding actual solutions to the housing crises in Israel is only a secondary concern. The Tel-Aviv city hall was criticized for indirectly supporting the protests at 40,000ILS per day, price including electricity and clean services. While the protests in general have been peaceful, some incidents of violence have been reported. On 4 August 2011, two activists were arrested following an attempt to burn down the tent of right-wing activists participating at the Rothschild location. At a press conference held on 26 July 2011 Daphne Leef responded to the various allegations made against her and the protest organizers and stated the following:

What hasn't been said about me in the recent days? When we came here with our tents about ten days ago, some said we are spoiled children from Tel Aviv, some said we are leftists, but after more cities from across the country and as more people from across the entire political spectrum in Israel joined the protests – all understood that we represent all the people.

== Responses ==
=== Political ===
- The mayor of Jerusalem Nir Barkat stated that "the government must produce affordable housing" and that "I expect the government and the Israel Lands Administration to take responsibility for the matter." Barkat pointed to the model which was pioneered by the Jerusalem Municipality, which allows young people to live in affordable housing in Jerusalem.
- The mayor of Tel Aviv Ron Huldai also declared that "the tent demonstrations are justified and appropriate" and that "the [central] government is abandoning social issues to market forces." Nevertheless, Huldai oversaw the eviction of protest sites in autumn 2011.
- MK Nitzan Horowitz of Meretz showed his support in the protests and referred to the protesters as "the new homeless people of Netanyahu and Finance Minister Yuval Steinitz." Fellow MK Isaac Herzog of the Labour party stated that "all efforts to encourage affordable housing construction in Tel Aviv fail due to the resistance of the Israeli Finance ministry, the Israel Lands Administration, the Israeli ministers and due to the position of the prime minister against government intervention of market prices," and that "it's time to examine an intervention." Herzog also stated that "you deserve not only to eat cottage, but also to build a cottage."
- Protest organizers and opposition MKs such as Shelly Yachimovich of the Labor Party dismissed Prime Minister Netanyahu's proposed reforms as "spin", and accused the Prime Minister of using the housing crisis as a cover to advance his program of land privatization. At the same time, green organizations have warned that Netanyahu's proposals would lead to the destruction of open spaces in the centre of the country by land developers, and the removal of community input into the land development process.
- Knesset Speaker Reuven Rivlin announced that it is necessary to keep a free market in Israel and to be careful that the protest activists won't lead Israel towards the path of destruction and anarchy.
- Israeli minister Benny Begin also criticized the protests, stating that it is a political struggle "with speech writers", aimed at overthrowing the Prime Minister of Israel, under the guise of protesting housing issues which "did not develop recently, and which would not be solved any time soon". Another government minister, Yuli Edelstein stated that among the organizers there are "anarchists associated with the Communist Party, Little foxes whom hang out along the protesters. They call Israel a fascist state, and this just shows how much they do not care for the protests."
- David Amar, the Mayor of Nesher, attacked the inhabitants of the encampment in Rothschild stating that "You're going through the Rothschild boulevard in at 1:30 am and all you can see is Hookahs and sushi. If they bring Sushi worth 35 NIS to the encampment – it indicates that their situation is not particularly difficult. This is not a protest".
- Knesset member Miri Regev stated that Daphne Leef "represents the extreme left". In response, Leef stated that she felt embarrassed about the violent confrontation which occurred during Regev's visit to the encampment; however, Leef emphasized that contrary to Regev's belief, the protests were first and foremost a social struggle and not a political one.
- On 20 July 2011, "Im Tirtzu" announced that they would not take part in the housing protests any more because they claimed that the New Israel Fund and various radical left-wing groups are directly involved in the housing protests. Officials in the organization stated that "Daphne Leef's struggle, who is perceived in the media as the initiator of the struggle, is actually a video editor working for the NIF and Shatil."
- In September 2011, Knesset member Aryeh Eldad said that 'there is no doubt that the extreme-left and post-Zionists are funding the protests. The thousands who are protesting their plight do not understand that they are marionettes in a game larger than housing costs and baby strollers'.
- Shimon Sheves, former General Director of the Office of the Prime Minister under Yitzhak Rabin and former Israeli Labor Party activist, confirmed that a new political party was being formed in the aftermath of the summer protests but refused to reveal names other than that it would be people from the National Left organization. Disenchanted with the Labor party, he affirmed that he would stand behind the new party.

=== Religious figures ===
- The prominent Israeli Modern Orthodox Rabbi Yuval Sherlo stated that in his opinion the protest movement has become anarchist in nature and therefore he personally finds it difficult to relate with it. He stated that the protest organizers need to change course: "After a big burst of justified pain and anger, without which the troubling issues would not have not been brought up on to the agenda, the protests have been exhausted". Sherlo stated that despite the wide public criticism raised against the Netanyahu government, "this government has done quite a few good things to promote employment, balance payments, and is responsible for the fact that Israel's macro-economic situation is quite good". Later on, Sherlo gave a speech in the movement's protest rally in Jerusalem in which he called on Prime Minister Netanyahu "to embrace these people".
- On 16 August 2011 prominent Israeli orthodox rabbi Israel Meir Lau, who is the former Ashkenazi Chief Rabbi of Israel and current Chief Rabbi of Tel Aviv, held a discussion on the ongoing protests with representatives from the National Union of Israeli Students at the offices of the Rabbinate in Tel Aviv. Lau noted that the protest movement is unprecedented in Israel, and added that "this is the first time I remember ever having seen this many people who didn't know each other before, coming together – outside of a time of war. You have captured my heart." In addition, Lau promised to contact Prime Minister Netanyahu personally and tell him to honor the mandate of the Trachtenberg committee and accept its recommendations.

=== Media ===
- Ben-Dror Yemini, an editor at Maariv, used his 26 August 2011 weekend column to report a strong left-wing turn of the protests that would attempt to connect the 'social justice' to the events leading up to anticipated September protests on the West Bank. Yemini revealed an agreement summarized after protest leaders met with left-wing leaders and anarchists including the heads of the National Left and Peace Now to discuss combining activities such as marches to the 'border' and to bring the Palestinians into the protest.
- Shay Golden, the assistant editor in chief of Maariv and former editor at the Haaretz newspaper has said that he has been made an enemy of the protests since he criticized the media coverage. He accused his media colleagues of forgetting their journalistic responsibilities and subsequently becoming spokespeople for the protests, and silencing opposing voices.
- Yair Lapid, a journalist and television personality who later served as Prime Minister in 2022, supported the protest since its first days. During the second week of the protest, he published an article in his weekly Yedioth Ahronoth column titled "The Slaves Revolt", inm which he sympathized with the protestors and implicitly blamed the Netanyahu government for its unjust allocation of resources.

== See also ==
- July 2019 Ethiopian Jews protest in Israel
- 15 October 2011 global protests
- 2010–2011 Greek protests
- 2011 Chilean protests
- Spanish 15M Indignants movement
- 2011 United Kingdom anti-austerity protests
- Impact of the Arab Spring
- Israeli housing crisis
- Iceland Kitchenware Revolution
- Occupy Wall Street
- Occupy movement
- Olim L'Berlin
- Protests of 1968
- List of protests in the 21st century
