= Israeli spring =

Israeli spring may refer to:

- 2011 Israeli social justice protests
- 2023 Israeli anti-judicial reform protests
