= Roee Neuman =

Israeli social and political activist

- רועי נוימן
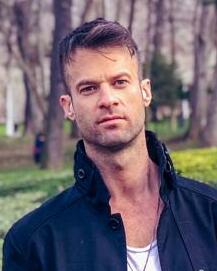
- Born: רועי נוימן; May 22, 1984 (age 42); Ness Ziona, Israel
- Occupation: Media consultant
- Known for: Social activism

Roee Neuman (Hebrew: רועי נוימן; born: May 22, 1984) is an Israeli social activist and media consultant. Neuman is a figure in the 2011 Israeli social justice protests, The Black Flag Protests since 2020, and the current Judicial Reform Protests against the Benjamin Netanyahu government.

== Career and social activism ==
Neuman is one of the leaders of the 2011 Israeli social justice protests. The protests began with the first tents being erected on July 14, 2011 on the edge of Rothschild Boulevard in Tel-Aviv near HaBima Theatre after an "event" posted by Daphni Leef on Facebook the previous week. Neuman served as spokesperson for the protests. For his actions, Neuman was awarded the "Dror Prize for Social Change".

After the protests, Neuman began working in public relations and media consulting. In 2012, he worked for the public relations firm "Legaia". The following year, he served as spokesperson for former Knesset member, Michal Rozin. He later served as spokesperson and public relations for the "One Voice" movement. In 2014 until the end of 2015 he served as Tzipi Livni's spokesperson as well as for her movement "Hatnua" within the "Zionist Union". In 2019, Neuman served in public relations and as spokesperson for "Democratic Union".

In 2018, Neuman was one of the founders and initiators of the LGBT protests and co-founder of the "Pink Panthers", an organization which spearheaded the protests against the surrogacy law which prevented surrogacy from male couples or single men following a supreme court ruling in the case of Arad-Pinkas vs. The Law Committee for Embryo Carriages.

Since 2019, Neuman accompanies the "Black Flag Protests" in all things media-related.

Neuman is an activist in the 2023 Israeli judicial reform protests and is among the prominent organizing members. During one of the protests, Neuman was detained and interrogated by police for a tweet against a policeman on horseback who whipped a fellow protester.

== Personal life ==
Neuman is openly gay and lives in Tel Aviv.
