= Habima Square =

Public space in midtown Tel Aviv, Israel

Coordinates: 32°04′23″N 34°46′46″E

- Public square
- Orchestra Plaza
- כיכר הבימה
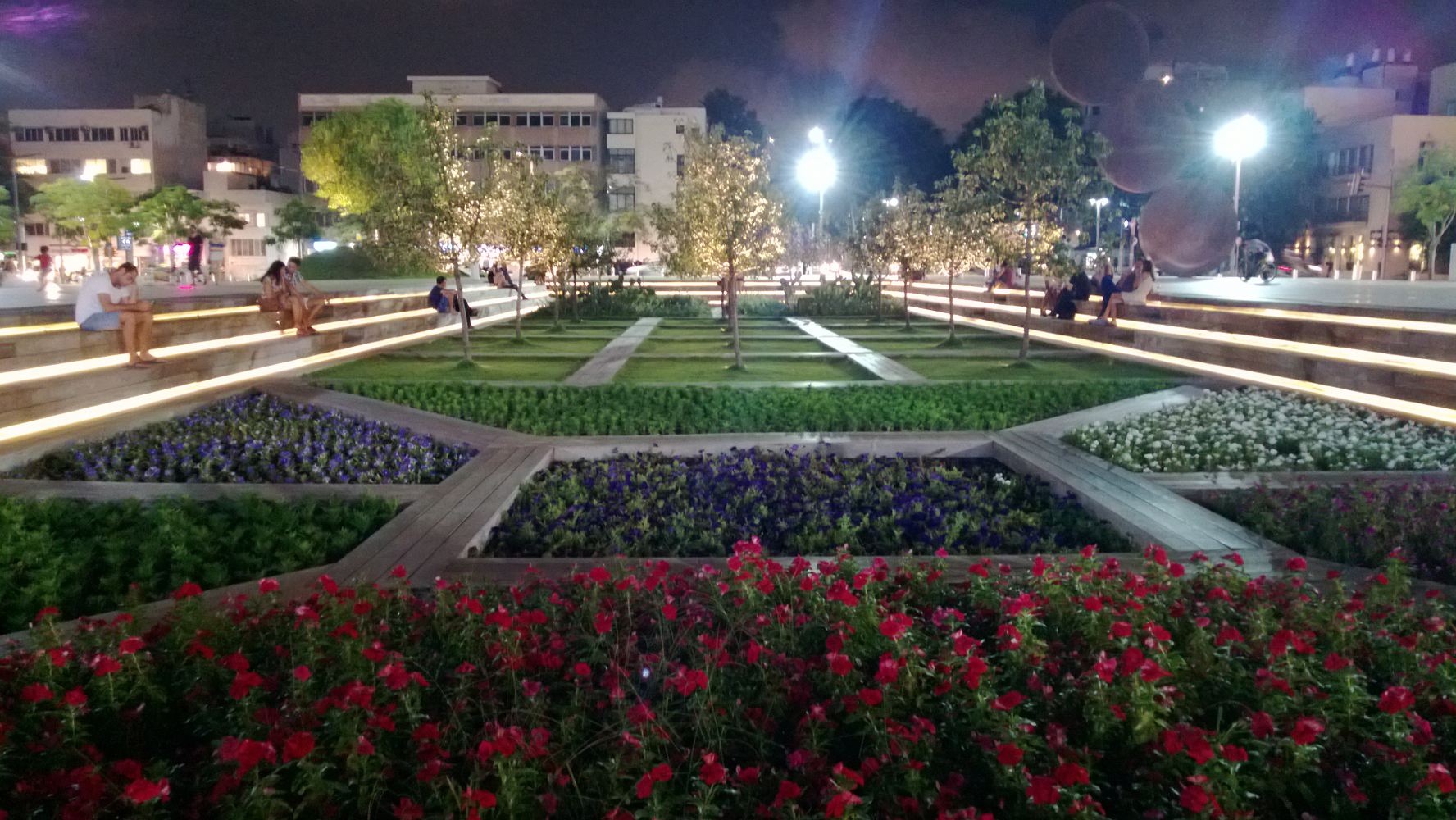
- Habima Square
- Design: Oscar Kaufman
- Opened: 1945
- Location: Tel Aviv, Israel
- Interactive map of Habima Square

Habima Square (Hebrew: כיכר הבימה, lit. 'The Stage's Square', also known as The Orchestra Plaza) is a major public space in the center of Tel Aviv, Israel, which is home to a number of cultural institutions such as the Habima Theatre, the Culture Palace, and the Helena Rubinstein Pavilion for Contemporary Art. The square is at the intersection of Rothschild Boulevard, Hen Boulevard, Dizengoff Street, and Ben-Zion Boulevard.

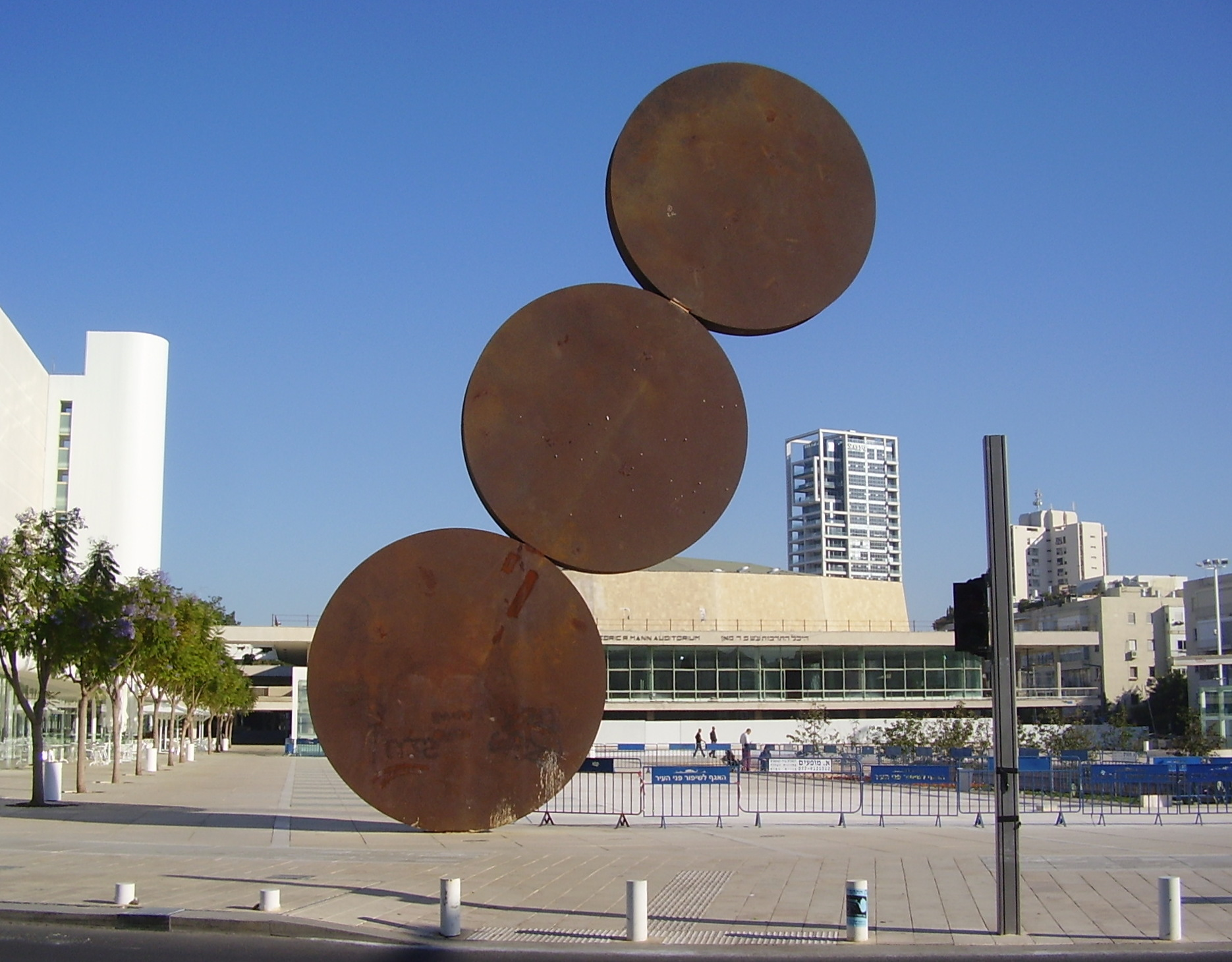
Uprise by Menashe Kadishman, 1967, with the Culture Palace in the background

== History ==
The idea to establish a cultural center was originally proposed in the Geddes Plan, the first master plan of Tel Aviv planned by Patrick Geddes in the late 1920s. Geddes envisioned a kind of a modern "Acropolis". In the Geddes plan, this would be the cultural core of Tel Aviv, while Dizengoff Square nearby would be a commercial center of a different character.

The cornerstone of Habima Theatre was laid in 1935. The building was planned by architect Oscar Kaufman in the International style and finished in 1945. The square was inaugurated next to the theatre, additional buildings being added only two decades later. Between the 1930s and the 1950s, the area housed an educational farm and urban nursery, with a grove of Sycamore trees. Most of the trees were eventually uprooted (causing public outrage) but two of the trees were integrated into the Ya'akov Garden.

On 28 June 1948, seven weeks after the Israeli Declaration of Independence, Tel Aviv was the temporary national capital of Israel while Jerusalem was under siege. On this day, the IDF was declared the national army, in the presence of the mayor Israel Rokach and the foreign minister Moshe Sharett at a ceremony that took place in the square.

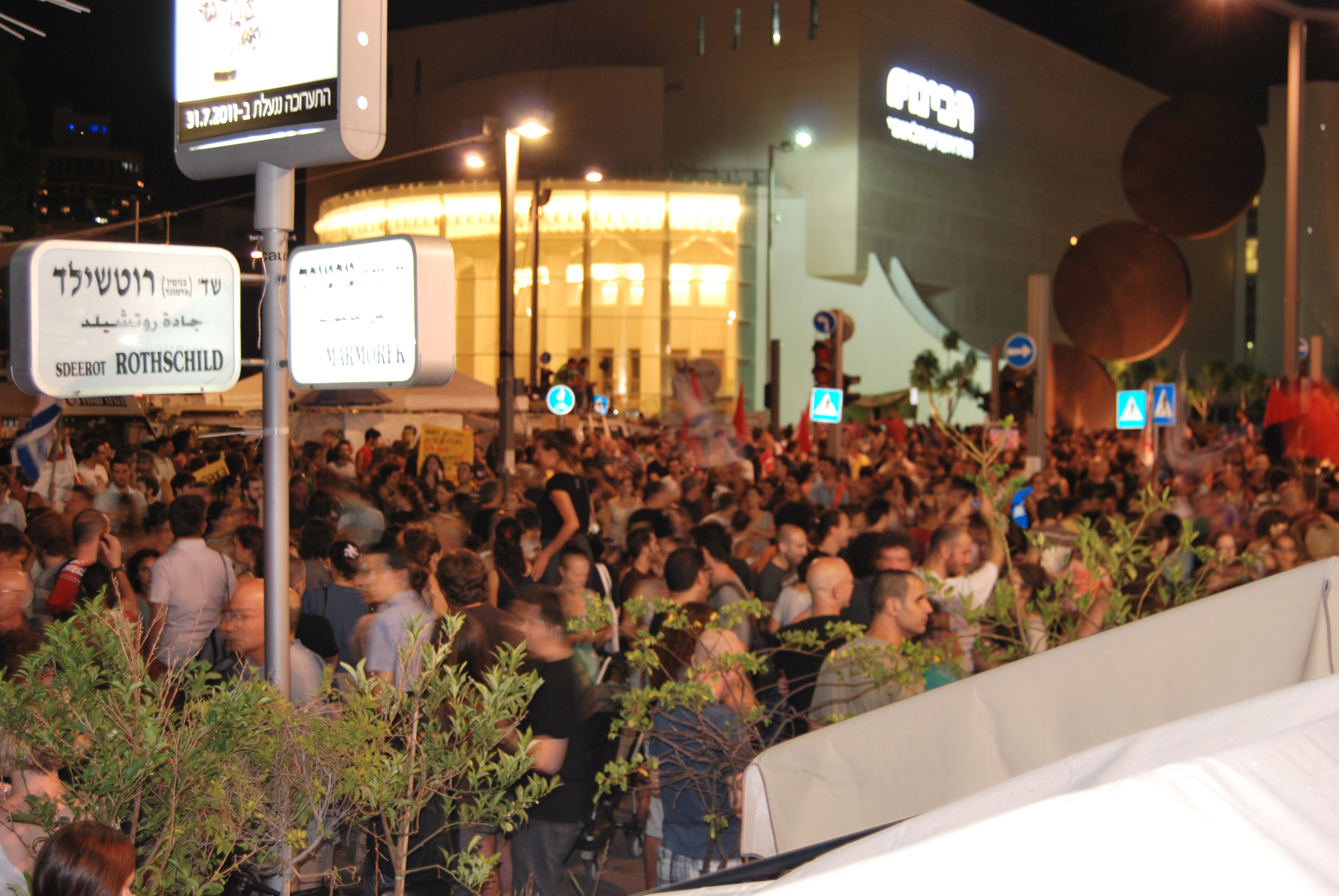
Housing protests at the square, 23 July 2011

The Helena Rubinstein Pavilion of Contemporary Art, planned by architects Dov Karmi, Ze'ev Rechter, and Ya'akov Rechter, was established in 1952. At the same time, the Fredric R. Mann Auditorium was constructed but inaugurated in 1957, as the home of the Israel Philharmonic Orchestra. When the auditorium was planned, an underground parking lot and an urban plaza were planned too, but due to budgetary considerations, only the northern area of the compound was developed as a plaza. Most of the compound area was used as a temporary parking lot.

A year after, Habima was declared the national theatre of Israel. Thus the importance of the compound as a national culture center was increased. In 1970, the theatre was renovated and a wall was built around the southern circular side of the entrance hall.

In July 2011 the square became a major focal point of the 2011 housing protests in Israel, when Daphne Leef pitched her tent there, followed by hundreds more.

The "Orange Carpet" event and the Opening Ceremony of the Eurovision Song Contest 2019 took place at the square on 12 May 2019.

== Renovation ==
A more comprehensive renovation by architect Dani Karavan was launched in 2007, encompassing both the Habima Theatre and the plaza. While most of the compound had previously served as a parking lot, the goal of the latest renovation was the construction of an underground lot, allowing the compound to serve as a big plaza. On 7 June 2010, the underground "Culture Parking Lot" was opened with an area of 40,000 m^{2} and 1,000 parking spaces.

In September 2010, the Ya'akov Garden renovation was completed. A ramp that had led to the garden's upper-balcony was demolished and Chen Boulevard was connected to the square. The renovation of Habima was completed In January 2011, with the renovation of the entire compound in April.

== Architecture properties ==
Habima Square buildings are a part of the White City of Tel Aviv. The buildings are built in the international style, and many buildings around the square which are also designed in the international style are intended for preservation as a part of the heritage site.

== See also ==
- Tomer White Glasses
