= Impact of the Arab Spring =

Political movements inspired by the Arab Spring

- Part of International reactions to the Arab Spring
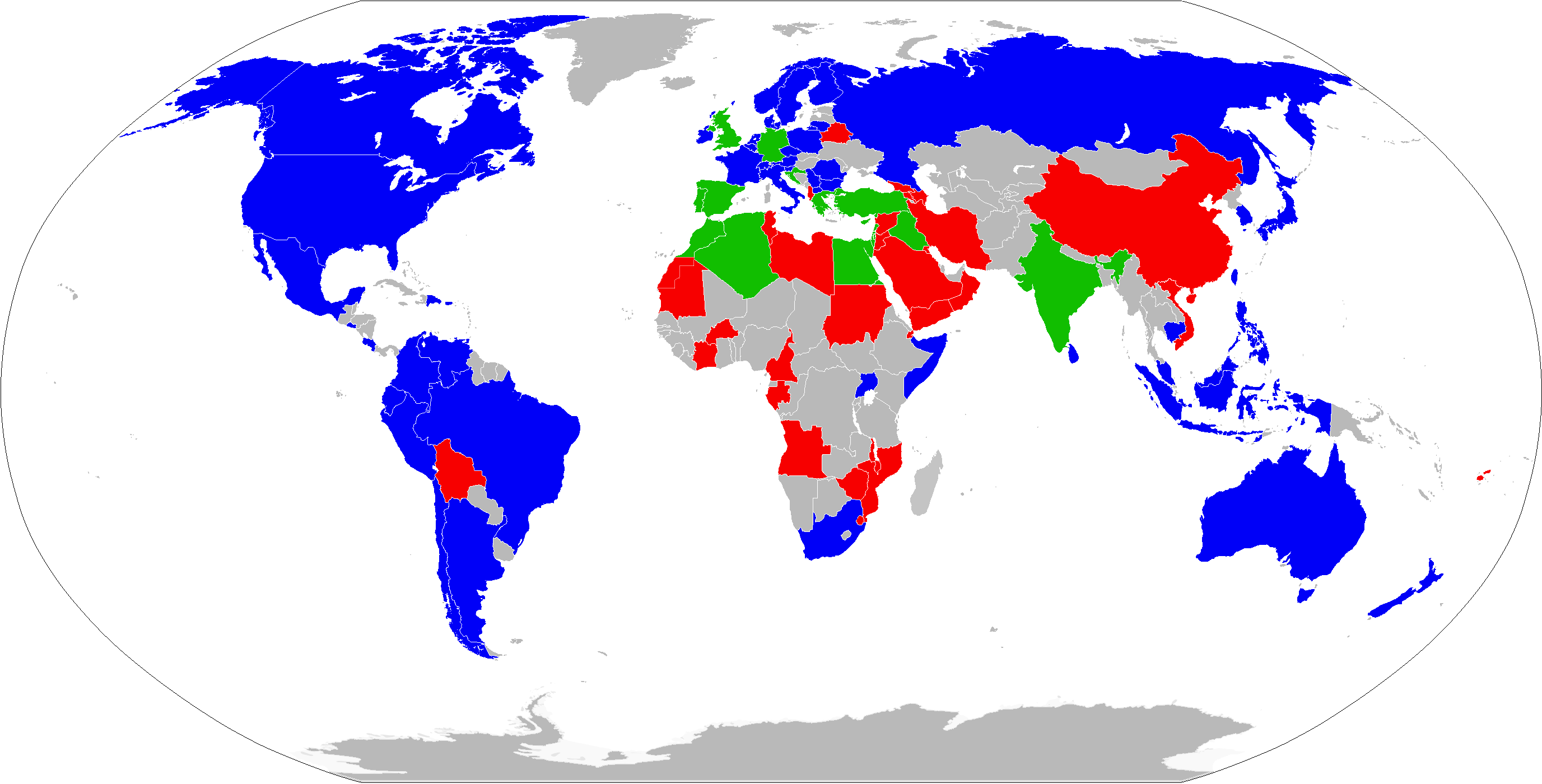
- Locations of global protests in 2011. Blue refers to Occupy movement protests, red refers to Arab spring and later protests, and green refers to protests inspired by the Arab Spring outside the Occupy movement.
- Date: Early 2011–2012
- Location: Worldwide outside the Arab countries
- Caused by: Arab Spring

The impact of the Arab Spring concerns protests or by the way attempts to organize growing protest movements that were inspired by or similar to the Arab Spring in the Arab-majority states of North Africa and the Middle East, according to commentators, organisers, and critics. These demonstrations and protest efforts have all been critical of the government in their respective countries, though they have ranged from calls for the incumbent government to make certain policy changes to attempts to bring down the current political system in its entirety. In some countries, protests have become large or widespread enough to effect change at the national level, as in Armenia, while in others, such as Djibouti, were swiftly suppressed.

Protests considered to be inspired by the Arab Spring have taken place on every inhabited continent, with varying degrees of success and prominence. On 15 October 2011, the subsidiary "Occupy" and Indignants movements inspired protests in 950 cities in 82 countries.

== Background ==
A number of popular protests by citizens against their governments occurred in nations around the world, both following and concurrently with the Arab Spring, and some of these were reported to have been inspired by events in the Arab World starting at the end of 2010, creating a network of diffusion.

Some potentially vulnerable states that have not yet seen such protests have taken a variety of preemptive measures to avoid such displays occurring in their own countries; some of these states and others have experienced political fallout as a result of their own governmental actions and reactions to events which their own citizens are seeing reported from abroad.

Government overthrown Civil war Sustained civil disorder and governmental changes Protests and governmental changes
Major/Large scale protests Minor protests

== Africa ==
=== Djibouti ===
On 2 February, demonstrations began when about three hundred people protested peacefully against President Ismail Omar Guelleh in Djibouti City, urging him to not run for another term; the protesters further asked for more liberty as well as for political and social reform. Protests soon increased, however, as thousands rallied against the president, a number of them vowing to remain at the site until their demands were met. On 18 February, an estimated 30,000 Dijiboutians protested in central Djibouti City against the president, maintaining that the constitutional change of the previous year, which allowed him a third term, was illegal. The demonstration escalated into clashes with the police, and at least two persons were killed and a number of people were injured when police used live ammunition and teargas against the protesters. On 19 and 24 February, protest leaders were arrested and after they failed to turn up on the 24th, opposition leader Bourhan Mohammed Ali stated he feared the protests had lost momentum. The last protest was planned for 11 March, but security forces stopped the protest and detained 4 opposition leaders. No protests or planned protests have occurred since.

=== Ivory Coast ===
In Côte d'Ivoire (Ivory Coast), peace activist Aya Virginie Toure organized thousands of women in multiple peaceful protests across the country. They were met by security forces with tanks that opened fire. In an impassioned interview on BBC News, Toure compared the Second Ivorian Civil War to the 2011 Libyan civil war and asked for support from the international community. She called for military intervention to remove Laurent Gbagbo from power.

Nigerian Foreign Minister Henry Odein Ajumogobia accused the international community of "contradictions" by imposing a no-fly zone over Libya and focusing on the civil war in Libya, but failing to take action to protect civilians in the Ivory Coast. Oil production in Libya is seen as a more strategic commodity than cocoa in the Ivory Coast, which influenced the international response to the turmoil facing both countries.

=== Gabon ===
On 29 January, riot police in Gabon fired tear gas to break up a protest by around 5,000 opposition supporters, where according to witnesses, up to 20 people were wounded. It was the second such protest since opposition leader Andre Mba Obame declared himself president on January 25 and urged people to take inspiration from the Tunisian Revolution. Obame subsequently hid out in the local United Nations Development Programme office, while President Ali Bongo Ondimba shut down TV stations and allegedly kidnapped members of the opposition. The UN is accusing Gabon's police of invading and beating students within the university. Although initial protests overwhelmingly consisted of opposition loyalists, the unrest appears to be developing into a wider social conflict, with students leading the protests.

=== Mali ===
A Tuareg rebellion in early 2012 that forced the armed forces of Mali, a West African country with significant holdings in the Sahara, to withdraw south of the line the National Movement for the Liberation of Azawad (MNLA) claimed as the Tuareg homeland's southwestern frontier by April. The conflict was exacerbated by a coup d'état by the Malian Armed Forces that forced President Amadou Toumani Toure from power and briefly installed a junta in Bamako, the capital. With government forces pushed to Mopti and southward by the MNLA and other armed groups, including Ansar Dine and the Movement for Oneness and Jihad in West Africa, the MNLA's secretary general, Bilal Ag Acherif, declared Azawad an independent state on 6 April 2012.

The Wall Street Journal, among other media outlets, has drawn a connection between the secular MNLA's vision for a democratic Azawad to the Arab Spring revolts, though as with a number of the uprisings in the Middle East, Islamist factions have contested this view of Azawad's future. Ansar Dine has called for sharia law throughout all of Mali, not just Azawad. The Azawadi declaration of independence has also faced significant pushback from the international community, with no state or international body recognising the de facto state and the Economic Community of West African States (ECOWAS) mulling options for an international military intervention against the rebels.

The rebellion and coup have been described as "fallout" from the Arab Spring, as the success of the Tuareg rebellion where it had failed in previous efforts throughout the 20th century has been attributed largely to heavy weaponry carted out of Libya by Tuareg fighters on either side of the Libyan Civil War in 2011.

=== Mozambique ===
According to Al Jazeera, a 2011 protest in Mozambique was related to the Arab Spring. An elite police unit crushed a workers' protest on 6 April, detaining a number of demonstrators and leaving several injured. At least one protester died as a result of the crackdown. The Mozambican Human Rights League called for an investigation and demanded the commander of the unit step down.

=== Uganda ===
Ugandan President Yoweri Museveni was declared the winner of Uganda's 2011 general election on 11 February amidst opposition denunciations. Kizza Besigye, the chairman of the opposition coalition finished second with 26.01% of the vote. Besigye warned that Uganda was ripe for an Egypt-style revolt after Museveni's more than two decades in power. The protesters failed to amass in large numbers because, as the Christian Science Monitor suggested, a failure to tally its own results through its own SMS system was disrupted by the government, who also arrested hundreds of opposition field agents. They also suggested that Besigye did not believe his own claim of sparking a revolution. With unrest growing at the rising prices of food and fuel, the arrest of Kizza Besigye on 28 April was the catalyst for protests and riots across the Ugandan capital, Kampala, in which two were killed.

=== Zimbabwe ===
Munyaradzi Gwisai, a former opposition member of the Parliament of Zimbabwe, organised a meeting to discuss the uprisings in North Africa on 21 February. He, along with 45 others, were arrested and allegedly tortured and face a charge of treason that carries the death penalty. Zimbabwean migrants to South Africa, who number in the hundreds of thousands, are free to talk of the events. However, past violence in elections and a number of the youth and educated middle classes having fled the country there were questions about the pool of protesters to carry out such actions.

A Million Citizen March called for in Harare on 1 March went unheeded after a heavy police presence since 26 February continued and a curfew was declared on the night of 28 February.

== Europe ==
=== Greece ===
2010–12 Greek protests were a series of demonstrations and general strikes taking place across Greece. Greek protesters had taken its lead from the Arab spring.

=== Russia ===
In March 2012 Sergei Mironov, running in the 2012 Russian presidential election, said that: "Whoever wins the presidency, if he does not immediately begin deep political and social reforms [...] Russia will be shaken by a kind of Arab Spring within two years." The Telegraph pointed out that since Mironov is a former ally of Vladimir Putin, he could have been trying to scaremonger "as a subtle way of endorsing a crackdown on street demonstrations that are expected in the days after the vote".

Imprisoned oligarch Mikhail Khodorkovsky has claimed that the protests which followed the 2011 Russian elections were inspired by the example of the Arab Spring. He told the Guardian newspaper, "We have only to reflect on the events in countries swept up in the Arab Spring to recognise the transformation taking place in the compact between the rulers and the ruled. While there are certainly differences between those countries and Russia, there are some fundamental similarities."

=== Turkey ===
In Turkey supporters of the Peace and Democracy Party (BDP), the main pro-Kurdish party, have demonstrated against the Justice and Development Party (AKP) government before and after the general elections.

In 2013, protesters started a stand in a silent protest at Gezi Park, opposing a plan allegedly demolishing the park. The police intervention sparked bigger anti-government protests. The protesters included multiple leftists, including CHP and BDP party supporters.

=== Ukraine ===
The term "Ukrainian Spring" is sometimes used in reference to the Arab Spring, which was triggered by similar causes such as heavy-handed authoritarianism, widespread official corruption, kleptocracy, and lack of opportunity.

== Asia ==
=== Armenia ===
Regional unrest reached Armenia in January as merchants protested a ban on street trading in Yerevan, the former Soviet socialist republic's capital. Protesters marched in front of municipal offices and called for Mayor Karen Karapetyan to "come down", demanding that the ban be lifted. Seizing on this rising discontent in the capital city, the Armenian National Congress, led by former President Levon Ter-Petrosian, started organizing larger, more sharply politicized rallies in Yerevan in February. Rallies have drawn tens of thousands and have continued through April. Protesters demand the release of political prisoners, socio-economic reforms, full access to Yerevan's Freedom Square, and that perpetrators of violence against opposition supporters in the wake of the 2008 presidential election be brought to justice.

The government has made three major concessions: agreeing to revive and step up a hereto stagnant investigation of the 2008 protest deaths, opening Freedom Square to political rallies from 28 April forward, and issuing a general amnesty covering jailed activists the opposition considers to be political prisoners. President Serzh Sargsyan said in late April that he believed in cooperation between the government and the opposition and that his government was willing to make the "first steps" toward a compromise.

=== Azerbaijan ===
Youth activists and opposition leaders, inspired by events of the Arab Spring, called for demonstrations on 11 and 12 March. The government responded with a crackdown on gatherings and widespread detentions. Reuters reported that at least 150 activists were arrested in Azerbaijan during March. Police arrested close to 300 demonstrators in April, detaining at least four journalists covering the incident as well. Dozens more protesters, including at least one journalist who was later released, were arrested in May.

=== China ===
China unintentionally played a role in the Arab Spring due to the effects of a winter wheat crop failure and a massive Chinese drought that occurred in January 2011. This massive drought led the Chinese to buy wheat on the international market, henceforth doubling prices and leading to civil unrest in Egypt – the world’s largest wheat importer. Egypt’s geography and population size have led to their dependence on international wheat imports. China’s domestic efforts to alleviate the drought had serious repercussions in Egypt, where food riots spurred further civil unrest. These food riots weakened government legitimacy and destabilized the country. This served as a stepping-stone for subsequent civil unrest in Egypt.

There were calls made via social networks such as Twitter to begin a "Jasmine Revolution" in China. Chinese authorities arrested activists, increased the normal police presence, disabled some cell phone text messaging services and deleted Internet postings about protests planned for 14:00 on 20 February in Beijing, Shanghai and 11 other cities. On the day of the protests, the police turned out en masse to all of the potential protest locations in various cities around the country. Small crowds, including a large number of foreign journalists, gathered at the planned site in Beijing and Shanghai but did not chant slogans or hold signs. CPC General Secretary and President Hu Jintao responded by calling top Chinese Communist Party leaders into a "study session" to root out and tackle social issues before they "become threats to stability". In a speech at the Central Party School, Hu called out for tighter restrictions to the internet.

Chinese Premier Wen Jiabao promised to curb inflation and punish corruption in what was seen as an attempt to curb protests. He also promised to boost food supplies and to control surging property prices. A heavy police presence was also reported in planned protest cities of Beijing and Shanghai. He said that fighting inflation was an important economic priority in order to curb social unrest.

During an interview given to Jeffrey Goldberg of The Atlantic, Hillary Clinton responded to Goldberg's comment: "Chinese government seemed scared of the Arab rising": "Well, they are. They're worried, and they are trying to stop history, which is a fool's errand. They cannot do it. But they're going to hold it off as long as possible."

==== Tibetan government-in-exile ====
In March 2011, the 14th Dalai Lama Tenzin Gyatso announced that he would step down from his political office as the leader of the Tibetan government-in-exile, making way for the election of a prime minister. The move was read of splitting the political and religious authority of the Tibetan leadership-in-exile. He called the rule of Tibetan Buddhist spiritual leaders "outdated" and added: "I do not want to be like Mubarak." An election took place on 20 March 2011 and the new prime minister of the Tibetan government-in-exile is Lobsang Sangay.

=== Iraqi Kurdistan ===
Protests broke out in Iraqi Kurdistan, an autonomous region of Iraq, on 21 February. They continued until martial law was declared in late April and the Peshmerga, supported by the regular Iraqi Army, was deployed to quell the unrest.

=== Iran ===
On 9 February, various Iranian opposition groups requested permission from the Ministry of Interior to protest under the supervision of the Iranian police. Permission was refused. Despite this setback, along with crackdowns on activists and members of opposition parties, opposition leaders such as Mir Hossein Mousavi and Mehdi Karroubi called for nationwide protest marches to begin on 14 February.

Rumours suggested that the protesters would include university students, lorry drivers, and gold merchants from across the country, who were protesting under the umbrella opposition known as the Green movement the re-emergence of which had been inspired by the recent events in Egypt and Tunisia. The Islamic Revolutionary Guard Corps promised to forcefully confront protesters, and opposition activists and aides to Mousavi and Karroubi were arrested in the days leading up to the demonstrations.

Estimates of the number of protesters ranged from 'thousands' to 'hundreds of thousands', depending on the source.

Reports from the demonstrations described clashes between protesters and security forces in Tehran. As part of the government strategy, security forces of approximately 10,000 personnel were deployed to prevent protesters from gathering at Azadi Square, where the marches that had originated in Enghelab, Azadi, and Vali-Asr streets were expected to converge. Police reportedly fired tear gas and used pepper spray and batons to disperse protesters. Protesters responded by setting fires in garbage bins.

Clashes were also reported in Isfahan.

=== Israel ===
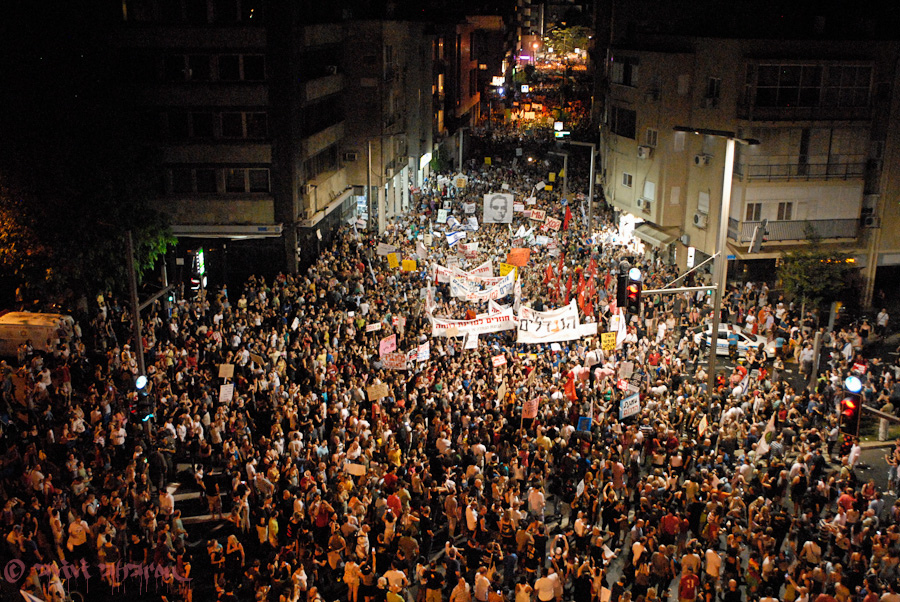
Israeli protests, July 2011

The 2011 Israeli housing protests (Hebrew: מחאת הדיור or מחאת הנדל"ן or מחאת האוהלים) were a series of street demonstrations held throughout Israel from 14 July to 29 October 2011. The protests included the largest demonstration held in Israel up to that point, which took place on September 3, 2011 and had 460,000 protesters throughout the country, including 300,000 protestors in Tel Aviv alone. The protests began after a Facebook protest group led hundreds of people to camp in tents in the center of Tel Aviv on Rothschild Boulevard. The movement soon gained momentum and began a public discourse in Israel regarding the high cost of housing and living expenses. The protests quickly spread to other cities in Israel as thousands of Israeli protesters began camping in tents in the middle of central streets as a means of protest. The protesters objected to increases in housing prices in Israel, especially in the country's major cities.

Media and scholarly research suggested that the protests were inspired by the Arab Spring, The Israeli protests were generally non-violent.

=== Malaysia ===
On 9 June 2011, Malaysians protested in Kuala Lumpur against electoral fraud perpetrated by the ruling party Barisan Nasional. Barisan Nasional and its predecessor, Parti Perikatan (the Alliance Party), has been Malaysia's federal ruling force since independence from the British in 1957.

=== Maldives ===
Early on 1 May 2011, protests began in the Maldives as thousands of protesters demonstrated in Male demanding that President Mohamed Nasheed step down. Police were sent in to break up the protests. Dozens were injured and a number of people were arrested during the demonstrations. Protests continued the following day too. The main causes for the protests were soaring food prices and rising unemployment. The main opposition party in the nation, the DRP (Maldivian People's Party), said that "currency devaluation has increased the price of essentials". Protests continued for a week but temporarily died down.

Protests again began late in the year and led to the resignation of the president in February 2012 which is debated amongst legal experts and in the diplomatic arena as a coup. A report by an independent team of international lawyers and human rights experts headed by Associate Professor of International Law at Copenhagen University Anders Henriksen is available.

=== Myanmar ===
A protest campaign to "attempt to emulate the democratic revolution in Egypt that was sparked by a Facebook campaign" started in Myanmar on 13 February 2011, coordinating via a Facebook page titled "Just Do It Against Military Dictatorship". Anti-government material was distributed in several places around the country, including Mandalay and Taunggyi. More than 1000 activists support the campaign. An intense series of anti-government street protests had earlier taken place from September to November 2007.

=== North Korea ===
The South Korean military dropped leaflets with information about the protests in Egypt and Libya into North Korea, in an attempt to induce political change in its northern neighbor, with whom it has technically been at war (the Korean War ended in an armistice without a peace treaty) since the 1950s. North Korea threatened to take military action if South Korea continued to drop leaflets fomenting revolt, the Korean Central News Agency reported. According to reports in the South Korean media, there have been small pockets of protests in North Korea. North Korea responded internally by censoring all news of the Arab Spring, banning all public demonstrations, and stationing Korean People's Army tanks in Kim Il-sung Square, Pyongyang.

=== Vietnam ===
Nguyen Dan Que, a prominent critic of the Vietnamese government, was arrested on 26 February 2011 because security services said he was caught "red-handed keeping and distributing documents" that called for the overthrow of the government in a Middle East-style uprising. On 5 June, nearly a thousand people marched against China in Hanoi and Ho Chi Minh City over the South China Sea dispute. This is one of the largest and most prominent public protest that is not condoned by the government in history of communist Vietnam.

== The Americas ==
Starting with the February protests in Wisconsin a number of Arab Spring inspired movements have waxed and waned in both Americas, some being violent, others not. On 15 October, there were thousands of demonstrations throughout the two continents, some in countries such as Canada, which had not suffered such unrest before.

=== Bolivia ===
On 10 February the President of Bolivia, Evo Morales, cancelled an appearance at a public event in Oruro due to fears over riots after protesters angry about rising food prices and Morales' style of government reportedly planted explosives there. Morales was said to be "on guard" in the wake of the Tunisian and Egyptian uprisings according to United Press International. Protests against the president were also reported in several of the country's major cities. On 29 September, thousands of people marched to protest Morales' attacks on indigenous people over highway construction. He later apologized.

From the 28th April onwards, indigenous peoples in Bolivia protested against the construction of the Villa Tunari – San Ignacio de Moxos Highway.

=== Brazil ===
Brazil witnessed minor protests associated with the Occupy Movement during 2011 and 2012, but then endogenous social events and discourses led to massive and widespread protest during June 2013. While not directly sparked by the events in the Arab world, a new generation of Brazilians saw themselves in a similar situation as the Arab youth: alienated and marginalized from government and other public institutions, suffering increasingly high costs of living and inaccessible social services, and finding fewer employment and other social opportunities. Most significantly, the media exposure of popular protests taking over streets and overthrowing governments provided a new generation of Brazilians with the idea that popular uprisings can indeed be highly successful. The 2013 protests in Brazil are ongoing public demonstrations in several Brazilian cities, initiated mainly by the Movimento Passe Livre (Free Fare Movement), a local entity that advocates for free public transportation. The demonstrations were initially organized to protest against increases in bus, train, and metro ticket prices in some Brazilian cities, but grew to include other issues such as the high corruption in the government and police brutality used against some demonstrators. By the end of June 2013, the movement had grown to become Brazil's largest since the 1980s movement against the military dictatorship and for direct elections, called Diretas Já. It is notable that popular and working class organizations established during the 1980s - such as the ruling Workers' Party (PT), the Unified Workers Central (CUT), and the Landless Rural Workers Movement (MST) - did not play any role leading these protests, and in fact most street protesters do not find themselves represented by the Workers' Party government of Dilma Rousseff.

=== Mexico ===
Mass demonstrations have occurred against Mexican President Felipe Calderón, calling for an end to the Mexican drug war, citing inspiration from the Egyptian Revolution of 2011.

In May 2012 students and other youth, supported by farmers and unionized workers began a protest against the Institutional Revolutionary Party, the former ruling party, and their presidential candidate, Enrique Peña Nieto. Their chief grievance is the claim that, in their coverage of the 2012 Mexican presidential election, the national television duopoly Televisa and TV Azteca have been biased towards Peña Nieto, who leads the polls with one month to go When their protest was dismissed as paid for and ignored by the Mexican mass media, hundreds protested in front of Televisa's studios, and at least 46,000 people responded by taking their protest to Mexico City's main avenue. The protest movement use the slogan Yo Soy 132 - "I am 132", which echos the Occupy movement's slogan "We are the 99%". The protest movement has also been described as "the Mexican Spring" in local media.

=== United States ===
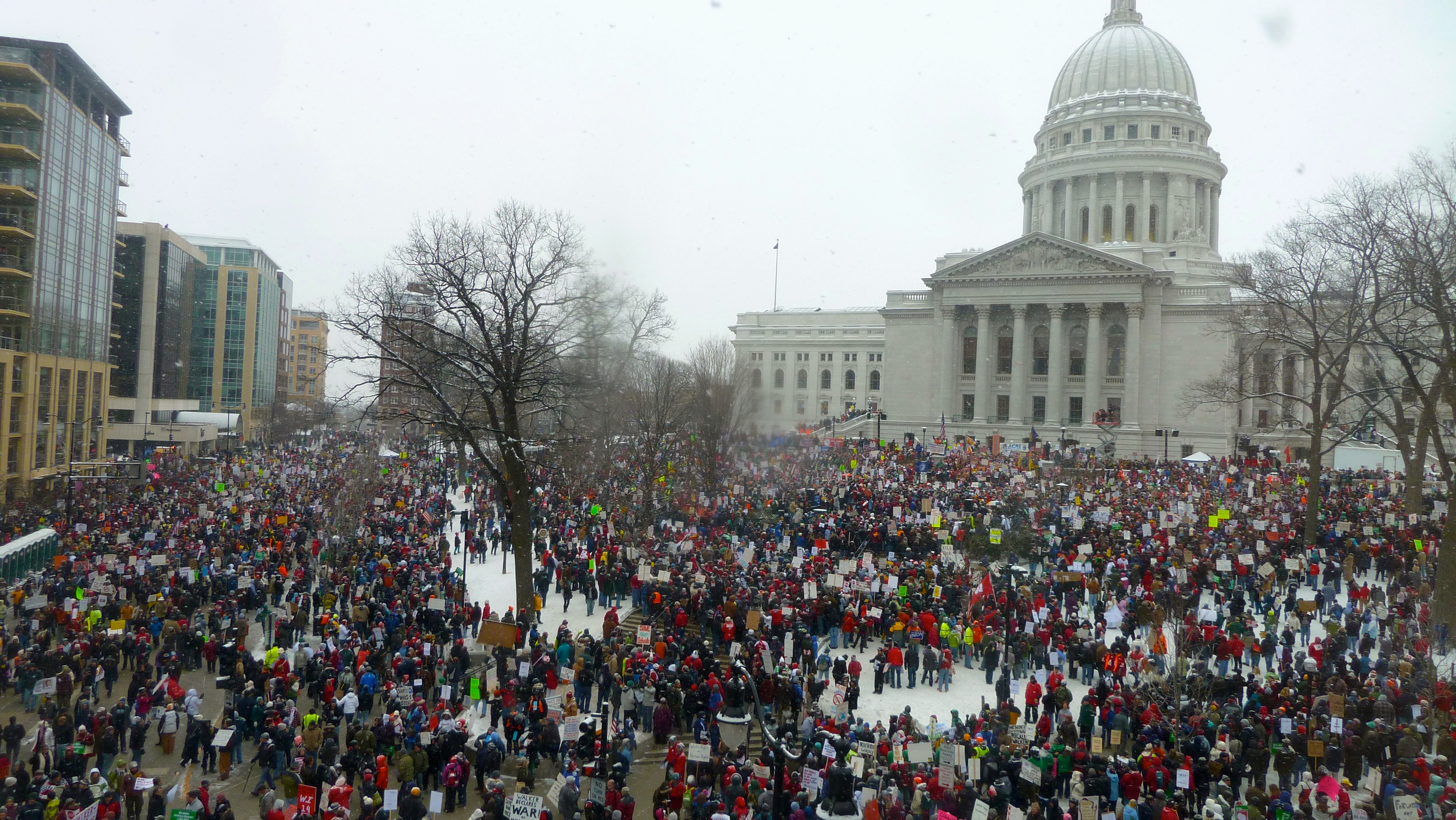
Thousands gather outside of the Wisconsin Capitol building to protest Governor Walker's bill. The gathering is estimated at 70,000 to 100,000 people.

A series of demonstrations took place in the United States, starting on 14 February 2011 and continuing as of 12 March 2011, involving tens of thousands of protestors including union members, students, and other citizens. The protests main aims relate to collective bargaining legislation and took place mainly around the Wisconsin State Capitol, located in Madison, Wisconsin, with smaller protests in the cities of Milwaukee and Green Bay, at various university campuses including the University of Wisconsin–Madison and the University of Wisconsin–Milwaukee, and spread to another US state capital, Columbus, Ohio.

The protests were considered to be inspired by the 2011 Egyptian revolution by the chairman of the United States House Committee on the Budget, Paul Ryan and the Late-2000s recession. Linguist Noam Chomsky said that the Wisconsin protests and the Egyptian revolution "are closely intertwined", and that both consist of "struggles for labor rights and democracy". Mike Lux, a political consultant, stated that some of the protestors in Wisconsin and Ohio carried Egyptian flags and that "the pictures we are seeing and the story playing out in Wisconsin is like Egypt in some really important ways. The new mass militancy ... is a mass movement spreading like wildfire, building in momentum day by day."

On September 17, 2011, protests called "Occupy Wall Street" sprung up around New York City's financial district Wall Street. The protests responded to recent government bailouts for financial institutions and the growing income inequality in America during the Great Recession. This movement would come to be called the "Occupy" movement, which have sprung up in cities across the United States and in some countries around the world.

== Oceania ==
=== Fiji ===
The New Zealand branch of human rights group Amnesty International reported that soldiers in the archipelago state of Fiji, under military rule since the 2006 Fijian coup d'état, were increasingly resorting to beatings, abuse, and even torture to enforce order, allegedly detaining and abusing opposition members, unionists, and youth activists for planning a protest against the junta in late February. Amnesty CEO Patrick Holmes said he believed the more violent tactics are intended to thwart a Middle East-inspired uprising against the junta in Fiji. A Fiji pro-democracy group based in Sydney called for an international response to the alleged crackdown, comparing the situation in Fiji to the situation in Libya. On 7 March, The Australian reported that a former government minister declared his intent to seek asylum in Australia, claiming Fiji soldiers had detained and tortured him. The Fiji military has denied this, with a highly placed officer telling Radio Australia that soldiers only use "some minimal force" when making arrests and denying any knowledge of either planned protests or martial action in response on the part of the military or police. One expert on Fiji politics told Radio New Zealand that he believed unrest within the Republic of Fiji Military Forces was a greater threat to Commodore Frank Bainimarama's rule than popular protests like those in Tunisia and Egypt, but said it was hard to know what the junta's thinking was. New Zealand Foreign Minister Murray McCully said his government was seeking more information on the alleged beatings, echoing concerns expressed by the Australian government. The Fiji Human Rights Commission said that while it hasn't received any recent complaints directly, it is monitoring the situation and trying to check up on published allegations.

== Censorship and preemptive actions ==
=== Ethiopia ===
Following Ben Ali's flight from Tunisia, the Ethiopian government said there would be a cap on the prices of essential foods.

Journalist Eskinder Nega was warned after he wrote about the events in Egypt. He was subsequently imprisoned for criticising human rights abuses in Ethiopia.

=== Equatorial Guinea ===
The government of Teodoro Obiang, who has ruled the Equatorial Guinea for 32 years, censored news about the protests.

=== Eritrea ===
The state-owned news agency censors news about the events. Independent media has been banned since 2001.

=== Kazakhstan ===
On 31 January 2011, Kazakhstan's President Nursultan Nazarbayev decided to scrap a referendum which would have handed him a third decade in power by skipping elections due in 2012 and 2017. Nazarbayev supported the Constitutional Council's ruling that such a referendum would be unconstitutional and called an early election to be held on 3 April 2011. He also planned to offer the citizens of Kazakhstan discounted shares in some key national companies as part of a series of "People's IPOs" saying that "This is an event of paramount importance to the state...The whole world is earning money on stock markets and citizens of Kazakhstan should also learn how to do this." However, some critics suggested this was "window dressing", saying Nazarbayev merely was trying to deflect claims that too much wealth was controlled by a "corrupt, ruling elite." News media in South Africa have warned of a possible "Egypt effect" in Russia and the former Soviet Union.

=== Nigeria ===
The media in Nigeria speculated that similar events could take place there as the Movement for the Emancipation of the Niger Delta in the south or Boko Haram in the north could exploit the "distortions within the Nigerian system, and the anger of an aggrieved segment of the populace." In the first week of February Boko Haram also threatened the Nigerian government that it would carry out a "full scale war."

=== Turkmenistan ===
At least one well-regarded political analyst (published by Foreign Policy and Radio Free Europe/Radio Liberty) said that conditions in the Central Asian republic of Turkmenistan were similar enough to those in countries currently experiencing protests and revolts that the autocratic government of President Gurbanguly Berdimuhamedov appears worried by the precedent of revolutions in North Africa and major political concessions in several Western Asian states. Berdimuhamedov's regime has censored all news of the protests and governmental changes. There have also been some credible reports of Turkmenistani authorities attempting to keep tabs on all citizens both inside and outside the country, with Turkmenistanis whom the government judges to have spent too much time abroad allegedly warned they could be barred either from returning to their home country, or from leaving again once they do return.

=== Uzbekistan ===
The Uzbekistani government embraced a set of parliamentary reforms in late March that will grant the Legislative Chamber of the Supreme Assembly, a democratically elected body, a stronger ability to check the power of the prime minister by allowing it to call a motion of no confidence, as well as empowering both houses of the Supreme Assembly to "demand information" from the executive branch, according to one Uzbekistani senator involved with the reform initiative. At least one prominent political analyst at an Interior Ministry-affiliated university in Tashkent said the reforms were inspired by recent revolutionary events in the Middle East and Kyrgyzstan, asserting that democratization and government accountability and not violence are the means to forestalling popular upheaval.

== Political fallout ==
=== France ===
On 28 February 2011 French Foreign Minister Michele Alliot-Marie resigned after a month of pressure following allegations she offered French military assistance to ousted Tunisian President Zine El Abidine Ben Ali and that she vacationed in Tunisia during the unrest.

=== Israel ===
As the protests in Egypt began, Israel Defense Forces Intelligence Chief Aviv Kochavi stated the Egyptian government was not in danger of collapsing.

=== United Kingdom ===
The London School of Economics' Howard Davies resigned over the institution's monetary support from Libya.

=== United States ===
President Barack Obama, Defense Secretary Robert Gates, CIA Director Leon Panetta, Secretary of State Hillary Clinton, and other high-ranking officials and government agencies were caught by surprise over the uprisings, accused of presiding over a massive intelligence failure and being caught "flat footed." Panetta, Deputy Secretary of State Jim Steinberg, Director of Intelligence James Clapper, and FBI Director Robert Mueller appeared before the 112th Congress's first House Permanent Select Committee of Intelligence hearing to testify about Egypt.

== See also ==
- 15 October 2011 global protests
- 2011 Wisconsin protests
- Civil resistance
- Freedom in the World
- 2009 Icelandic financial crisis protests
- 2010–12 Greek protests
- 2011–12 Spanish protests
- 2011 United Kingdom anti-austerity protests
- Occupy Wall Street
- Occupy movement
- Protests of 1968
- Revolutionary wave
- Internet outage
- Internet manipulation
