= Savion =

Savion is a given name. Notable people with the name include:

- Savion Einstein, Israeli screenwriter
- Savion Flagg (born 1999), American basketball player
- Savion Glover (born 1973), American dancer and actor
- Savion Hiter, American football player
- Savion Washington (born 2002), American football player
- Savion Williams (born 2001), American football player

== See also ==
- Savyon, a town in Israel
