= Meir Einstein =

Israeli sports broadcaster (1951–2017)

- מאיר איינשטיין
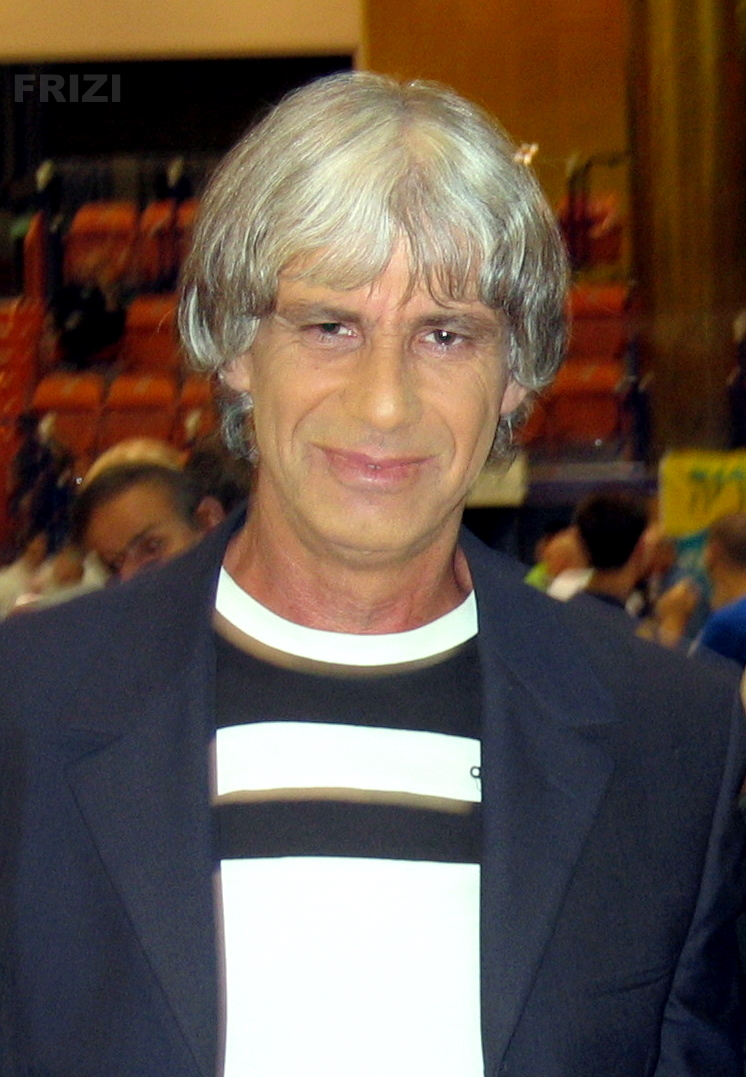
- Einstein in 2004
- Born: 21 October 1951; Herzliya, Israel
- Died: 23 March 2017 (aged 65); Herzliya, Israel
- Occupations: Sports broadcaster; journalist
- Children: 2, including Savion Einstein

Meir Einstein (Hebrew: מאיר איינשטיין; 21 October 1951 – 23 March 2017) was an Israeli sports broadcaster. He was born in Herzliya, Israel, and died in his home after a struggle with muscular dystrophy.

== Career ==
Einstein began his career as a news anchor at Kol Yisrael. He later began to broadcast sports events in all areas of the Sports Department of Channel 1. Among other things, Einstein broadcast the main soccer games of the Sabbath, the basketball games of Maccabi Tel Aviv in Europe and the Israeli soccer and basketball teams.

In 2002, Einstein switched to a sports broadcast on Channel 10. He broadcast, among other things, the national team and Premier League soccer matches, with the commentator Ran Ben Shimon. Afterward, Shlomo Scharf, former coach of the Israeli national team, took the lead. Einstein and Ran Ben-Shimon also co-directed the Double Pass program together with journalist Emmanuel Rosen. From time to time Einstein also broadcast the Premier League basketball games.

Einstein was the main broadcaster on the sports channels of Charlton Ltd., broadcast the Saturday edition of the press gallery on the sports channel and broadcast major events on Channel 1.

In December 2016, Einstein announced during his program on the sports channel "Saturday in the gallery" that he is dealing with a medical injury to the muscular system, so he uses a wheelchair and his pace of speech is slower than usual. In its obituary, The Jerusalem Post reported he was suffering from muscular dystrophy.
