= The National Left =

- Ha'Smol Ha'Leumi
- Purpose: restore the Left's influence on Israel's political agenda

The National Left (Hebrew: השמאל הלאומי - Ha'Smol Ha'Leumi) is an Israeli political movement striving to express the classic values of Zionism and the Israeli Left in face of the dwindling electoral success of left-wing parties in recent decades: "...Our great and Zionist national Left, who wants, just like Binyamin Ze'ev Herzl, David Ben-Gurion and Yitzhak Rabin, a Jewish democratic state with recognizable and defendable borders, an exemplary, model society, and social justice" (translated from The National Left site).

The movement was created on the foundation of "The National Left, a first draft", a 2009 manifesto by playwright Shmuel Hasfari and attorney Eldad Yaniv describing the state of the Israeli Left and the potential dangers of continued Israeli presence in the West Bank territories, and attempting to restore the Left's influence on Israel's political agenda by promoting a pragmatic agenda based on the values of the Left, an Israeli pullout from the West Bank and an end to the Israeli–Palestinian conflict, and turning the Israeli society into a "model society". The book was criticized for its harsh denouncement of settlers and the settlement enterprise, and its distribution by bookstore chain Tzomet Sfarim was stopped, following pressure by right-wing sources.

On May 15, 2010, the movement held a rally in Jerusalem under the banner "Zionists do not settle". The demonstration was organized by The National Left, Peace Now and other left-wing organizations.
