= Shimon Sheves =

- שמעון שבס
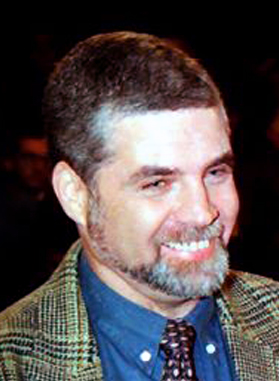
- Born: March 16, 1952 (age 74); Petah Tikva, Israel
- Education: University of New Haven, Business and Public Administration
- Occupations: Founder and President of RSLB

Shimon Sheves (Hebrew: שמעון שבס; born 16 March 1952, Petah Tikva, Israel) is an Israeli Politician who served as the General Director of the Israeli Prime Minister's office under Yizhak Rabin from 1992 to 1995. Sheves now serves as a political strategic advisor to governments and political leaders around the world. He was Chairman of RSLB, a company owned jointly by Sheves, former Israel Defense Forces (IDF) Chief of Staff the late Amnon Lipkin-Shahak, Yuval Rabin, son of Yitzhak Rabin and Israeli businessman Gil Berger.

== Politics ==
Sheves began his political career in local politics on the Golan Heights. He was the founder, Secretary and Farm Director of an Afik, Chairman of the Golan Heights Economic Development Company, Chairman of the Golan Heights Settlements Committee and the Deputy to the Head of the Golan Regional Council.

In 1984, Sheves began his long relationship with Rabin when the latter, then the Minister of Defense of Israel, appointed him as his personal and political assistant. Sheves filled that role for six years, and during that time he was in charge of the Jewish settlements on the West Bank and of developing national infrastructure.

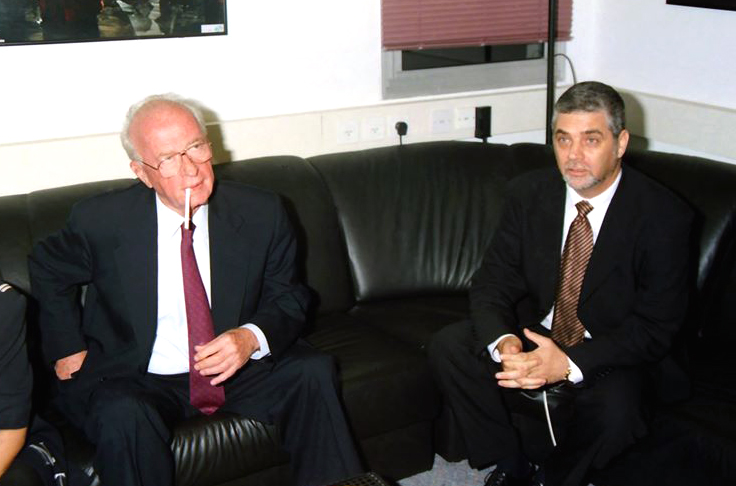
PMO Shimon Sheves and Prime Minister Yitzhak Rabin

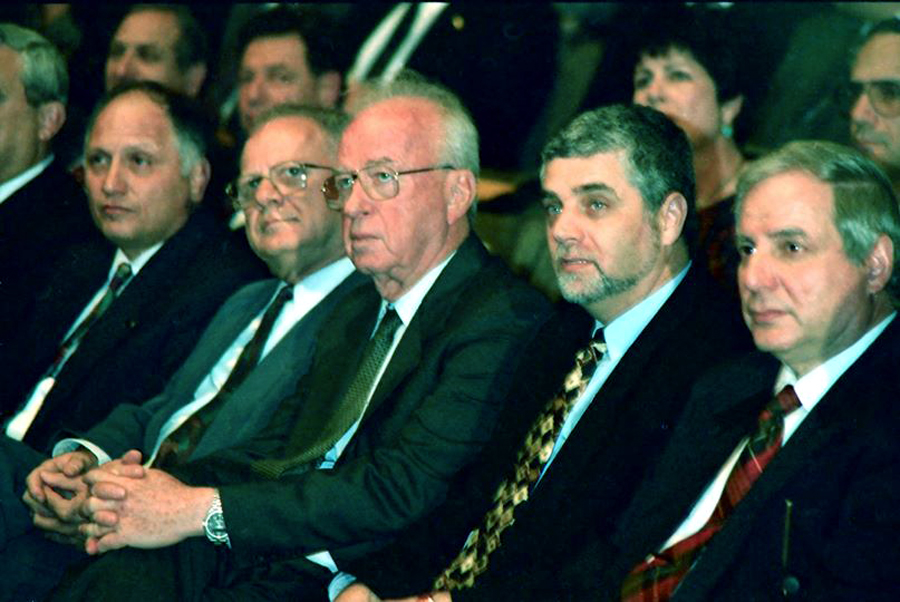
PMO, Simon sheves, with Prime Minister Yitzhak Rabin and Micha Harish, Minister of Industry and Commerce, National Award Ceremony quality in the industry.

In the second half of the 1980s, Sheves was asked to sit on the board of several governmental companies and national bodies, including Israel Land Administration, Israel Aerospace Industries and Israeli Military Industries. He also chaired the committee to advance and integrate the Arab, Bedouin and Druze minorities in the Israeli society.

Leading up to the 1992 election, Sheves was appointed to manage the campaign for the Labor Party, headed by Rabin. Labor won the most seats in the Knesset in these elections, and Rabin was appointed to form the Israeli government. Once Prime Minister he made Sheves Director General of the Prime Minister's Office.

On November 4, 1995, Rabin was assassinated at the end of a rally in support of the Oslo Accords, dubbed "Yes to Peace, No to Violence". The assassin was Yigal Amir, a radical Jew who opposed the peace process.

Rabin's funeral was held on November 6, 1995. In attendance were representatives from 78 countries, including 23 kings and presidents and 22 prime ministers. Shimon Sheves was one of the eulogizers. Others were the then-United States President Bill Clinton, the then-Israeli President Ezer Weizman, the then-acting Prime Minister Shimon Peres, King Hussein of Jordan and others. After Rabin's murder Sheves decided to quit Israeli politics.

In the year of 2000 the district court has charged him and sentenced Sheves for two years in prison, one year of parole and 50,000NIS fine. Both him and the general attorney has appealed, and in 2003 the supreme court of Israel has cleared his sentence. The state had appealed again so the supreme court has charged him on 30 November 2004 for breach of trust as a government employee in two separated affairs.

== Business career ==
Shimon Sheves is the Chairman of RSLB, an American company whose offices are located in Washington, D.C. RSLB assists and advises Israeli businesspeople and business owners who are interested in getting into the American market, and works in cooperation with international and transnational bodies, such as The World Bank, EXIM and IADB.

Sheves is also active in private international businesses in Europe and the United States. Since 2002, Sheves has been serving as a political and economic advisor to governments as well as to leaders in Romania, Bulgaria, Hungary, Austria, Serbia and the United States. He also advises on economic issues and cyber security to large multinational corporations. On March 10, 2016, he was indicted in absentia by Romanian National Anticorruption Directorate, on charges regarding the unlawful recovery of Paul-Philippe Hohenzollern's inheritance.

Later this year, Israeli media quoted reports from Romania that stated Sheves will not be indicted, had not been questioned, and that the case against him would be closed.

== Public activity ==
Shimon Sheves has spoken several times about the Israeli–Palestinian conflict and the social protests in Israel, when addressing Israeli students and Jewish communities in Europe.

His public activity also includes helping Israeli voluntary associations involved in promoting democratic debate in Israel and helping the less fortunate.
