= Daphni Leef =

- דפני ליף
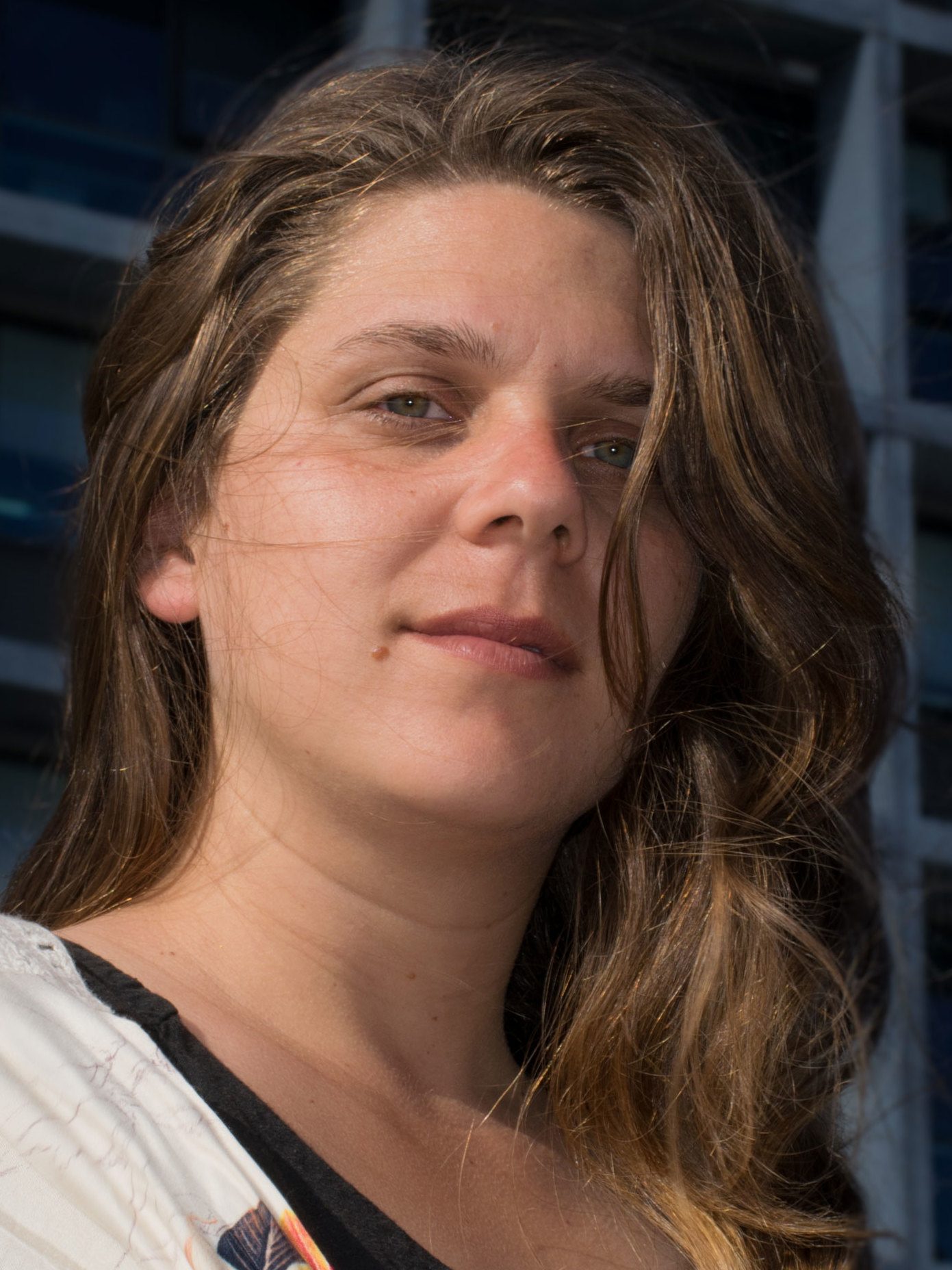
- Leef, 2015
- Born: January 7, 1986 (age 40); Jerusalem, Israel
- Education: Tel Aviv University
- Occupation: Video editor
- Known for: Her involvement in initiating and in the leadership of the 2011 housing protests in Israel

Daphni Leef (Hebrew: דפני ליף; born 7 January 1986) is an Israeli social activist, video artist, and editor. In July 2011 she initiated the 2011 Israeli Social Justice Protest that took place in Tel Aviv and were the largest social protests in Israel's history.

Following the civil protest Leef focused on issues regarding fair housing in Israel and established various independent social projects.

In 2017 Leef debuted the first movie she directed named Before My Feet Touch the Ground, which is a documentary about the 2011 protest from her personal perceptive. The film was chosen to open the Docaviv - Tel Aviv International Documentary Film Festival in May 2017, and was part of the official selection of the 2017 International Documentary Film Festival Amsterdam.

== Biography ==
Daphni Naomi Leef is the daughter of the Israeli composer Inam Leef, and the great-granddaughter of the Israeli engineer Zalman Leef. Leef was born in Jerusalem and raised in the Rehavia neighborhood of the city. She attended Gymnasia Rehavia junior high. In 2002, at age 16, she moved with her family to Kfar Shmaryahu, a local council within the Tel Aviv District ranked very highly on the Israeli socio-economic scale. During her high school period Leef majored in Film Studies at a high school in Ramat Hasharon.

In September 2002 Leef signed a public letter along with dozens of other pre-army-aged youths that declared their refusal to serve in the "army of occupation". Leef did not serve in the IDF, but claimed in an August 2011 interview that she did not serve in the military for medical reasons.

In 2005, after she finished high school, Leef moved to Tel Aviv and began studying in the film department of Tel Aviv University. Leef graduated from the university in 2008. She became a professional video editor and has created many short films, music videos for Israeli singers (such as Eran Tzur, Michal Amdursky and Noam Nevo) and films for various political NGOs, including a short work for the "Free Israel" association ("ישראל חופשית"), which promotes civil marriage in Israel.

=== 2011 protests ===
During June 2011 Leef received a notice to vacate the apartment that she had rented in Tel Aviv for the previous three years. After several weeks of searching to no avail for a new apartment within reach of her film-editing job, Leef discovered that the rental prices in the entire Tel Aviv metropolitan area had doubled in the previous five years.

As an act of protest Leef decided to open a Facebook page and ask people to help her in organizing a protest. Ten people, among them Stav Shaffir (later to become MK in Israeli Parliament), Regev Contes (filmmaker) and other activists, replied and attended a preparation meeting, in which they decided to pitch tents in Tel Aviv, claiming young people in Israel have no way to pay their rent. Two weeks later, on 14 July, they pitched five tents at the Rothschild Boulevard in Tel-Aviv, while police warned them against camping in the public sphere without permission. Soon afterward the protests gained momentum as thousands joined the protests, pitching tents in the central streets of cities across Israel. sparking off the 2011 Israel housing protests. On 29 August 2011, in the context of aspersions about Leef's background and intentions, Leef abruptly ended an interview when asked about not doing mandatory military service or Sherut Leumi, her affluent upbringing, what the Trajtenberg Committee was dealing with, and a question about her lack of presence or if she has even slept in the Tel Aviv tent area. She revealed that she received an exemption from the army for having epilepsy but had volunteered in a children's shelter, and that she had not slept in the Rothschild Boulevard tents the preceding week.

=== 2012 protests ===
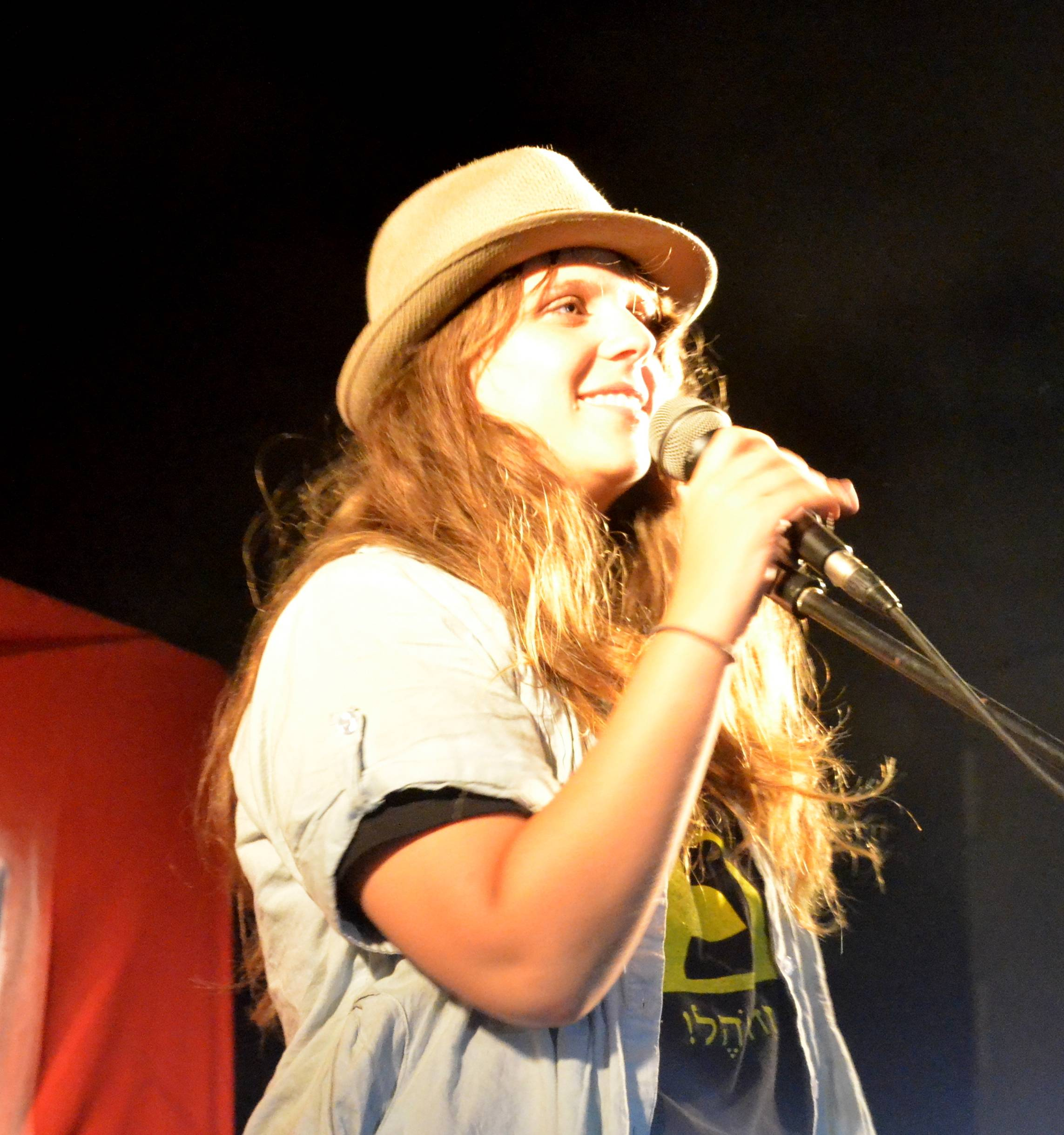
Daphni Leef at a rally in 2011

At 22 June 2012, Leef and several other activists tried to restart the housing protests by re-erecting a tent encampment in the Rothschild Boulevard in Tel-Aviv. The municipality had not issued a permit and as a result Leef, along with eleven other activists, were arrested when they resisted the 20 policemen and municipal inspectors who arrived to dismantle the tents. The protesters' tents were confiscated by the police forces as well.

=== "Before My Feet Touch the Ground", 2017 Movie ===
Leef's debut film as a director came out in 2017 in the opening of the Docaviv - Tel Aviv International Documentary Film Festival. The documentary movie uses news clips and Leef's own video footage, as she looks back on the turbulent period in 2011 when she was transformed from a somewhat naive young woman into a celebrated and controversial national icon. The movie was produced by Yael Abecassis and Hillel Roseman, and was edited by Tal Shefi.

== Controversy ==
As the housing protests continued, personal criticism of Leef and her political views mounted. Opponents charged that Israeli left-wing media and political organizations were exploiting the demonstrations and economic distress of the Israeli public for political purposes, with the intention of overthrowing the right-wing Netanyahu government.

On 15 July 2011, demonstrators drove Likud Knesset member Miri Regev out of the tent encampment. Regev responded by saying that Leef "represents the extreme left." Leef denied this, claiming her protest was first and foremost a social struggle. On 20 July 2011, Im Tirtzu announced it would no longer take part in the housing protests because the New Israel Fund and anti-Zionist left-wing groups were being directly involved. Im Tirtzu said, "Daphni Leef, who is perceived in the media as the initiator of the struggle, is actually a video editor for the New Israel Fund and Shatil."

At a press conference held on 26 July 2011 Leef responded: "What hasn't been said about me in the recent days? When we came here with our tents about ten days ago, some said we are spoiled children from Tel Aviv, some said we are leftists, but after more cities from across the country and as more people from across the entire political spectrum in Israel joined the protests — all understood that we represent all the people."

In an interview with the Israeli radio network Galei Tzahal on 3 August 2011, Leef referred to the "tent representation" group, which seeks to democratically replace the leadership of the housing protest: "It hurts me, things have been said about my character, I hope it would be resolved."

On 3 November 2011, Yedioth Ahronoth reported that Leef and partner Stav Shaffir decided to officially establish a fund so that they could fundraise money to pay for the continuing efforts.

== In popular culture ==
- In October 2011 the Israel Philharmonic Orchestra premiered Matti Kovler's "Fanfare to Israel," inspired by Daphni Leef, and quoting from Eviatar Banai's song "Yesh Li Sikui." The performance took place at the closing Gala concert of the Israeli Music Celebration at the Henry Crown Symphony Hall, Jerusalem Theater, with Leef's father, composer Yinam Leef in the audience.
- In 2011 the Israeli poet Apollo Braun recorded the song "Inspired By Daphni Leef". The song appears in his spoken word CD "The Obsessive Poet".
- In May 2012 the Israeli rock band The Giraffes released the song "Daphni Daphni" (דפני דפני), "as a homage to the person who ignited the protests".
