= Savion Einstein =

Israeli screenwriter

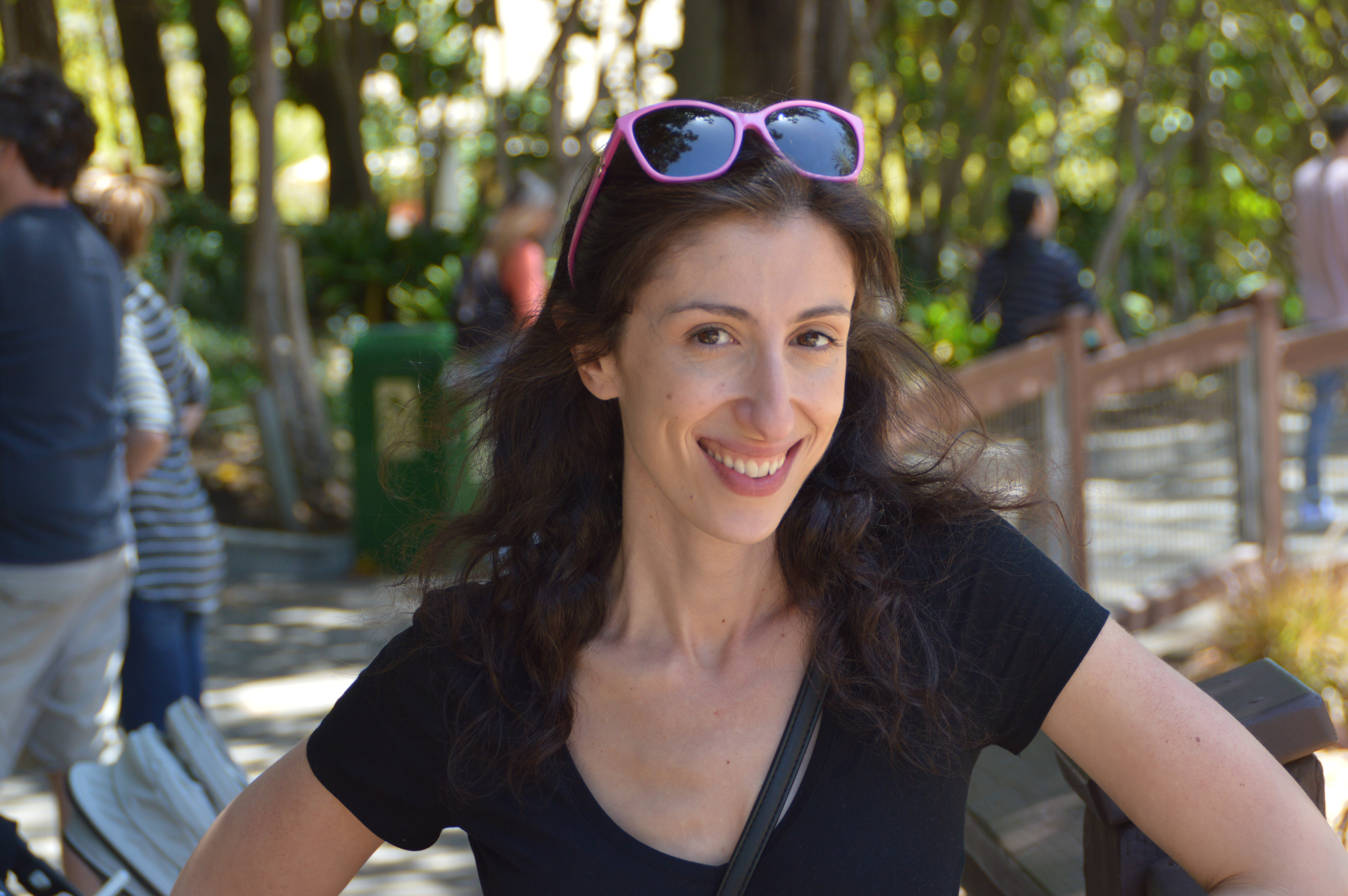
Savion Einstein

Savion Einstein (Hebrew: סביון איינשטיין) is an Israeli screenwriter and producer. The daughter of the late sports broadcaster Meir Einstein, she has written numerous advertisements and screenplays. Her work has been recognised with several honours, including a Joplin Award and a nomination for the Nicholl Fellowships in Screenwriting. In 2018, her screenplay Superfecundation was sold to Sony's production company Screen Gems.

== Biography ==
The advertisements Einstein produced, among them, Fox Fashion's Forever Young with Bar Refaeli and Noam Tor, Of Tov’s (Good Chicken) with Dror Keren, and First International Bank's Popcorn with Assi Cohen, won the Golden Cactus and Effie Awards. From 2012 to 2013, Einstein served as a film critic on the website "Seret" ("Film"), where she reviewed films such as "At Any Price", "Blue Jasmine", "Take This Waltz", and "Killing Them Softly", to name a few.

In 2007, Einstein interned as a script reader at the production company of Academy Award winning screenwriter and producer Steve Zaillian. In 2014, Einstein relocated to Los Angeles. That same year, a screenplay Einstein wrote won the Joplin Award in the BlueCat Screenplay Competition and she was selected from thousands of screenwriters to participate in "The Black List" feature writing lab where she was mentored by screenwriters Max Borenstein and Jessica Bendinger. In 2017, she was included in Tracking Board’s “Young & Hungry” list, highlighting Hollywood’s most promising screenwriters.

In 2016, “Superfecundation”, a screenplay for a romantic comedy written by Einstein reached the semi-finals at the Academy Awards’ Nicholl Fellowships in Screenwriting and won second place at the CineStory Feature Screenplay Competition. In 2018, the script was sold to Sony’s Screen Gems and is being produced by Brownstone, Elizabeth Banks and Max Handelman’s production company

== Screenplays ==
- 2014 - The Longest Birthday (feature)
- 2016 - Superfecundation (feature)
- 2019 - Marriage Material (series, co-wrote with Oran Zegman)
- 2020 - Staying Home (feature)

== Awards ==
=== Advertising ===
Year	Description
2006	“Bowling”, Coca-Cola Company campaign for Sprite (Geller Nesis) – won the Gold Cactus award in the Beverage category
2006	"Pastrami", campaign for Of Tov with Dror Keren (Geller Nesis) - won the Silver Cactus award in the Food category
2009	“Popcorn”, campaign for the First International Bank with Assi Cohen (Glikman Shamir Samsonov) - won the Bronze Cactus award in the Finance category
2010	"Cannes", campaign for YES Satellite Services (McCann Erickson) - won the Bronze Cactus award in the Communications/Media category
2011	"Forever Young", campaign for Fox Fashion with Bar Refaeli and Noam Tur (Zarmon Goldman) - won the Bronze Cactus award in the Fashion category
2011	"Wedding" and "Italian Series", Gad Dairy TV campaign (Reuveni Pridan) - won the Effie Platinum award

=== Screenwriting ===
Year	Description
2014	The Joplin Award, BlueCat Screenplay Competition for "The Longest Birthday" screenplay
2014	Einstein was selected for "The Black List" Feature Writing Lab in Las Vegas with the screenplay "The Longest Birthday"
2016	Second place, CineStory Feature Screenplay Competition for “Superfecundation” screenplay
2016	Semi-finalist at the Academy Awards’ Nicholl Fellowship with "Superfecundation" screenplay
