= Housing in Israel =

Housing in Israel refers to the history of housing in Israel.

== History ==
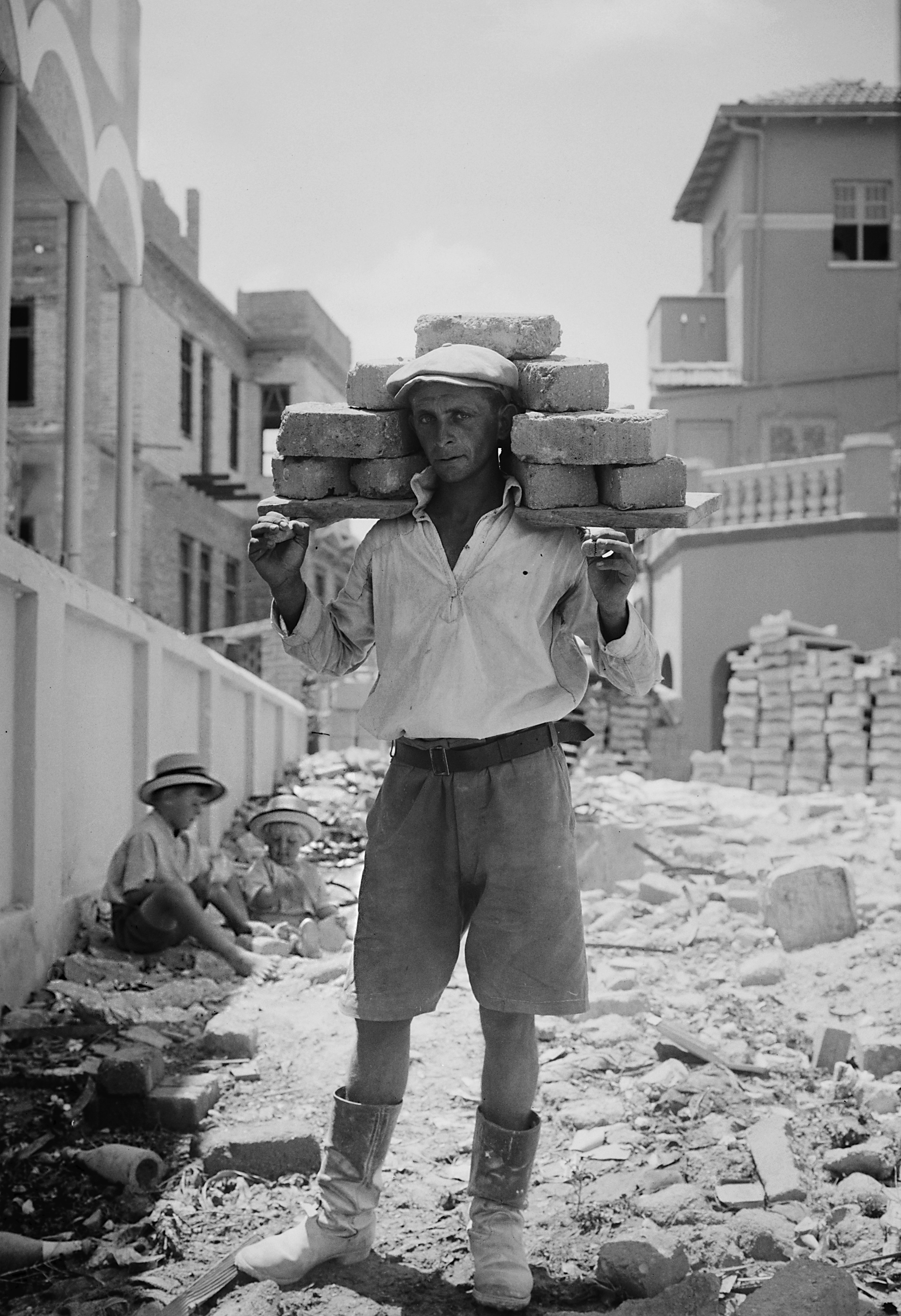
A worker building homes in Tel Aviv, 1920-1930

After the establishment of the State of Israel on May 14, 1948, hundreds of thousands of Jews from all over the world began immigrating to the new state, between 650,000 and 850,000 of whom were expelled from Arab countries and Iran. Many were housed in temporary camps known as ma'abarot, where they lived in huts, tents, and packing crates until permanent housing could be built. In September 1948, the Ministry of Labor established a National Housing Department to supervise development on a nationwide scale. The Amidar housing company was founded that year and plans were drawn up for the construction of 16,000 housing units in and around the country's urban centers. The Absorption Department of the Jewish Agency imported 6,000 cabins from Sweden for temporary accommodation.

In cities and development towns all over the country, rows of concrete tenements began to be hastily erected to address the severe housing shortage. These government-funded low-cost housing projects were known as shikunim.

Beginning in the 1990s, waves of immigrants from the collapsing Soviet Union began to arrive in Israel, amounting to over one million olim. In the late 2000s and 2010, the real-estate prices in Israel appeared to be inflated compared to the long-term average, other developed economies, rents and average income. This real estate bubble was blamed on the country-wide housing shortage. However, many economists and investors do not see it as a bubble.

During the 2008 financial crisis, Israel's central bank governor, Stanley Fischer, lowered interest rates to an all-time low of 0.5%. That resulted in prices rising very fast in 2009, after rising steadily in the preceding decade.

Most mortgages taken out in 2007–2009 were adjustable-rate mortgages pegged to the prime rate, which at the low was 1.75%.

== Home ownership ==
In 2012, 67.9% of Israelis lived in homes that they owned and 26.9% in rented homes.

== See also ==
- Architecture of Israel
- Economy of Israel
- Immigrant camps (Israel)
- Israeli settlement
