= Timeline of the 2011 Israeli social justice protests =

The following is a chronological summary of the major events that have been taking place during the 2011 Israeli social justice protests.

== July ==
=== 14–22 July 2011 ===
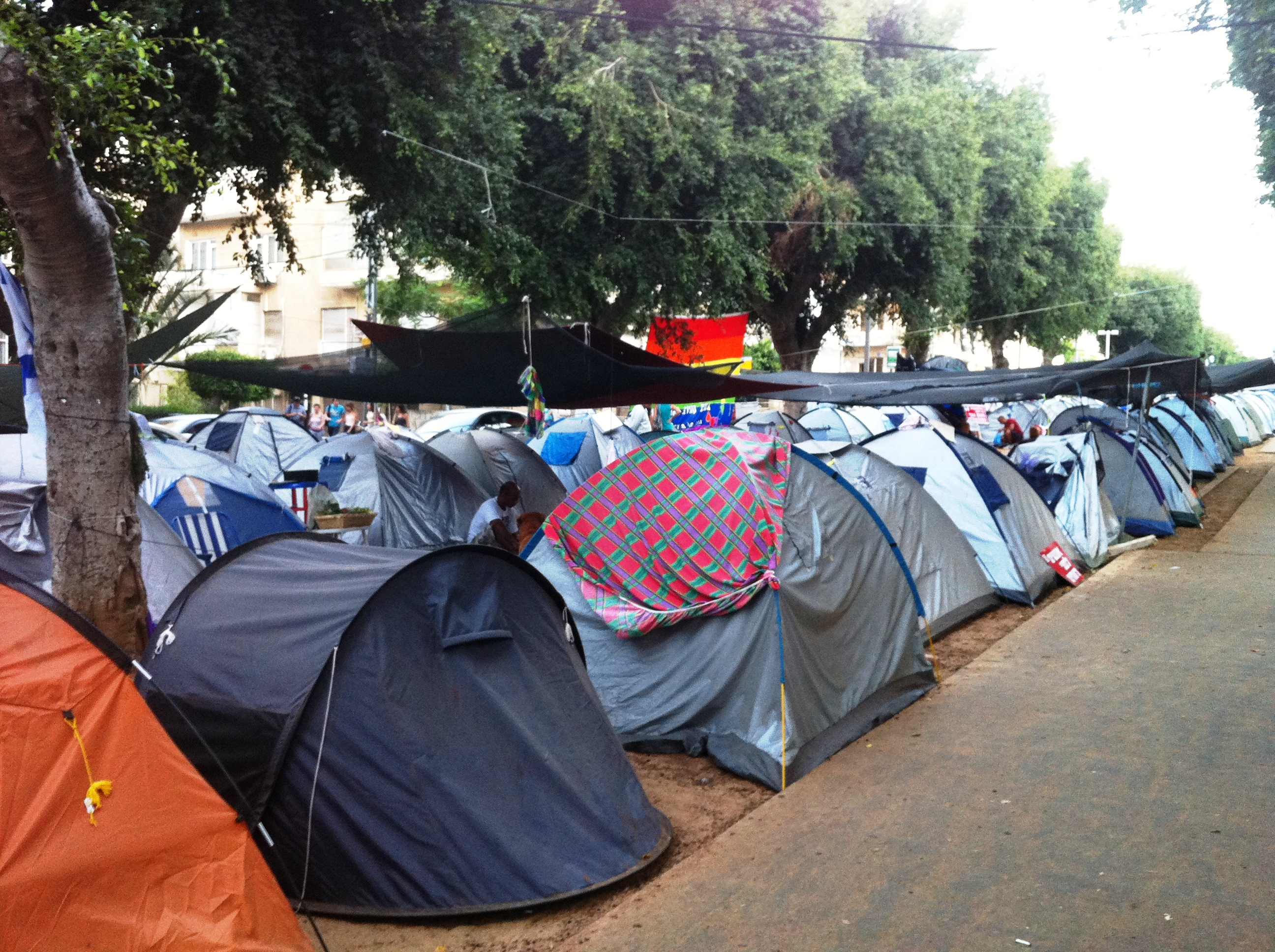
The protest compound on Rothschild Boulevard in Tel Aviv, July 21, 2011

During the first two days of protests (14–15 July 2011), about 50 tents were pitched on Rothschild Boulevard in central Tel Aviv. The encampment quickly grew as more protesters arrived and additional tents were pitched. By 6 August, the Rothschild Boulevard tent camp had grown to about 400 tents and hundreds of people. Among the groups participating in the protest were a Facebook group called the "Tel Aviv group" and a group from Holon called "The Youth Movement". One of the protesters opened an installation by taking the furniture from his apartment and setting up a living room at the Rothschild Boulevard protest. Tent camps were also set up in other areas of Tel Aviv. The camps were established on land allotted to protesters by the Tel Aviv municipality.

About 20 tents were also pitched in central Jerusalem. On 16 July 2011, the National Union of Israeli Students joined the protests, stating that more demonstration centers would open across Israel staffed by students from Ruppin College, Beit Berl College, Tel-Hai College, as well as Beersheba and Kiryat Shmona.

On 17 July 2011, the Hashomer Hatzair movement joined the protests. MKs Ilan Gilon of Meretz and Nino Abesadze of Kadima joined the protests for one night. In addition, many Israeli artists joined the public protests.

On 19 July 2011, local students set up tents outside the walls of the Old City of Jerusalem, across from the Mamilla Mall. The students requested permission from the Jerusalem Municipality to establish a tent city, but were denied by city officials, because they feared it could harm tourism. However, city officials announced their support of the protesters' cause.

On 20 July 2011, protests reached the Orthodox city of El'ad, where a few dozen protesters gathered at the entrance to the city to protest against high rent rates. In Ashdod, demonstrators pitched six tents, while members of the "Ashdod is Awakening" movement urged the mayor to promote an affordable housing program. In Kiryat Shmona, dozens of youths blocked junctions in the city. Charlie Biton, a former leader of the Israeli Black Panthers movement, joined the protest encampment in Jerusalem to express his support.

On 21 July 2011, a group of students protested in central Tel Aviv, blocking the intersection near the Defense Ministry headquarters, and conducting a sit-in at a building under construction on Dizengoff Street. Demonstrators climbed to the top of the building and hung signs demanding affordable housing.

=== 23 July 2011 (Tel Aviv protest rally) ===
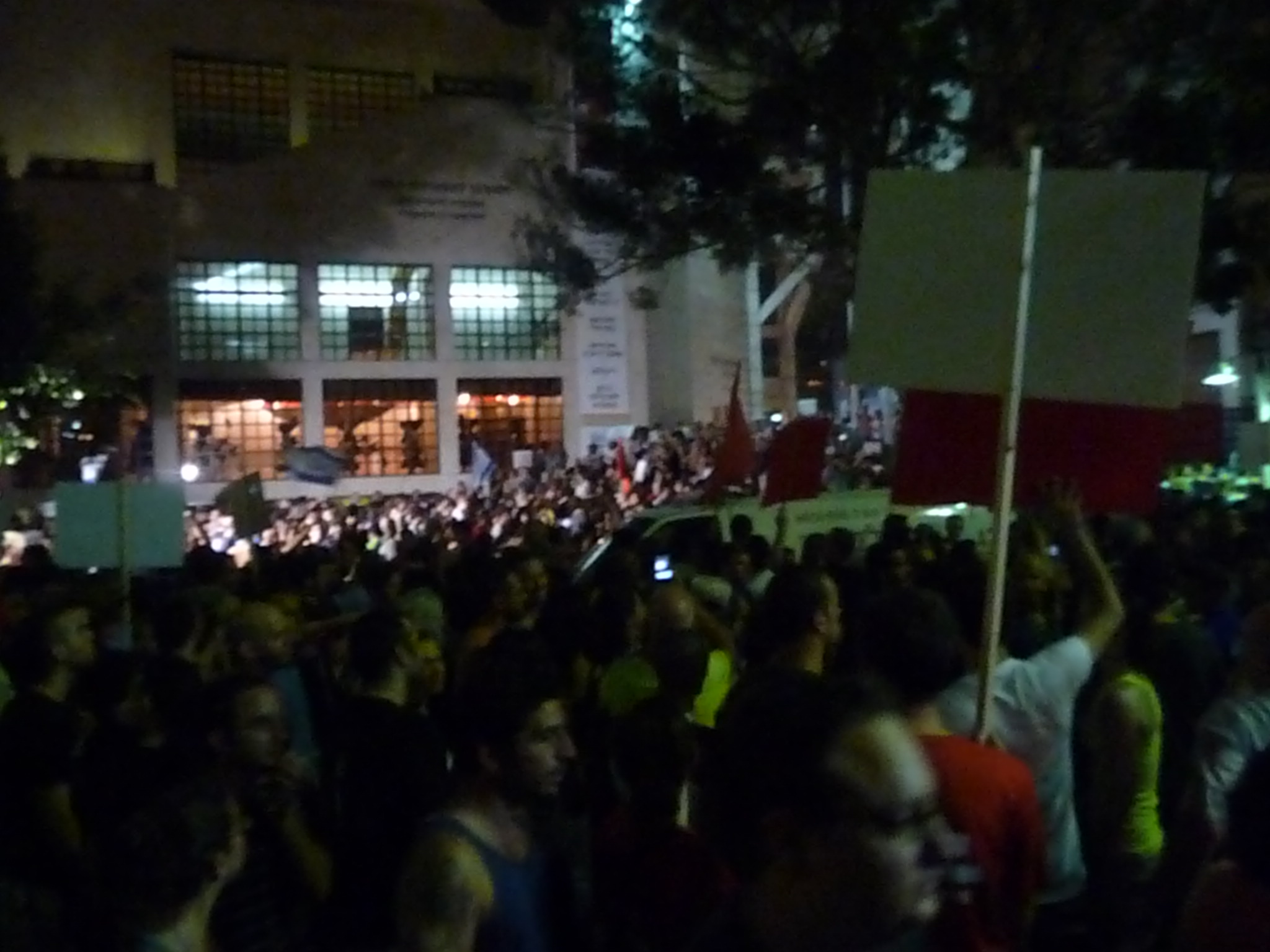
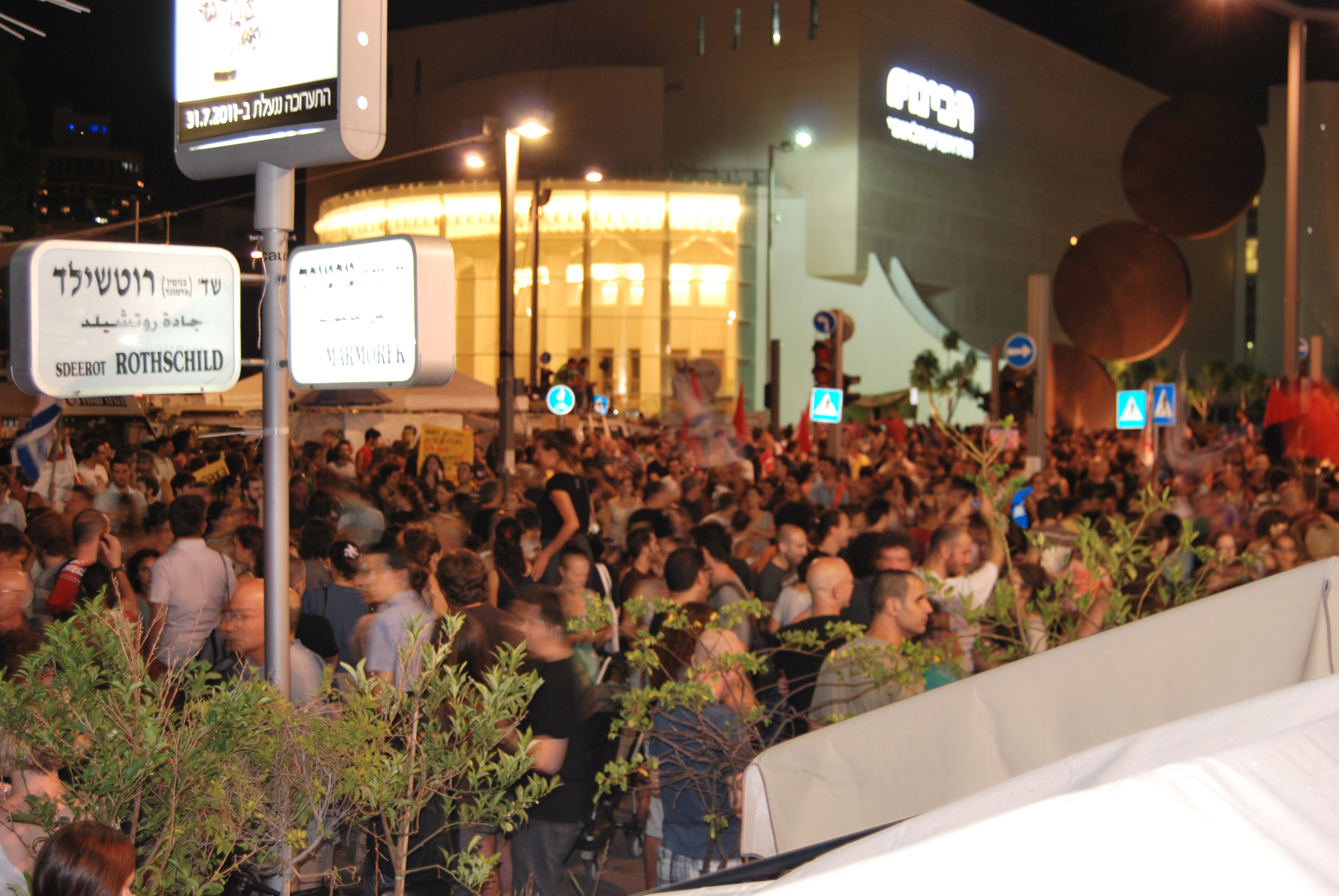
Tel Aviv protest rally, July 23, 2011

On the evening of the July 23, 2011, tens of thousands of demonstrators participated in a protest rally held in the center of Tel Aviv and initiated by the housing protest organizers. A demonstration was held, followed by a mass march from the tent compound at Habima Square to the Tel Aviv Museum of Art Plaza, where the main rally was held. Following the rally, protesters blocked the intersection of Ibn Gabirol and Dizengoff streets. A police official estimated that over 20,000 people participated in the protests. A clash broke out after police detained one participant, prompting a crowd of demonstrators to block the intersection of Kaplan and Ibn Gabirol Streets. Demonstrators camped in the middle of the intersection and barricaded it with barriers from nearby repair works. The crowd chanted slogans in favor of the police, and explained to police that they, too, could not afford decent housing with their salaries, and encouraged policemen to demand the right to unionize, which Israeli police officers are banned by law from doing. Police cleared the junction using selective arrests. The police effort involved mounted police and officers on motorcycles. The protesters initially threw beer cans, but quickly resorted to chanting pro-police and pro social justice slogans, and calling for revolution and non-violence. The demonstrators then attempted to march up Dizengoff Street to the nearest police station in solidarity with the detained, but were blocked and thinned out by police, who used limited force and selective arrests. The demonstration broke up, and the protesters returned to the tent camp. A total of 43 demonstrators were arrested and about 200 were detained.

The 43 arrested demonstrators subsequently appeared before the Tel Aviv Magistrates' Court, of which 32 were released after they were questioned and signed documents prohibiting them from entering a large area surrounding Rothschild Boulevard or taking part in the protests for 30 days. The remaining 11, all members of Anarchists Against the Wall, were released after signing papers banning them from entering central Tel Aviv and from attending the tent protests for 7 days. One of them was also charged with throwing a smoke grenade at police, and another was charged with assault.

=== 24–29 July 2011 ===
On 24 July 2011, a protest broke out in Jerusalem, with over 1,000 demonstrators marching towards the Knesset, or Israeli parliament. The demonstration caused major traffic disruptions, and passed by Beit Aghion, the official residence of the Prime Minister, with local residents being urged to join in. One demonstrator was arrested after attempting to enter the Knesset compound. The same day, Prime Minister Binyamin Netanyahu declared that he will meet with protest organizers that week, in order to find "housing solutions for young couples and IDF veterans."

On 25 July 2011, demonstrators blocked roads in Jerusalem, Tel Aviv, Haifa, and Rosh HaAyin, while demonstrations were held in Beersheba and Rishon LeZion. Protest leaders said that police authorized the blocking of roads for twenty minutes in the afternoon, a claim denied by police. In some instances, protesters left roads on their own initiative, while others were cleared by police. In Haifa, ten demonstrators were cleared by police in the Merkaz HaCarmel area, and patrol cars were stationed in the vicinity. In Tel Aviv, the encampment on Rothschild Boulevard was largely deserted, with protesters either escaping the midday heat or leaving for Jerusalem to join the protests there. Two large demonstrations took place in Jerusalem's Paris Square, across from Beit Aghion, the Prime Minister's residence. Protesters laid down on a road near Paris Square to block it, and were dispersed by police, who arrested eight demonstrators for disturbing the peace. Demonstrators attempted to build a brick wall across the entrance road to the Knesset building. The wall was about three rows high when police demolished it. A female demonstrator was later arrested after arriving with more bricks and emptying them across a road. Five demonstrators were arrested for blocking traffic in the city. Police dispersed protesters blocking traffic, arresting five, while one police officer was injured. The protesters later moved to Horse Park on King George Street to set up a tent camp. A group of ultra-Orthodox demonstrators from the "Israel is Right" coalition continued demonstrating outside the Knesset after the students left. Later, 100 protesters from the National Union of Israeli Students knocked on the doors of the offices of Knesset members to explain to them why they should oppose the government's bill to expedite building plans, calling for a significant number of the homes the bill would provide to be small and affordable. Another dozen students met with Knesset Speaker Reuven Rivlin.

On 26 July 2011, Prime Minister Binyamin Netanyahu announced new housing programs aimed at addressing the housing shortage in Israel and at supporting the students. The protest movement dismissed the plan for not meeting their demands, and stated that the protests would continue. One demonstrator told Ynetnews that the protests demanded a comprehensive solution for persons such as students, renters, and young couples, while a member of the Educators' Kibbutzim of the Dror Israel Movement told Ynet that "we don't need privatization- what we need is development funds and (government) investment in the periphery". The National Union of Israeli Students released a statement welcoming the plan, but announcing that they would continue to protest. During the press conference where Prime Minister Netanyahu announced the new plan, some fifty activists protested outside the Prime Minister's office, chanting "Bibi, we're not buying your spin". In Parliament, members of the Labor and Kadima parties criticized the plan. Opposition chairwoman Tzipi Livni of Kadima stated that Netanyahu was "taking down tents, not building homes", and that "he doesn't understand that the problem isn't technical, but fundamental. The middle class needs to be unburdened, and for that the national policy must be changed. Marginal solutions are not enough". Later, some 700 protesters gathered in Haifa's Park Haim for a rally. Following the rally, some demonstrators attempted to block a nearby street, and police arrested seven. A similar rally was held in the Hatikva Quarter of Tel Aviv, and HaEtzel Street was partially blocked. In Ashdod, hundreds of residents demonstrated in the streets.

On 27 July, students in Tel Aviv marched from the encampment at Rothschild Boulevard towards the city's government buildings, wearing red shirts and beating on garbage bins with sticks. In Jerusalem, some 150 protesters, mainly university students and social activists, marched to one of Prime Minister Netanyahu's private apartments, and announced that they would "put it up for sale", as it was not in use. Along the route, the protesters disrupted traffic on several occasions and for a few minutes blocked the road leading to the Prime Minister's official residence, and police set up roadblocks in the area to prevent activists from approaching the site. Later, demonstrators passed an apartment building which they claimed was empty due to the owners residing overseas. During their walk, the marchers were accompanied by police. Arab citizens of Israel joined the protests, with residents of the Arab city of Baqa al-Gharbiyye setting up a tent encampment and hanging protest signs on tents. Members of the city's Public Committee and a local youth movement participated, as did Arab Knesset members Jamal Zahalka and Mohammed Barakeh. Meanwhile, authorities began to take action to dismantle the tent encampments. In Beersheba, police dispersed protesters that had pitched tents before the city's municipality building. In Netanya, organizers of a protest there claimed that authorities were trying to evict them from their protest spot in front of luxury towers in an upscale neighborhood, with inspectors handing out tickets to their supporters in vehicles. In Tel Aviv, municipality inspectors arrived at a 15-tent encampment in Levinsky Park to hand out eviction orders, which claimed that pitching a tent in a public park without a permit was illegal.

On 28 July, thousands of Israeli parents took part in a "strollers march" across Israel, protesting what they termed the high cost of raising a child in Israel. In particular, demonstrators were protesting against the exaggerated fees charged by daycare centers and nursery schools, as well as the overall high prices of basic products for babies and children. Parents showed up with strollers, tying a yellow balloon to them, with many bringing their children. The main protest rally took place in Tel Aviv, where over 4,000 people participated. Some 600 others marched in Ra'anana, 300 in Haifa, with protests also taking place in Yehud, Ness Ziona, Kfar Saba, Ashdod, and Rishon LeZion. In Jerusalem, housing demonstrators joined the annual gay pride parade. Thousands of people marched in the parade, which began in Independence Park and headed towards the Knesset compound. Police secured the demonstration, and arrested a Hasidic man trying to throw stink bombs at the protest. Some 20 ultra-Orthodox and right-wing activists at the International Convention Center protested against the march.

On 28 July, hundreds of people in Tel Aviv demonstrated against the high cost of living, blocking a road on the corner of King Saul and Ibn Gabirol streets, waving Israeli flags and protest signs, many of them reading "land of milk and taxes".

On 29 July, some twenty Tel Aviv University students marched from Rothschild Boulevard to the luxury Tzameret Towers in northern Tel Aviv, and demonstrated outside the luxury towers, throwing stink bombs and releasing balloons.

=== The July 30th protest rallies ===
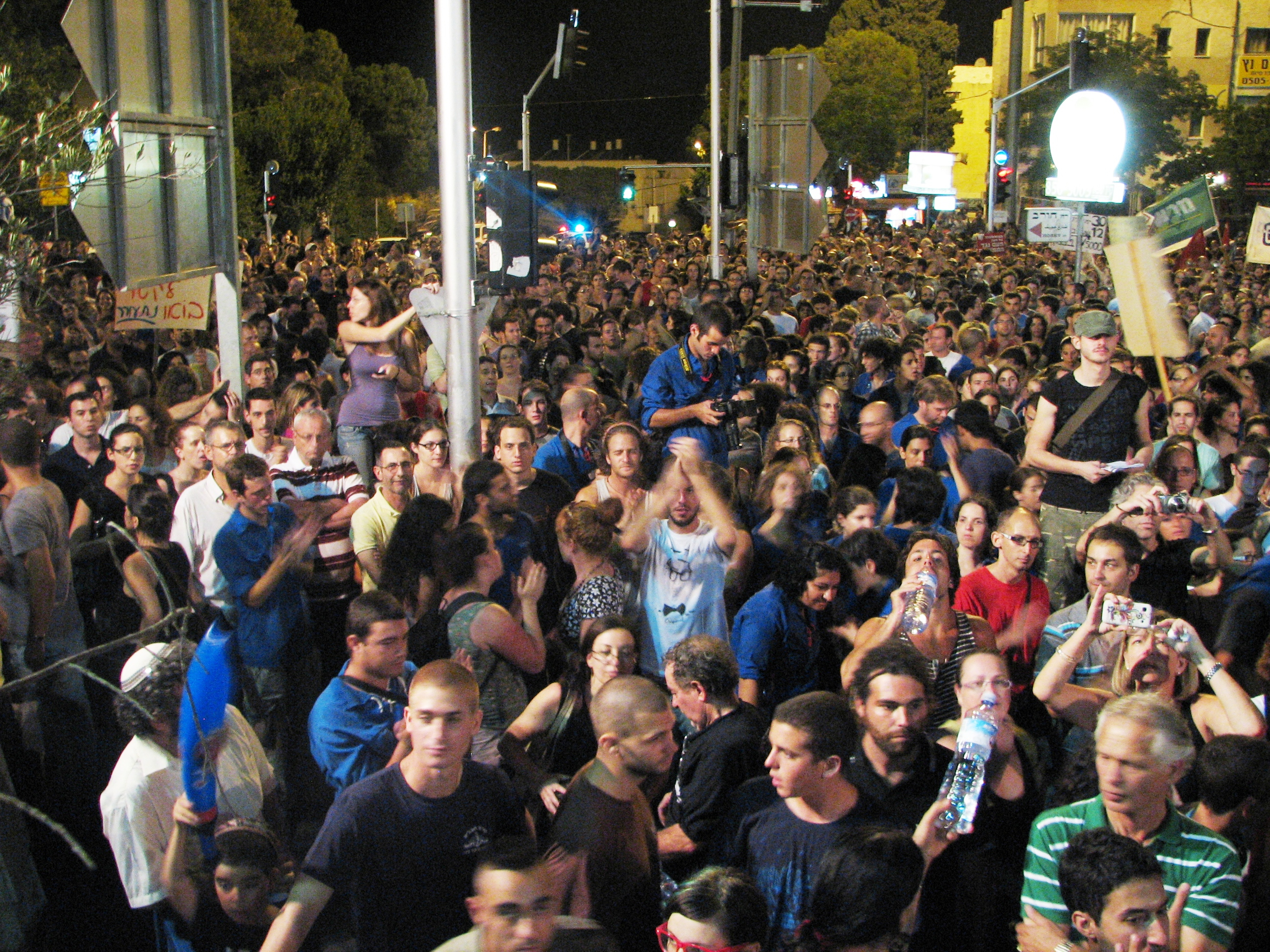
Haifa protest rally, July 30, 2011

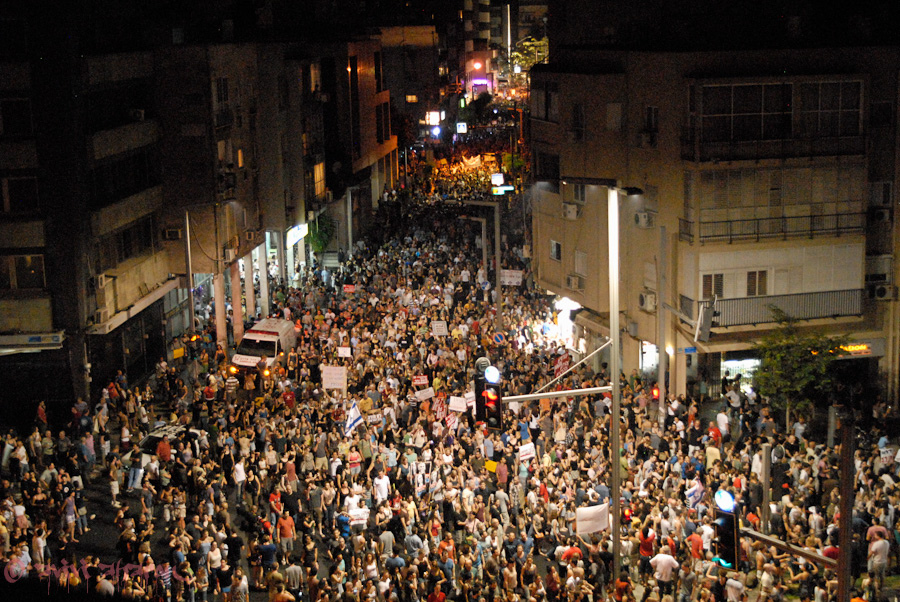
Tel Aviv protest rally, July 30, 2011

On 30 July, between 85,000 (police estimation) and 150,000 people (organizers estimation) took part in demonstrations in the streets against the social policies of the Netanyahu government, chanting slogans denouncing the government and calling for social justice. Demonstrations were held in Jerusalem, Tel Aviv, Haifa, Beersheba, Kfar Saba, Ra'anana, Baqa al-Gharbiya, Ashdod, Nazareth, Kiryat Shmona, Modi'in-Maccabim-Re'ut, Kfar Saba, Netanya, Ashkelon, Tiberias, the Savion Junction, and the Jordan Valley. Police sources said that in all, about 150,000 people took part in the protests. In Tel Aviv alone, about 80,000 participated in the demonstration, which was so large that hundreds of police officers, including the sector commander, were deployed to secure it. Some 10,000 demonstrators participated in Jerusalem and 12,000 in Haifa.

=== 31 July ===
On 31 July in Tel Aviv, hundreds of people continued to protest after the official rally ended, blocking the city's Kaplan and Ibn Gabirol Streets. The protest was secured by police officers, including mounted police. After the protest had gone on for hours, police declared the gathering illegal and forcibly dispersed it after failing to negotiate a peaceful end. Central Control Unit officers formed a human chain to push demonstrators back and break up clusters of people blocking the roads. The protesters responded with verbal abuse, and several rioted. Twelve people were detained by police for questioning. In Jerusalem, hundreds of parents staged another "strollers march", marching from the Prime Minister's Office to Horse Park. A similar march was also held in Pardes Hanna-Karkur.

== August ==
=== 1 August – 5 August ===
On 1 August, more than 100 teachers and students protested for better education in Jerusalem and Tel Aviv. During the Tel Aviv protest, demonstrators carried a casket symbolizing the state of education in Israel.

On 2 August, hundreds of people from the Jerusalem tent city and other places demonstrated in the Wohl Rose Garden in front of the Knesset in response to Netanyahu's new housing law, which the demonstrators deemed inadequate. In south Tel Aviv, hundreds of people marched towards Levinsky Park in a protest calling for social justice, and a demonstration also took place in Haifa.

On 3 August, hundreds of Israeli right-wing activists led by Baruch Marzel visited the tent city on Rothschild Boulevard. Their demonstration, organized by a coalition of right-wing groups, was guarded by riot police. In Tel Aviv's Habima Square, some 5,000 dairy farmers marched towards the Tel Aviv Museum to hold a demonstration at the museum concourse, protesting a government plan to lower dairy prices. In Jerusalem, dozens of Russian immigrants and around 150 members of the Dror Israel movement protested.

On 4 August, a tent set up by right-wing activists on Rothschild Boulevard was torched by two protesters following a dispute at the protest site, with police claiming that one had attempted to deface signs and threatening the rightists with violence. Police arrested the two protesters after a video of them shot by a rightist was given to them. Eyewitnesses claimed that they were members of the far-left Anarchists Against the Wall group, and a right-wing activist claimed that the two had arrived "drunk and violent". He also claimed that he and other rightists had been harassed by the two activists since they arrived, and that they had tried to hurt them but were chased away the previous night. In Modi'in-Maccabim-Re'ut, 22 residents set up a tent camp and protested in front of the home of Knesset member Yariv Levin, who voted in favor of the National Housing Committees Law, which was strongly opposed by protesters. More than 1,000 demonstrators held "strollers marches" in Tel Aviv, Kiryat Motzkin, Herzliya, and Sderot. In Tel Aviv, a protest took place outside the Histadrut headquarters, while about 1,500 university lecturers, students, teachers, and members of youth groups marched to the home of Education Minister Gideon Sa'ar, calling for free education.

=== August 6th protest rallies ===
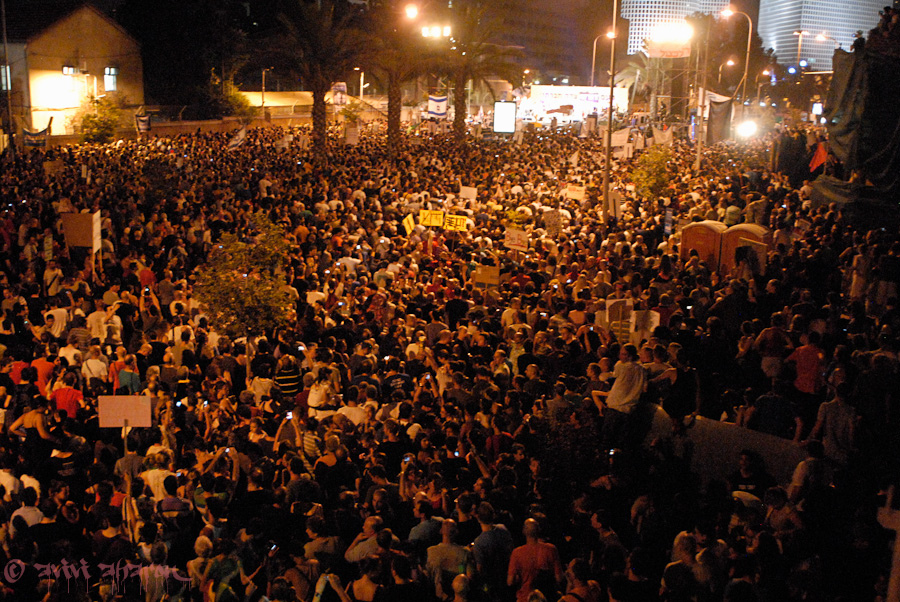
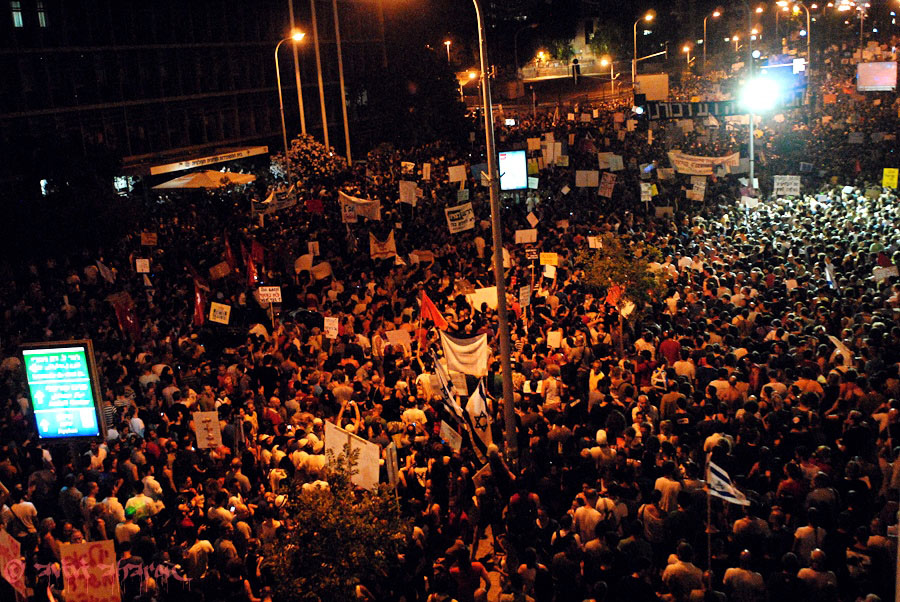
August 6 protest in Tel Aviv

On 6 August, between 200,000 (police estimation) and 350,000 protesters (or "over 300,000" as Haaretz reported) participated in demonstrations in cities throughout Israel. Demonstrations took place in Tel Aviv (150,000 - 300,000), Jerusalem (30,000), Kiryat Shmona (3,000), Hod HaSharon (1,000), Modi'in-Maccabim-Re'ut (5,000), Ashkelon (500), Dimona (200), and Eilat (1,000).

After the protesters in Tel Aviv had largely dispersed, several hundred remained, blocking the intersection of Kaplan and Ibn Gabirol Streets. Some forty minutes after most of the remaining protesters left the intersection, police declared the protest illegal and announced over loudspeakers that the demonstrators had ten minutes to clear the streets. The protesters responded with defiant slogans, and several dozen sat in the middle of the intersection. Roughly ten minutes later, riot police forces arrived on the scene, formed lines, and forcibly removed the remaining protesters and bystanders out of the intersection to a makeshift holding area. Five protesters were arrested. Police reopened the intersection to traffic at 1:15 am, and remained on-site to direct traffic.

=== 7 August – 9 August ===
On 7 August, some 1,300 parents staged "strollers marches" in Giv'atayim, Karmiel, and Pardes Hanna-Karkur. In Tel Aviv, some 100 right-wing activists marched in Rothschild Boulevard, protesting what they called the "anarchistic nature of the leftist housing protest".

On 8 August, hundreds of senior citizens protested in front of the government compound in Tel Aviv in a show of support for the protest, as well as setting a list of their own demands and calling for social justice. At the tent camp on Rothschild Boulevard, authorities towed a caravan parked by the National Union of Israeli Students hours after officials struck a demolition order on it.

On 9 August, some 200 protesters held a "torches march" in Jerusalem, holding burning torches and marching from Horse Park towards the Prime Minister's residence. The protest was held in response to a government decision to raise electricity rates by 10%. In Tel Aviv, the municipality attempted to remove vacant tents on Nordau Boulevard and Ben-Gurion Street. At the Ben-Gurion campsite, several municipal clerks entered the campsite and tried to impound a number of the tents. The clerks left after being asked if they had an eviction notice, but confiscated three tents and told protesters that they could pick them up at city hall later in the day. At the Nordau campsite, two municipal clerks and a contractor arrived to remove all empty tents, but left after seeing a television camera. The Rothschild Boulevard encampment was visited by Transportation Minister Yisrael Katz and Yesha Council chairman Dani Dayan.

=== Events of 10 August ===
On 10 August, a riot broke out in Holon. City inspectors ordered protesters, most of them homeless, to dismantle their tent camp in the low-income Jesse Cohen neighborhood within 24 hours. Some 100 residents responded by blocking one of the city's main roads, setting fire to furniture and tires, and chanting "the people demand public housing" and "we won't move until we get aid". Police and firefighting units were dispatched to the scene.

In Haifa, about 200 Israeli Arabs marched in the Wadi Nisnas neighborhood, chanting "the people want social justice" in Arabic. In Beersheba, protesters marched in swimsuits to exemplify how the social protest "has taken off". In Jerusalem, approximately 250 people marched to protest against the state of public transportation. In Tel Aviv, Haifa, and Kiryat Shmona, rallies were also held to protest unfair employment conditions, wearing white masks as a symbol of the "invisible" sector in whose name they said they were protesting. In Bat Yam, hundreds of residents marched in a protest against the high costs of living and housing shortages, and clashed with the police's Special Patrol Unit.

=== 11 August – 2 September ===
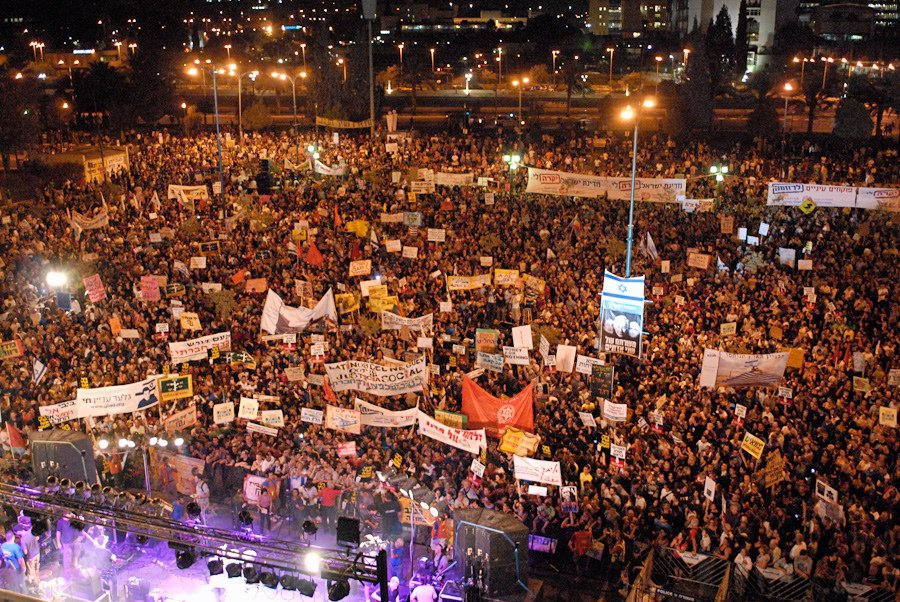
Beersheba protest rally, August 13, 2011

On August 11, hundreds of parents, doctors, lifeguards, and residents held demonstrations in Jerusalem, Eilat, Holon, Kiryat Motzkin, Haifa, Rehovot, Hadera, Bat Yam, Tel Aviv, Herzliya, and the West Bank settlement of Ariel. In Tel Aviv, taxi drivers blocked a main road to protest against the high price of diesel fuel, while rallies took place outside the headquarters of Histadrut and the home of Education Minister Gideon Sa'ar. At the Rothschild Boulevard tent camp, a guillotine, symbolizing the French Revolution, was placed in the center. The guillotine was later confiscated by municipal inspectors. Transportation Minister Yisrael Katz visited the Rothschild Boulevard tent camp to talk about transportation reform and other social issues. However, he was confronted by protesters charging that he was unaware of the personal hardships that lead to the protest. After an increasing crowd began gathering around him, Katz's bodyguards escorted him away from the site to his vehicle. Katz then invited some demonstrators to his office for a meeting.

On August 12, Tel Aviv municipal inspectors distributed an eviction notice to an activist who erected a structure to serve as a kitchen and storage facility at the Nordau Boulevard tent camp, forcing the activist to dismantle it.

On August 13, at most 75,000 people took part in mass rallies in sixteen cities and towns across Israel. Demonstrations took place in Haifa, Beersheba, Afula, Eilat, Rosh Pinna, Nahariya, Dimona, Petah Tikva, Modi'in-Maccabim-Re'ut, Beit She'an, Netanya, Ramat HaSharon, Hod HaSharon, Rishon LeZion, Beit Shemesh, and Ashkelon.

On August 16, dozens of Israelis rallied outside the Knesset compound in Jerusalem during an emergency special session on the protests. Demonstrators tried to break in through the back gate, violently clashing with Knesset Guard personnel.

On August 22 dozens of activists, accompanied by the protest leaders and the knesset members Nitzan Horowitz and Dov Hanin, invaded an abandoned public building in Tel Aviv. This act was done to protest against the inability of the Tel Aviv municipality which they claim did not renovate the old building to a residential building for young people. The following day all the activists at the site were evacuated by police.

On August 27, at most 13,000 people took part in mass rallies various cities and towns across Israel. The Tel Aviv protest was attended by approximately 8,000 people. Noam Shalit, the father of the captive soldier Gilad Shalit, gave a speech at the Tel Aviv rally in which he criticized Prime minister Netanyahu for his failure to release his son who has been held captive by Hamas for over five years in the Gaza Strip.

=== September 3rd: The "March of the Million" ===
On Saturday, September 3, an estimated 450,000 people participated in several demonstrations which were held over various locations across Israel and which were referred to by protest organizers as "The March of the Million". In the Tel Aviv march rally, which was held between the Rothschild Boulevard and the State Square, an estimated 300 thousand protesters participated though using proprietary technology to measure mobile phone signals, an Israeli start-up gave a reduced estimate of the crowd of a still impressive 150,000 people in Tel Aviv. Over 100 thousand people demonstrated throughout the rest of Israel in various demonstrations (40 thousand in Jerusalem, 30 thousand in Haifa, 15 thousand in Afula, 8,000 in Kiryat Motzkin, 3,000 in Nahariya, 2,500 in Hadera, 3000 in Karmiel and Rosh Pina, 5000 in Kiryat Shmona, 10 thousands in Kfar Yehoshua, 500 in Arad, 800 in Mitzpe Ramon and approximately 1,000 in Eilat).

The next day, Channel 10 reported about an internal memo describing the demands of the organizers including 45 billion NIS which would obligate the government to increase the budget. The organizers proposed to make up for the shortfall with increased taxes of the rich, inheritance tax, and using surplus tax money.
