= National Union of Israeli Students =

Student organization in Israel

- התאחדות הסטודנטים והסטודנטיות בישראל
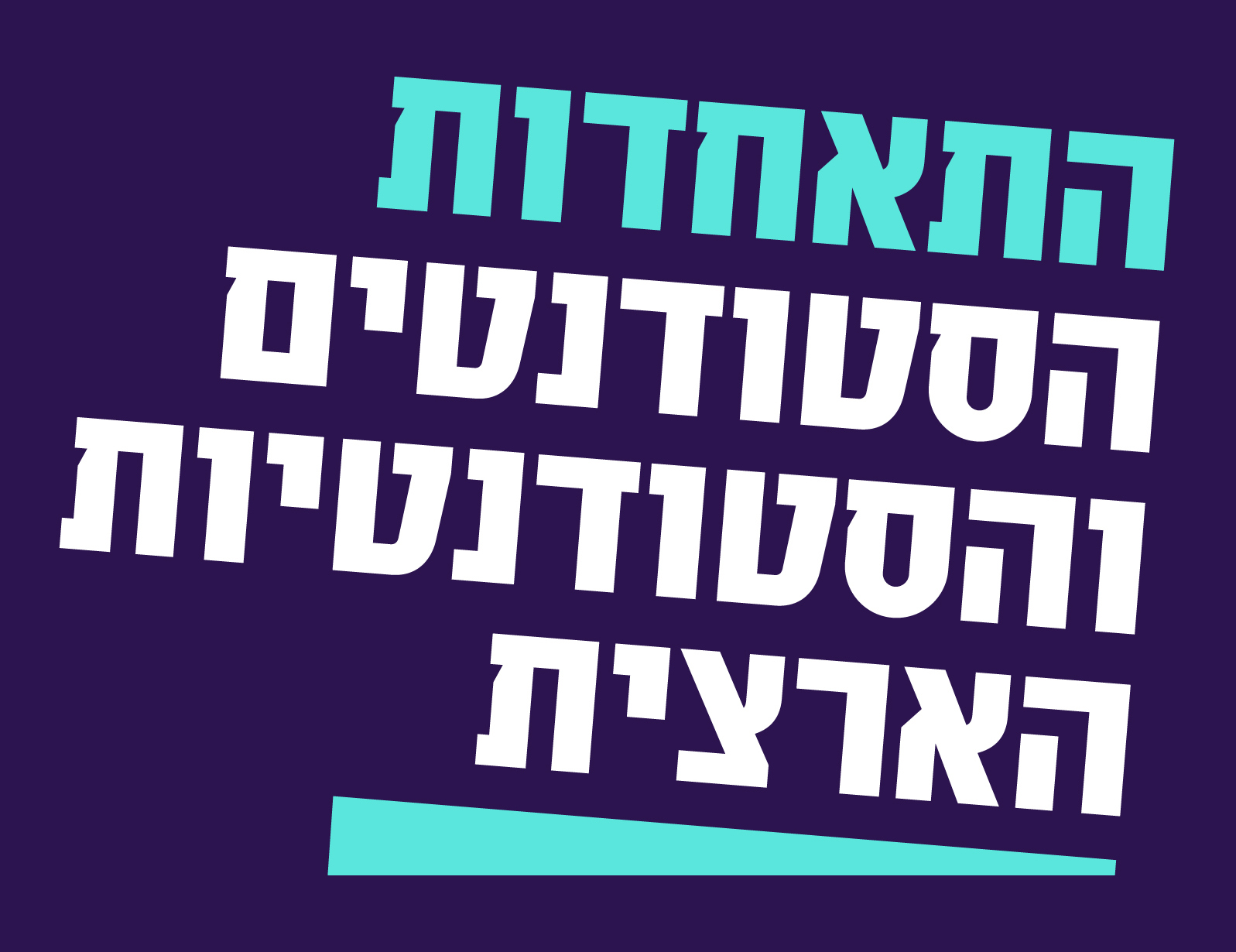
- National Union of Israeli Students Logo
- Formation: 1934; 92 years ago
- Type: NPO
- Purpose: Higher Education
- Headquarters: Abba Eban 8, Jerusalem
- Chairperson: Sivan Kore
- Vice Chairpersom: liran Bason
- CEO: Nir Tur
- Affiliations: European Students' Union
- Staff: 25
- Website: www.nuis.co.il

The National Union of Israeli Students (Hebrew: התאחדות הסטודנטים בישראל, Arabic: إتحاد الطلاب في إسرائيل; NUIS) has been the representative body of students' throughout Israel since 1934. Today NUIS represents over 400,000 students in over 64 Universities and Colleges. The Student Union is determined to play a decisive role in Israeli Society and it has placed social impact on a national level as an organizational priority. The Student Union believes that beyond their role of acquiring knowledge, students have the ability and responsibility to build and shape the society they live in and make a considerable impact in the long term.

== Structure ==
NUIS comprises professional departments enacting the policy created for the student community, by the Chairperson and the local student unions in each of the higher education institutes. The professional departments include: Social Involvement, Human Rights and Gender Equality, Scholarships, Academic Affairs, Policy and Research, Government Relations and Lobby, Minority Rights for Students, Fundraising and Foreign Relations, Spokesperson and Public Relations.

The National Union of Israeli Students will faithfully represent all students in Israel and will enhance the status of Israeli students.

The National Union of Israeli Students will shape the future leadership and influence Israel’s public agenda in all fields, and in education and higher education in particular, from its unique perspective.

The National Union of Israeli Students will strengthen ties with student organizations and youth organizations between communities and organizations in Israel and abroad.

— from The National Union of Israeli Students Vision

=== The Department of Academic Affairs ===
The department works first and foremost to advance the quality of learning and the accessibility of Israel’s young population to higher education institutes and vocational schools. Secondly, it represents pro student legislation and the student community before the council for higher education and the planning and budget committees. Thirdly, it aids individual students who struggle inside the system or encounter difficult positions in the academic sphere.

=== The Unit for the Advancement of Minority Students ===
The unit operates as part of the academic department. Its core goal is to identify methods, activate projects and implement recommendations advancing the integration of students from minority communities into the academy. The department’s projects empower the minority students, bridge over the existing gaps within the academy and bring sectors closer together.

=== The Scholarship Department ===
The department has made a goal of encouraging and leading social change and empower the involvement of students in community and in what is happening in Israeli society. The department strives to lighten the student economic burden of academic studies by granting scholarship in exchange for their activity in a community involvement framework. Additionally, the department is a leading body in Israel for the provision of information regarding scholarships to students.

=== The Department for Policy and Research ===
The department works to advance policy and legislation for the improvement of the status of youth and students in Israel, by establishing a body that can derive research and thought. The overall purpose of the department is to provide a centralized support service to all parts of the union and specifically to assist NUIS representatives with clear information and analysis to equip them for effective performance and informed decision-making in the development of union policy.

=== The Department for Social Involvement ===
The department acts to advance student involvement in the social sphere in Israel. It aims to enhance the personal awareness and participation of students in projects promoting a positive and equal social reality in Israel. By encouraging individual and group student initiatives, the department molds the student’s status as one who plays a crucial role in regard to struggles relating to the academic world as well as in other fields such as social justice human rights, environment and society.

=== The Department of Fundraising and Foreign Relations ===
By generating a joint dialogue and a relationship based on common values and understandings, the department aims at developing and deepening the relationship between the student public in Israel and the student publics all over the world. The department represents NUIS in the international arena, taking an active role in the Israel public diplomacy efforts, and it is a full member of the European Student Union (ESU) and the World Union of Jewish Students (WUJS). The department also represents NUIS in the national and international philanthropic and business world in order to increase NUIS income for the benefit of the Israeli students public.

=== Spokesperson and the Department for Public Relations ===
The department is responsible for the branding and image of the student union. Works to explain and reflect the Union’s policy and its decision making as well as promote its goals and core projects in various fields to the Student Associations. Additionally, the department operates in the new media channels among them: Facebook, Twitter and YouTube in order to strengthen the direct and unhindered connection between the students in Israel and the world.

== Activities and positions ==
The Union attracted international attention in 2010 when its president, Boaz Torporovsky, announced a plan to send a Kurdish Freedom Flotilla "to deliver much-needed humanitarian assistance to the Kurds of Turkey." Torporovsky describes the plan as a reaction to the Free Gaza flotillas. He told a reporter that, "There’s a lot of hypocrisy in the world. Turkey, which leads the campaign against Israel and makes all sorts of threats, is the same Turkey that carried out a holocaust and murdered an entire nation of Armenians, and oppresses a minority larger than the Palestinians – the Kurds – who deserve a state, who have demanded a state for longer than the State of Israel has existed."

In the Summer of 2011 citizens of the State of Israel took part in a social protest which was one of the most important event in Israel those years. The National Union and local unions from across the country were extremely important force in promoting and expanding the fight.

In 2023, the head of the Union, Elchanan Felhimer, refused to speak out against the planned judicial reform, even after other major organisations – ranging from the Union of Local Authorities to the Histadrut trade union federation – supported the protests. Felhimer claimed that the student union was not a political organisation.

In 2024, the Union advocated legislation to sanction university lecturers who express criticism of Israel and its policies. The proposed law would require academic institutions to “immediately” dismiss, without compensation, lecturers who express themselves “in a way that includes the denial of Israel’s existence as a Jewish and democratic state.” If an institution does not comply with the law, the chairman of the Council for Higher Education can cut its budget.

== Members ==
NUIS is an umbrella organization that unites local student unions from different universities and colleges in Israel:

1. Ariel University
2. Ben-Gurion University of the Negev
3. Ben-Gurion University of the Negev - Eilat
4. Bar Ilan University
5. Tel Aviv University
6. Ort Braude
7. Ort Singalovsky
8. The Jerusalem College of Technology
9. Shenkar College of Engineering and Design
10. Givat Washington
11. The Hebrew University of Jerusalem
12. The Jerusalem Academy of Music and Dance
13. The Academic College of Tel Aviv Yafoo
14. Holon Institute of Technology
15. Beit Berl College
16. Western Galilee College
17. Hemdat Hadarom College
18. Kinneret College
19. Shamoon College of Engineering (SCE)
20. Azrieli College of Engineering Jerusalem
21. Efrata College of Education
22. Gordon College of Education
23. Sapir College
24. Max Stern Academic College of Emek Yezreel
25. Tzfat's Community College
26. Tel-Hai Academic College
27. Be’er Sheva Technological College
28. The David Yellin Academic College of Education
29. The College of Management Academic Studies
30. The Carmel Academic Center
31. The Academic Center of Law and Business
32. Peres Academic Center
33. Ruppin Academic Center
34. IDC Herzeliya
35. The College for Academic Studies in Or Yehuda
36. Achva Academic College
37. Ono Academic College
38. The Ultra Orthodox (Haredi) Campus
39. WIZO Haifa
40. Ohaloo College of Education
41. "Orot Israel” Academic College of Education
42. ORT Hermelin Academic College of Engineering and Technology
43. Ort Rehovot College
44. Oranim College
45. Emuna College
46. The Afeka Tel Aviv Academic College of Engineering
47. Ashkelon Academic College
48. Hadassah College Jerusalem
49. Wingate Institute
50. Levinsky College of Education
51. The Academic College of Israel in Ramat -Gan
52. Seminar HaKibutzim
53. Shaanan College
54. Sha'arei Mishpat College

== See also ==
- Israeli Students Organization
