= Mitzpe Hila =

Village in northern Israel

Mitzpe Hila: מִצְפֵּה הִלָּה (Hebrew)
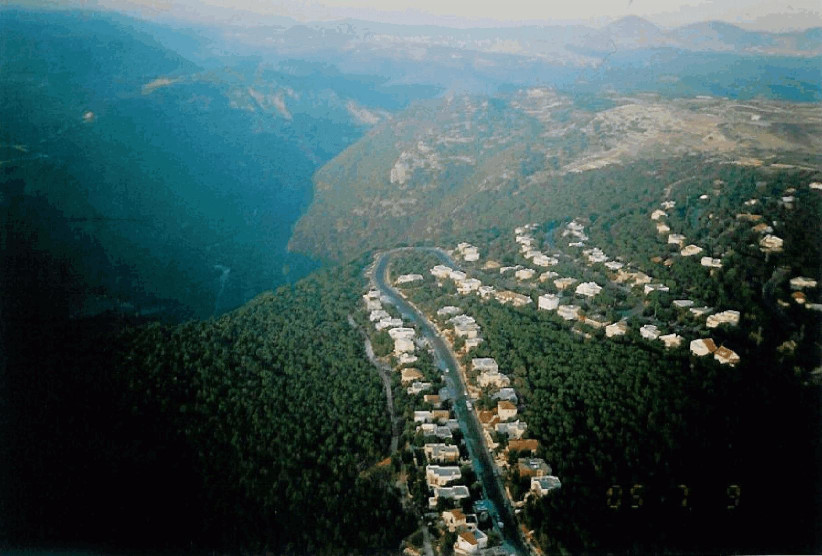

- Location within Northwest Israel Location within Israel
- Coordinates: 33°2′6″N 35°14′42″E
- Country: Israel
- District: Northern
- Subdistrict: Acre
- Council: Ma'ale Yosef
- Founded: 1980
- Population (2024): 464
- Website: www.summday.co.il/hila

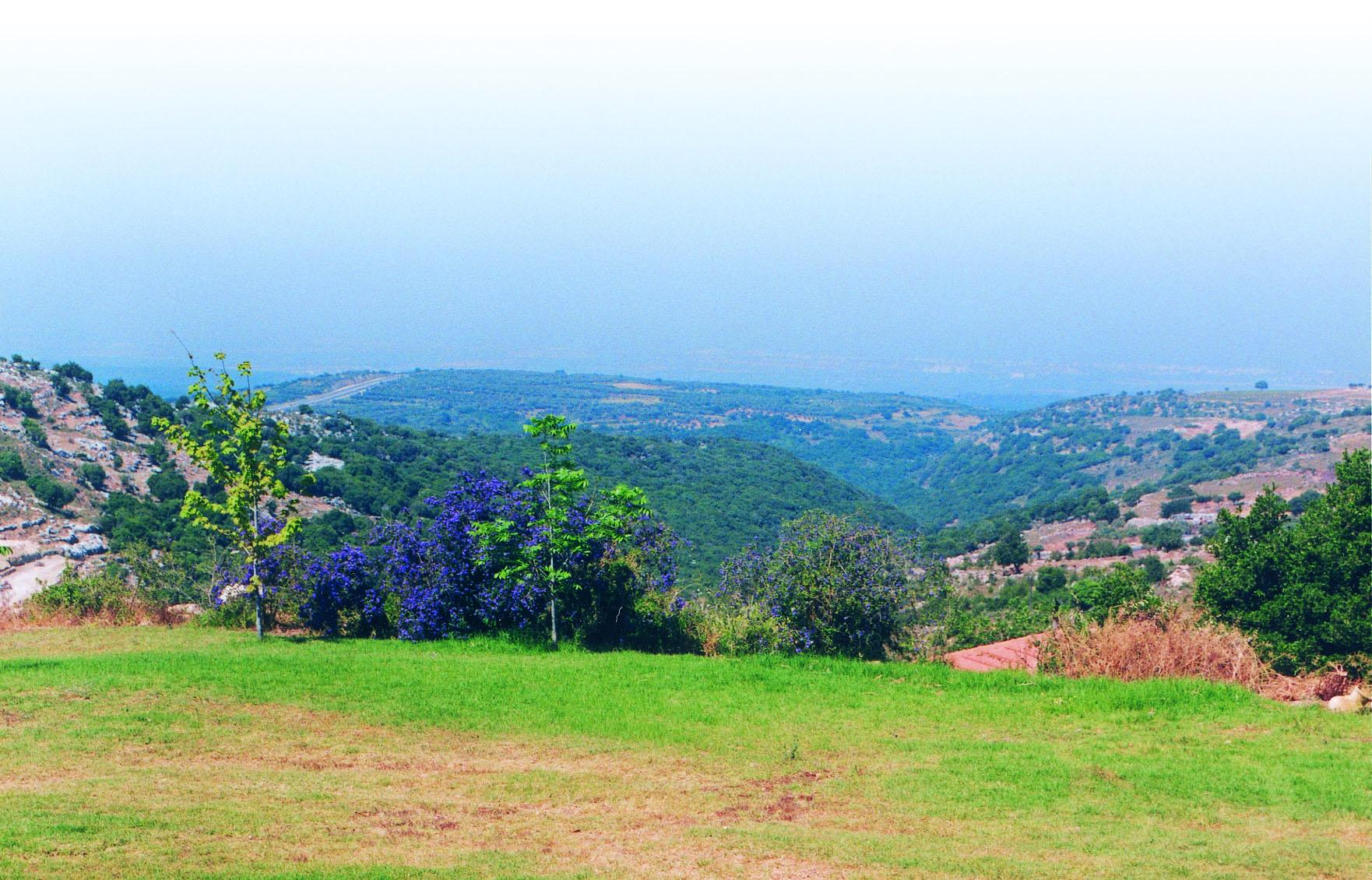
View from Mitzpe Hila

Mitzpe Hila (Hebrew: מִצְפֵּה הִלָּה, lit. Hila Lookout) or simply Hila is a community settlement in northern Israel. Located in the western Galilee hills near the Lebanese border, it falls under the jurisdiction of Ma'ale Yosef Regional Council. In 2024 it had a population of 464.

== History ==
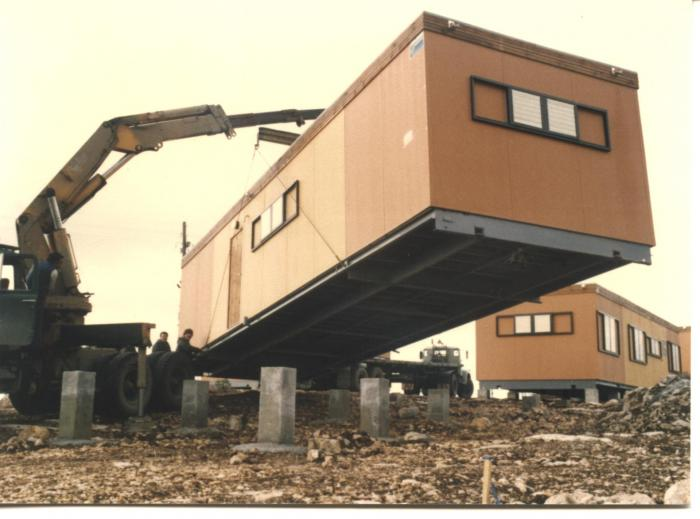
Posting of caravan in Mitzpe Hila, Israel, 1982

The village was established in 1980 as part of the "Lookouts in the Galilee" plan, with residents initially living in prefabricated homes imported from South Africa. It was originally named Mitzpe Ziv after Har Ziv, the mountain on which it was built. It was later renamed Mitzpe Hila.

Katyusha and Grad rockets fired by Hezbollah in the 1990s landed in the village, as did more rockets during the 2006 Lebanon War against Hezbollah. Otherwise it is a popular retreat for "internal tourism": Israelis seeking bed and breakfasts or rental cabins.

== Notable residents ==
- Gilad Shalit
