= Gilad Shalit =

Israeli former hostage and soldier (born 1986)

- גלעד שליט
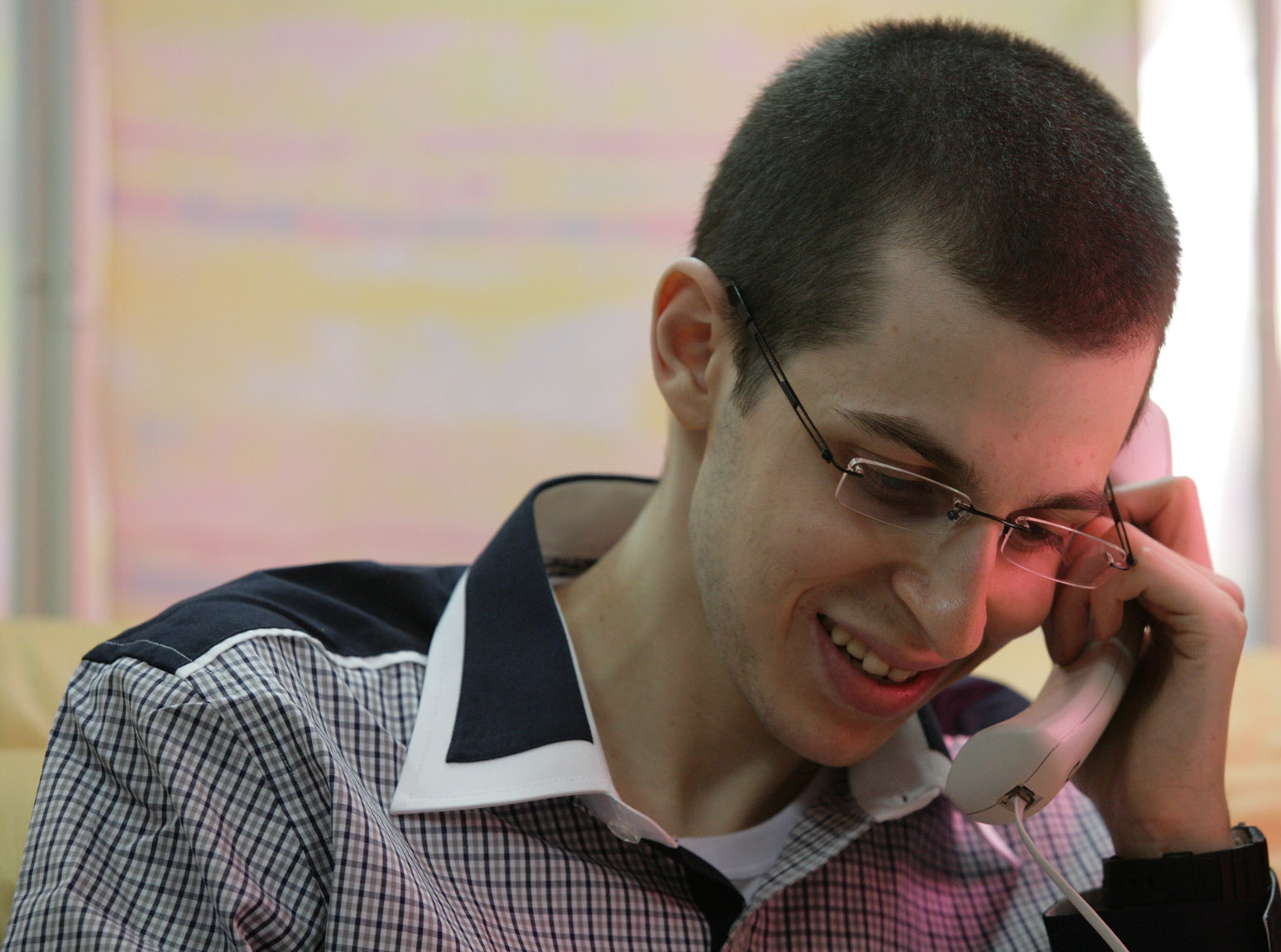
- Shalit on the phone with his parents, after arriving in Israel on 18 October 2011
- Born: 28 August 1986 (age 40); Nahariya, Israel
- Education: Manor Kabri High School
- Occupation: Sports columnist
- Known for: Captured in Israel by Palestinian militants, and held for five years until released in exchange for 1,027 Palestinian prisoners.
- Awards: Honorary citizen of Paris, Rome, Miami, New Orleans, Baltimore, and Pittsburgh
- Military career
- Allegiance: Israel
- Branch: Israeli Army
- Rank: Sergeant First Class
- Unit: Armor Corps

Gilad Shalit (Hebrew: גלעד שליט, Gilˁad Šaliṭ; born 28 August 1986) is an Israeli former soldier who, on 25 June 2006, was captured by Palestinian militants in a cross-border raid via tunnels near the Israeli border. Hamas held him captive for over five years until his release on 18 October 2011 as part of a prisoner exchange deal.

During his captivity, Hamas rejected requests from the International Committee of the Red Cross (ICRC) to visit Shalit, claiming that such visits could compromise his location. Several human rights organizations criticized this position, asserting that the conditions of Shalit's confinement were in violation of international humanitarian law. The Red Cross stated "The Shalit family have the right under international humanitarian law to be in contact with their son." In the early months, the sole means of communication was through an intermediary who claimed that a low-ranking Hamas official, Ghazi Hamad, asked him to convey to Shalit's parents the assurance that Shalit was "alive and was treated according to Islam's laws regarding prisoners of war. In other words, he had been given shelter, food, and medical care." The United Nations Fact Finding Mission on the Gaza Conflict called for Shalit's release in its September 2009 report. In the G8's Deauville Declaration of 27 May 2011, they demanded Shalit's release.

Many sources have categorized Shalit's capture as both a kidnapping and an abduction. During his captivity, he was denied visits from the Red Cross and communication with family members, both of which he was entitled to as a captured soldier under the Geneva Conventions. Furthermore, his captors demanded a form of ransom, although not necessarily of a monetary nature, in exchange for his release. The only instances of contact between Shalit and the outside world during his captivity, prior to his eventual release, consisted of three letters, an audio tape, and a DVD. These were provided to Israel in exchange for the release of 20 female Palestinian prisoners.

Shalit was captured near the Kerem Shalom crossing in Israel and was held by Hamas at an undisclosed location within the Gaza Strip. Hamas's initial demands, which included the release of all female and underage Palestinians, as well as Marwan Barghouti, were not met. On 18 October 2011, Shalit was eventually released in a negotiated agreement, securing his freedom after more than five years in isolation and captivity. In exchange, 1,027 Palestinian prisoners were released, some of whom were convicted of multiple murders and carrying out attacks against Israeli civilians. According to Israeli government sources, these released prisoners were collectively responsible for 569 Israeli deaths.

Shalit was the first Israeli soldier to be captured by Palestinian militants since the incident involving Nachshon Wachsman in 1994. Shalit held the rank of Corporal in the IDF's Armor Corps at the time of his capture, and he was subsequently promoted to Sergeant, Staff Sergeant, and Sergeant First Class just before his release. He holds dual Israeli and French citizenship, the latter via his grandmother.

== Early life and education ==
Shalit was born on 28 August 1986 in Nahariya, Israel, to Noam and Aviva Shalit. He has an older brother and a younger sister. He was raised from in Mitzpe Hila in the Western Galilee. He graduated with distinction from Manor Kabri High School. Shalit began military service in the Israel Defense Forces in July 2005, and "despite a low medical rating, chose to serve in a combat unit, following his older brother, Yoel, into the armored corps."

== Capture by Palestinian militants ==
=== Background ===
The capture of Shalit was one of the more notable events that took place during the June/July 2006 flare-up of hostilities between Gaza and Israel, the others being the Gaza beach explosion and the Muamar family detention incident. Noam Chomsky has drawn attention to the cause-and-effect and also to the differences in treatment in the Western media between the Muamar detention that took place a day earlier, and the abduction of Gilad Shalit. The Israeli army seized the two Palestinian Muamar brothers in an overnight raid into the southern Gaza Strip on 24 June 2006, who were accused of being members of Hamas and planning attacks on Israel. Hamas said they were sons of a member but were not involved in Hamas.

According to a report by the Army Radio, published nearly a year after the occurrence, the IDF had received a warning on 24 June 2006, the day before Shalit was captured, about a planned abduction. Israeli security forces entered the Gaza Strip and arrested the two brothers. The report said that the brothers were transferred to Israel for interrogation, and that the information extracted formed the basis for the warning that militants would try to enter Israel through tunnels to capture soldiers stationed near Gaza. As of January 2012 the brothers were still in an Israeli jail, held without trial for over five years.

=== Capture ===
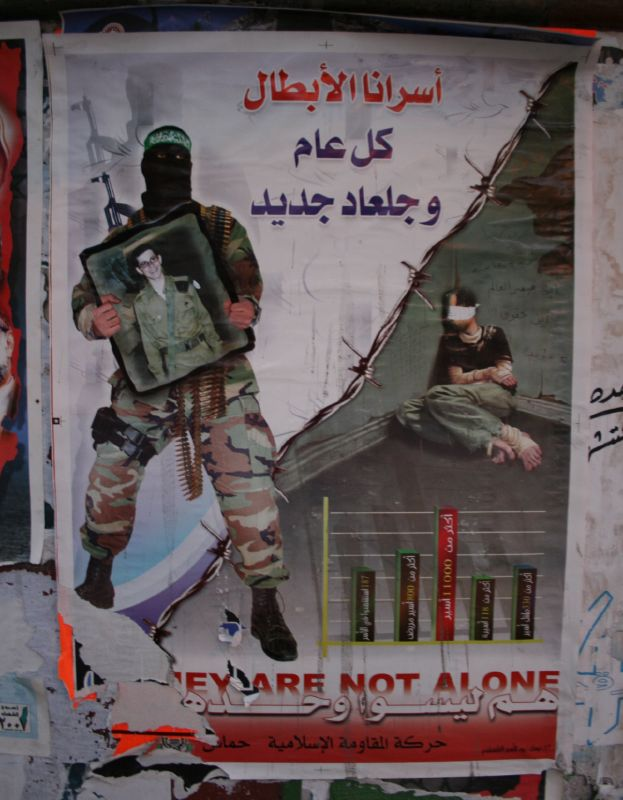
Shalit on a Hamas poster in Nablus, 7 May 2007 that reads: "Our champion captives. May we have a new Gilad each year”; and below: “They [Palestinian prisoners] are not alone".

Early on 25 June 2006, Palestinian militants from the Izz ad-Din al-Qassam Brigades, Popular Resistance Committees, and Army of Islam crossed into Israel from the Gaza Strip through a tunnel near Kerem Shalom and attacked an IDF post. Two Israeli soldiers were killed and another two, apart from Shalit, were wounded. Two of the attacking Palestinian militants were also killed. Shalit suffered a broken left hand and a light shoulder wound, and the militants captured him and took him via a tunnel into Gaza.

Shalit's captors issued a statement the following day, offering information on Shalit if Israel were to agree to release all female Palestinian prisoners and all Palestinian prisoners under the age of 18. The statement was issued by the Izz ad-Din al-Qassam Brigades, the Popular Resistance Committees (which includes members of Fatah, Islamic Jihad, and Hamas), and a previously unknown group calling itself the Army of Islam.

Shalit was the first Israeli soldier captured by Palestinians since Nachshon Wachsman, in 1994. His capture and the following cross-border raid by Hezbollah, resulting in the capture of IDF soldiers Ehud Goldwasser and Eldad Regev into Lebanon, occurred prior to the conflicts in Gaza and Lebanon during summer 2006.

The high-ranking Hamas commander whom Israel considers responsible for masterminding Shalit's capture, Abu Jibril Shimali, was killed during the violent clashes between Hamas and the al-Qaida-affiliated Jund Ansar Allah organization in Gaza in August 2009.

=== Rescue attempt ===
Israeli forces entered Khan Yunis on 28 June 2006 to restore quiet after repeated rocket attacks. Freeing Shalit was not one of the objectives of the mission called "Summer Rains". According to an Israeli embassy spokesperson, "Israel did everything it could in exhausting all diplomatic options and gave Mahmoud Abbas the opportunity to return the abducted Israeli… This operation can be terminated immediately, conditioned on the release of Gilad Shalit." On the same day, four Israeli Air Force aircraft flew over Syrian President Bashar al-Assad's palace in Latakia, because Israel views the Syrian leadership as a sponsor of Hamas, according to an IDF spokesperson. The operation did not succeed in finding Shalit.

On 29 June, the commander of the Israeli Southern Command, Aluf Yoav Galant, confirmed that Shalit was still in Gaza. Israel's minister of justice, Haim Ramon, added that Shalit was being held in southern Gaza, specifically. A military correspondent for the Israel Broadcasting Authority said that Shalit was being held captive in Rafah in southern Gaza, and that there was indication that he was still alive. However, IDF spokesperson Brig. Gen. Miri Regev said: "we are not convinced he is being held in southern Gaza… [only] that he is being held in Gaza".

On 1 July, the BBC reported that Shalit had been treated by a Palestinian physician for a broken hand and a light shoulder wound. Israeli government authorities threatened that the "sky will fall" if Shalit were harmed. On the same day, Shalit's captors demanded that Israel release an additional 1,000 Palestinian prisoners and end the assault on Gaza (in addition to the release of all female and minor prisoners, as previously demanded).

=== Diplomatic efforts ===
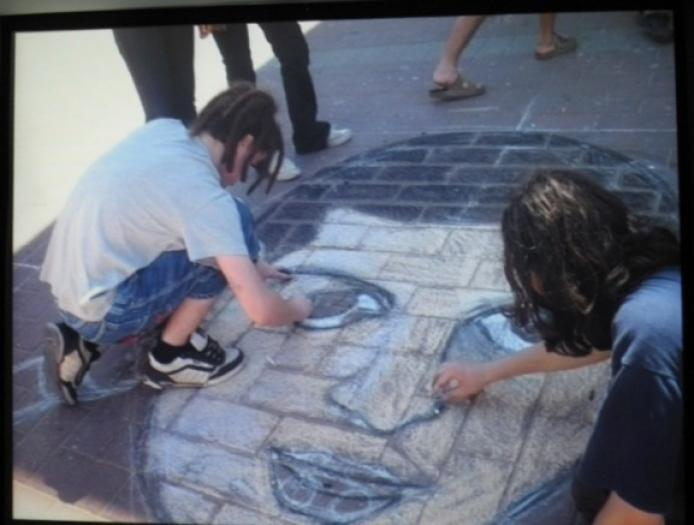
"Free Gilad" sidewalk painting

Prime Minister Ehud Olmert immediately ruled out negotiations with Shalit's captors, demanding his unconditional release. "There will be no negotiations to release prisoners," the Prime Minister's Bureau said in a statement. "The government of Israel will not give in to extortion by the Palestinian Authority and the Hamas government, which are headed by murderous terror organizations. The Palestinian Authority bears full responsibility for the welfare of Gilad Shalit and for returning him to Israel in good condition."

The Apostolic Nuncio to Israel, Archbishop Antonio Franco, attempted to secure Shalit's release via the Catholic Church's Gaza-based parish. He was not successful. In September 2006, Egyptian mediators received a letter in which Shalit wrote that he was alive and well. The handwriting was confirmed to be that of Shalit. In October, Egypt was also reported to be negotiating with Hamas on behalf of Israel for Shalit's release.

On 28 October 2006, the Popular Resistance Committees (PRC) said in a statement that all three parties had agreed to a proposal by Egyptian mediators regarding Shalit's release. The PRC did not provide details but said that the Egyptian proposal would include the release of Palestinians held by Israel. It was the first time since Shalit's capture that any of the factions indicated that his release might be imminent. In November 2006, Hamas leader Khaled Mashal indicated that Shalit was alive and in good health.

On 9 January 2007, Abu Mujahed, a spokesman for the captors, asserted that Shalit:

...has not been harmed at all ... He is being treated in accordance with Islamic values regulating the treatment of prisoners of war.

He also said: "We have managed to keep the soldier in captivity for six months and we have no problem keeping him for years." On 17 January 2007, one of the captor groups, the Army of Islam headed by Mumtaz Dormush, claimed that Shalit was being held exclusively by Hamas. On 8 March 2007, Jerusalem Post reported that an agreement had been reached with Hamas over the number of prisoners Israel would release in return for Shalit. Israel and Hamas were still negotiating specific prisoners who Hamas wanted freed in return for Shalit. On 7 April 2007, it was reported that Shalit's captors had transferred to Israel, through Egyptian mediators, a list of Palestinian prisoners they wanted freed. The list included names of approximately 1,300 prisoners, some of whom were high-ranking Fatah members.

On 25 June 2007, a year after Shalit's capture, the Izz ad-Din al-Qassam Brigades released an audio tape on YouTube in which Shalit is heard sending a message to his family, friends, and the Israeli government and army, and appealing for a prisoner-swap deal to be reached to secure his release. Shalit said that his medical condition was deteriorating, and that he required immediate and lengthy hospitalization. On 4 February 2008, it was reported that Hamas had sent Shalit's family a second letter written by him. The handwriting was confirmed to be that of Shalit.

Shalit's father, Noam, met with former United States President Jimmy Carter during Carter's April 2008 visit to Israel. Carter planned to visit Hamas leader Khaled Mashal in Damascus later. Noam Shalit said that the fact that Carter was not considered pro-Israel could be beneficial in securing his son's release. On 9 June 2008, it was reported that Hamas sent Shalit's family a third letter. The group had promised to send them a third letter after mediation from Carter. The handwriting was confirmed to be Shalit's.

On 12 August 2008, Hamas said that it was suspending talks on Shalit's release, demanding a complete lifting of the Israeli siege. The decision angered Egypt, a mediator for Shalit's release. Hamas criticized the Egyptians for linking the opening of the Rafah border crossing with Shalit's release, a condition to which Hamas refused to agree.

On 20 August 2008, in his briefing to the United Nations Security Council, the Under-Secretary-General of the UN appeared to link the decision to release 200 Palestinian prisoners to the case, though a Hamas spokesman saw it as an attempt to increase Palestinian internal divisions by releasing only those loyal to the Fatah faction.

On 11 May 2010, Russian President Dmitry Medvedev called for Shalit to be freed "as soon as possible". He made the call while meeting Hamas leaders in Damascus, Syria. "The Russian president urged solving the problem of releasing Israeli citizen Gilad Shalit as soon as possible," his spokeswoman said. Russia is the only country that has direct dialogue with Hamas. Hamas leader Khaled Meshaal reportedly said Hamas would only consider releasing Shalit when Israel resumed talks to free Palestinian prisoners.

German President Christian Wulff also helped call for the release of Gilad Shalit.

=== Negotiations for release ===
Shalit's father had blamed the U.S. for blocking talks on his son's release. Netanyahu responded to a pilgrimage march, called by Shalit's father for his release, by saying he was willing to release 1,000 Palestinian prisoners in exchange for Shalit, but that top Hamas leaders would not be among those released.

In early 2011, Egyptian-moderated negotiations continued between the Israeli government and Hamas, represented by Ahmed Jabari. Haaretz reported that Israel proposed a prisoner swap, and threatened that if Hamas rejected the proposal, no swap would occur. Hamas responded by warning that an end to negotiations would lead to Shalit's "disappearance." Negotiations were hung up over disagreements between the two parties regarding Israel's unwillingness to release all of the so-called "senior prisoners" into the West Bank—a demand Hamas rejects—and regarding the particulars of releasing prisoners who were leaders of Hamas and other organizations. On 11 October 2011, the Pan-Arabist Al Arabiya network reported that Israel and Hamas had reached an agreement on Shalit. Netanyahu convened a special Cabinet meeting to approve the Shalit deal.

Shalit's release negotiations include the release of 1,027 Hamas and Palestinian prisoners by Israel.

Despite poor relations with Israel at the time, the Republic of Turkey played a significant yet silent role in Shalit's release.

President Peres publicly thanked Turkish prime minister Recep Tayyip Erdoğan for showing compassion to Shalit. On 18 October 2011, Shalit was transferred to Israel. The IDF transferred him, via helicopter, to the base in Tel-Nof, where he was reunited with his parents and met the prime minister Benjamin Netanyahu. In the base he went through medical tests; it was found that he was malnourished and suffered from vitamin deficiencies. After the tests were completed, he was then transferred by helicopter to his home, where many who supported his release waited outside his house to see his return. Shalit subsequently began to rehabilitate with IDF assistance.

=== Debate in Israel ===
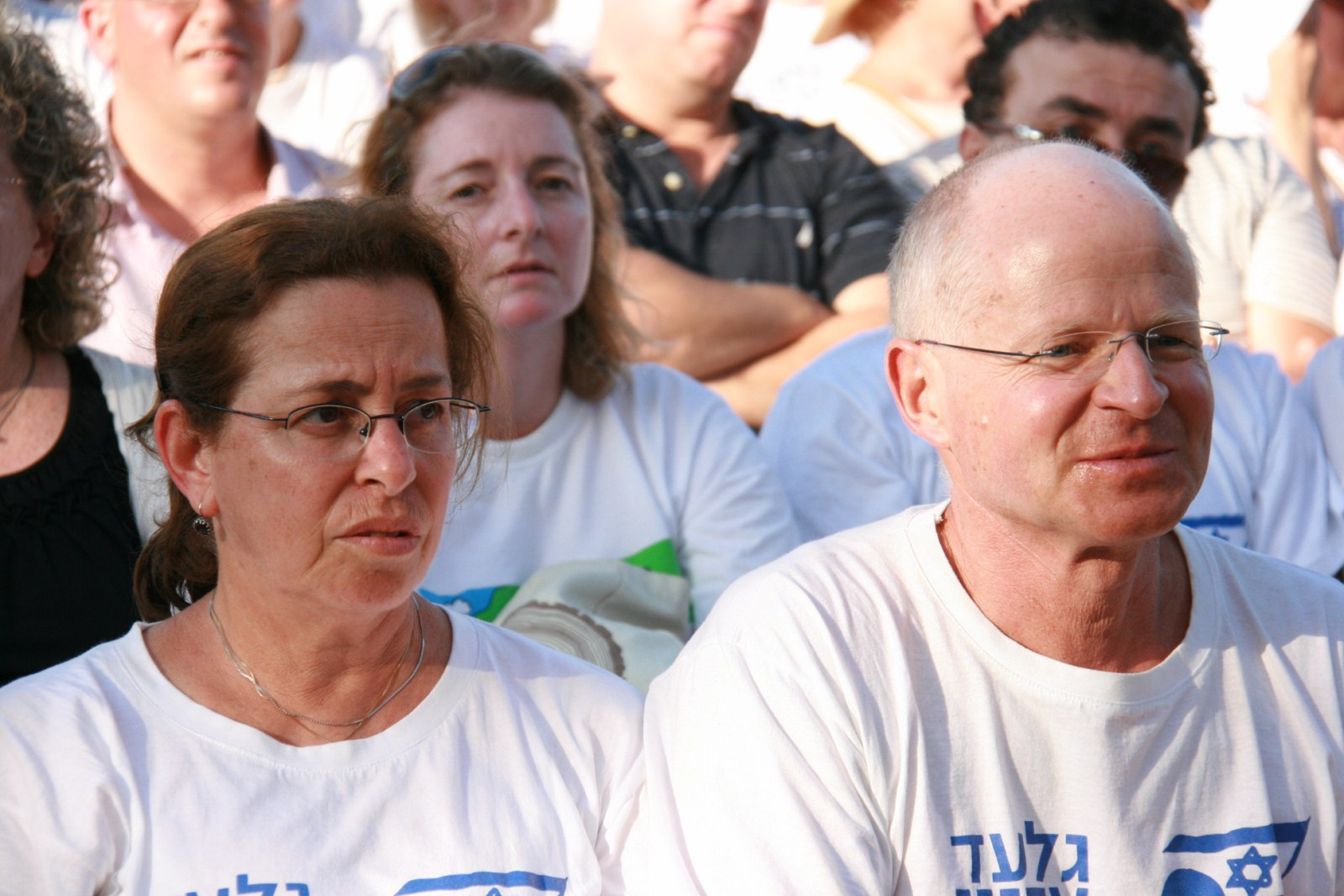
Shalit's parents, July 2010

The vast majority of Israel's citizens were in favor of the deal, although a vocal minority opposed it, creating essentially two camps. One camp supported the release of Shalit on Hamas's conditions. According to the Dahaf Polling Institute, 79 percent of Israelis favoured this deal, which included the release of over 1,000 Palestinian prisoners and the deportation of some of them outside the territory of the Palestinian National Authority or restricting them to Gaza.

A second camp said that Shalit should be released, but not on Hamas's conditions. They argued that the correct approach is to protect Israelis if the prisoners are released. According to the Dahaf Polling Institute, 14 percent of Israelis were in this camp. Others believe that the disagreement among Israelis represented rifts and changes within Israeli society. Attorney Dalia Gavriely-Nur, a lecturer at Bar-Ilan University, said that the camp opposing the prisoners deal was holding onto a view of collectivist society, in which the individual was expected to sacrifice himself for the good of society; the camp supporting the prisoner release was expressing, however, a high value on the sanctity of life, that symbolizes a shift to a more privatized society. Noam Shalit, Gilad's father, urged the UN to take all possible measures to implement the findings of the Goldstone Report. The Goldstone Report called for Shalit's immediate release and, while he was in captivity, for access to him by the International Committee of the Red Cross.

On the evening of Shalit's 23rd birthday, on 28 August 2009, thousands attended a vigil for Shalit at the Western Wall, and dozens of activists protested outside Defense Ministry headquarters in Tel Aviv, slamming Defense Minister Ehud Barak and criticizing IDF Chief of Staff Gabi Ashkenazi. The Jewish Internet Defense Force (JIDF) organized in August 2009 a pro-Shalit campaign on the social networking site Twitter. Twitter users drove Shalit's name to the second-highest trend on the day of his 23rd birthday. Tweets for Shalit ranged from the demand "Free Shalit", to requests for international supervision of the case.

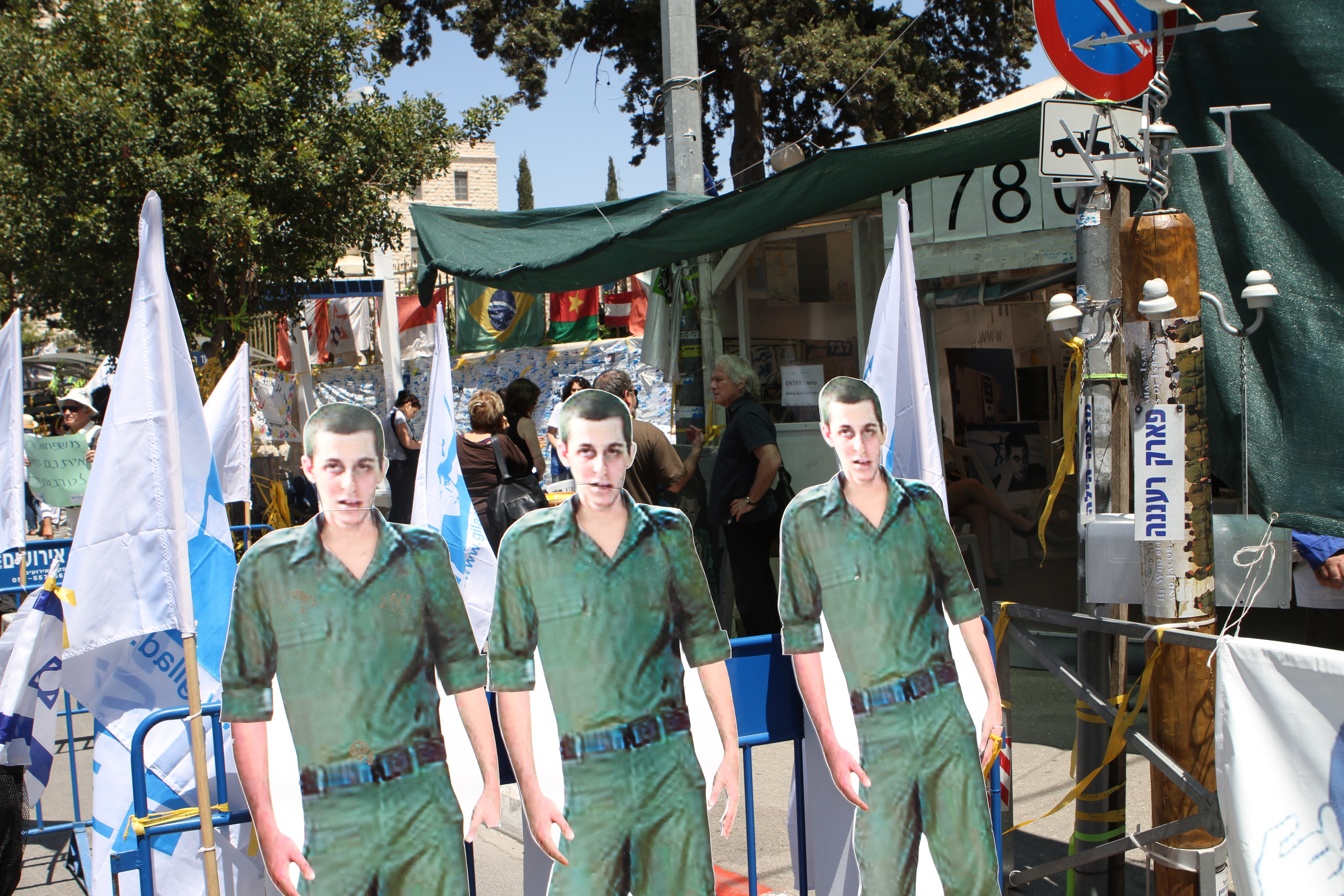
Shalit Protest Tent in Jerusalem, May 2011

In several incidents during 2009, leaders of the campaign to free Shalit demonstrated at the prisons in which Palestinian detainees were held, preventing visits by Palestinian prisoners' families. One such demonstration at the Erez crossing on the Gaza border blocked the passage of food and medicine to the Gaza Strip. Israel said it would not ease its blockade of Gaza until Shalit was freed. Israeli opponents of such a deal spoke out, warning that releasing top Palestinian militants could result in the deaths of many Israelis in renewed attacks, as well as increased Palestinian motivation to abduct more soldiers in the future. Israeli analyst Dan Schueftan called the possible swap deal "the greatest significant victory for terrorism that Israel has made possible."

On 17 October 2011, Purdue University Professor Louis Rene Beres made the case against freeing Shalit in an op-ed column in the Jerusalem Post:

No modern government has the legal right to free terrorists in exchange for its own kidnapped citizens, military or civilian. Under long-standing international law, every state has a primary obligation to protect its citizens. Yet it appears that tomorrow, Israel Prime Minister Binyamin Netanyahu will exchange Palestinian terrorists for kidnapped IDF soldier Gilad Schalit. Any such exchange, however humane to Schalit and his family, would imperil thousands of other Israelis.

=== Captivity ===
In early December 2008, during a Hamas rally in Gaza City to mark 21 years since its founding, a Hamas member masquerading as Shalit was paraded by Hamas militia members. Hamas's refusal to negotiate about the status of Shalit or even to provide further information about his status strained the temporary Israel-Hamas cease-fire enacted in June 2008.

At the start of the Gaza War, Hamas claimed Shalit had been wounded by Israeli fire. On 11 January 2009, Abu Marzuk, Deputy Chief of the Hamas Political Ministry, told the London-based Arabic daily Al-Hayat that "Shalit may have been wounded, and he may not have been. The subject no longer interests us. We are not interested in his well-being at all, and we are not giving him any special guard since he is as good as a cat or less."

On 22 January 2009, Israel indicated that it was willing to swap Palestinians held in Israeli jails for Shalit as part of a longer-term truce after the three-week military operation in Gaza. On 26 January 2009, it was reported that Israel was offering to free 1,000 prisoners in exchange for Shalit. On 16 March 2009, it was reported that a prisoner-swap deal to gain Shalit's release was close, and the negotiation team was urged to wrap up the deal. Israel agreed to release more than 1,000 Palestinian prisoners, but there were still disagreements over the number of prisoners. The negotiation team however deadlocked over the release of 450 "heavyweight" prisoners. According to a senior source in the PM's Office, "a deal cannot be finalized on such terms, and there's nothing to vote on [in the government session] Tuesday". In May 2009, President Shimon Peres invited Shalit's family to meet Pope Benedict XVI at the President's residence in Jerusalem.

In June 2009, Israeli human rights group B'Tselem published an ad in the West Bank Palestinian newspaper Al-Quds, calling on Hamas to release Shalit "immediately and unconditionally", but the Gaza-based daily Palestine refused to print it, according to a B'Tselem spokeswoman. In July 2009, Hamas TV in Gaza broadcast a short animated movie that depicted Shalit chained to a jail cell wall, pleading with a Palestinian boy to be set free. The boy refuses, saying he has relatives in Israeli prisons.

In July 2009, Noam Shalit, Gilad's father, testified before the Goldstone Committee, which was investigating on behalf of the United Nations illegal conduct by combatants during Gaza War. Shalit told the committee that his son has lived without human rights for three years, and that no one, including the Red Cross, knows what happened to him or has paid him a visit. The Jerusalem Post reported that it obtained photographs showing children at the graduation ceremony of a Hamas-run summer camp, reenacting Shalit's abduction. The photos were reported to show Osama Mazini, a senior Hamas political official in charge of the Shalit negotiations with Israel, attending the play.

On 30 September 2009, Israel announced that it would release 20 female Palestinian prisoners in exchange for a video proving Shalit was still alive. The video was attributed to intervention by Switzerland. The exchange took place successfully on 2 October.

Hamas turned over a two-minute 40-second video to Israel. Senior IDF officers, Defense Minister Ehud Barak, and Prime Minister Benjamin Netanyahu viewed the footage, after which Barak spoke to Shalit's father Noam and grandfather Zvi by telephone. The video was sent to the Shalit family home in Mitzpe Hila, with the family reportedly viewing it together. Members of the Israeli negotiating team for Shalit's release viewed the footage to ensure it met with Israel's demands, primarily with regard to how recently it was filmed. The video on YouTube, the only contact from Shalit other than three letters written by him and an audio tape released in June 2007, was released to the public at around 4:00 in the afternoon on Israeli television. In the video, Shalit is seen sitting in a chair in a bare room, looking frail and emaciated but otherwise healthy. He addressed Netanyahu and his parents, and reminisced about times he spent with his family. At the end of the video, he stated that the "Mujahideen of the Izz ad-Din al-Qassam Brigades are treating me very well". During the video, he held up a newspaper dated 14 September 2009.

Israel transferred 19 Palestinian women being held in Hadarim Prison near Netanya to the Ofer and Shikma detention facilities, ahead of their final release. As soon as it was determined that the video met Israel's demands, the detainees were released and turned over to Red Cross vehicles, which transported them to the West Bank. Another female prisoner was slated for release by the Israel Prison Service, but it was found that she had already been released for good behavior. Another female prisoner was then selected as her substitute and released on 4 October.

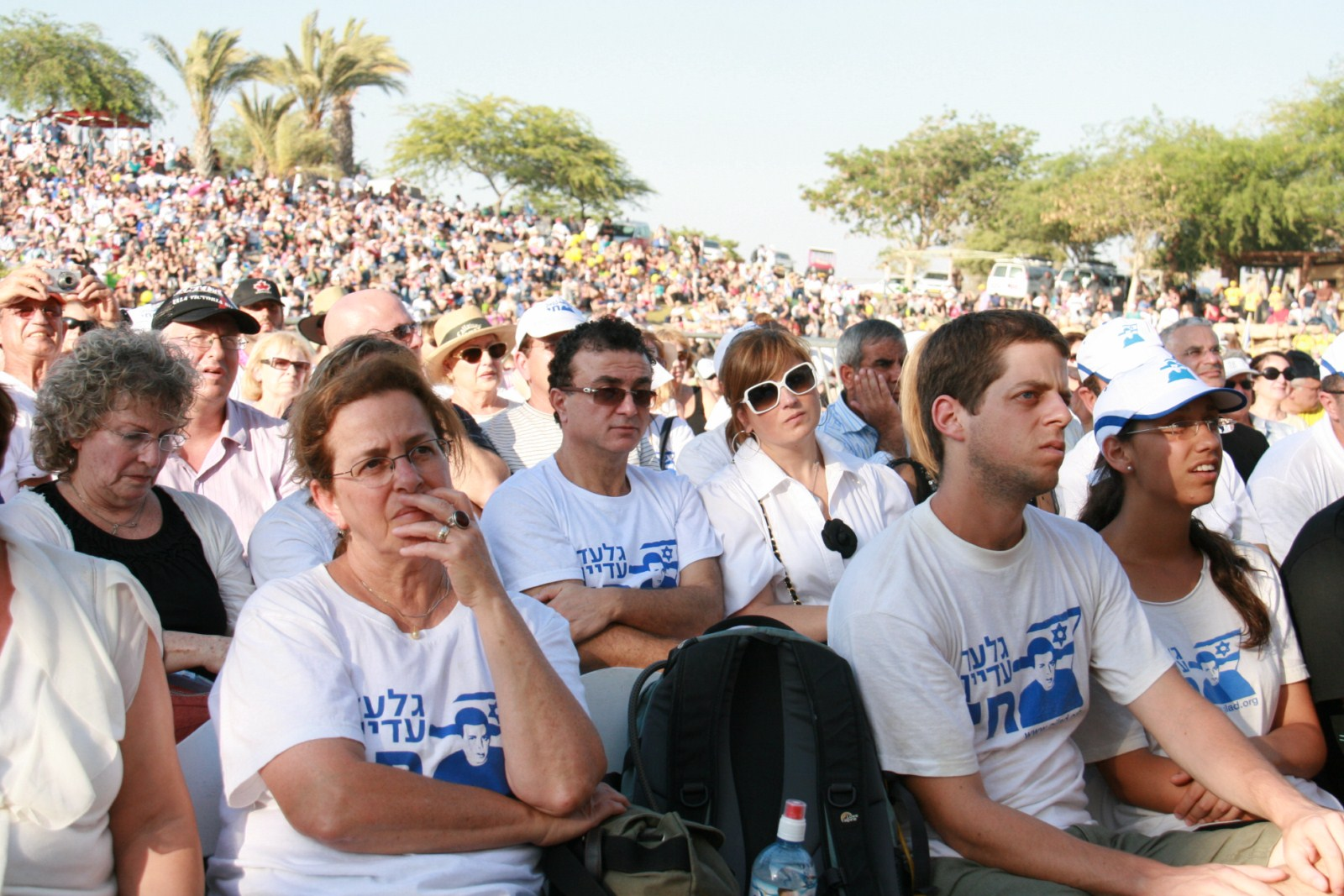
Shalit's mother and brother at IPO solidarity concert

In 2010, at least two cathedrals in Switzerland turned off their lights for several minutes in solidarity with Shalit. On the fourth anniversary of Shalit's abduction, the lights of the Colosseum were turned off. and so were the lights around the Old City walls in Jerusalem. A flotilla of ships, called The True Freedom Flotilla, sailed around the Statue of Liberty and past the United Nations.

In late June 2010, Shalit's parents organized a march from Shalit's hometown to the Prime Minister's residence in Jerusalem and were joined by 10,000 people. Shalit's parents stated that they would not go home until he was freed. On the fifth day of the march, as it reached Hadera, Israel agreed to a German-mediated prisoner exchange deal. Under the deal, Hamas would release Shalit, and Israel would release 1,000 Palestinian prisoners. However, Israel stated that the released Palestinians would be barred from entering the West Bank, since this location would afford them access to Israeli cities. Israel also refused to release "arch-terrorists" as part of the deal. Hamas responded by saying that the problem was with who Israel was willing to release, not how many. Hamas demanded that Israel release 450 prisoners jailed for violent attacks on Israelis, but Israel refused to agree to release most of them. In an address, Israeli Prime Minister Netanyahu said Israel was willing to pay a heavy price for Shalit, "but not any price". Shalit's grandfather Zvi called these comments a "death sentence" for Gilad.

When a pro-Gilad Shalit release march entered Jerusalem on 8 July, it was met by a group of protesters holding signs "Gilad – Not at any cost" and "Don't give up to terror". The protesters had red ribbons on their hands symbolizing the blood of possible future terror victims resulting from any exchange in terrorists for Shalit's release.

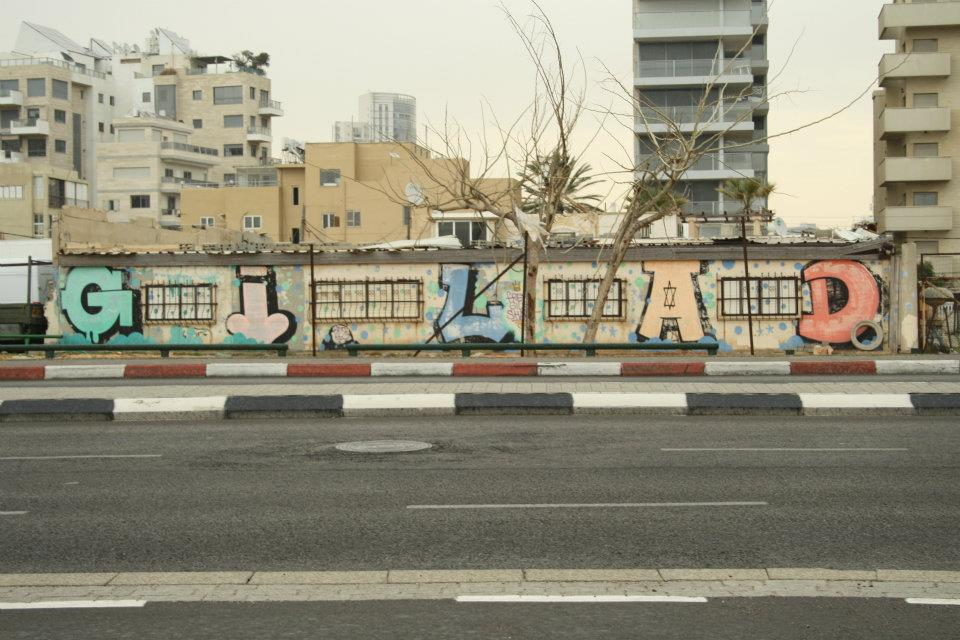
Graffiti for Shalit, Tel Aviv

In October 2010, Hamas officials claimed to have thwarted an attempt to locate Shalit. A collaborator in Hamas's military wing was allegedly caught planting bugs in two-way radios. Hamas leaders said the informer maintained relationships with top Hamas commanders in order to learn where Shalit was being held.

At the end of November 2010, PA President Mahmoud Abbas called for Shalit to be released, comparing his situation to that of Arab prisoners held in Israeli prisons. In June 2011, French President Nicolas Sarkozy and German Chancellor Angela Merkel, at a joint press conference, issued a call for Shalit's release. This followed Shalit's father, Noam, filing a suit in France to investigate his son's abduction. Shalit is a dual citizen of Israel and France.

=== Gilad Shalit prisoner swap deal ===
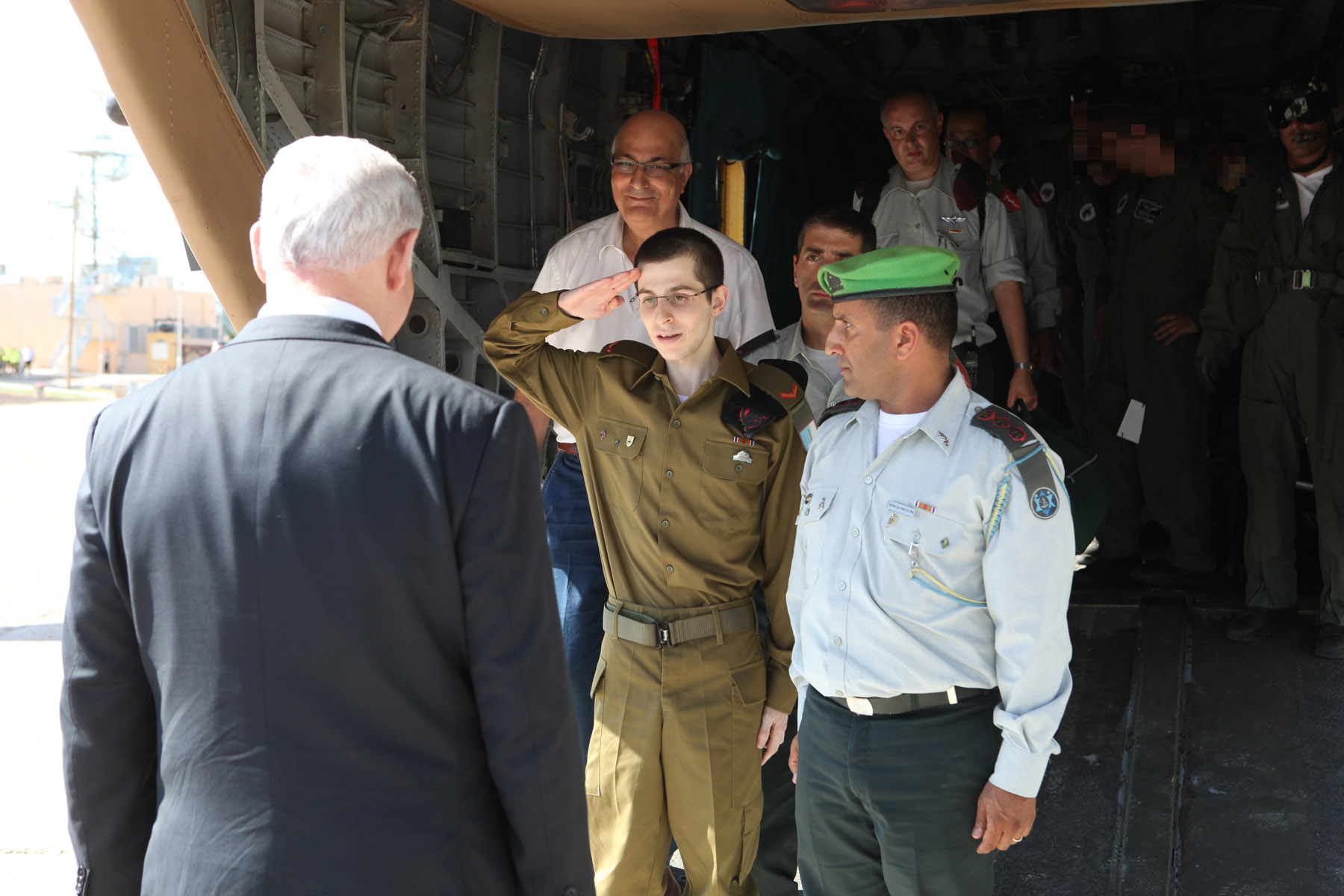
Shalit salutes Israeli prime minister Benjamin Netanyahu, 18 October 2011

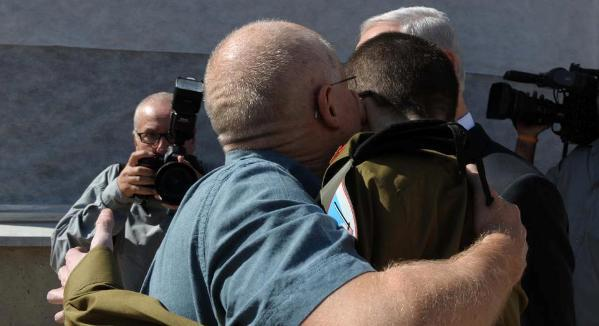
Shalit meets his father after five years in captivity, 18 October 2011

Five years and four months after Shalit was captured by Palestinian militants in southern Israel, a deal was reached between Israel and Hamas to release Shalit in exchange for 1,027 Palestinian and Israeli Arab prisoners. The deal was brokered by German and Egyptian mediators and signed in Egypt on 11 October 2011. Its first phase was executed on 18 October, with Israel releasing 450 Palestinian prisoners and Hamas transferring Shalit to Cairo.

==== Release ====
On 18 October 2011, Shalit was returned to Israel as part of the agreement with Hamas. Hamas militants during the exchange wore suicide belts in the event that Israel tried to change the terms at the last minute. The first 447 Palestinian prisoners were also freed and transferred as part of the exchange, the prisoners were also exiled from Israeli territory.

Shortly after his release, on 24 October 2011, President Shimon Peres visited Shalit at his home in Mitzpe Hila to congratulate him and wish him well. At this time, Peres called Shalit a hero, and said that he was proud of his ability "to withstand extremely difficult conditions in captivity." Noam Shalit thanked Peres for his efforts in obtaining Shalit's release. France's President Nicolas Sarkozy sent a congratulatory letter to Gilad Shalit, mentioning France's role in pressuring Hamas to release him.

In March 2013, the Jerusalem Post released information that Shalit conveyed to IDF investigators after his release.

==== Location ====
The location in which Shalit was held is unknown. According to Israeli Home Front Defense Minister Matan Vilnai, even the leaders of Hamas did not know Shalit's exact whereabouts. Only a small group of militants knew where Shalit was being held, and most of them had been killed in IDF operations. According to Vilnai, "there is a very small group of people who are holding Gilad Shalit who know, and a large number of them are no longer with us".

Shortly after the abduction, locating Shalit became a top priority of Israeli intelligence, which soon received false information that he was being held in a fenced private residence on the outskirts of Gaza City. The information had been planted by Hamas to lure the Israelis into raiding the booby-trapped house. Planning for a rescue operation was underway when Israeli intelligence learned of the plot.

In June 2007, Israeli media, citing Hamas sources, reported that Shalit was being held in the basement of a booby-trapped building near Rafah in Gaza, and was being cared for by two guards with whom he had established a cordial relationship. Shalit's living quarters were described as a two-room underground store with enough supplies for two weeks, accessible down a ladder through a 15-meter-deep shaft lined with explosives. The report added that the guards receive supplies and newspaper clippings every two weeks, and that they had been ordered to take good care of Shalit.

In October 2009, Asharq Al-Awsat reported that a senior Israeli defense official had told the newspaper that Israel knew exactly where Shalit was being held and was keeping the location under constant surveillance. The newspaper reported that Hamas was aware that Israel knew Shalit's location, and responded by booby-trapping the area, surrounding it with explosives in a 400–500-meter radius, and issuing a directive to kill Shalit if Israel mounted a military rescue operation.

In June 2011, the Kuwaiti newspaper Al Jarida reported that Shalit had been transferred to a secret and secure location in Egypt ahead of an expected final deal. The newspaper quoted sources as saying that Shalit had been accompanied by Hamas commanders Ahmed Jabari and Mahmoud al-Zahar.

==== Treatment ====
Upon release, doctors stated that Shalit was pale, weak, and malnourished, suggesting that he was held in solitary confinement underground. In an interview, Shalit said that he was "very emotional. I haven't seen people in a long time." and that he was "... not really well." Shalit told his parents that he was initially treated "harshly", and that conditions improved toward the end.

Video later released by Hamas shows Shalit in a large room containing a wall made out of metal bars.

Shalit stated that he had some good things such as television, radio, food, and opportunities to play checkers and dominos with the guards. He stated that they "did not abuse [him] too much". Shalit stated that he kept a regular schedule such as getting up and going to bed at the same time every day, learned some Arabic, and chatted with his captors about sports.

=== International law ===
The International Committee of the Red Cross (ICRC) repeatedly asked Hamas for permission to visit Shalit to ascertain his conditions of detention and treatment. Hamas refused the requests.

An ICRC representative said that under international humanitarian law Shalit is entitled to regular and unconditional contacts with his family. On 25 June 2007, the Israeli human rights organization B'Tselem issued a statement saying "international humanitarian law absolutely prohibits taking and holding a person by force in order to compel the enemy to meet certain demands, while threatening to harm or kill the person if the demands are not met", and thus holding Shalit as a hostage to their demands is a war crime. B'Tselem also noted that denying access to ICRC visitations is also a violation of international law.

Human Rights Watch also stated that Hamas authorities were obligated by the laws of war to allow Shalit to correspond with his family, and noted that three letters and a voice recording cannot be counted as regular correspondence. HRW also called for him to receive visits from the ICRC, and said that the prolonged incommunicado detention of Shalit was cruel and inhumane and amounted to torture.

A UN fact-finding mission headed by Judge Richard Goldstone assigned to investigate the Gaza War, which released its Report in September 2009, called for Shalit to be released.

In June 2010, on the fourth anniversary of Shalit's abduction, Human Rights Watch made a statement describing Hamas' treatment of Shalit as "cruel and inhuman," saying it illustrates the UN definition of torture and violates the international rules of war by prohibiting him from having contact with his family or visits from the Red Cross.

Gerald Steinberg, president of "human rights watchdog NGO Monitor", was quoted in October 2011 as saying that many human rights organizations, "such as the UN Human Rights Council, Human Rights Watch, Amnesty International, Euro-Mediterranean Human Rights Network, Gisha, and the International Red Cross demonstrated very little interest" in the Shalit case.

=== Campaigns for his release ===
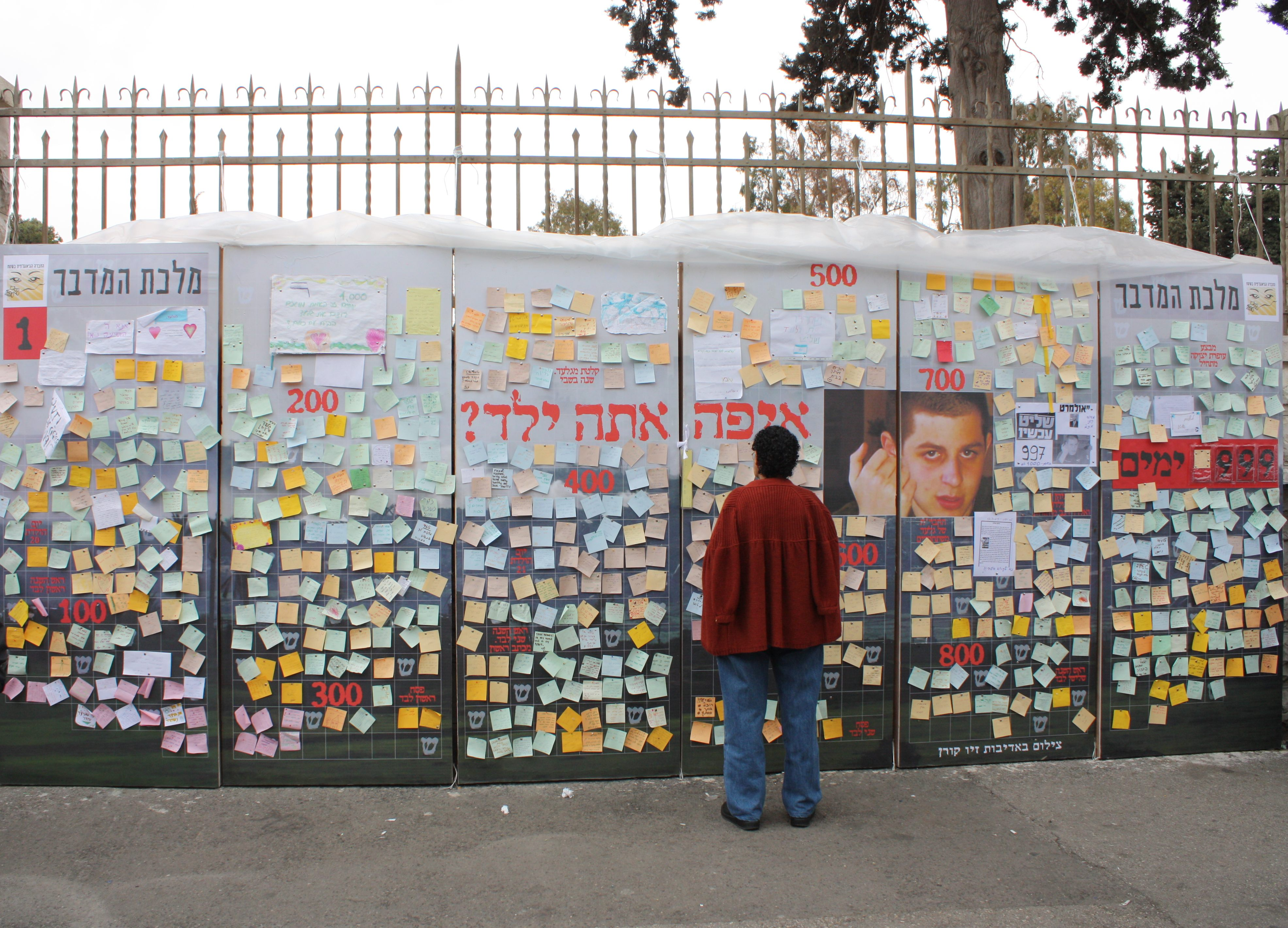
"Where are you, son?" Notes for Shalit, Jerusalem

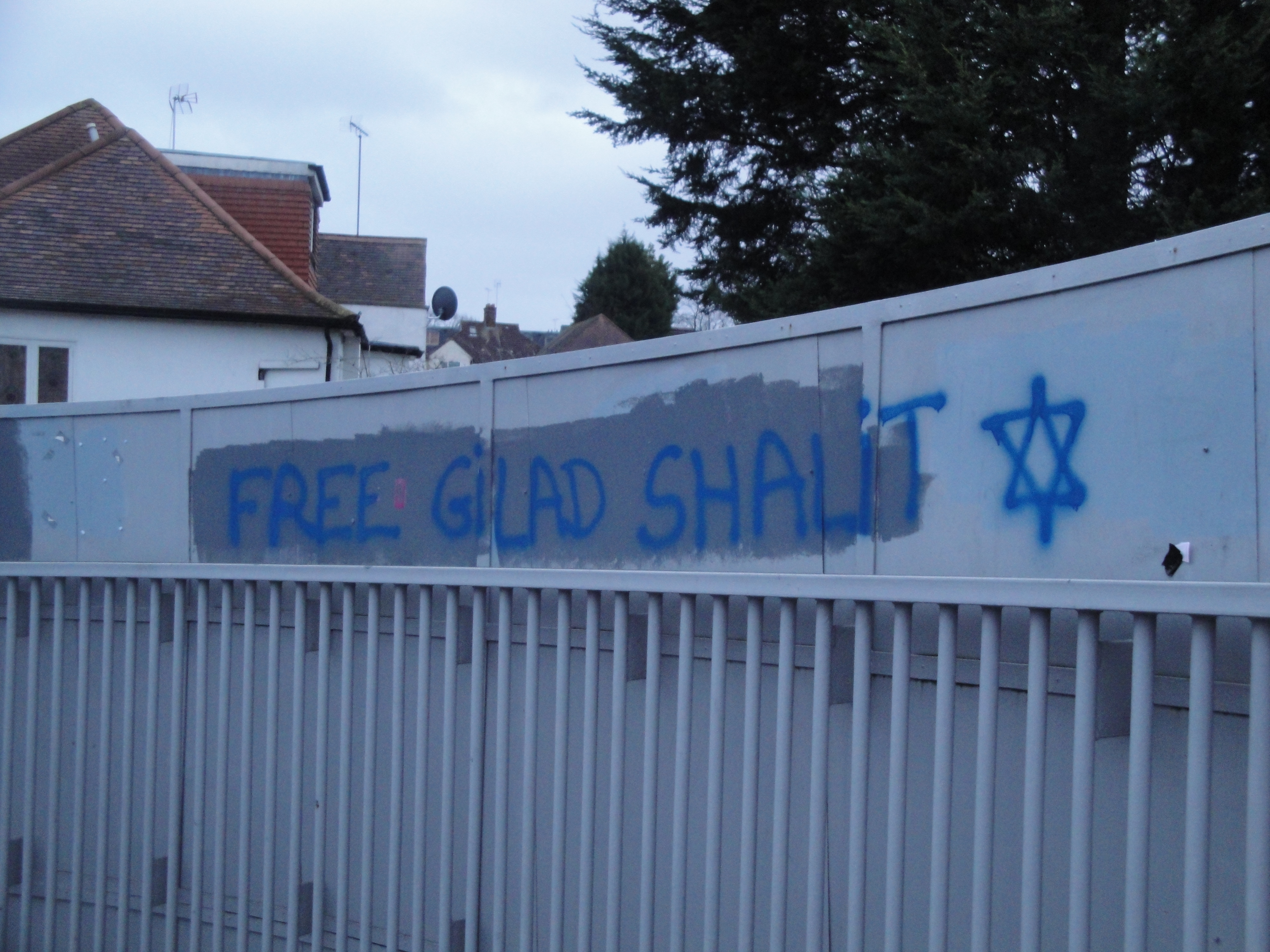
Graffito in support of Shalit in Hendon, London (2011)

==== 5th Anniversary Campaign (2011) ====
In June 2011, the Zionist Federation, among other organizations, stepped up a campaign to ensure that Shalit and his abduction are not forgotten, encouraging members and sympathizers to contact their local MP, MEP and to write letters to newspapers and to Shalit's family with words of support. This followed a two-week Gilad Shalit Awareness Campaign in February, organized by the Embassy of Israel alongside ten other community organizations.

Several prominent Israeli, Palestinian, and international human rights organizations issued a joint statement in June 2011 calling on Hamas to end its "illegal" and "inhumane" treatment of Shalit, including Amnesty International, B'Tselem, Bimkom, Gisha, Human Rights Watch, Palestinian Center for Human Rights, Physicians for Human Rights, Public Committee Against Torture in Israel, Rabbis for Human Rights, The Association for Civil Rights in Israel, Yesh Din; though Noah Pollak, writing in Commentary, noted that the statement did not call for the release of Shalit.

A protest was also held in August 2011 outside Benjamin Netanyahu's office to mark Shalit's sixth birthday in captivity. Gilad Shalit's father Noam also spoke at the social justice protest in Tel Aviv.

==== Gilad Shalit Worldwide Tehillim Project ====
The Gilad Shalit Worldwide Tehillim Project was established to support the reciting of Tehillim (Psalms) for Gilad Shalit. The goal was to have all of Tehillim recited daily.

== Life after release ==
The Israeli Defense Ministry, in anticipation of his release, determined that Shalit would be accorded the status of a disabled veteran with a minimum of 20% disability immediately following his liberation from captivity. At the time of his abduction, Shalit held the rank of corporal, but he was promoted to sergeant during his captivity. Upon his release, Shalit returned to his parents' residence in Mitzpe Hila, an event that garnered substantial attention both within Israel and internationally, resulting in the presence of numerous media outlets and ordinary citizens in Mitzpe Hila. In an act of consideration for Shalit's privacy, many Israeli media organizations committed to limiting extensive coverage of his return.

Following his release from captivity, Shalit initiated medical treatment for his injuries. On 4 November, he underwent a surgical procedure at Rambam Medical Center in Haifa to extract shrapnel fragments lodged in his arm during his abduction. During the approximately two-hour surgery, medical professionals removed seven pieces of shrapnel from his elbow and forearm, two of which were exerting pressure on nerves.

In January 2012, Noam Shalit, Gilad's father, declared his intention to participate as a candidate in the Israeli Labor Party's primaries for the Knesset. On 18 April 2012, Gilad Shalit was honorably discharged from the IDF with the rank of sergeant major.

Following his return home, Shalit held meetings with various dignitaries, including Israeli prime minister Benjamin Netanyahu and French President Nicolas Sarkozy, at the Élysée Palace. He also became a subject of media attention, often being photographed with public figures at sports and other events.

In June 2012, Shalit, known for his enthusiasm for sports and his support for Maccabi Tel Aviv B.C., secured employment as a sports reporter for Yedioth Ahronoth, where he contributed a regular column covering Israeli and European basketball. His inaugural assignment took him to the United States to report on the 2012 NBA Finals in Oklahoma City.

In February 2020, Shalit became engaged to his girlfriend of a year and a half, Nitzan Shabbat. Additionally, in June 2021, Hamas released new videos that depicted Shalit during his captivity, engaging in activities such as exercise, shaving, tying his shoelaces, and playing with a ball in his cell.

In January 2024, Shalit met with several hostages' families, expressed support for them, and talked about his own experience as a hostage.

== Honors bestowed by cities ==
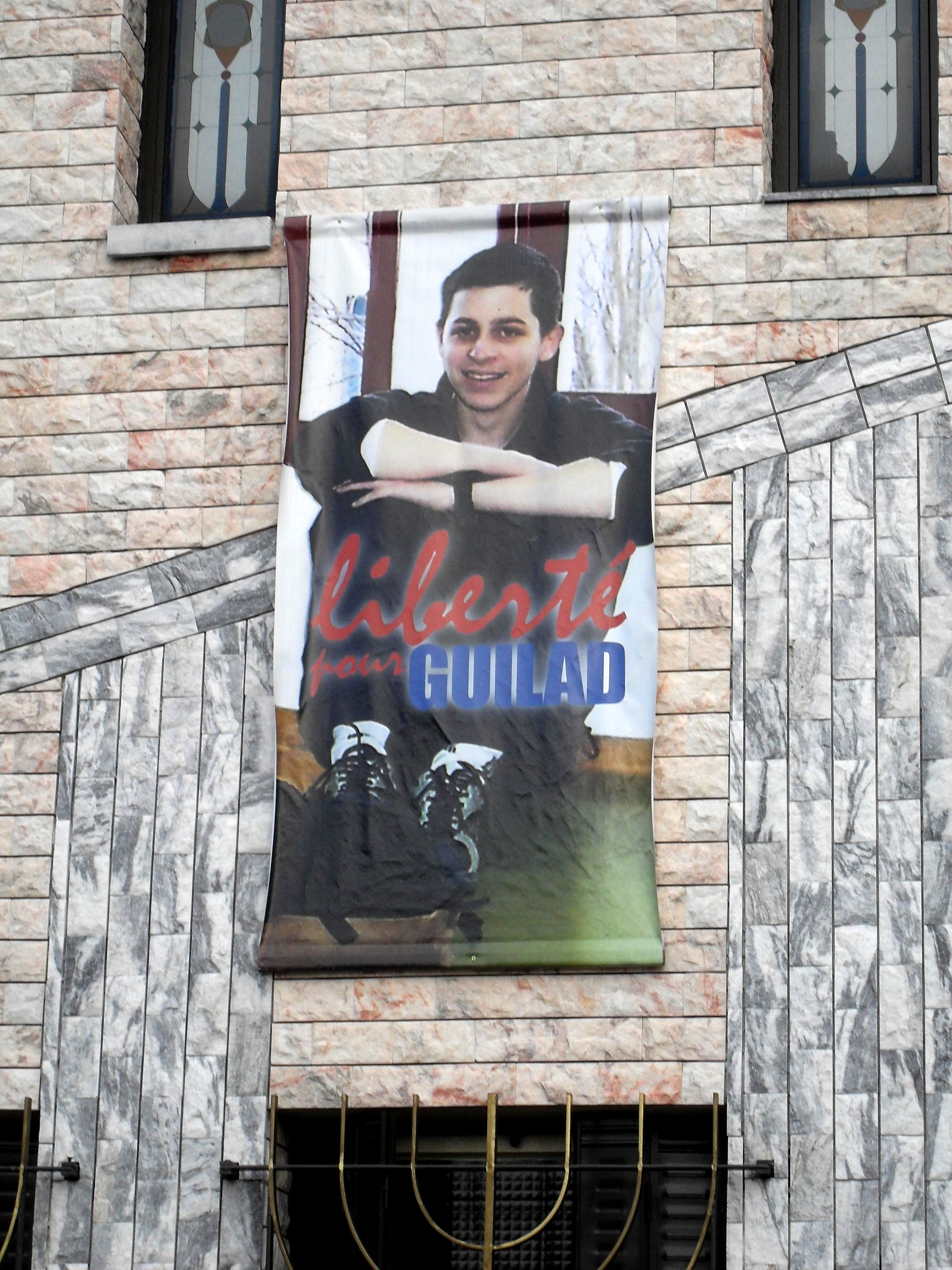
"Freedom for Gilad" poster in France

Shalit has been named an honorary citizen by several cities, including Paris, Raincy, Rome, Miami, New Orleans, Baltimore, and Pittsburgh. Grenoble city hall hung his photo on their building facade the week of 10 December 2008.

== See also ==
- Israeli MIAs
- Pidyon shvuyim
- Death and ransoming of Oron Shaul
- Abduction and killing of Nachshon Wachsman
- Otto Warmbier
- Abduction and killing of Nissim Toledano
- 2014 Gush Etzion kidnapping and murder
- Gaza war hostage crisis
